= Hopkins Island =

Island in South Australia

Coordinates: 34°58′S 136°04′E

Geography
- Location: Spencer Gulf

Administration
- Australia

Hopkins Island is an island located in Spencer Gulf off the east coast of Jussieu Peninsula on Eyre Peninsula in South Australia approximately 32 km (20 mi) south-east of Port Lincoln. It was named by Matthew Flinders in memory of John Hopkins who was one of the eight crew lost from a cutter that capsized on 21 February 1802. Since 2004, the island has been part of the Memory Cove Wilderness Protection Area.

== Description ==
Hopkins Island is located approximately 32 km (20 mi) south-east of Port Lincoln and 1.3 km (0.81 mi) west of Carrington Point, on the west coast of Thistle Island. The island is triangular in plan with its long axis being approximately 1,900 m (6,200 ft) and it maximum width being about 950 m (3,120 ft). Its long axis is aligned in a north-east direction, similar to that of the north-west coast of Thistle Island. The island has an area of 162 ha (400 acres)and has a maximum height of 69 m (226 ft) near its south west end. Access by boat is possible at the small beach on the island’s north coast.

In 1910, it was described as "low-lying and somewhat bare".

Guano deposits were found in caves on the island. It was quarried there in the 19th and early 20th centuries, in some cases under a combined lease including deposits on Lewis Island and Williams Island. In the 1930s, the lease was owned by Dr. Angas Johnson, who purchased it on advice from Arthur Searcy and made it a sanctuary for seals, Cape Barren geese, rock parrots and the Stormy petrel. He had no intention of grazing goats on it, or allowing the activity to occur there. The island had a reputation for being snake infested, but this was not observed by all landing parties.

== Formation, geology and oceanography ==
Hopkins Island was formed about 7000 years ago after sea levels rose at the start of the Holocene. The island has a perimeter consisting of granite over which ‘a flat upper plateau’ of calcarenite sits and which supports ‘a thick soil bed’. The island rises from the seabed at 30 m (98 ft) from within 200 m (660 ft) of its north west coast while the same transition occurs over a distance of almost 600 m (2,000 ft) on its south coast. On its north east coast, the passage between the island and Thistle Island is relatively shallow with a maximum charted depth of 11 m (36 ft) due to both islands sharing the same geological base strata.

== Flora and fauna ==
=== Plants ===
As of 1996, a shrubland dominated by marsh saltbush grows in the deeper soil present on most of the upper platform. Tussock grass and nitre bush is present in locations where thinner soils lying over underlying ridges of rock. Heath bluebush dominates the thinner exposed soils on the island’s perimeter. Weed species were represented by African box thorn, common iceplant, and grasses such as red brome and rat's-tail fescue. It was suggested that these weed species have been successful due to various attempts to develop a pasture on the island suitable for grazing.

=== Terrestrial animals ===
Accounts given of the island's ecology in 1933 refer to its informal name "Snake Island" and describes large populations of snakes and rats. It also noted the presence of little penguins, "thousands" of mutton birds and their eggs. The lessee in the 1930s, Dr. Angas Johnson believed Cape Barren geese also roosted on the island.

The short-tailed shearwater was reported in 1996 as being the dominant animal species on the island with an estimated population of ‘69700 adult birds in 34800 burrows.’ Other species observed at the time include the bush rat and the black tiger snake. As of 2013, the island is reported as being an unconfirmed breeding site for flesh-footed shearwaters.

=== Marine animals ===
Australian sea lions use the beach on the island’s north west coast as a haul out site. In 1938, tuna (then referred to as "tunny") weighing up to 35 lb were caught off Hopkins Island.

== History ==
The island was one of several first sighted by Europeans on Saturday, 20 February 1802, from HMS Investigator whilst under the command of Matthew Flinders entered what is now Spencer Gulf.

Flinders named the island on Wednesday, 24 February 1802, in memory of John Hopkins who lost his life, presumably drowned, along with seven other members of the crew on Sunday 21 February 1802 when one of HMS Investigator's cutters capsized near Cape Catastrophe.

== Economic activity ==
=== Guano ===
Hopkins Island is one of the island sites from which guano was mined under licence from the South Australian Government prior to 1919.

=== Tourism ===
Hopkins Island is notable as a venue to see, swim and snorkel with Australian sea lions.

== Protected areas status ==
Since 30 September 2004, Hopkins Island has been part of the Memory Cove Wilderness Protection Area. Previously, it had been part of the Lincoln National Park. It originally obtained protected area status as a fauna reserve under the former Fauna Conservation Act 1964 in 1965 and status as a fauna conservation reserve declared under the Crown Lands Act 1929–1966 on 16 March 1967.
