= Smith Island (South Australia) =

Island in South Australia

- Location within South Australia

Geography
- Location: Spencer Gulf
- Coordinates: 34°58′59″S 136°01′44″E

Administration
- Australia

Smith Island is an island located in Spencer Gulf off the east coast of Jussieu Peninsula on Eyre Peninsula in South Australia approximately 32 km (20 mi) south-east of Port Lincoln. It was named by Matthew Flinders in memory of William Smith who was one of the eight crew lost from a cutter that capsized sometime after being launched from HM Sloop Investigator to search for water on 21 February 1802. Since 2004, the island has been part of the Memory Cove Wilderness Protection Area.

== Description ==
Smith Island is approximately 32 km (20 mi) south-east of Port Lincoln, 2.8 km (1.7 mi) south of Lewis Island and 1.8 km (1.1 mi) east of Cape Catastrophe. The island has an area of 4 ha (9.9 acres) and a maximum height of 22 m (72 ft) above sea level. Access to the island is limited by the absence of a coastline sheltered from swells and tidal streams.

== Formation, geology and oceanography ==
Smith Island was formed about 9100 years ago when sea levels rose at the start of the Holocene. The island consists of a granite outcrop rising from the seabed to a flat-topped capping of calcarenite which is covered by ‘an unusually thick blanket of soil, thinning only to outcropping calcrete’ at the perimeter of the capping. Below the water's surface, the island rises from a depth of 30 m (98 ft) within only 180 m (590 ft) of its west, south and east shorelines.

== Flora and fauna ==
=== Flora ===
As of 1996, a total of 23 species have been identified. Most of this diversity is confined to the thinner soils at the perimeter of the calcarenite capping. The deeper soil was occupied by marsh saltbush with the deepest soils supporting grey saltbush.

=== Fauna ===
Australian sea lions were plentiful on Smith Island in 1936. Short-tailed shearwaters and white-faced storm petrels nest in burrows excavated within the soil on the island's calcarenite cap. In 1996, the presence of a breeding colony of flesh-footed shearwaters. was discovered on the island. As of 2013, the island is reported as having 150 breeding pairs of flesh-footed shearwaters.

== History ==
The island was one of several first sighted by Europeans on Saturday, 20 February 1802, from HMS Investigator whilst under the command of Matthew Flinders entered what is now Spencer Gulf.

Flinders named the island on Wednesday, 24 February 1802, in memory of William Smith who lost his life, presumably drowned, along with seven other members of the crew on Sunday 21 February 1802 when one of HMS Investigator’s cutters capsized near Cape Catastrophe.

== Economic activity ==
=== Gauno ===
Smith Island is one of the island sites from which guano was mined under licence from the South Australian Government prior to 1919.

== Protected areas status ==
Since 30 September 2004, Smith Island has been part of the Memory Cove Wilderness Protection Area. Previously, it had been part of the Lincoln National Park. It originally obtained protected area status as a fauna reserve under the former Fauna Conservation Act 1964 in 1965 followed by status as a fauna conservation reserve declared under the Crown Lands Act 1929-1966 on 16 March 1967. As of December 2012, the waters surrounding the island are in the Thorny Passage Marine Park.
