= Lincoln National Park (locality) =

- Suburb
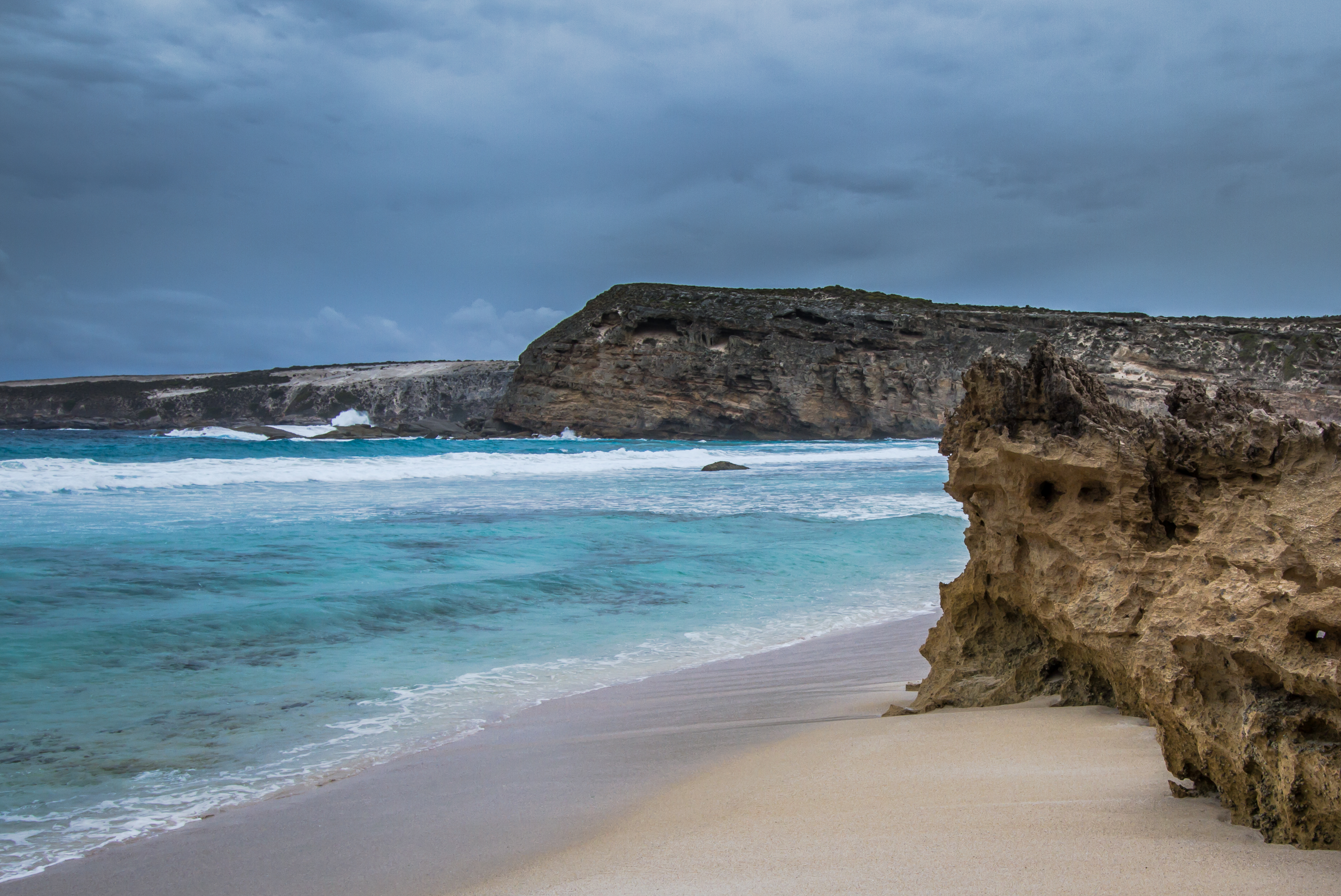
- Curta Rocks, South Australia

- Coordinates: 34°51′34″S 135°53′27″E
- Country: Australia
- State: South Australia
- Region: Eyre Western
- LGA: District Council of Lower Eyre Peninsula
- Location: 250.4 km (155.6 mi) W of Adelaide; 13 km (8.1 mi) S of Port Lincoln
- Established: 2003

Government
  - State electorate: Flinders
  - Federal division: Grey

Area
  - Total: 260 km^{2} (100 sq mi)

Population
  - Total: 0 (SAL 2021)
- Time zone: UTC+9:30 (ACST)
  - Summer (DST): UTC+10:30 (ACST)
- Postcode: 5607
- County: Flinders
- Mean max temp: 21.2 °C (70.2 °F)
- Mean min temp: 11.3 °C (52.3 °F)
- Annual rainfall: 383.2 mm (15.09 in)
Suburbs around Lincoln National Park
	Port Lincoln (body of water)
Sleaford	Lincoln National Park	Spencer Gulf
	Great Australian Bight

Lincoln National Park is a locality located on the Jussieu Peninsula at the southern tip of the Eyre Peninsula in the Australian state of South Australia about 250 kilometres (160 miles) west of the state capital of Adelaide and about 13 kilometres (8.1 miles) south of the city of Port Lincoln.

The boundaries of the locality were created on 30 September 2003 for the “long established name.”

The locality covers the full extent of the Jussieu Peninsula east of the eastern boundary of the cadastral unit, the Hundred of Sleaford. The full extent of the locality does align with the full extent of the Hundred of Flinders, a cadastral unit with an area of 260 square kilometres (101 sq mi), and which was proclaimed by Governor Le Hunte in 1903 and which was named after the British navigator, Matthew Flinders.

The principal land use within the locality is conservation with its full extent being occupied by the following protected areas - the portion of the Lincoln National Park located within the Hundred of Flinders and the Memory Cove Wilderness Protection Area.

The locality includes the two following state heritage places - the site of the memorial (known as the Memory Cove Tablet) installed by Flinders in 1802 at Memory Cove in memory of the loss of eight crew from HMS Investigator and the Flinders Monument at Stamford Hill.

Lincoln National Park is located within the federal Division of Grey, the state electoral district of Flinders and the local government area of the District Council of Lower Eyre Peninsula.

== See also ==
- Cape Catastrophe
