= Lewis Island (South Australia) =

Island in South Australia

- Location within South Australia

Geography
- Location: Spencer Gulf
- Coordinates: 34°57′20″S 136°01′54″E

Administration
- Australia

Lewis Island is an island located in Spencer Gulf off the east coast of Jussieu Peninsula on Eyre Peninsula in South Australia approximately 29 km (18 mi) south-east of Port Lincoln. It was named by Matthew Flinders in memory of George Lewis who was one of the eight crew lost from a cutter that capsized sometime after being launched from HM Sloop Investigator to search for water on 21 February 1802. Since 2004, the island has been part of the Memory Cove Wilderness Protection Area.

== Description ==
Lewis Island is located approximately 29 km (18 mi) south-east of Port Lincoln, 926 m (3,038 ft) south of Little Island and 2.8 km (1.7 mi) north of Smith Island. The island has a maximum height of 44 m (144 ft) above sea level. Access is possible by boat on the island's north east coast during calm weather subject to tidal conditions, particularly in the channel separating it from Little Island.

== Formation, geology and oceanography ==
Lewis Island was formed about 8400 years ago when sea levels rose at the start of the Holocene. The island's structure consists of granite outcrop finished with a capping of calcarenite. Unlike the neighbouring islands, the island's cap finishes in a peak at its southern end rather in lieu of a flat plateau. The island rises from the seabed at 30 m (98 ft) over a distance of within 100 m (330 ft) on its west, south and east faces.

== Flora and fauna ==
=== Terrestrial plants ===
As of 1996, the island was dominated by a shrubland of marsh saltbush on its deeper soil. It also supported at least 19 other species including sea celery, karkalla, grey samphire, Australian hollyhock, native juniper, austral stork's bill and pointed twinleaf. Disturbance of the island's surface by guano mining was suggested as the opportunity for weeds, particularly the African box thorn, to spread onto the island.

=== Terrestrial animals ===
As of 1996, a breeding colony of white-faced storm petrels was present on the higher southern section of the island. Also, the presence of "relatively high number" of silver gulls and Pacific gulls also suggested the possibility of the island being a breeding site for these species. Black-faced shags were also observed roosting at the island's water line. Reptiles are represented by marbled geckos, four-toed earless skinks and bull skink. As of 2013, the island is reported as being a breeding site for flesh-footed shearwaters.

=== Marine animals ===
As of 1996, observations of burrows immediately below the island's calcarenite capping suggests that it may have supported a colony of little penguins. As of 2007, a breeding population of Australian sea lions is reported to be present on the island.

== History ==
The island was one of several first sighted by Europeans on Saturday, 20 February 1802, from HMS Investigator whilst under the command of Matthew Flinders entered what is now Spencer Gulf.

Flinders named the island on Wednesday, 24 February 1802, in memory of George Lewis who lost his life, presumably drowned, along with seven other members of the crew on Sunday 21 February 1802 when one of HMS Investigator’s cutters capsized near Cape Catastrophe.

== Economic activity ==
=== Gauno ===
Lewis Island is one of the island sites from which guano was mined under licence from the South Australian Government prior to 1919. It was mined there in the 1880s, and was sold for £3 10s per ton in 1889 by W. R. Cave & Co of Port Adelaide.

== Protected areas status ==
Since 30 September 2004, Lewis Island has been part of the Memory Cove Wilderness Protection Area. Previously, it had been part of the Lincoln National Park. It originally obtained protected area status as a fauna reserve under the former Fauna Conservation Act 1964 in 1965 and gained status as a fauna conservation reserve declared under the Crown Lands Act 1929-1966 on 16 March 1967. As of December 2012, the waters surrounding the island are in the Thorny Passage Marine Park.
