= Williams Island (South Australia) =

Island in South Australia

- Location within South Australia

Geography
- Location: Great Australian Bight
- Coordinates: 35°01′50″S 135°58′30″E

Administration
- Australia

Williams Island is an island in the Australian state of South Australia located off the south coast of Jussieu Peninsula on Eyre Peninsula approximately 34 km (21 mi) south-east of Port Lincoln. It was named by Matthew Flinders for Robert Williams who subsequently lost his life along with seven other crew in the capsize of a cutter launched from HM Sloop Investigator to search for water on 21 February 1802. Since 2004, the island has been part of the Memory Cove Wilderness Protection Area.

== Description ==
Williams Island which is approximately 34 km (21 mi) south-east of Port Lincoln and 1.8 km (1.1 mi) south-south-east of West Point on the Jussieu Peninsula is broadly a U-shaped island with a maximum height of 40 m (130 ft) and an area of 141 ha (350 acres). While the island is bordered by cliffs, a bay with a sandy beach on its north coast provides both a sheltered anchorage for most wind directions and a point of access to the island.

== Formation, geology and oceanography ==
Williams Island was formed about 9,100 years ago when sea levels began to rise at the start of the Holocene.

The island's geological structure consists of an upper platform of calcarenite laying over on "a U-shaped ridge of pink granite, dark coloured porphyritic granite gneiss with intrusions by large, dark dolerite dykes." The open end of the "U" aligns with the island's northern coast. The U-shaped ridge is visible as an "encircling wall of steep cliffs and talus slopes" over which the "calcarenite platform starts as a talus slope of fractured rock and scree or as low cliffs and overhangs" thickens into "a thick layer of soil" covering most of the island.

The island rises from the sea floor at approximately 50 m (160 ft) over a distance of approximately 0.75 km (0.47 mi) to 1 km (0.62 mi).

== Flora and fauna ==
=== Terrestrial plants ===
As of 1996, a total of 26 plant species was reported as being present. The island's upper platform is dominated by a shrubland of saltbush, dominated by marsh saltbush and grey saltbush while herbfields dominated by austral storksbill are present on low granite outcrops at several locations near the island's south east tip where the underlying granite strata has passed through the island’s calcareous topping. Visitors to the island in 1907 described the island as treeless, but supporting "low, stunted saltbush".

=== Terrestrial animals ===
An account from a 1907 expedition including Sir Douglas Mawson described the island as teeming with snakes, and noted the presence of a large, badly scarred bull seal. As of 1996, a total of one mammal, 11 bird and three reptile species were reported as being present on the island. Of particular note, is the bush rat, the black tiger snake which predates on the bush rat population and short-tailed shearwaters which are reported as using the island as a breeding colony. As of 2013, the island is reported as being an unconfirmed breeding site for flesh-footed shearwaters. In 1907, visitors to the island described it as home to muttonbirds, penguins, large black snakes and plenty of small lizards. Other birds documented during that visit include the little grassbird (Megalorus gramineus) and the Swamp hawk (Circus gouldi).

== History ==
The island was first sighted by Europeans on 20 February 1802 from HMS Investigator whilst under the command of Matthew Flinders and was named on that day after seaman Robert Williams. Williams subsequently lost his life, presumably drowned, along with seven other members of the crew on 21 February 1802 when one of HMS Investigator's cutters capsized near Cape Catastrophe. The island was surveyed by Thomas Lipson, RN in 1840 as part of an ongoing South Australian Government program to map the colony’s waters, identify shipping hazards and assess the suitability of the coastline for settlement.

== Navigation aids ==
A navigation aid consisting of a 6 m (20 ft) tower with a single flashing light was located on the west side of the island since 1963. An area of land of approximately 0.3 ha (0.74 acres) in size is reserved for use by the responsible government agency, the Australian Maritime Safety Authority (AMSA). Access to the Island for the maintenance of the navigation aid is via helicopter.

== Economic activity ==
=== Gauno ===
Williams Island is one of the island sites from which guano was mined under licence from the South Australian Government prior to 1919.

== Protected area status ==
Since 30 September 2004, Williams Island has been part of the Memory Cove Wilderness Protection Area. Previously, it had been part of the Lincoln National Park. As of December 2012, the waters surrounding the island are in the Thorny Passage Marine Park.
