= Little Island (South Australia) =

Uninhabited island off South Australia coast

- Location within South Australia

Geography
- Location: Spencer Gulf
- Coordinates: 34°56′57″S 136°01′30″E

Administration
- Australia

Little Island is an island in the Australian state of South Australia located in Spencer Gulf off the east coast of Jussieu Peninsula on Eyre Peninsula approximately 28 kilometres (17 mi) south-east of Port Lincoln. It was named by Matthew Flinders in memory of John Little who was one of the eight crew lost from a cutter that capsized sometime after being launched from HM Sloop Investigator to search for water on 21 February 1802. Since 2004, the island has been part of the Memory Cove Wilderness Protection Area.

== Description ==
Little Island which is located approximately 28 kilometres (17 mi) south-east of Port Lincoln and is located 926 m (3,038 ft) north of Lewis Island, has a maximum height of 8 m (26 ft). Access to the island is limited by the absence of a coastline sheltered from swells and tidal streams, and the unsuitability of the island's terrain for the landing of helicopters.

== Formation, geology and oceanography ==
Little Island was formed about 8400 years ago when sea levels rose at the start of the Holocene. The island is predominantly granite which is eroded to the extent that the island is divided into two sections. Each section has a calcarenite capping that reaches a height of 8 m (26 ft) above sea level. The island rises from the seabed at 30 m (98 ft) almost vertically on its south east face while the same transition occurs over a distance of almost 200 m (660 ft) on its north west face.

== Flora and fauna ==
As of 1996, the flora is reported as being a shrubland composed of marsh saltbush while the fauna is reported as consisting of the following vertebrate animals: sooty oystercatchers and Pacific gulls and ‘a large colony’ of Australian sea lions.

== History ==
The island was one of several first sighted by Europeans on Saturday, 20 February 1802, from HMS Investigator whilst under the command of Matthew Flinders entered what is now Spencer Gulf.

Flinders named the island on Wednesday, 24 February 1802, in memory of John Little who lost his life, presumably drowned, along with seven other members of the crew on Sunday 21 February 1802 when one of HMS Investigator’s cutters capsized near Cape Catastrophe.

== Protected areas status ==
Since 30 September 2004, Little Island has been part of the Memory Cove Wilderness Protection Area. Previously, it had been part of the Lincoln National Park. It first obtained protected area status as a fauna conservation reserve declared under the Crown Lands Act 1929-1966 on 16 March 1967. As of December 2012, the waters surrounding the island are in the Thorny Passage Marine Park.
