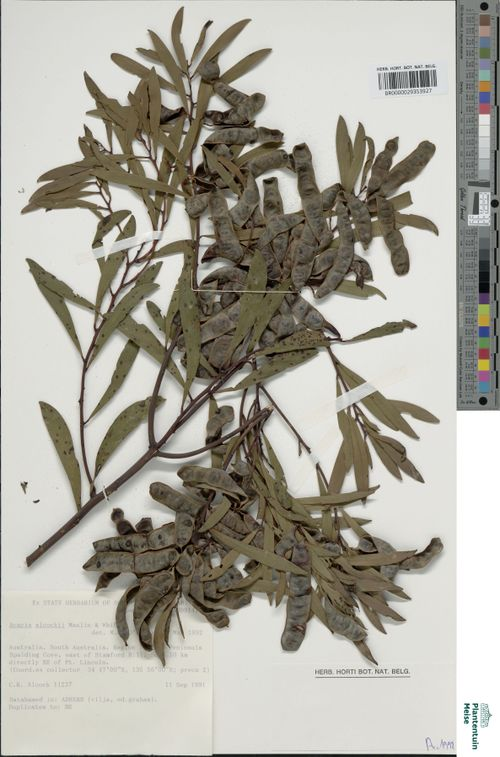
- Herbarium specimen collected near Port Lincoln

Scientific classification
- Kingdom: Plantae
- Clade: Tracheophytes
- Clade: Angiosperms
- Clade: Eudicots
- Clade: Rosids
- Order: Fabales
- Family: Fabaceae
- Subfamily: Caesalpinioideae
- Clade: Mimosoid clade
- Genus: Acacia
- Species: A. alcockii

Binomial name
- Acacia alcockii Maslin & Whibley
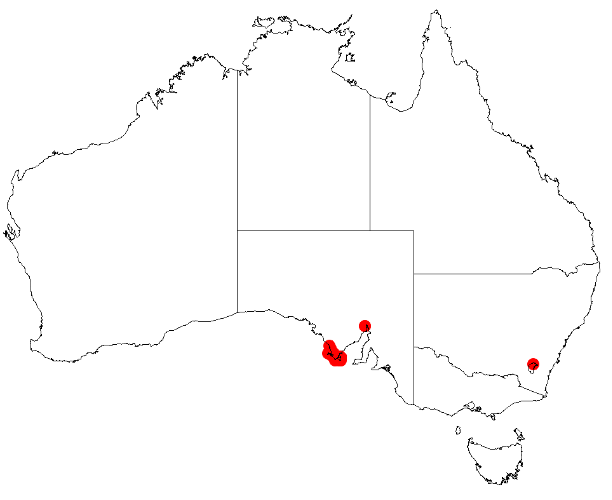

Synonyms
- Racosperma alcockii (Maslin & Whibley) Pedley

= Acacia alcockii =

Alcock's wattle

Species of plant

Acacia alcockii, also known as Alcock's wattle, is a species of flowering plant in the family Fabaceae and is endemic to South Australia. It is a bushy shrub with narrowly elliptic to lance-shaped phyllodes with the narrower end towards the base, and racemes of 5 to 11 spherical heads of pale yellow flowers, and oblong pods.

== Description ==
Acacia alcockii is a bushy shrub that typically grows to a height of up to about 3 m (9.8 ft) and often forms suckers. Its branchlets are glabrous and dark reddish. Its phyllodes narrowly elliptic to lance-shaped with the narrower end towards the base, mostly 60–90 mm (2.4–3.5 in) long and 8–21 mm (0.31–0.83 in) wide, with a gland usually 8–12 mm (0.31–0.47 in) above the pulvinus, the pulvinus itself 2–6 mm (0.079–0.236 in) long.

The flowers are borne in spherical heads of 5 to 11 on a raceme mostly 2–4 mm (0.079–0.157 in) long on a peduncle mostly 4–5 mm (0.16–0.20 in) long, each head with 25 to 40 pale yellow flowers. Flowering time varies between populations, and the fruit is an oblong to narrowly oblong, leathery to crusty pod up to 90 mm (3.5 in) long and 8–17 mm (0.31–0.67 in) wide, containing dull black oblong seeds 5–6 mm (0.20–0.24 in) long.

== Taxonomy ==
Acacia alcockii was first formally described in 1987 in the journal Nuytsia from specimens collected in Lincoln National Park in 1983. The specific epithet honours Charles Raymond Alcock, who was a plant collector well known for the specimens he collected on the Eyre Peninsula including the first collection of A. alcockii.

== Distribution and habitat ==
Alcock's wattle is native to southern parts of the Eyre Peninsula on the south west coast between Mount Dutton and Mount Drummond. On the south east coast the shrub is found between Billy Light Point close to Port Lincoln to the Lincoln National Park where it grows in sandy soils over limestone and sometimes in skeletal soils above granite.

== See also ==
- List of Acacia species
