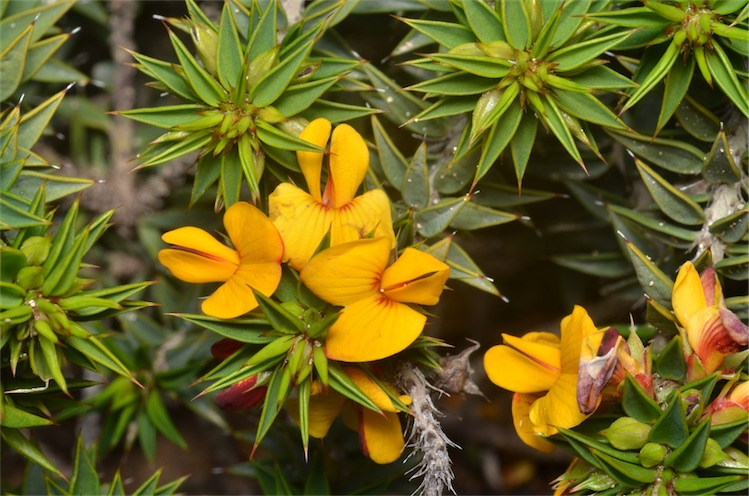

Scientific classification
- Kingdom: Plantae
- Clade: Tracheophytes
- Clade: Angiosperms
- Clade: Eudicots
- Clade: Rosids
- Order: Fabales
- Family: Fabaceae
- Subfamily: Faboideae
- Genus: Pultenaea
- Species: P. rigida

Binomial name
- Pultenaea rigida Benth.

Synonyms
- Pultenaea rigida var. ovata J.Z.Weber; Pultenaea rigida Benth. var. rigida

= Pultenaea rigida =

Species of legume

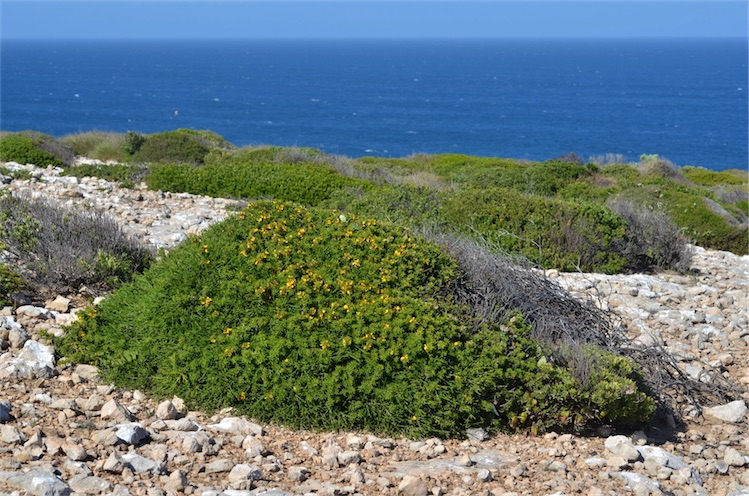
Habit at Anxious Bay

Pultenaea rigida is a species of flowering plant in the family Fabaceae and is endemic to south-eastern South Australia. It is a rigid, erect to prostrate, much-branched shrub with lance-shaped, sharply-pointed leaves and yellow and red to purplish flowers.

== Description ==
Pultenaea rigida is a rigid, erect to prostrate, sometimes mat-forming shrub that typically grows to a height of 0.2–2.0 m (7.9 in – 6 ft 6.7 in) and has softly-hairy stems when young. The leaves are rigid, lance-shaped to egg-shaped, 6–15 mm (0.24–0.59 in) long and sessile with lance-shaped stipules 2–4 mm (0.079–0.157 in) long at the base and a sharply-pointed tip. The flowers are arranged singly or in small leafy clusters on the ends of branches and are 8–10 mm (0.31–0.39 in) long on peduncles up to 3–7 mm (0.12–0.28 in) long. The sepals are 5–7 mm (0.20–0.28 in) long, joined at the base with lance-shaped, sharply-pointed bracteoles 3–4 mm (0.12–0.16 in) long at the base of the sepal tube. The standard petal is yellow and red and 6–11.5 mm (0.24–0.45 in) wide, the wings are yellow to orange and 6–1 mm (0.236–0.039 in) long and the keel is reddish-purple to yellowish-green and 6.5–9.5 mm (0.26–0.37 in) long. Flowering mainly occurs from September to November and the fruit is an oval or oblong pod 3.4–6.5 mm (0.13–0.26 in) long.

== Taxonomy ==
Pultenaea rigida was first formally described in 1864 by George Bentham in Flora Australiensis from specimens collected by Robert Brown at Memory Cove.

== Distribution and habitat ==
This species of Pultenaea grows in forest, mallee, heathland or on dunes and headlands and is common on the Mount Lofty Ranges, Yorke and Eyre Peninsulas and on Kangaroo Island.
