= Owen Island (South Australia) =

Island in South Australia

- Location within South Australia

Geography
- Location: Spencer Gulf
- Coordinates: 34°51′30″S 136°00′31″E
- Area: 20.1 ha (50 acres)
- Highest elevation: 12 m (39 ft)

Administration
- Australia

Owen Island, formerly known as Rabbit Island and also known as Little Taylor Island, is an island in the Australian state of South Australia located in Spencer Gulf off the east coast of Jussieu Peninsula on Eyre Peninsula approximately. 18.7 kilometres (11.6 mi) south-east of Port Lincoln. Since 1972, the island has been part of the Lincoln National Park.

== Description ==
Owen Island which is located approximately 18.7 kilometres (11.6 mi) south-east of Port Lincoln and is located 460 m (1,510 ft) north of Taylor Island, has a maximum height of 12 m (39 ft). Sandy beaches exist on the island’s west side with a submerged sand spit near the island’s south-western point. Sand dominates the island with wind-blown dunes extending beyond the limits of tide and storm surges which was reported in 1996 as ‘providing a bed for a high diversity of plants. It is reported that the island is sheltered from the impact of the sea due to the closeness of the much larger Taylor Island plus the additional shelter offered by the mainland and other islands to the south. As of 1996, it is reported as being accessible by boat.

== Formation, geology and oceanography ==
Owen Island was formed about 6000 years ago when sea levels rose at the start of the Holocene. The island is a granite outcrop capped with a residual layer of calcarenite. The island rises from the seabed at 10 m (33 ft) within 100 m (330 ft) to 300 m (980 ft) on its east side while on its west and south side while the same transition occurs over a distance of approximately 850 m (2,790 ft). The passage between the island’s south coast and Taylor Island is relatively shallow with a maximum charted depth of 5.2 m (17 ft) due to both islands sharing the same geological base strata.

== Flora and fauna ==
As of 1996, the flora is reported as consisting of two distinct areas. The coastal sand supports plants such as grey saltbush, sea spurge and two-horned sea rocket. The rest of the island supports a shrubland dominated by nitre bush and saltbush. Other species observed in the shrubland included Australian hollyhock, black-anther flax lily, bower spinach, coastal lignum, karkalla, native juniper and variable groundsel. As of 1996, the fauna was reported as consisting of the following vertebrates: five species of birds including Pacific gulls, rock parrots and a breeding colony of white-faced storm petrels, and one species of reptile, the southern grass skink.

== Naming ==
The island was formerly known as Rabbit Island, however it was renamed under "the Crown Lands Act" around about 1960 in order to reportedly avoid confusion with the Rabbit Island located in Louth Bay. The new name acknowledged the Owen family who was leasing Taylor Island at the time of the name change. The island is known "locally known as Little Taylor Island due to its close proximity to Taylor Island."

== Protected areas status ==
Owen Island first obtained protected area status as a fauna conservation reserve declared under the Crown Lands Act 1929-1966 on 16 March 1967. Since 1972, it has been part of the Lincoln National Park.
