= Bicker Isles =

Isles in Australia

- Location within South Australia

Geography
- Location: Spencer Gulf
- Coordinates: 34°44′40″S 135°57′16″E

Administration
- Australia

The Bicker Isles are two small islands in Proper Bay, Spencer Gulf, South Australia. They lie between Surfleet Point on the mainland, and Hayden Point on Boston Island. They are uninhabited, and fall within the boundary of Lincoln National Park. They were named by Matthew Flinders on 25 February 1802 after Bicker, a town in Lincolnshire, England. The islands are round and somewhat featureless. The northern island is approximately 8 ha in size, and the southern island, which lies midway between the northern island and Surfleet Point is approximately 5 ha. The waters surrounding Bicker Isles are zoned for aquaculture and are known as the Bicker Island Harvesting Area. The isles are part of the Lincoln National Park.

The isles' name has appeared variously as Bickers Islands, Bicker Islands, Bickers Isles, Bicker Island, Bickers Island and Becker's Island. In 1888 at least one of the islands was overrun with rabbits.
