= Lincoln National Park =

National park in South Australia

- IUCN category II (national park)
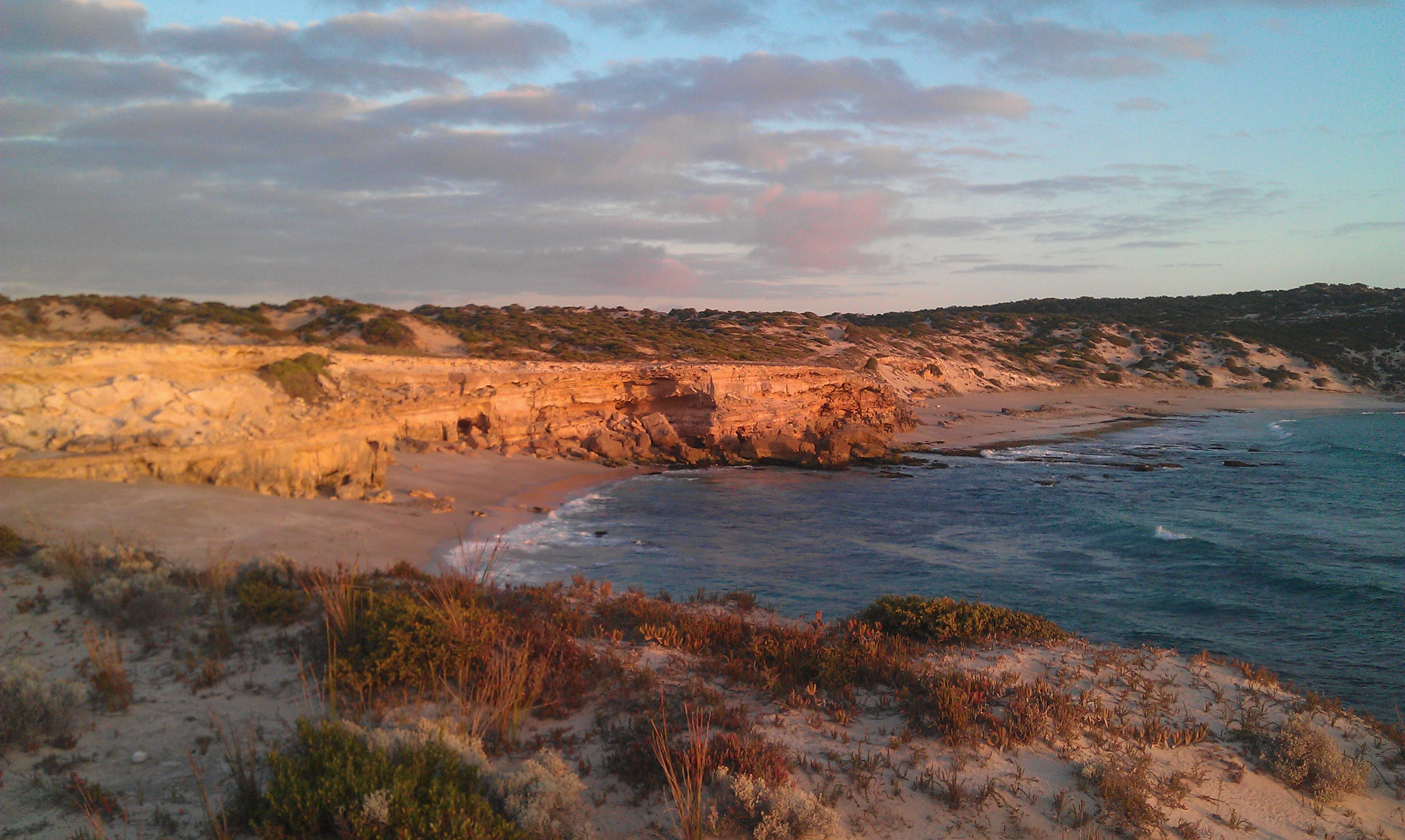
- Limestone cliffs at Wanna

- Location within South Australia
- Location: South Australia
- Nearest city: Port Lincoln
- Coordinates: 34°51′57″S 135°52′18″E
- Area: 216.38 km^{2} (83.54 sq mi)
- Established: 28 August 1941
- Governing body: Department for Environment and Water
- Website: www.parks.sa.gov.au/parks/lincoln-national-park

Lincoln National Park is a protected area in the Australian state of South Australia located about 249 kilometres (155 mi) west of the state capital of Adelaide and about 9.5 kilometres (5.9 mi) south of the municipal seat of Port Lincoln. It consists of a mainland area on the Jussieu Peninsula on the south eastern tip of Eyre Peninsula and a number of nearby islands. The national park contains significant sites of natural, indigenous and early European heritage.

== Description ==
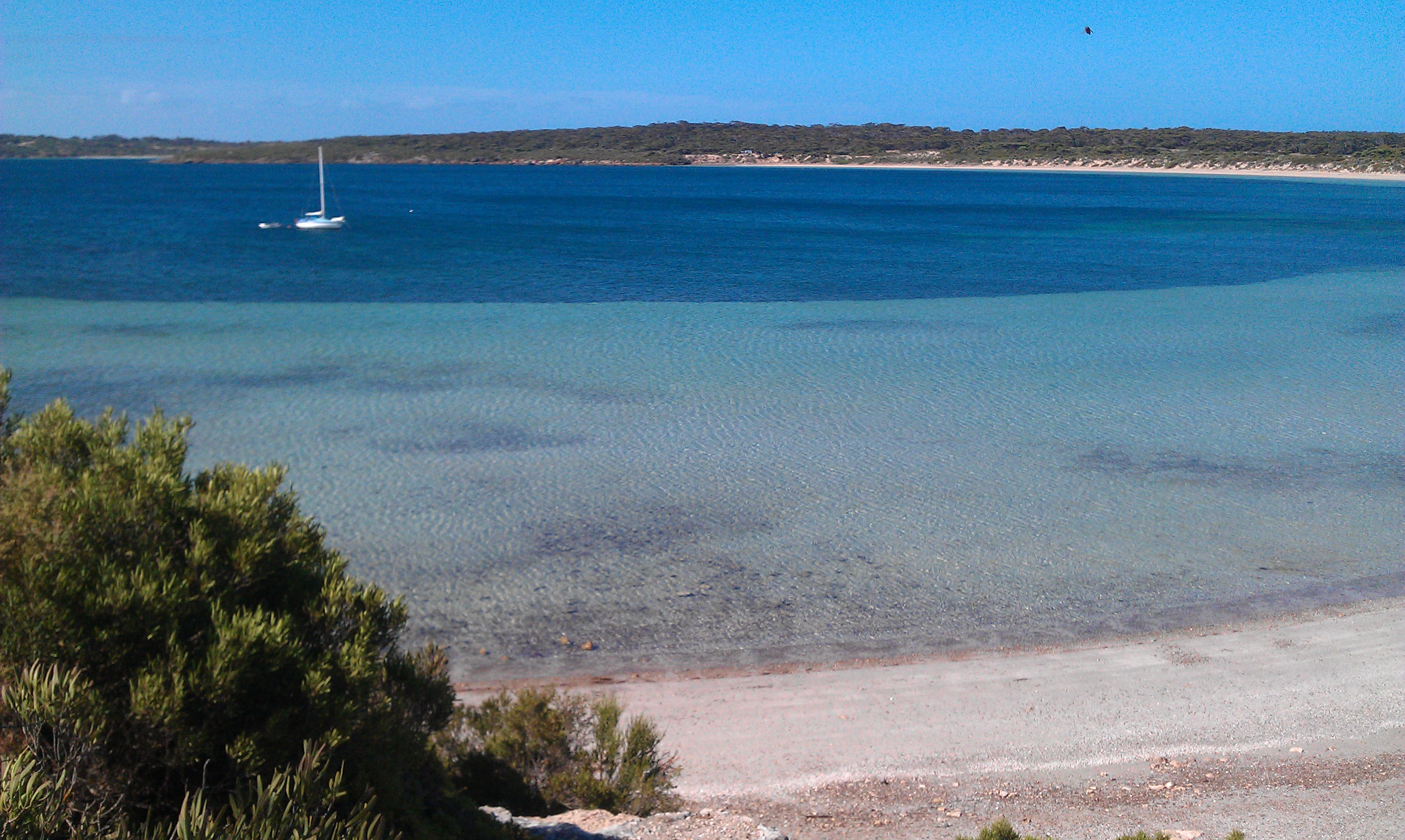
Spalding Cove

Sand dunes

Lincoln National Park is located on the Jussieu Peninsula on the south-eastern tip of Eyre Peninsula in South Australia as well as an adjoining portion of Eyre Peninsula and a number of islands adjoining the coastline. The part of the national park located on Jussieu Peninsula is located within the gazetted localities of Lincoln National Park and Sleaford.

=== Jussieu Peninsula ===
Lincoln National Park occupies the majority of Jussieu Peninsula. The remainder of the Jussieu Peninsula is occupied by the Memory Cove Wilderness Protection Area. The western gateway to the national park is via the isthmus that connects the Jussieu Peninsula to the mainland. The Sleaford Mere Conservation Park abuts the western border of the national park. Land-based park entry is made by road at both the northern and southern sides of the isthmus. The south road is 4WD access only.

The northern coastline of the peninsula curls northward to Cape Donington, where the Cape Donington Lighthouse is situated. Cape Donington is the southern point at the mouth of Port Lincoln, the large, sheltered deep water harbour on which the city of Port Lincoln is located. The eastern coast of the national park which faces onto Spencer Gulf extends from Cape Donington to Taylor's Landing (opposite Taylor Island).

The southern boundary of the national park curls southward from Mary Ellis Wreck Beach in the west to the east side of Jussieu Bay in the east. The coastline varies from extensive sand dunes behind Sleaford Bay to limestone cliffs on the east side of Jussieu Bay. The seas in this exposed area are very rough, with dangerous rips leading to numerous drownings.

=== Islands ===
Lincoln National Park includes the following islands, which are located in the waters adjoining the Jussieu Peninsula:

- Bicker Isles and Horse Rock in the body of water known as Port Lincoln
- Rabbit Island (in Louth Bay), Donington Island, Carcase Rock, an unnamed island in Shag Cove, Owen Island, and an unnamed islet south of Taylor Island in Spencer Gulf
- Curta Rocks, Liguanea Island and Albatross Island (immediately south of Thistle Island) in the Great Australian Bight

=== Protected area designation ===
The national park is classified as an IUCN category II protected area.

== History ==
On 28 August 1941, land in sections 2, 5, 6, and 13 in the cadastral unit of the Hundred of Flinders was dedicated under the Crown Lands Act 1929 as a Flora and Fauna Reserve. On 9 November 1967, land in sections 2, 3, 5, 6, 12, 13 and 14 in the Hundred of Flinders was proclaimed as the Lincoln National Park under the National Parks Act 1966.

On 27 April 1972, the national park was reconstituted under the National Parks and Wildlife Act 1972 in respect to the following land - "Hundred Flinders, Section 2, 3, 5, 6, 12-14, Smith Island, Hopkins Island, Lewis Island, Little Island, Owen Island, Albatross Island, Liguanea Island, Rabbit Island (being section 395, North out of Hundreds), Curta Rocks (and) Hundred Flinders, Section 4".

In the years 1972–1992, the national park increased in size by the addition of land at Stamford Hill (whose original Barngarla name was Gaidyaba), Cape Donington, Wanna and many of the islands adjoining the coast of the Jussieu Peninsula. The Lincoln Conservation Reserve which was proclaimed in 1993 under the Crown Lands Act 1929, was added to the national park's management regime and subsequently removed after the declaration of the reserve as the Lincoln Conservation Park. In June 1999, the boundary of the national park was extended down to mean low water mark.

In 2004, a parcel of land consisting of land around Memory Cove and Hopkins, Lewis, Little, Smith and Williams Islands was excised from the national park and established as a separate protected area under the Wilderness Protection Act 1992 (SA) and with the name, the Memory Cove Wilderness Protection Area.

== Prior use of the land ==
=== Indigenous use ===
The Aboriginal tribes of Barngarla and Nauo were the first people to have lived in the region. Archaeological digs have found sites of stone working, including fish traps, and middens throughout the national park.

=== European discovery ===
The coastline of Jussieu Peninsula and the adjoining islands was first visited by European explorers in 1802 when the British navigator, Matthew Flinders visited in 1802 followed by the Baudin expedition to Australia later in that year. A stone obelisk monument known as the Flinders Monument was dedicated at Stamford Hill in 1844 by Sir John Franklin in tribute to Flinders' achievements and is listed as a state heritage place on the South Australian Heritage Register.

=== Early European settlement ===
Subsequent to the survey by Flinders, the land was settled by a small number of Europeans, mainly along Cape Donington (named after the birthplace of Flinders), where the first grain crop was sown in 1875. Other industries that occurred in the early parts of European settlement were woodcutting, grazing and guano mining. Donington cottage, which still stands and is accessible to the public, is a relic of that era. The Cape Donington Lighthouse was built in 1905. A hexagonal concrete tower, it stands 32 m high and is still in operation. On 5 April 1907 the ketch Mary Ellis, on its way from Port Adelaide to Venus Bay, got caught in a gale and was wrecked on a beach along Sleaford Bay, now named Mary Ellis Wreck Beach. Despite total destruction of the ship, no casualties were recorded.

== Flora and fauna ==
A kangaroo near Wanna

=== Flora ===
The national park is largely covered by coastal mallee eucalypts around outcrops of granite. The sand dunes on the southern coastline have smaller shrub coverage.

=== Fauna ===
The national park is home to a number of resident as well as migratory bird and animal species. Numerous kangaroos, wallabies and emus reside in the national park. Feral foxes were once common in the national park, endangering the existence of many native animals, however after an extensive baiting and culling program, their numbers have diminished. With the reduction in fox numbers, a rebound in goanna and bush stone curlew populations have been recorded. Brush-tailed bettongs and malleefowl have been reintroduced in the national park and are now becoming common.

Migratory birds such as red-necked stints and sandpipers spend summer in the national park as part of their seasonal migrations from places as distant as the Arctic Circle and Siberia. Southern right whales are visible in the water surrounding the national park during their seasonal migrations between July and November and Australian sea lions can be seen on rocks and small islands off the coast.

== Visitor attractions and services ==
Four-wheel driving and fishing

The national park hosts a range of activities including bushwalking, four-wheel driving, camping, snorkelling, scuba diving, swimming and fishing.

=== Walking trails ===
As of 2010, a total of 19 bushwalking trails with a length of over 100 kilometres (62 mi) were available within the national park. The trail system is also part of a regional walking trail known as the Investigator Trail. which extends outside of both the national park and the Jussieu Peninsula to North Shields via Tulka and Port Lincoln.

=== Four-wheel drive tracks ===
Much of the national park is only accessible via four-wheel drive tracks including the Sleaford to Wanna sand dune track.

=== Accommodation ===
Accommodation consists of one building at Spalding Cove, four formal camping grounds at Fisherman's Point, September Beach, Surfleet Cove and Taylor's Landing, and eight unserviced camping grounds.

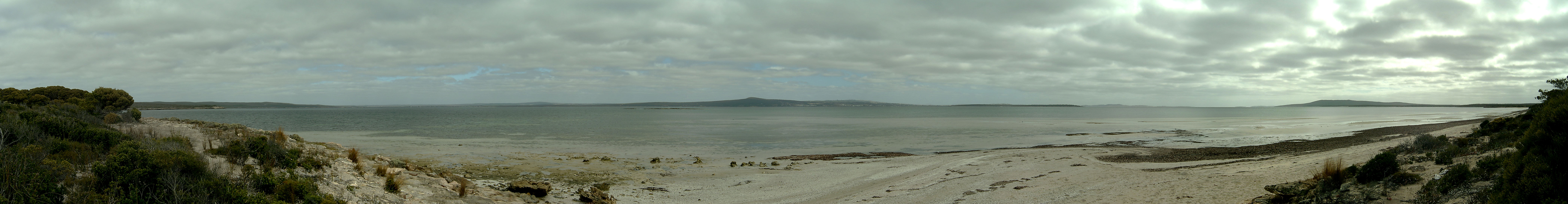

== See also ==
- Protected areas of South Australia
- Coffin Bay National Park

== Citations and references ==
=== References ===
- "Lincoln National Park and Memory Cove Wilderness Protection Area (brochure)" (PDF). National Parks South Australia (NPSA). 2015.
- "Lincoln National Park and Memory Cove Wilderness Protection Area Map" (PDF). Natural Resources Eyre Peninsula (NREP). 2014.
- "Buskwalking in Lincoln National Park Map" (PDF). National Parks South Australia (NPSA). 2014.
- "Memory Cove Wilderness Protection Area (brochure)" (PDF). Department of Environment and Heritage (DENR). 2010. Archived from the original (PDF) on 21 December 2015.
- "Conservation Parks of Lower Eyre Peninsula Management Plan" (PDF). Department for Environment and Heritage (DEH). 2007.
