= Cape Donington =

Cape Donington South Australia
- Coordinates: 34°44′S 136°0′E
- Location: 10 km (6 mi) east of Port Lincoln

Cape Donington is a headland in the Australian state of South Australia located at the most northerly part of the Jussieu Peninsula on the east coast of Eyre Peninsula in about 10 kilometres (6.2 miles) east of the city of Port Lincoln.

It is the southern entrance point for the natural harbour known as Port Lincoln. The cape is described by one source as being "the N[orth] extremity of a peninsula which extends 4 nautical miles (7.4 kilometres; 4.6 miles) N[orth] from the coast", that "this extension forms the E[ast] side of Spalding Cove" and that "about 0.5 nautical miles (0.93 kilometres; 0.58 miles) S[outh] W[est] of the cape, the land rises to a wooded summit, 53 metres (174 feet) high."

It was named by the Royal Navy officer, Matthew Flinders, on 25 February 1802 reportedly after "his native village in Lincolnshire". The land around Cape Donington was first used for agricultural purposes in 1875. A navigation aid consisting of a light was installed in 1905 and was subsequently replaced by a lighthouse.

After 1972, the land was added to the Lincoln National Park with a parcel of land sized at 4 hectares (9.9 acres) being leased to the Australian Maritime Safety Authority for the purpose of operating the lighthouse.

== See also ==
- Donington, Lincolnshire
