= Memory Cove Wilderness Protection Area =

Protected area in South Australia

- IUCN category Ib (wilderness area)
- Location within South Australia
- Location: South Australia
- Nearest city: Port Lincoln
- Coordinates: 34°55′51.5244″S 135°57′53.3124″E
- Area: 93.36 km^{2} (36.05 sq mi)
- Established: 30 September 2004
- Governing body: Department for Environment and Water
- Website: Official website

Memory Cove Wilderness Protection Area is a protected area in the Australian state of South Australia located on the south east tip of Jussieu Peninsula on Eyre Peninsula and on a number of nearby islands about 25 km (16 mi) south-south east of Port Lincoln. It was established in 2004 on land previously part of the Lincoln National Park. The protection area contains significant sites of natural, indigenous and early European heritage.

== Extent ==
The wilderness protection area occupies the south east tip of Jussieu Peninsula on Eyre Peninsula and the following islands - Hopkins, Little, Lewis and Smith in Spencer Gulf and Williams in the Great Australian Bight down to Mean Low Water Mark. Its extent on Jussieu Peninsula is bounded by the peninsula's coastline as follows: its eastern boundary extends from near Taylor's Landing (a small cove located opposite to Taylor Island) in a southerly direction to Cape Catastrophe, its southern boundary extends from Cape Catastrophe in a westerly direction to West Point and its western boundary consists of the coastline of the east side of Jussieu Bay from West Point in a northerly direction to a point on the coastline approximately west of Memory Cove. The west and north sides of the wilderness protection area adjoin the Lincoln National Park.

== Origins and history ==
Previously the land was part of the Lincoln National Park and its predecessors since 1941. During the 1980s, the land around Memory Cove was 'identified as having some of the highest quality wilderness values in the state'. In 1992, a locked gate was installed on the road to Memory Cove in order to restrict access in order to minimise disturbance. In 1999, it was proposed to proclaim the area and the following islands - Hopkins, Lewis, Little, Smith and Williams, as a wilderness protection area under the Wilderness Protection Act 1992. On the basis of significant support for the proposal, the area was excised from the park and formally proclaimed as the Memory Cove Wilderness Protection Area on 30 September 2004. Prior to being part of a protected area, the land supported the Aboriginal tribes of Barngarla and Nauo as well as a small amount of agricultural activity by European settlers.

The Memory Cove Tablet Site, which marks one of the few places that Matthew Flinders came ashore in South Australia, lies within the area and is listed on the South Australian Heritage Register.

== Wilderness qualities ==
The following qualities have been identified by the government agency managing the wilderness protection area. Firstly, 180 species of native flora have been recorded within the wilderness protection area including seven species considered to be of conservation significance. Secondly, the area is considered to have significant cultural history in respect to the Barngarla and the Nauo people, who occupied the area prior to European arrival. Thirdly, the event concerning the loss of eight crew from HM Sloop Investigator under the command of Matthew Flinders during February 1802 in the waters adjoining the wilderness protection area is considered to be of historical significance.

== Visitor services ==
Access is regulated by a locked gate within the adjoining Lincoln National Park. A maximum of 15 vehicles per day is permitted to enter. A camping ground exists at Memory Cove. Yachts and boats can anchor in the sheltered waters available at Memory Cove and Williams Island. Recreational fishing and associated water-based activities take place in the waters adjoining the wilderness protection area.
