= Boston Island =

Island in South Australia

Boston Island (Kuriljeli)
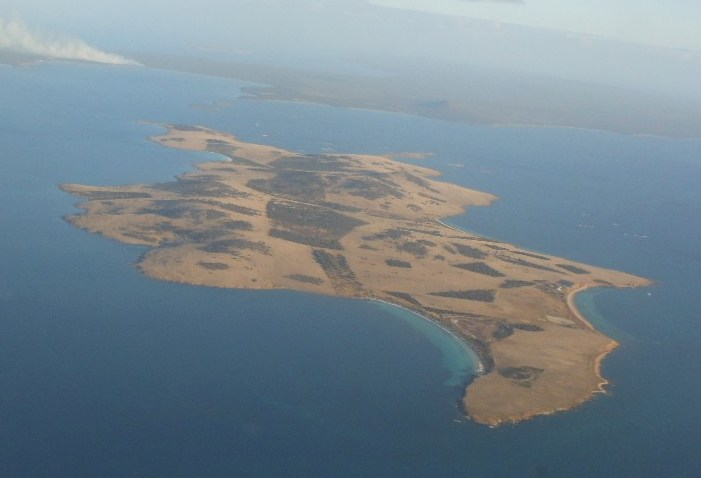

- Location within South Australia

Geography
- Location: Spencer Gulf
- Coordinates: 34°42′S 135°56′E

Administration
- Australia

Boston Island (Barngarla: Goorilyali) is a 960-hectare (2,400-acre) privately owned island in Boston Bay, Spencer Gulf, South Australia. It has been primarily used for grazing sheep and was also once the location of a proposed township called Kerrillyilla at the southern end of the island. In 2009, the island was rezoned to allow for future residential and tourism development. As of 2009, it is owned by the former mayor of Port Lincoln, Peter Davis. Davis' development plans include up to 1,000 residential allotments, three tourism developments and an inland marina. Prior to rezoning, there had been little interest expressed in the development plan, despite the then mayor's enthusiasm.

== Geographic features & nomenclature ==
The northernmost point of the island is Maria Point, the southernmost is Point Fanny and the westernmost is Hayden Point. Point Fanny was named after Fanny Conway, a favoured guest of Lady Gawler, wife of Governor Gawler. The Governor pledged to name the point after Conway's tent collapsed while she was camped there. She was traveling with a party arranged by Governor Gawler at the time.

The island's longest beaches are Squeaky Beach at the north (east of Maria Point) and Homestead Beach to the north-west. Picnic Beach on the eastern shore and Cemetery Beach on the central west coast are smaller. The bay between Point Fanny and Hayden Point is known as Rotten Bay. In 2010, attempts to formally rename Rotten Bay to either Bluefin Bay or Fishdance Bay were unsuccessful due to public opposition to the idea. It is believed that the origin of the name is a reflection of the quality of its anchorage.

== Wildlife ==
Fauna species of conservation concern recorded on Boston Island or in adjacent waters include: bush stone-curlew, pied oystercatcher, sooty oystercatcher, fairy tern, eastern osprey, white-bellied sea eagle, Australian sea lion, New Zealand fur seal and southern right whale.

=== Little penguin colony ===
Penguins were present on Boston Island in 1915. In 2006, Boston Island supported a small colony of less than 100 little penguins. As of 2011, the status of the colony is unknown.

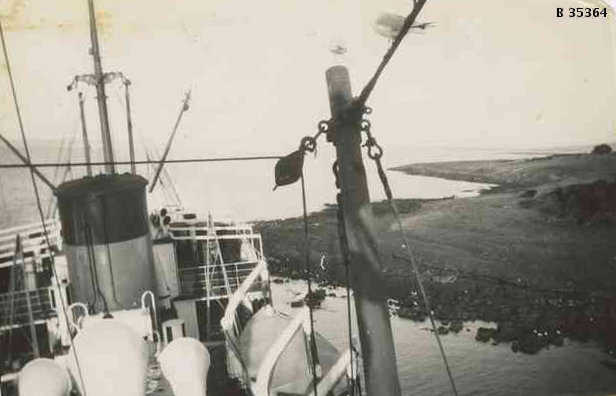
"Minnipa" aground at Boston Island, 29 May 1928 - State Library of South Australia B35364

== Mysterious object ==
On September 8, 2014 the Department of Defence investigated a suspected explosive mine located off the east coast of Boston Island. A public exclusion zone was established and a team of Navy clearance divers was deployed to identify the object, defuse it if armed and arrange for its safe disposal. Specialists of the Australian Navy did not find a sea mine.

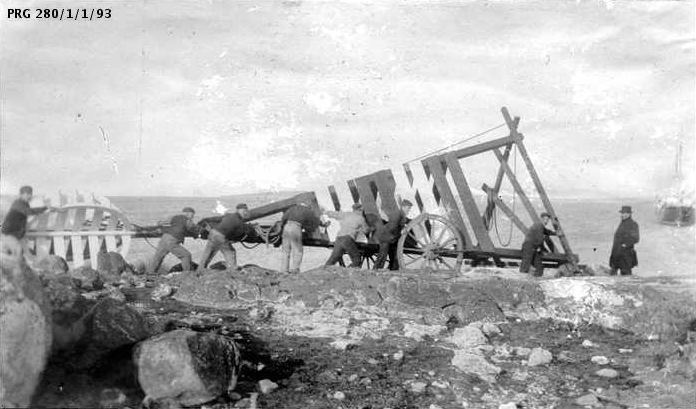
Men shifting a beacon at Point Fanny on Boston Island, 25 August 1905 - State Library of South Australia PRG 280/1/1/93

== History ==
In 1840, Boston Island was the location of choice for a future whaling station, intended to be operated by the Port Lincoln Whaling Company. There is no evidence the whaling station was actually established.

Mr and Mrs Jesse Lock were residents of Boston Island for a period during the 1800s.

In the 1850s a mission for the conversion of Indigenous Australians to Christianity operated on Boston Island by Archdeacon Hale. The mission was moved to Poonindie on the mainland because of the island's confined space was 'unsuited to the natives' way of life'. Availability of water was also likely to have been a factor.

In 1883, John Joseph Laffan was granted a Miscellaneous Lease No. 593 for a term of 21 years, over certain sections of land at the northern end of the island. After 12 months, the lease was forfeited for non-payment of rent.

In 1885, a member of the South Australian Yacht Club described Boston Island as 'undulating and grassy, with clumps of trees planted by the hand of nature in such a charming way as would render bankrupt the taste of a landscape gardener to approach in regard to effect; it is a place which once seen will live in the recollection ever afterwards.'

In November 1907, Joseph Kemp Bishop made application to bring all of Sec. 70; the Township of Kerrillyilla on Boston Island, under the Real Property Act by virtue of a sole uninterrupted possession by himself and predecessors for over 40 years (since 1859).

In 1909, Allotment 37 was transferred from John Ridley to Joseph Kemp Bishop. Under Certificate of Title, Volume 794, Folio 84, Joseph Kemp Bishop became the sole owner of the land once intended to be the Boston Island township.

In 1920, Joseph Kemp Bishop purchased the island from his father, Captain J. Bishop.

In 1928, the motor ship MS Minnipa of the Adelaide Steamship Company ran aground at Hayden Point, Boston Island in a thick fog. The 160 passengers aboard who had been traveling to Port Lincoln lighted in rafts and launches. She was refloated again two days later. She was then taken to Melbourne for assessment and repair. A Marine Enquiry was later held in Port Adelaide to investigate the circumstances and cause of the incident. The captain of the vessel was not found to be negligent in his actions.

In August 1939, Boston Island was described by a visitor from Melbourne as a 'green wonder... graceful and yet stately.' In 1950, Boston Island was purchased by Wilfred (Bill) Hogan of Calca Station, Streaky Bay district. At the time it was free of rabbits and foxes, and was running sheep, one to the acre.

In 1954, Boston Island was purchased by H. P. Davis of Hamilton Downs Station, Alice Springs for the price of £49,200. It was sold at auction in Port Lincoln before an audience of 500 people. At the time the island featured a five-roomed furnished weatherboard cottage, ten sheep-proof paddocks, five wells with windmills, four 5,000-gallon galvanized iron tanks and a large stone tank.
