= Spencer Gulf =

Large inlet in South Australia

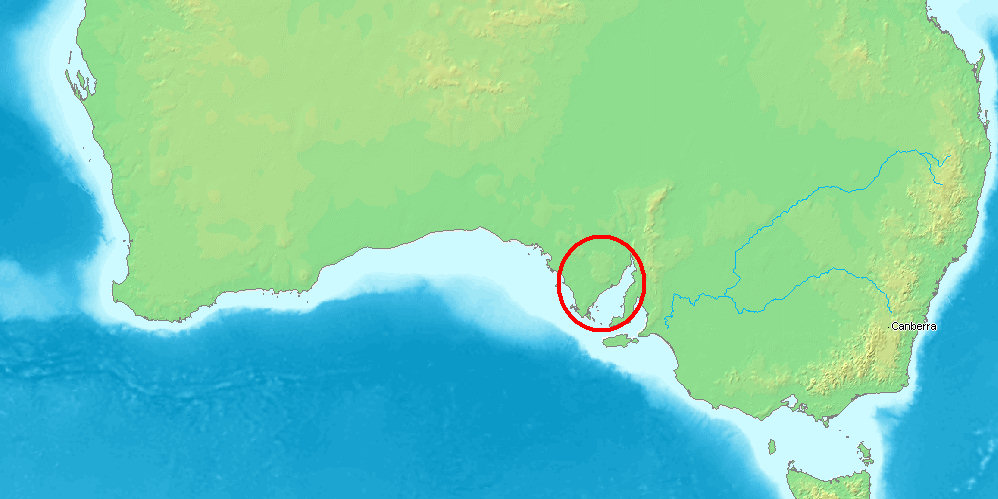
- Location of Spencer Gulf in Australia

- Location within South Australia Location within Australia
- Location: South Australia
- Coordinates: 34°25′S 136°45′E
- Type: Gulf
- Part of: Great Australian Bight
- Basin countries: Australia

The Spencer Gulf is the westernmost and larger of two large inlets (the other being Gulf St Vincent) on the southern coast of Australia, in the state of South Australia, facing the Great Australian Bight. It spans from the Cape Catastrophe and Eyre Peninsula in the west to Cape Spencer and Yorke Peninsula in the east.

The largest towns on the gulf are Port Lincoln, Whyalla, Port Pirie, and Port Augusta. Smaller towns on the gulf include Tumby Bay, Port Neill, Arno Bay, Cowell, Port Germein, Port Broughton, Wallaroo, Port Hughes, Port Victoria, Port Rickaby, Point Turton, and Corny Point.

== History ==
The first recorded exploration of the gulf was that of Matthew Flinders in February 1802. Flinders navigated inland from the present location of Port Augusta to within 44–39 km (27–24 mi) of the termination of the water body.

The gulf was named Spencer's Gulph by Flinders on 20 March 1802, after George John Spencer, the 2nd Earl Spencer. The Baudin expedition visited the gulf after Flinders with Nicholas Baudin giving it the name Golfe Bonaparte and Louis de Freycinet using the name Golfe de la Melomanie on the expedition's published charts.

By the 1830s, the natural harbour of Port Lincoln had become the site of an unofficial settlement, due in part to its convenience as a base for whaling vessels – which had long operated in the Great Australian Bight. Prior to the selection of Adelaide, some consideration was given to Port Lincoln as the potential site of a capital city.

== Geography and topography ==
The Gulf is 77 km (48 mi) wide at its mouth (from Cape Catastrophe to Cape Spencer) and 320 km (200 mi) long (from its mouth to Port Augusta). The western shore of the gulf is the Eyre Peninsula, while the eastern side is the Yorke Peninsula, which separates it from the smaller Gulf St Vincent. Its entrance was defined by Matthew Flinders in 1802 as a line from Cape Catastrophe on Eyre Peninsula to Cape Spencer on Yorke Peninsula. At the time of Flinders' exploration the gulf was noted to extend 298 km (185 mi) inland from a point near the Port Augusta crossing. This so-called extension of the gulf consists of a land depression and occasional watercourse known as the Pirie–Torrens corridor, and the inland waterbody Lake Torrens.

The northern end of the gulf is spanned by the Joy Baluch AM Bridge between Port Augusta and Port Augusta West and further north by Yorkey Crossing.

Informal names for subdivisions of the gulf waters are sometimes used. "Northern Spencer Gulf" refers to waters north of Wallaroo and Arno Bay, while "Southern Spencer Gulf" refers to waters south of that line, extending to the mouth of the gulf. "Upper Spencer Gulf" includes the waters north of Port Pirie, and includes the three towns sometimes referred to as the Iron Triangle: Whyalla, Port Augusta and Port Pirie. Its boundary lacks precise definition.

== Wildlife ==
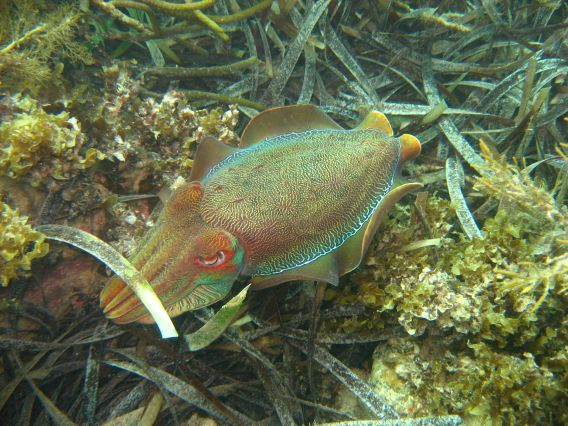
The world's largest known breeding aggregation of giant cuttlefish occurs in Spencer Gulf.

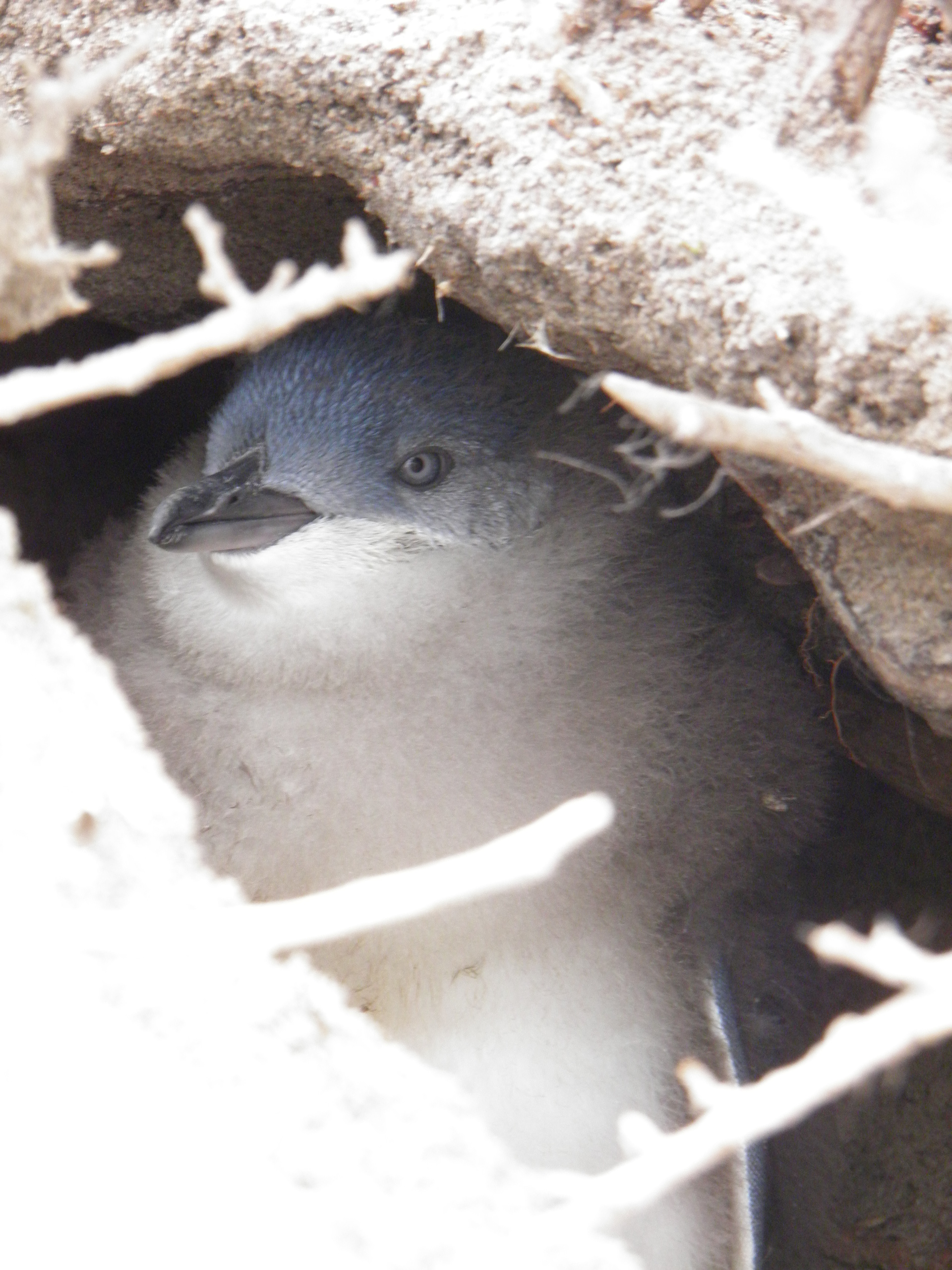
Little penguins breed on islands in Spencer Gulf.

The land surrounding the gulf, consisting of the Eyre and Yorke Peninsulas, is the Eyre Yorke Block bioregion. This was originally wooded shrubland but has now mainly been cleared for agriculture. The arid Gawler bioregion extends to the Spencer Gulf on the north-west. Many of South Australia's iconic marine species can be found on the shores and in the waters of Spencer Gulf.

=== Marine species ===
The rocky inshore reef along the coast near Port Bonython and Point Lowly is a breeding ground for the Northern Spencer Gulf population of Australian giant cuttlefish. They are a favorite food of local bottlenose dolphins, who have developed sophisticated techniques for safely eating these creatures. The Upper Spencer Gulf is also known for its snapper and Yellowtail kingfish fishing. Great white sharks are sometimes seen in Spencer Gulf by fishermen, and shark cage diving and surface tours operate out of Port Lincoln.

A relic population of tiger pipefish (Filicampus tigris), a subtropical species is range limited to Northern Spencer Gulf.

=== Marine mammals ===
Visiting southern right whales and humpback whales enter Spencer Gulf from June through to October, and can be seen as far north as Point Lowly and Port Augusta. New Zealand fur seals and Australian sea lions can be found in southern Spencer Gulf, with significant breeding colonies located at Dangerous Reef and in the Sir Joseph Banks Group. Occasional sightings occurring in Northern Spencer Gulf. Bottlenose dolphins can be seen in the gulf's waters year-round.

=== Seabirds ===
Breeding colonies of little penguins exist on islands in Spencer Gulf. The northernmost colonies are located at Lipson Island and Wardang Island. In 2004, the Wardang Island colony's population was approximately 8,000 penguins. Cape Barren geese and several species of cormorants also breed on islands in Spencer Gulf.

== Islands ==
Spencer Gulf contains a number of inshore and offshore islands. These include (from north to south):

- Curlew Island (south of Port Augusta)
- Weeroona Island (north of Port Pirie)
- Shag Island (north of Port Broughton)
- Entrance Island (near Cowell)
- Bird Islands (near Wallaroo)
- Lipson Island (north of Tumby Bay)
- Tumby Island (south of Tumby Bay)
- Wardang Island & the Goose Island group (near Port Victoria)
- The Sir Joseph Banks Group (offshore from Tumby Bay)
- Louth Island & Rabbit Island (in Louth Bay)
- Boston Island (in Boston Bay)
- Grantham Island and Bicker Isles (in Proper Bay)
- Donington Island, Carcase Rock, Owen Island, Taylor Island, Grindal Island, Little Island, Lewis Island, Smith Island, Hopkins Island and Thistle Island (east of the Jussieu Peninsula).
- Middle Island, South Island and Royston Island (in Pondalowie Bay)
- Gambier Islands including Wedge Island (in the mouth of Spencer Gulf)

== Port development proposals ==
Due to its proximity to many identified mineral deposits in South Australia's Far North, Eyre Peninsula and Braemar regions, there are multiple new port and harbour developments proposed for the region.

These include new or expanded facilities at (from north to south):

- Port Bonython - Port Bonython Bulk Commodities Export Facility - Spencer Gulf Port Link (proposed 2012)
- Port Playford - Iron ore transshipment port proposed to be constructed on the site of the former Playford A Power Station, south of Port Augusta
- Whyalla - Inner harbour expansion - Arrium (completed 2013)
- Port Pirie - Possible expansion for trans-shipment of iron ore from the Braemar region (concept stage)
- Lucky Bay - Lucky Bay Common User Export Facility (harbour expansion) - SeaSA (proposed 2013, construction commenced 2014)
- Myponie Point - Possible port location for Braemar region mineral exports (concept stage)
- Cape Hardy - Iron Road Limited (proposed 2013)
- Lipson Cove - Port Spencer (formerly known as Sheep Hill) - Centrex Metals (proposed 2011) The port could be completed in 2023.

== Seawater desalination plants ==
In 2022, the government of South Australia announced the Northern Water Supply Project, which as of 2023, is considering a business case for establishing a large seawater desalination plant in the upper Spencer Gulf. If constructed, water will be supplied for use to the Olympic Dam and Carapateena copper mines in the state's far north. It is also intended to supply water for a prospective hydrogen export industry. An environmental impact statement for the project is anticipated mid-2024.

As of 2016, one reverse osmosis and one thermal seawater desalination plant draw water from Spencer Gulf. Several others are planned. All currently or will produce water primarily or exclusively for industrial use. They are:

Location	Company	Production capacity (GL/year)	Purpose	Status
Whyalla	Arrium	1.6	Whyalla Steelworks industrial supply	Commissioned 2011, operating
Port Augusta	Sundrop Farms	3	Growing vegetables	Operational in October 2016
Point Lowly	BHP	100	Olympic Dam mine mineral processing	Approved 2011, not constructed
Upper Spencer Gulf (multiple candidate sites under consideration)	SA Water	94.9	Olympic Dam mine, Carapateena mine, hydrogen production	Northern Water Supply Project business case under development in 2023
Lipson Cove	Centrex Metals	5-20	For iron ore slurry pipeline	Proposed 2013, not constructed
Myponie Point	Braemar Alliance	20-50	For iron ore slurry pipeline	Concept stage

== Spencer Gulf in film and video ==
The Spencer Gulf region, its wildlife and its development are the subjects of a documentary film in production (as of 2020) entitled Cuttlefish Country.

== Protected areas ==
=== Reserves declared by the South Australian government ===
==== Aquatic reserves ====
Spencer Gulf contains four aquatic reserves.

Blanche Harbour-Douglas Bank Aquatic Reserve which is located in west side of Spencer Gulf, north of Whyalla, was declared in 1980 'for fisheries management, protection of its mangrove-seagrass communities and associated fish nursery areas.'

Goose Island Aquatic Reserve which is located at Goose Island on the east side of Spencer Gulf near Port Victoria was d eclared in 1971 to provide 'a conservation area where teaching institutions may conduct classes and scientific research on marine biology and ecology and to protect the habitat of the seal colony situated on White Rocks.'

Whyalla - Cowleds Landing Aquatic Reserve which is located on the west side of Spencer Gulf, just south of Whyalla, was declared in 1980 to 'protect the mangrove-seagrass communities and associated fish nursery areas.'

Yatala Harbour Upper Spencer Gulf Aquatic Reserve which is located in Yatala Harbour on the east side of Spencer Gulf, north of Port Pirie, was declared in 1980 for 'the protection of its mangrove-seagrass communities and associated fish nursery areas.'

==== Marine parks ====
Spencer Gulf contains five marine parks, each with its own outer boundary and internal zoning. Fishing is prohibited with Sanctuary Zones, and detailed maps and GPS coordinates for the parks are available from the Government of South Australia's Department of Environment, Water & Natural Resources.

The marine parks within Spencer Gulf are (from north to south):

- Upper Spencer Gulf Marine Park
- Franklin Harbor Marine Park
- Eastern Spencer Gulf Marine Park
- Sir Joseph Banks Group Marine Park
- Southern Spencer Gulf Marine Park

===== Cuttlefish Coast Sanctuary Zone =====
The Cuttlefish Coast Sanctuary Zone is within the Upper Spencer Gulf Marine Park. This area, 63 km (39 mi) south of Port Augusta and 15 km (9.3 mi) northeast of Whyalla, was inscribed on the National Heritage List on 24 February 2023, as it is "of outstanding significance to Australia as the largest known breeding habitat of the giant Australian cuttlefish (Sepia apama)". The rocky reef provides a protective shelter for the cuttlefish, which attach their eggs on the underside of rocks or in crevices.

Within the sanctuary, the largest and densest breeding aggregation of cuttlefish in the world occurs annually from May to August, with intense competition between male cuttlefish leading to complex behaviours and spectacular massed displays of colour and shapeshifting. The cuttlefish in this area face several threats, including vulnerability to the impact of commercial fishing. These risks are being managed by the South Australian Government through protection in a marine protection area and fishing bans. Other possible risks are pollution from industrial sites or plastic pollution being washed in on the tide.

In August 2025, the state and federal governments provided funding of almost $700,000 to install a bubble curtain to protect the giant cuttlefish in the Upper Spencer Gulf during their breeding season from the harmful algal bloom that began on the Fleurieu Peninsula in March, and had not yet dissipated. The curtain would protect approximately 50,000 to 80,000 eggs and hatchlings. However, the bloom had not reached the Upper Spencer Gulf by October 2025.

==== Terrestrial reserves ====
A number of terrestrial reserves either adjoin Spencer Gulf at low water or are located on islands within the gulf. On the west coast of the gulf, from north to south, they are Munyaroo Conservation Park, Franklin Harbor Conservation Park, Lipson Island Conservation Park, Tumby Island Conservation Park, Sir Joseph Banks Group Conservation Park, Lincoln National Park and Memory Cove Wilderness Protection Area. On the east coast of the gulf, from north to south, they are Winninowie Conservation Park, Bird Islands Conservation Park, Goose Island Conservation Park, Leven Beach Conservation Park and Innes National Park. At the mouth of the gulf, the Gambier Islands Conservation Park is located within the Gambier Islands group.

=== Non-statutory arrangements ===
==== Important Bird Areas ====
Three Important Bird Areas (IBAs) have been nominated by BirdLife International at locations in Spencer Gulf. The Spencer Gulf Important Bird Area lies along the north-eastern coast of the Gulf; it comprises a 460 square kilometres (180 square miles) strip of coastal land consisting mainly of intertidal mudflats, mangroves and salt marshes. It was identified as an IBA by BirdLife International because of its importance for the conservation of waders, or shorebirds. The other two IBAs within Spencer Gulf are located in the Sir Joseph Banks Group and at Goose Island. Both sites contain breeding colonies of various island seabird species.

== Gallery ==
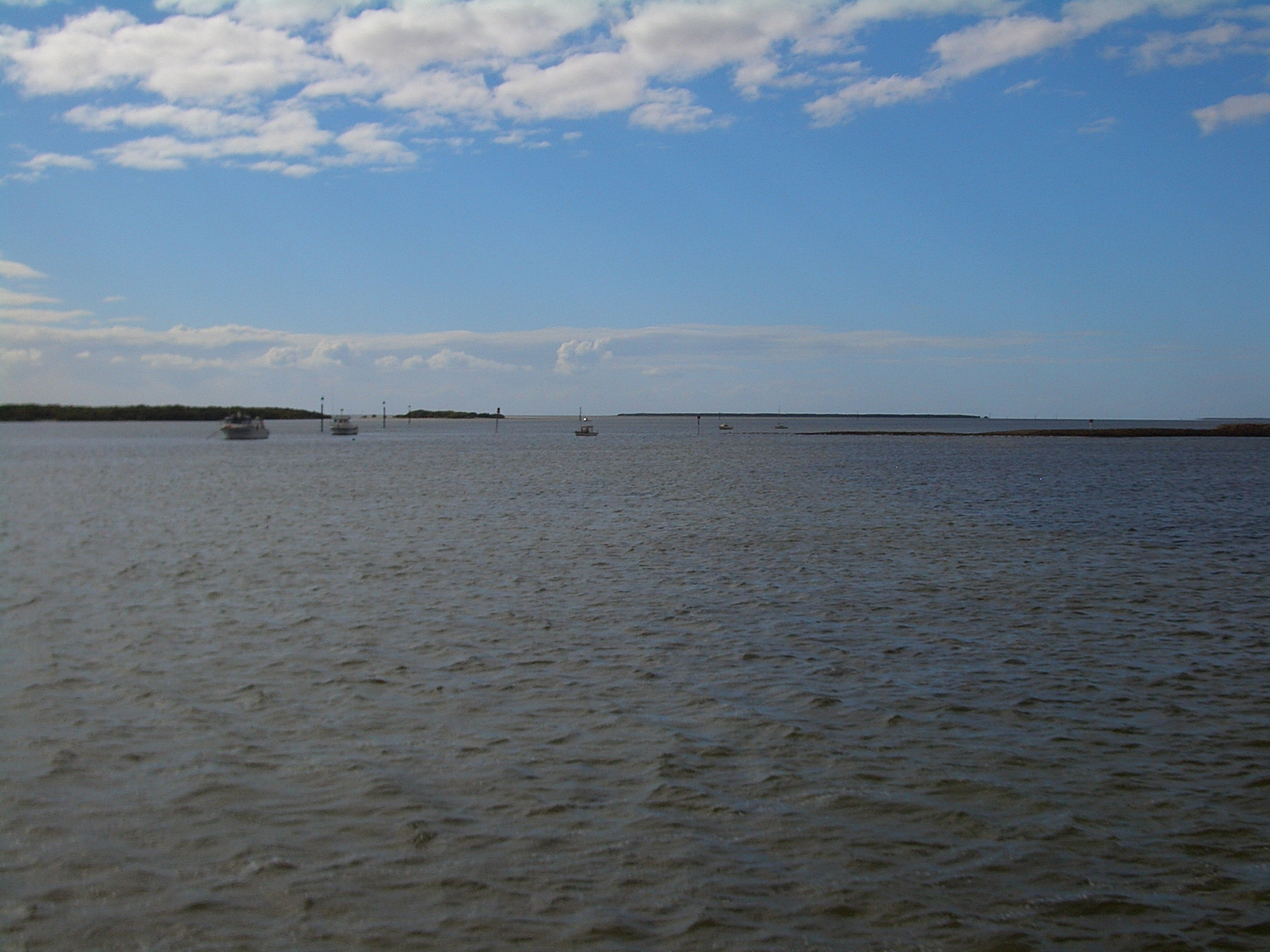
The harbor of Port Broughton on the Eastern shore of Spencer Gulf

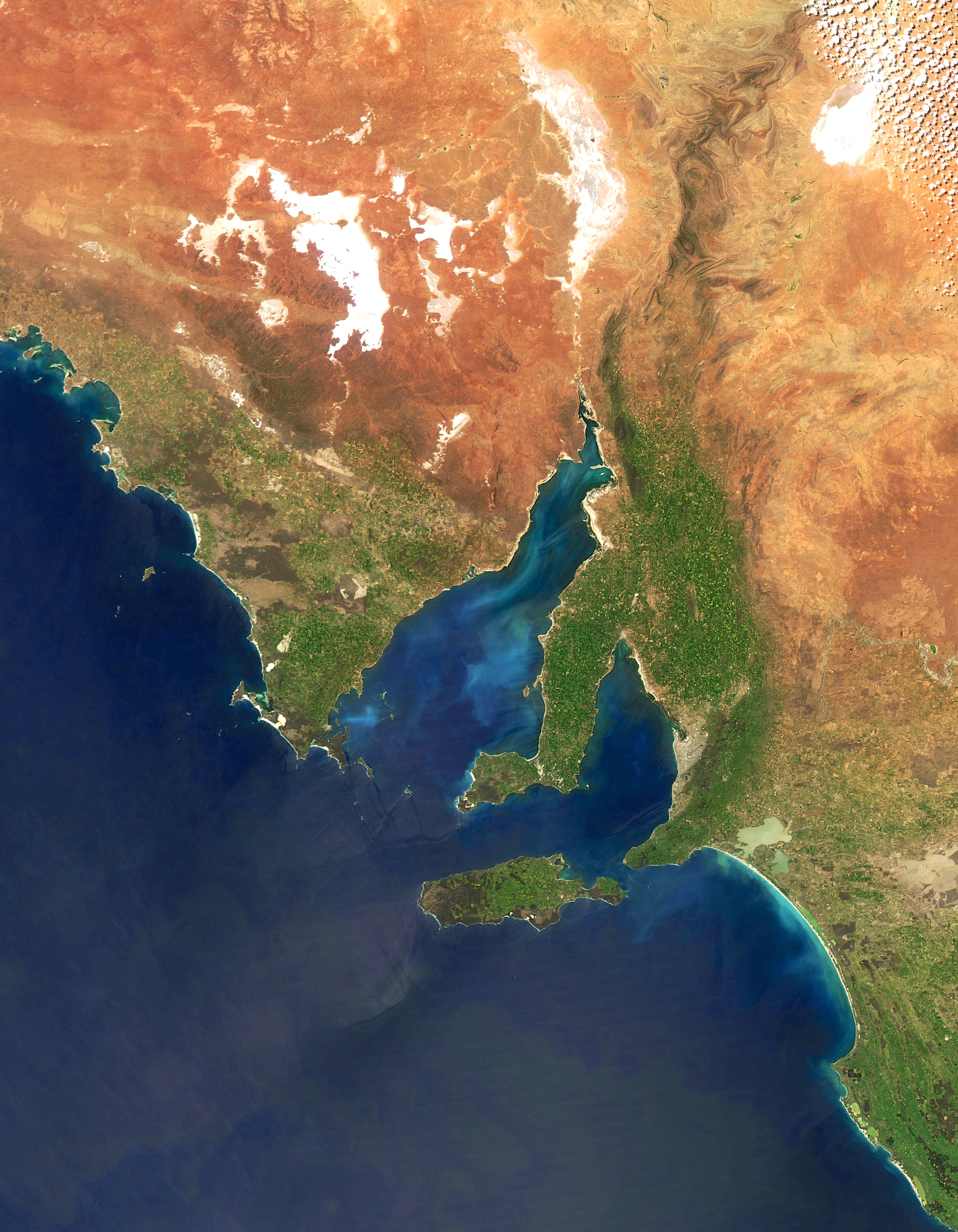
Spencer Gulf seen from one of NASA's Satellites

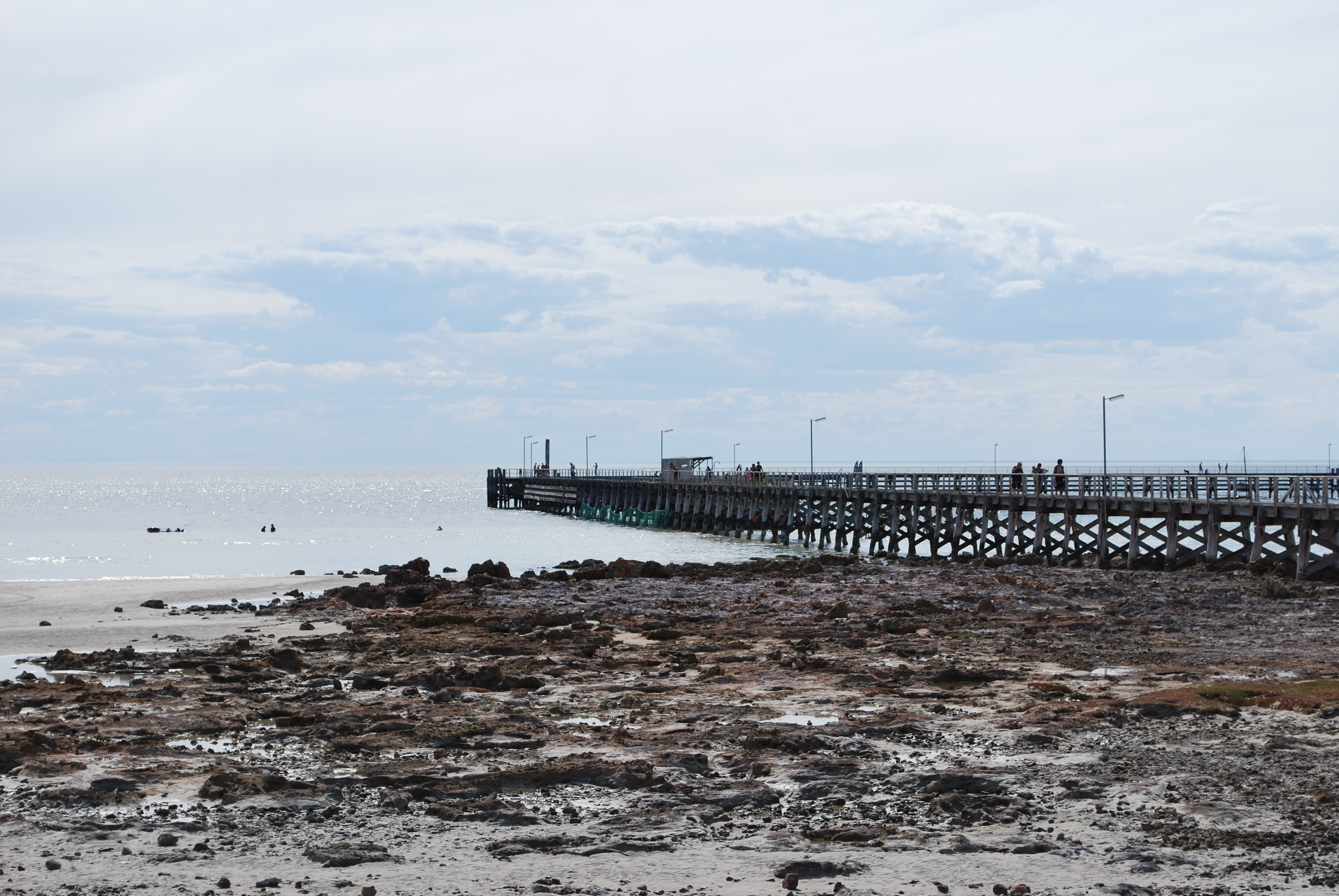
Moonta Bay Jetty on the Eastern shore of Spencer Gulf
