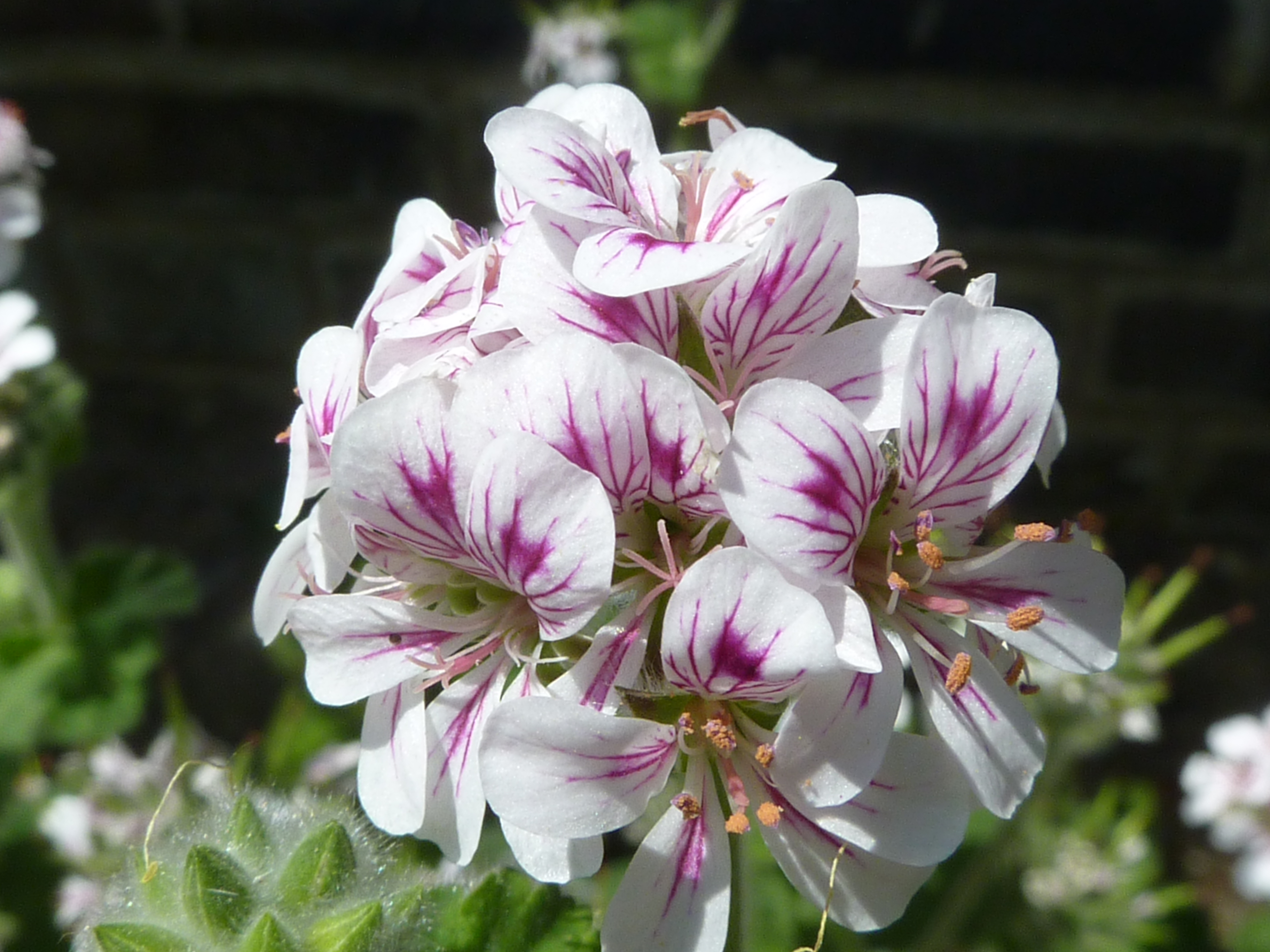
- Flowers: Cambridge University Botanic Garden
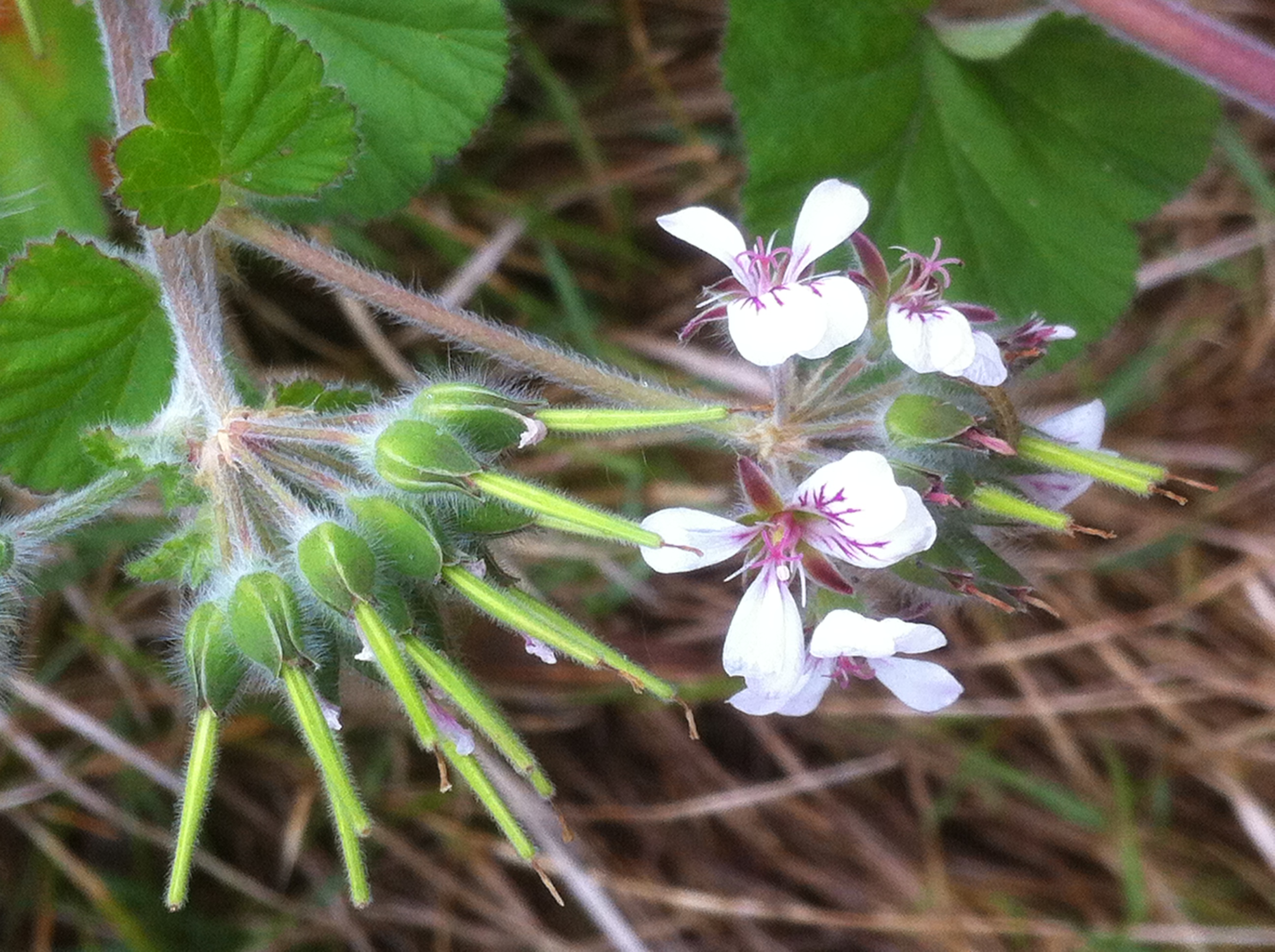
- Flowers & fruit: Palm Beach, New South Wales

Scientific classification
- Kingdom: Plantae
- Clade: Tracheophytes
- Clade: Angiosperms
- Clade: Eudicots
- Clade: Rosids
- Order: Geraniales
- Family: Geraniaceae
- Genus: Pelargonium
- Species: P. australe

Binomial name
- Pelargonium australe Willd.
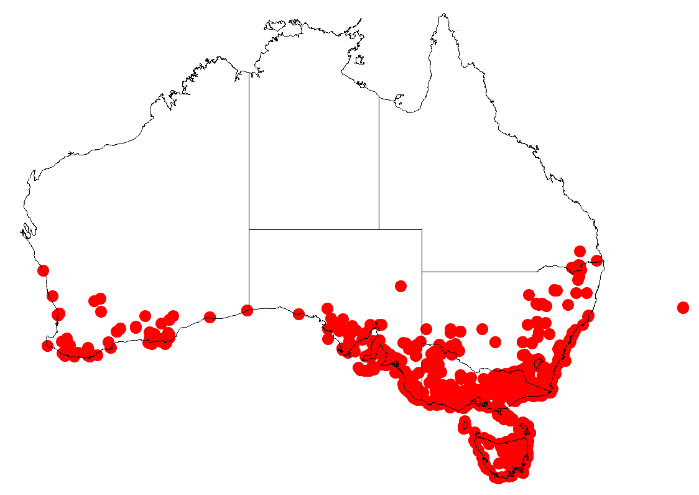
- Occurrence data from AVH

Synonyms
- Geraniospermum australe (Willd.) Kuntze; Geranium australe (Willd.) Poir. Geranium glomeratum Andrews; Hoarea nummularifolia Sweet

= Pelargonium australe =

Species of plant

Pelargonium australe is a perennial herb that is endemic to Australia, and found in all states except the Northern Territory. Common names include native storksbill, wild geranium and austral storksbill.

== Description ==
The species grows to 50 cm high and has leaves with 5 to 7 lobes. Umbels of 4 to 12 flowers appear between October and March in the species' native range. These are pink with darker markings.

== Taxonomy ==
The species was first formally described in 1800 by German botanist Carl Ludwig Willdenow.

== Distribution and habitat ==
It occurs on sand dunes, coastal cliffs and rocky outcrops.

== Cultivation ==
In cultivation, the species prefers a sunny or lightly shaded position and is adaptable to a wide range of soil types. It is readily propagated by cuttings.

P. australe: showing the hairy leaves, stems, bracts and other hairy parts

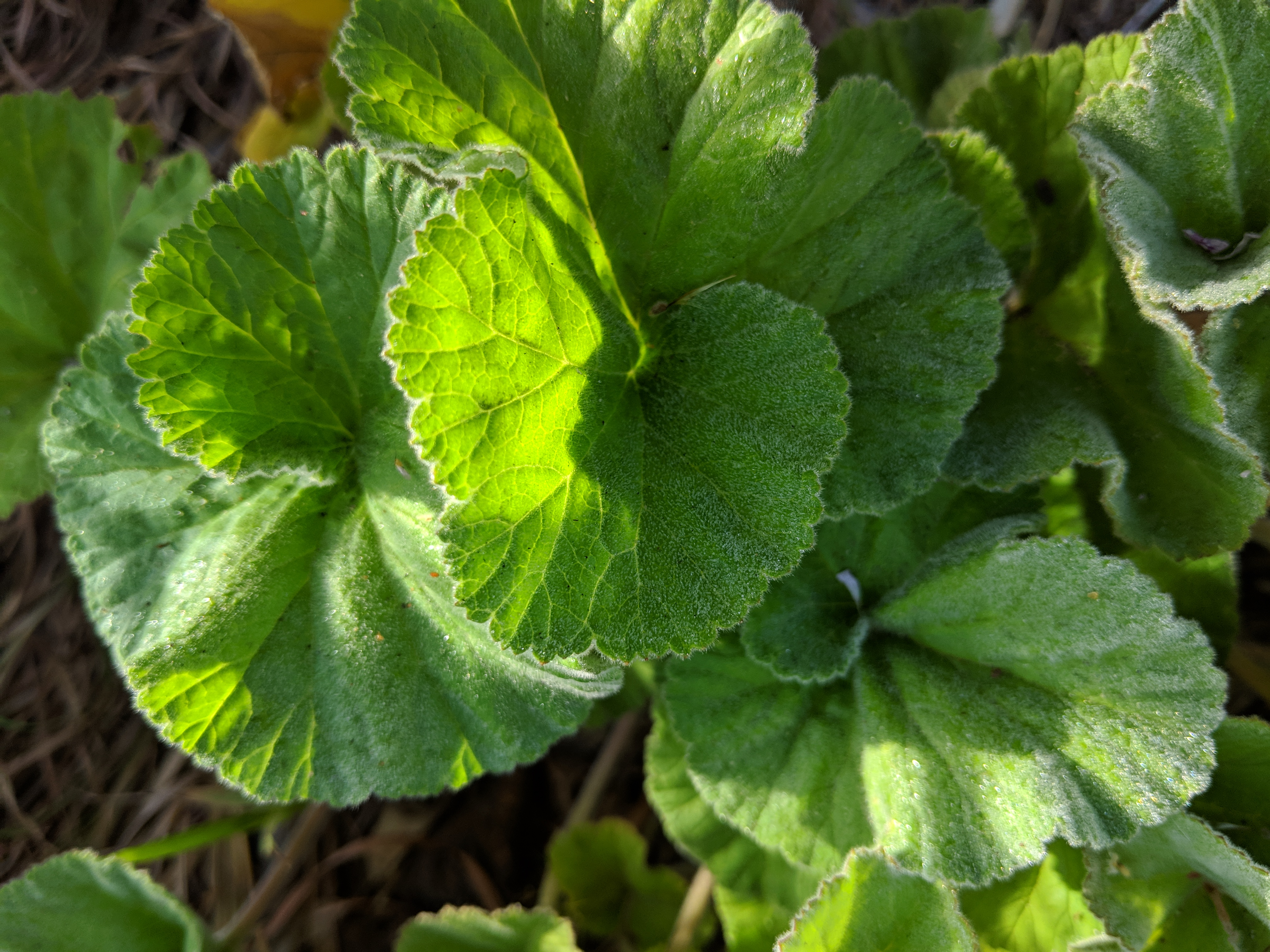

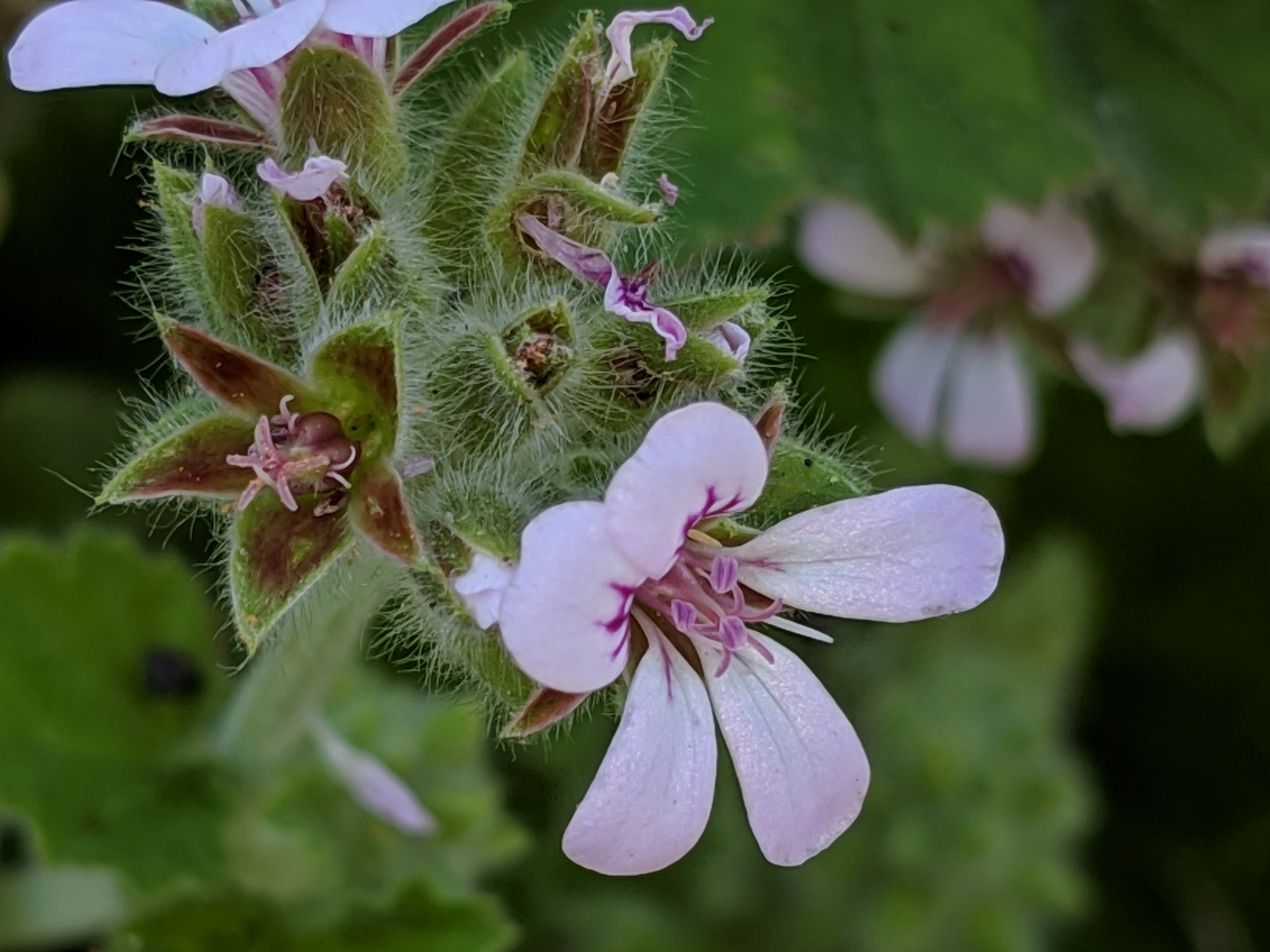

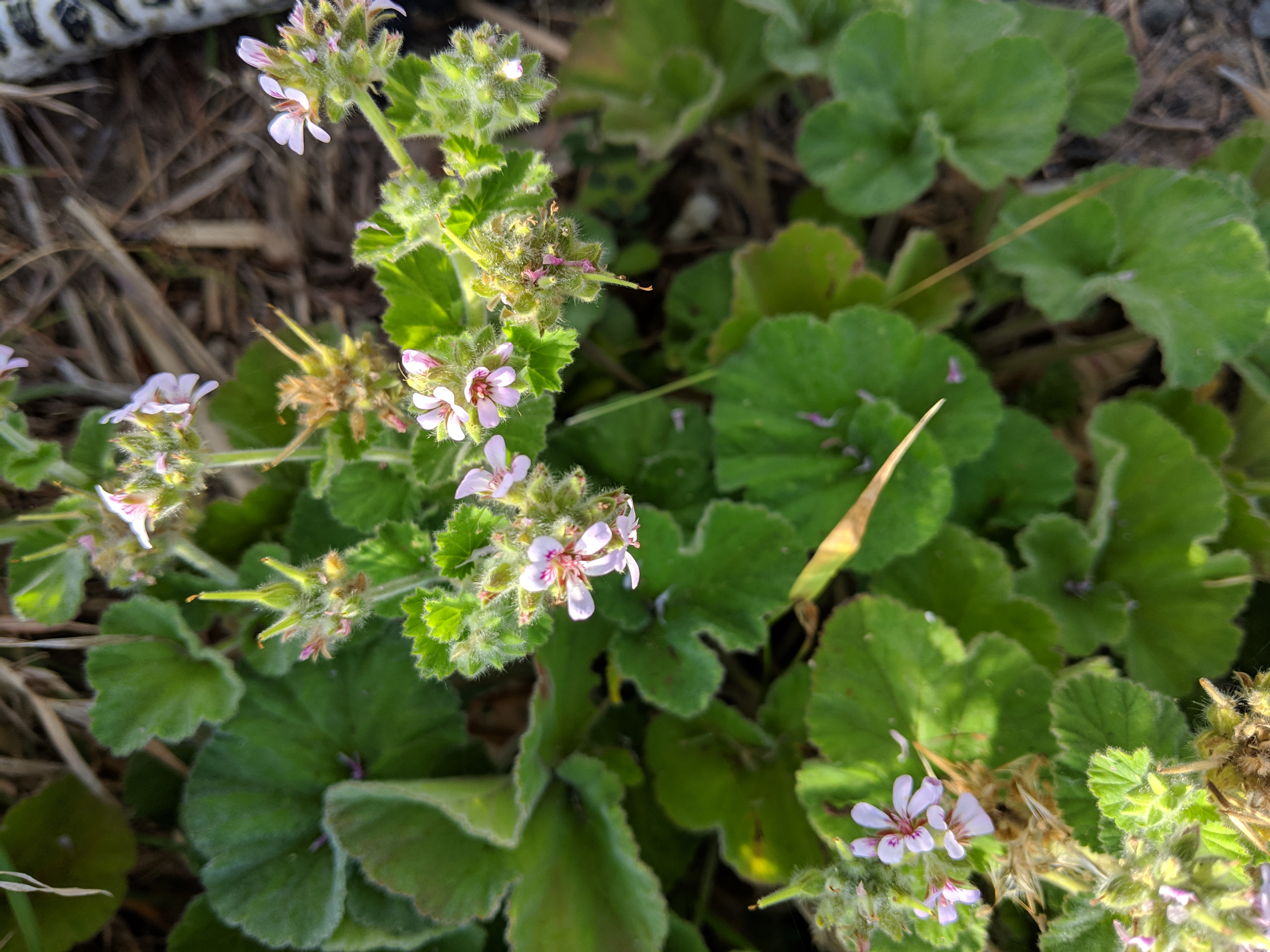
