= Memory Cove =

- Location in South Australia
- Location: Eyre Peninsula, South Australia
- Coordinates: 34°57′37″S 135°59′29″E
- Type: Bay
- Basin countries: Australia

Memory Cove is a bay located on the East coast of Jussieu Peninsula on Eyre Peninsula in South Australia approximately 15 kilometres (9.3 mi) South-East of Port Lincoln.

It is one of the natural features named by Matthew Flinders in memory of the eight crew who were lost on a cutter that capsized sometime after being launched from HM Sloop Investigator to search for water on 21 February 1802.

Since 2004, the coastline enclosing the bay has been part of the Memory Cove Wilderness Protection Area.

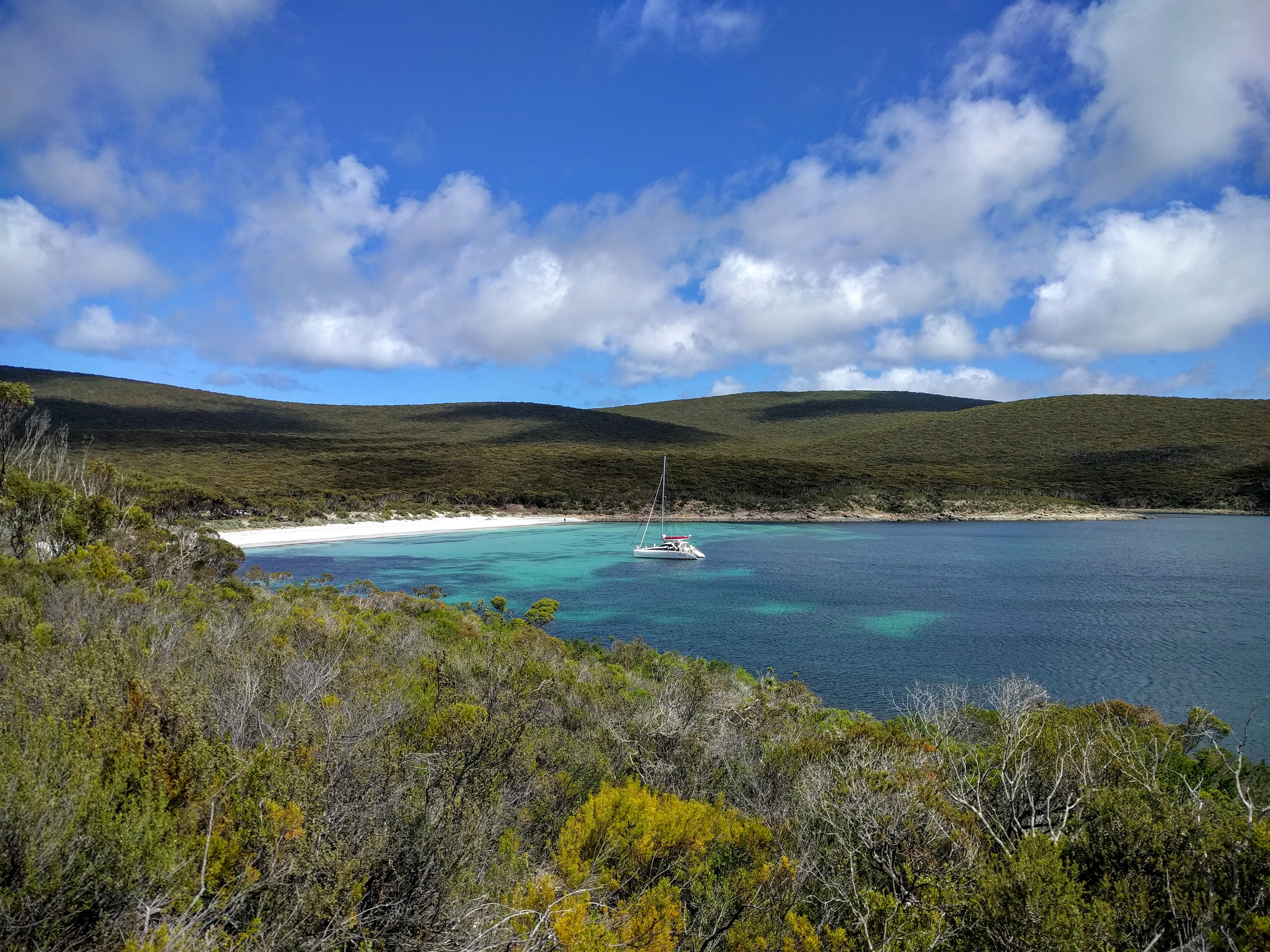
Memory Cove with Sailing Yacht Arriba at anchor
