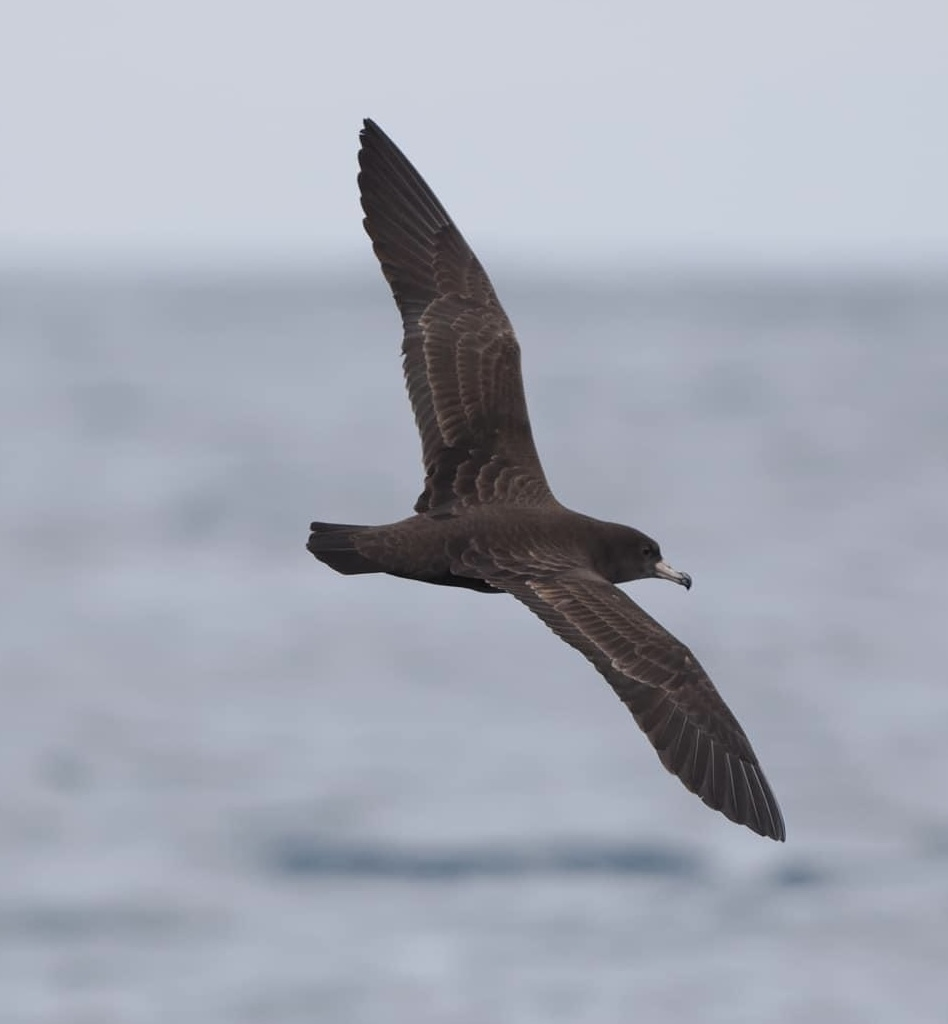

Conservation status
- Near Threatened (IUCN 3.1)

Scientific classification
- Kingdom: Animalia
- Phylum: Chordata
- Class: Aves
- Order: Procellariiformes
- Family: Procellariidae
- Genus: Ardenna
- Species: A. carneipes

Binomial name
- Ardenna carneipes (Gould, 1844)

= Flesh-footed shearwater =

Species of bird

The flesh-footed shearwater (Ardenna carneipes), also called sable shearwater or toanui, is a medium-large shearwater that mainly inhabits the Indo-Pacific. Its plumage is black with pale pinkish feet, and a pale bill with a distinct black tip. Together with the equally light-billed pink-footed shearwater, it forms the Hemipuffinus group, a superspecies which may or may not have an Atlantic relative in the great shearwater. These large shearwaters are among those that have been separated into the genus Ardenna. Recent genetic analysis indicates evidence of strong divergence between Pacific colonies relative to those in South and Western Australia, thought to be explained by philopatry and differences in foraging strategies during the breeding season.

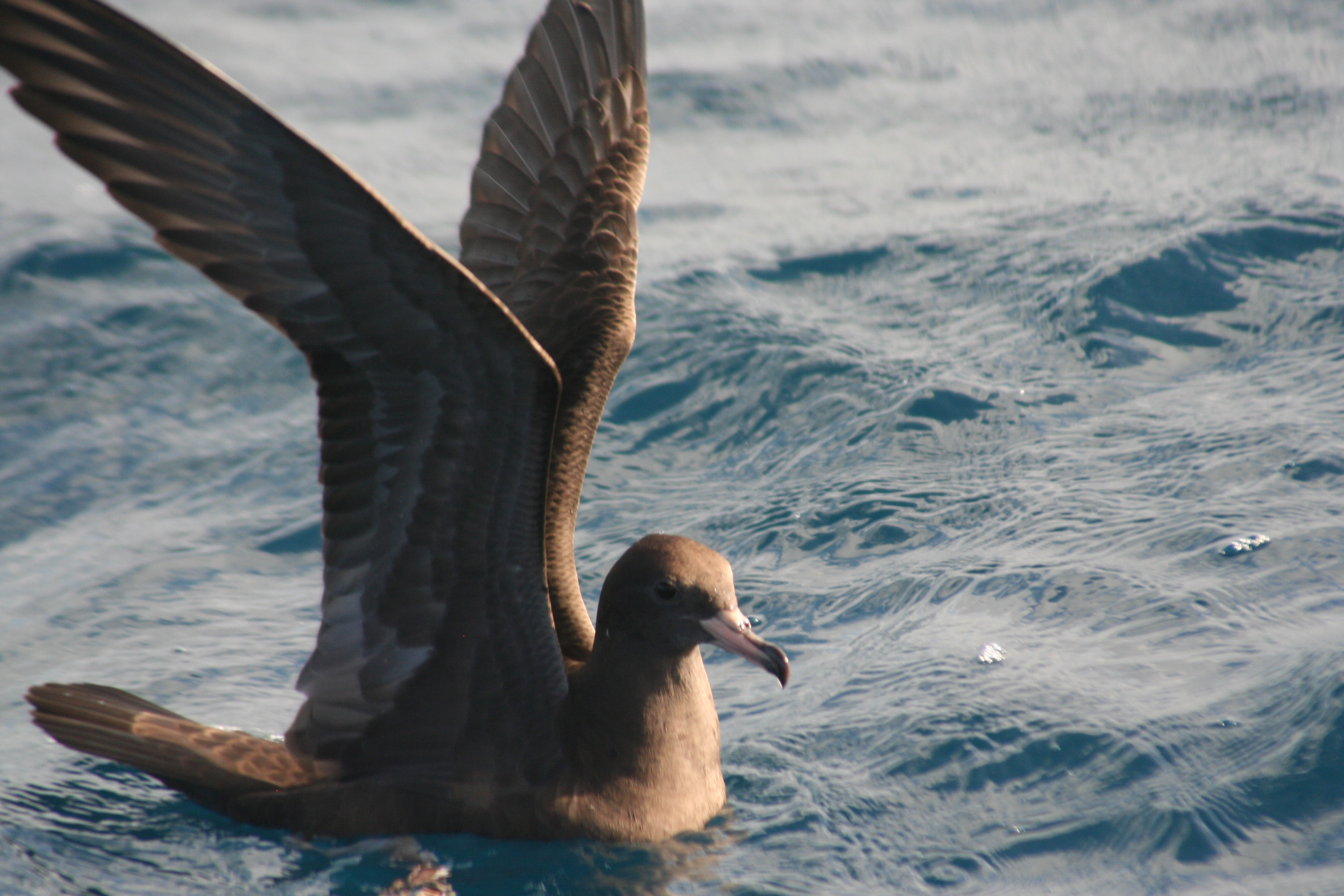
Ardenna carneipes

A molecular phylogenetic study published in 2021 found very little genetic difference between the flesh-footed shearwater and the pink-footed shearwater (Ardenna creatopus). The authors of the study suggested that these two taxa might be better considered as conspecific.

The flesh-footed shearwater breeds in colonies, and has two main breeding areas; one in the southwest Pacific Ocean includes Lord Howe Island (22,654 pairs), South Australia (about 1,800 pairs breeding on two islands) and northern New Zealand (13,000 pairs); the other population comprises no more than 36,000 pairs breeding on 42 islands along the coast of Western Australia from Cape Leeuwin to the Recherche Archipelago. Another 500 pairs breed on St Paul Island in the Indian Ocean. A record of birds on Astola Island of Pakistan in the Arabian Sea is unconfirmed. Recent evidence suggests populations are declining across much of the species' range. The species was recently listed as near threatened in Australia and nationally vulnerable in New Zealand, and has been recommended for listing under the Agreement on the Conservation of Albatrosses and Petrels. At the state level, the species is listed as vulnerable in Western Australia and New South Wales and rare in South Australia.

The species occurs as a (boreal) summer visitor in the North Pacific Ocean, where potentially large numbers are taken as bycatch in fisheries. The species also suffers from climate related impacts and significant heavy metal contamination, the cause of which is not fully understood, but is likely due to the ingestion of significant quantities of plastic, which the birds mistake for food floating on the ocean surface.

== Name ==
In 2024, the alternative name sable shearwater was proposed.
