= Cape Catastrophe =

Headland in South Australia

Cape Catastrophe Lincoln National Park, South Australia
- Coordinates: 34°59′12″S 136°00′05″E

Cape Catastrophe is a headland in the Australian state of South Australia located at the southeast tip of Jussieu Peninsula on Eyre Peninsula. It is one of the natural features named by the British navigator Matthew Flinders in memory of the eight crew who were lost from a cutter that capsized sometime after being launched from HM Sloop Investigator to search for water on 21 February 1802. Flinders also nominated the headland as being the western point of the mouth of Spencer Gulf. It is currently located within the gazetted locality of Lincoln National Park and the protected area known as the Memory Cove Wilderness Protection Area.
