= HMS Investigator (1801) =

Sloop of the Royal Navy

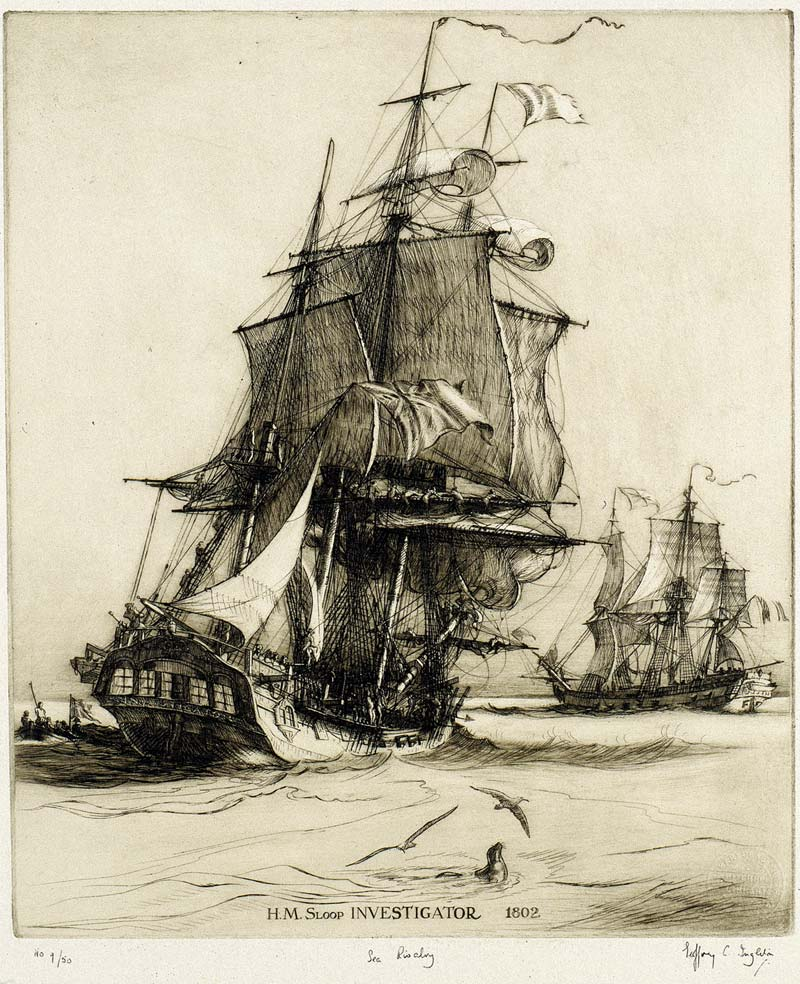
- 20th-century drawing of HMS Investigator.

History

Great Britain
- Name: Fram
- Builder: Unknown, at Monkwearmouth, Sunderland
- Launched: 1795
- Fate: Sold 1798
- Notes: Collier

Great Britain
- Name: HMS Xenophon
- Acquired: 1798
- Renamed: HMS Investigator (1801)
- Fate: Sold 1810

United Kingdom
- Name: Xenophon
- Acquired: 1810 by purchase
- Fate: Broken up about 1872

General characteristics
- Tons burthen: HMS:33368/94 (bm); 1840:352 (bm); Hulk:367
- Length: HMS; 100 ft 4 in (30.6 m) (overall); 77 ft 8 in (23.7 m) (keel); Hulk: 101 ft 5 in (30.9 m) (overall)
- Beam: HMS: 28 ft 5 in (8.7 m); Hulk: 28 ft 2 in (8.6 m)
- Draught: 15 ft (4.6 m)
- Depth of hold: HMS:11 ft 0 in (3.4 m); Hulk:18 ft 9 in (5.7 m)
- Propulsion: Sails
- Sail plan: Sloop
- Complement: 80
- Armament: As sloop: 18 × 32-pounder carronades + 2 × 18-pounder carronades; As discovery vessel: 6 × 12-pounder carronades + 2 × 18-pounder carronades + 2 × long 6-pounder cannon + 2 × 1/2-pounder swivel guns

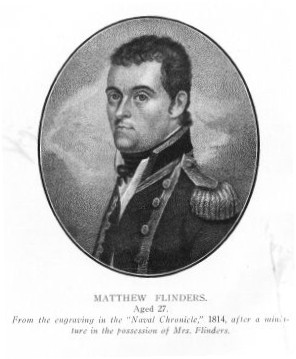
Matthew Flinders, commander of HMS Investigator.

HMS Investigator was built as the mercantile Fram (not to be confused with the Norwegian polar exploration vessel, Fram) and launched in 1795. Purchased in 1798 by the Royal Navy she was renamed HMS Xenophon, and then in 1801 converted to a survey ship under the name HMS Investigator. In 1802, under the command of Matthew Flinders, she was the first ship to circumnavigate Australia. The Navy sold her in 1810 and she returned to mercantile service under the name Xenophon. She was probably broken up c.1872.

== Background ==
Fram was built in Sunderland as a collier. She operated off the north-east coast of England before the Royal Navy purchased her in 1798. Pitcher, of Northfield refitted her between 27 April and 24 May 1798. She then went to Deptford Dockyard on 6 August. The Navy armed her with 22 carronades to serve as an escort vessel, and renamed her HMS Xenophon.

Commander George Sayer commissioned Xenophon as an armed ship for the North Sea. In 1799 he brought the Irish rebel James Napper Tandy and some of his associates as state prisoners from Hamburg to England. Around February 1800 Sayer removed to HMS Inspector.

== Australian voyage ==
At the urging of the naturalist Sir Joseph Banks, the Admiralty decided to launch an expedition to map the Australian coastline, as well as further study the plant and animal life on the new colony. Attached to the expedition was the botanist Robert Brown, the botanical artist Ferdinand Bauer and the landscape artist William Westall. The Admiralty chose Xenophon for the expedition: her former mercantile role meant that she had a small draught and ample space for supplies, making her particularly suitable for a long exploratory voyage. On the other hand, she was in relatively poor condition, and could therefore be spared from service in the war against France.

The Navy had Xenophon fitted as a discovery ship at Sheerness between November 1800 and March 1801, and renamed her Investigator. The refitting included making additional cabins for scientists and space on the deck for plant specimens. The armament was reduced to two guns and eight carronades (six 12-pounder and two 18-pounder), providing additional storage space.

On 19 January 1801, the Navy appointed Lieutenant Flinders commander of the Investigator, and he arrived to take command on 25 January. He would later write:

The Investigator was a north-country-built ship, of three-hundred and thirty-four tons; and, in form, nearly resembled the description of a vessel recommended by Captain Cook as best calculated for voyages of discovery. She had been purchased some years before into His Majesty's service; and having been newly coppered and repaired, was considered to be the best vessel which could, at that time, be spared for the projected voyage to Terra Australis.

— Matthew Flinders

== Circumnavigation (6 Dec 1801 – 9 June 1803) ==
Investigator set sail from Spithead for Australia on 18 July 1801, calling at the Cape of Good Hope before crossing the Indian Ocean and sighting Cape Leeuwin off South West Australia on 6 December 1801. The expedition put into King George Sound (Albany) for a month before beginning a running survey of the Great Australian Bight, which stretched 2,300 kilometres (1,400 mi) to Spencer Gulf.

On 21 February 1802 a tragic accident occurred when a shore party, which included ship's master John Thistle, midshipman William Taylor and six seamen, was lost when a boat capsized attempting to return to the ship at dusk in choppy waters. No bodies were recovered. Flinders named the headland Cape Catastrophe, and the area which he had anchored Memory Cove.

Proceeding into the gulf, Flinders surveyed Port Lincoln (which he named after his home county). Working eastwards Investigator next charted Kangaroo Island, Yorke Peninsula and St Vincent Gulf. On 8 April, at Encounter Bay, a surprise meeting with Géographe under Nicolas Baudin was cordial, the two navigators being unaware the Treaty of Amiens had only just been signed, and both believed the two countries were still at war with one another.

Sailing eastward through Bass Strait, Investigator visited King Island and Port Phillip before arriving at Port Jackson on 9 May 1802. Investigator spent the next ten weeks preparing and took aboard 12 new men, including an Aboriginal person named Bungaree with whom Flinders had previously sailed on the sloop Norfolk. On 22 July Investigator left Port Jackson, sailing north in company with the brig Lady Nelson. Lady Nelson sailed poorly after losing her keels and Flinders ordered her back to Port Jackson.

Investigator hugged the east coast, passed through the Great Barrier Reef and transited Torres Strait, which Flinders had previously sailed with Captain William Bligh on HMS Providence. While she was surveying the Gulf of Carpentaria the ship's timbers were examined; the dockyard refit/conversion had failed to rectify and fix major faults with the ship, and as the voyage to Australia had revealed, she was in poor shape: the wood was rotting and there were serious extensive leaks. The ship's carpenter reported that she would not last more than six months.

Flinders sailed to the Dutch settlement in Timor hoping to find a replacement, but was unsuccessful. By now a number of the crew were unwell with numerous diseases, such as dysentery and scurvy, so Flinders reluctantly cut short the survey and sailed back to Port Jackson "[with] all possible sail, day and night" to undergo repairs. This meant abandoning his desire for a running survey on the north and west coasts of Australia.

Flinders did, however, complete the circumnavigation of Australia, but not without lightening the ship by jettisoning two wrought-iron anchors. These were found and recovered in 1973 by divers at Middle Island, and lifted from the water and carried to port by the MV Cape Don Archipelago of the Recherche, Western Australia. The best bower anchor is on display at the South Australian Maritime Museum while the stream anchor can be seen at the National Museum of Australia.

Investigator reached Port Jackson on 9 June 1803 and, on her return to Sydney, Governor Philip Gidley King requested that a survey of the vessel be carried out:

being the state of the Investigator thus far, we think it altogether unnecessary to make any further examination; being unanimously of opinion that she is not worth repairing in any country, and that it is impossible in this country to put her in a state fit for going to sea.

— Letter from W. Scott, E. H. Palmer and Thomas Moore to Governor King

Flinders left the now decommissioned Investigator as a storeship hulk at Port Jackson and attempted to return to England as a passenger aboard HMS Porpoise.

== Later years (1804–1810) ==
In 1804, Governor King of Sydney ordered a survey, which found that Investigator could be repaired and returned to service. The work involved cutting down the front deck and re-rigging the ship as a brig, to prepare her for another voyage. In 1804 she came under the command of Lieutenant John Houston for local service. While she was at Sydney, Investigator helped raise Lady Barlow, which had sunk at her moorings in a storm on 16 October 1804.

On 23 May 1805 Commander William Kent sailed Investigator back to England, carrying two of Flinders's botanists, Robert Brown and Ferdinand Bauer, and their collections. The ship endured several fierce storms en route but arrived safely at the Port of Liverpool.

In November 1805 Captain Kent was ordered to relocate Investigator to the Port of Plymouth. The voyage was a difficult one despite its brevity. A typhoid fever had come aboard while the ship was in port, incapacitating both lieutenants, the midshipman and one third of the crew. A further six crew members deserted in Liverpool before Investigator sailed. There was no ship's surgeon or medicine aboard, and Captain Kent observed that the provisions in Investigator's hold had long since turned "old and bad." (Note: Correspondence, Captain Kent to Admiralty Secretary William Marsden, 13 November 1805.)

Investigator was put to sea nonetheless, rounding the tip of Cornwall in heavy storms. A gale off The Lizard carried away most of her sails and rigging and part of the mainmast. Unwilling to risk further damage, Kent abandoned the voyage to Portsmouth and brought Investigator into Falmouth for repairs. Two of the crew died of disease before the ship was ready to return to sea. On 13 November, Kent wrote that a "more deplorable crazy vessel than the Investigator is perhaps not to be seen" in the Navy.

The battered and disease-ridden Investigator arrived in Plymouth harbour on 21 November, where she was declared unseaworthy. On 22 December her crew were paid off and transferred to other vessels. In January 1806 the ship herself was removed from active service and placed in ordinary. Two years later she was reclassified as a prison hulk. A decision was made to sell her for breaking up in 1810. One contemporaneous observer called her, a "noble, hard-working ship which did not deserve this fate". However, she was sold in December to a merchant, George Baily for £1,253, equivalent to £85,072 in 2025.

== Commercial service (1810–1872) ==
Now in private ownership, Investigator was rebuilt as a commercial sailing vessel, brig or snow rigged and reverted to her former naval name Xenophon. She continued to sail extensively around the globe.

The table below details information from Lloyd's Register for several years. In all cases, the data is for Xenophon, launched in 1795 in Sunderland. She first shows up in Lloyd's register in 1817, in which year there are two other Xenophons, both launched in Massachusetts, all of roughly similar sizes, but the American ones are much younger. In no subsequent year in the table below is there a second Xenophon listed.

Year	Master	Owner	Homeport	Trade	Notes
1817	W. Brass	R. Gardner		London – Bermuda; Liverpool – Quebec	
1820	G. Barber	R. Gardner		Bristol – Quebec	
1830	G. Barber	R. Gardner		London – Quebec	
1840	G. Tate	Dobinson	N. Shields	Shields – America; Bristol – Quebec	Large repair 1839
1850					Not listed in Lloyd's Register

Her final voyage occurred in 1853, when she put into the Australian port of Geelong on 30 July with a cargo of timber and other goods. Xenophon later continued on to Melbourne, where she was sold and was converted into a storage hulk. She was re-registered in Melbourne in 1861. A further change of ownership occurred in 1868 and the register was closed in 1872 with the comment "broken up".

== Sources ==
- Bladen, F. M., ed. (1979). Historical records of New South Wales. Vol. 5, King, 1803, 1804, 1805. Lansdown Slattery. ISBN 9780868330006.
- Braines, Helen; Edser, Harvey; Peters, Heather; Sims, Tarryn, eds. (2004a). "Essay: Flinders and the voyage of the 'Investigator', 1801-03". The Flinders papers. National Maritime Museum.
- Braines, Helen; Edser, Harvey; Peters, Heather; Sims, Tarryn, eds. (2004b). "Xenophon". The Flinders papers. National Maritime Museum.
- Braines, Helen; Edser, Harvey; Peters, Heather; Sims, Tarryn, eds. (2004c). "Investigator". The Flinders papers. National Maritime Museum.
- Flinders, Matthew (1814). A Voyage to Terra Australis: Undertaken for the Purpose of Completing the Discovery of that Vast Country, and Prosecuted in the Years 1801, 1802, and 1803, in His Majesty's Ship the Investigator. Vol. 1. London: G. Nicol & Son. Wikidata Q19027014.
- Flinders, Matthew (2004a) [1814]. Choat, Colin (ed.). A Voyage to Terra Australis: Undertaken for the Purpose of Completing the Discovery of that Vast Country, and Prosecuted in the Years 1801, 1802, and 1803, in His Majesty's Ship the Investigator. Vol. 1. Project Gutenberg (published 17 July 2004). Wikidata Q133873318.
- Flinders, Matthew (2004b) [1814]. Choat, Colin (ed.). A Voyage to Terra Australis: Undertaken for the Purpose of Completing the Discovery of that Vast Country, and Prosecuted in the Years 1801, 1802, and 1803, in His Majesty's Ship the Investigator. Vol. 2. Project Gutenberg (published 6 August 2004). Wikidata Q133873319.
- Winfield, Rif (2008). British Warships in the Age of Sail 1793–1817: Design, Construction, Careers and Fates. Seaforth. ISBN 978-1-86176-246-7.

== General references ==
- Colledge, J. J.; Warlow, Ben (2006) [1969]. Ships of the Royal Navy: The Complete Record of All Fighting Ships of the Royal Navy from the 15th Century to the Present (3rd Rev ed.). London: Chatham Publishing. ISBN 978-1-86176-281-8. OCLC 67375475.
- Morgan K., ed. (2015). Australia Circumnavigated – The Voyage of Matthew Flinders in HMS Investigator 1801–1803. Hakluyt Society. ISBN 9781908145116.
- Scott, Ernest, ed. (1914). The Life of Captain Matthew Flinders, R.N. . Sydney: Angus & Robertson – via Wikisource.
