= Jussieu Peninsula =

Jussieu Peninsula South Australia
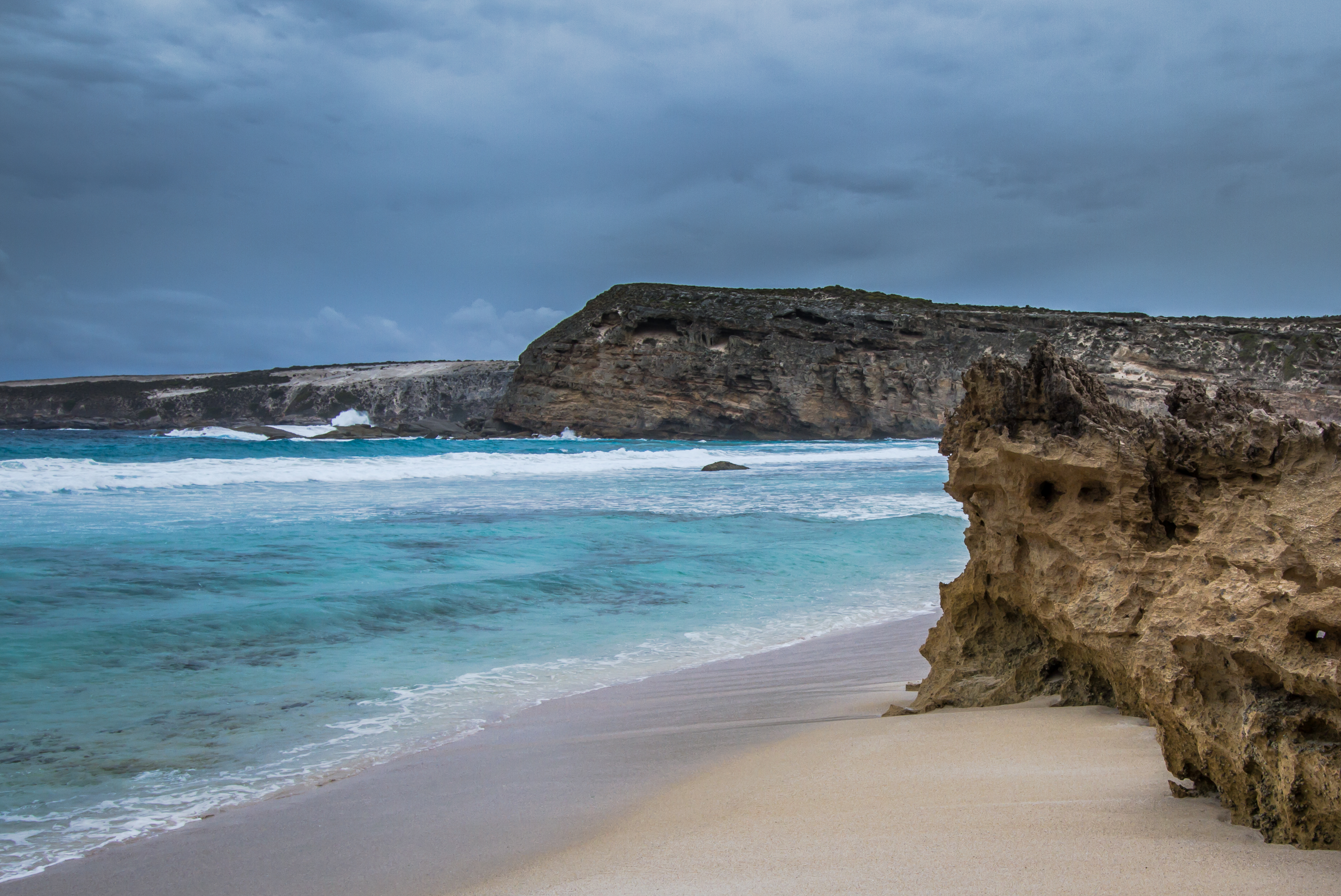
- Curta Rocks, South Australia

- Coordinates: 34°51′18″S 135°52′42″E
Mean max temp	Mean min temp	Annual rainfall
21.2 °C; 70 °F	11.3 °C; 52 °F	383.2 mm 15.1 in
- Footnotes: Climate

Jussieu Peninsula is a peninsula located at the south east end of Eyre Peninsula in South Australia. It is bounded by Proper Bay and Spalding Cove within the natural harbour known as Port Lincoln to the north, Spencer Gulf to the east and the Great Australian Bight to the south. While it was first explored and mapped by Matthew Flinders during February 1802, Flinders did not name it. In 1913, the name proposed by François Péron and Louis de Freycinet from Baudin's expedition when it visited later in 1802 was declared as the peninsula's official name by the Government of South Australia. Jussieu refers to the French botanist, Antoine Laurent de Jussieu. While parts of its surface have been cleared and used for agricultural purposes in the past, it is currently occupied by two protected areas: the Lincoln National Park and the Memory Cove Wilderness Protection Area.

== History ==
A shore-based bay whaling station is believed to have operated at Spalding Cove between 1829 and 1832.

== See also ==
- Cape Catastrophe
- Cape Donington
- Memory Cove
- Sleaford, South Australia
- Lincoln National Park, South Australia
