= James Linton =

James Linton may refer to:

- James Linton (bishop), Anglican bishop
- James Dromgole Linton, English artist
- James Linton (hacker), email prankster and social engineer
- J. W. R. Linton (James Walter Robert Linton, 1869–1947) West Australian artist and teacher
