= The Marriage of the Duke of Albany =

Painting by James Dromgole Linton

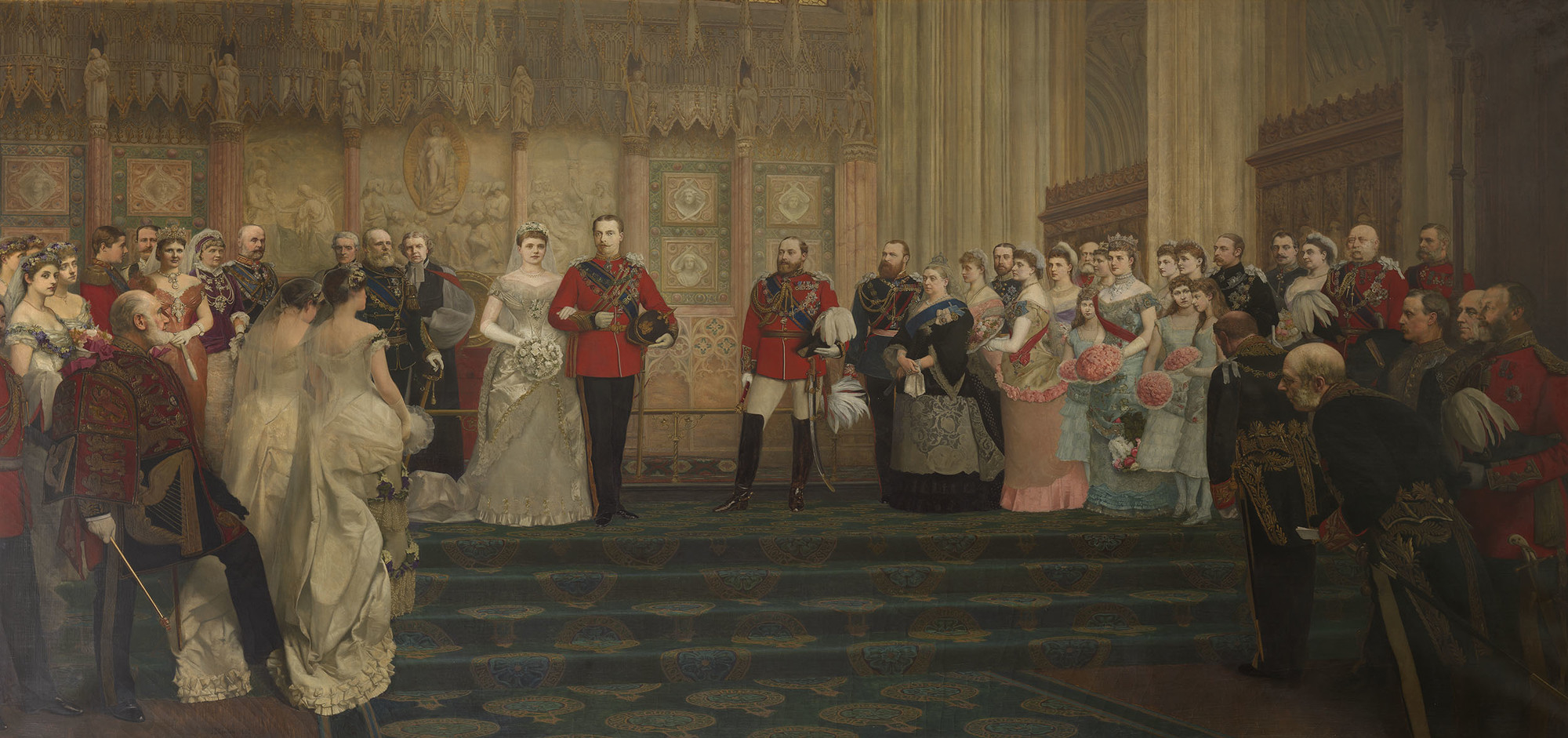
- Artist: James Dromgole Linton
- Year: 1885
- Type: Oil on canvas, historical painting
- Dimensions: 102.9 cm × 193.0 cm (40.5 in × 76.0 in)
- Location: Royal Collection

The Marriage of the Duke of Albany is an oil on canvas history painting by the English artist James Dromgole Linton, from 1885.

== History and description ==
It depicts the wedding of Prince Leopold, Duke of Albany and Princess Helen of Waldeck and Pyrmont in St George's Chapel, Windsor Castle, on 27 April 1882.

Leopold was the fourth son of Queen Victoria and Prince Albert. Helen was a daughter of George Victor, Prince of Waldeck and Pyrmont and Princess Helena of Nassau. It was Queen Victoria who suggested Helen, daughter of a reigning Protestant family, as a bride for Leopold.

The painting was commissioned by Queen Victoria and shows the couple after their marriage service at the altar. Linton was chosen as the artist at the suggestion of Sir Frederick Leighton. Queen Victoria, the Prince of Wales and Princess Beatrice stand to the groom's left. For the ceremony Victoria wore her wedding lace over black satin and her own wedding veil, which she had worn 42 years earlier. Linton's progress on finishing the painting was slow and Leopold died in 1884 of a cerebral haemorrhage. It was eventually exhibited at the Royal Academy Summer Exhibition in 1885.
