= Gambier Islands Group Marine Park =

Protected area in South Australia

- IUCN category IV (habitat/species management area)
- Location within South Australia
- Location: South Australia
- Nearest city: Port Lincoln
- Coordinates: 35°10′00″S 136°27′50″E
- Area: 120 km^{2} (46 sq mi)
- Established: 29 January 2009
- Governing body: Department for Environment and Water
- Website: Official website

Gambier Islands Group Marine Park is a marine protected area in the Australian state of South Australia located in state coastal waters around the Gambier Islands at the mouth of Spencer Gulf.

The marine park was established on 29 January 2009 by proclamation under the Marine Parks Act 2007.

The Gambier Islands Group Marine Park consists of the waters around all parts of the island group to a distance of 1.6 nautical miles (3.0 km; 1.8 mi) from ‘median high water’ and overlaps both the crown land on the south-west side of Wedge Island and the Gambier Islands Conservation Park which includes the islands known as North Island, East Peaked Rocks, West Peak Rocks and South West Rock.

While the Marine Parks Act 2007 has provision for a marine park to be divided into a number of zone to ensure varying degrees of “protection for habitats and biodiversity” and varying levels of “ecologically sustainable development and use”, the whole extent of the Gambier Islands Group Marine Park has been placed in one zone, being “habitat protection” where “activities and uses that do not harm habitats or the functioning of ecosystems” are only permitted.

As of 2016, the marine park was classified as IUCN Category IV protected area.

== See also ==
- Protected areas of South Australia
