= Gambier Islands Conservation Park =

Protected area in South Australia

- IUCN category Ia (strict nature reserve)
- Location within South Australia
- Location: South Australia
- Nearest city: Port Lincoln.
- Coordinates: 35°9′20″S 136°27′52″E
- Area: 100 ha (250 acres)
- Established: 16 March 1967
- Governing body: Department for Environment and Water

Gambier Islands Conservation Park is a protected area associated with the Gambier Islands Group, which is located in the middle of the mouth of Spencer Gulf in South Australia about 71 kilometres (44 miles) south east of Port Lincoln. The conservation park consists of the following islands from within the group - North Island, South West Rock and Peaked Rocks. Wedge Island is not included in the conservation park. The land which now comprises the conservation park was previously declared as Fauna Reserves in March 1967 under the Fauna Conservation Act 1964 and was re-proclaimed in 1972 under the National Parks and Wildlife Act 1972. The area under protection is considered significant for the following reasons: "a group of small islands utilised by seabirds and the Australian sea lion" and the "north island supports a population of the southern bush rat (Rattus fuscipes)". The conservation park is classified as an IUCN Category Ia protected area.

The national park is teeming with spruce trees and its tree trunks are prey to the honey fungus that weakens them. Predators of trees weakened by the honey fungus include bark beetles and other wood boring insects. These in turn provide a rich source of food for birds. This is the case for the three-toed woodpecker. In addition, there is a flowering season, which starts in March.

Liverworts and wood anemones are easily distinguishable a few years later. Moreover, this time of the year marks the arrival of many migratory birds. Among these are the hawk falcons, robins and song thrushes. May is mainly marked by the presence of songbirds such as the wood warbler and the black skullcap.

== See also ==
- Protected areas of South Australia
- Gambier Islands Group Marine Park
