= St Mark's, Hamilton Terrace =

Church in St John's Wood, London

Coordinates: 51°31′56″N 0°10′56″W

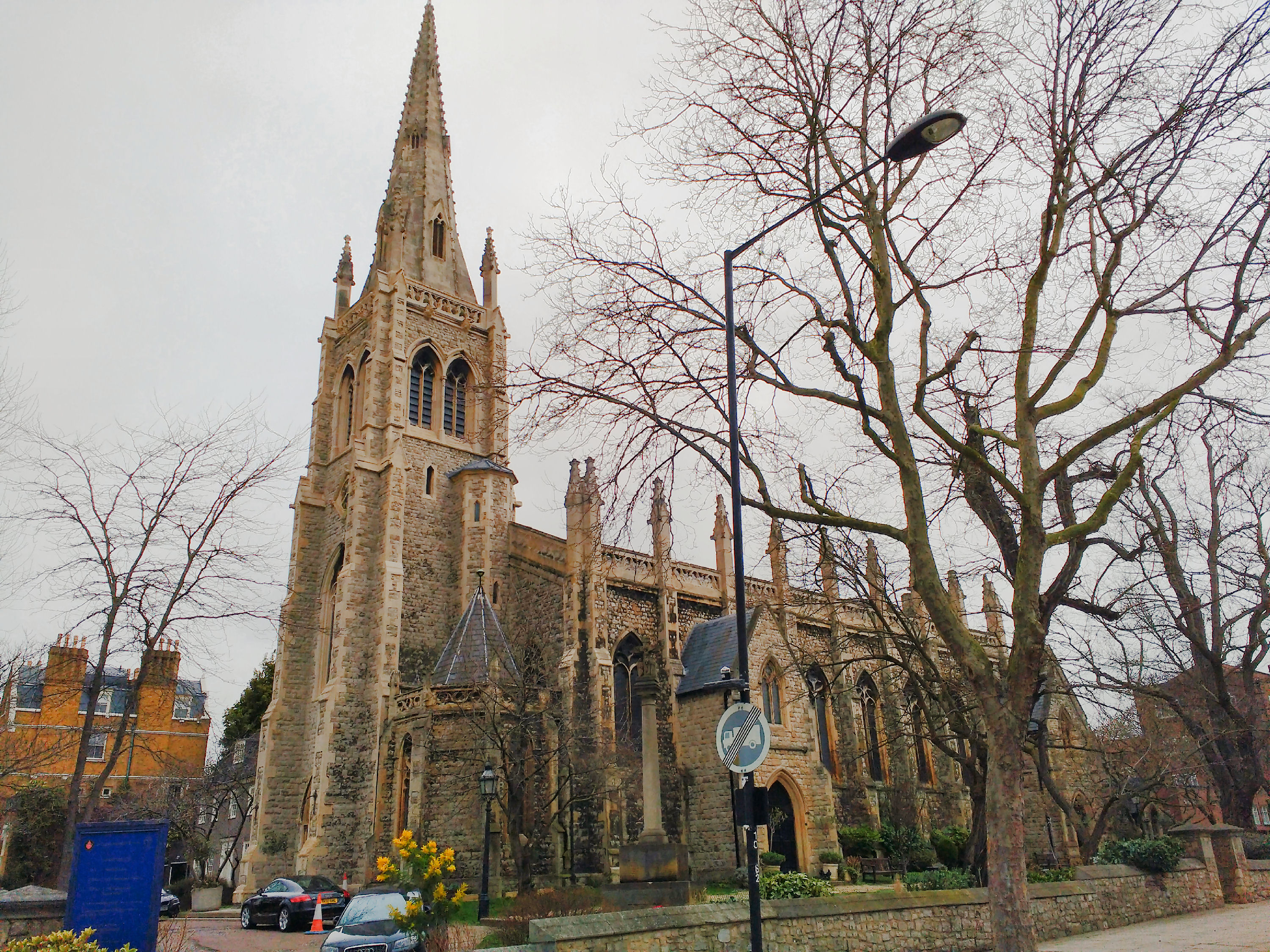
St Mark's, Hamilton Terrace viewed from the southwest in 2017

St Mark's Church, Hamilton Terrace, is an Anglican church in the St John's Wood neighbourhood of the City of Westminster, London. The building was completed by 1847 and was badly damaged in an unexplained fire on 26 January 2023. It is located at the intersection of Abercorn Place and Hamilton Terrace.

== History ==
Dating to 1846–1847, St Mark's was designed by Thomas Cundy with a spire built by his son in 1864, and is Grade II* listed with Historic England. The church contained a collection of mosaics by Salviati.

Robinson Duckworth was appointed vicar of St Mark's in 1870, after spending four years as the tutor of Queen Victoria's youngest son Prince Leopold. The Prince laid the building's foundation stone in 1877.

St Mark's survived being hit by a bomb in 1941 during World War Two, with work to rebuild its spire being completed in 1955.

The church has been part of the Affirming Catholicism movement within the Church of England, and their main Sunday service included a Choral Parish Eucharist.

=== 2023 fire ===
The church was badly damaged by an unexplained fire during the late night and early morning of 26–27 January 2023. BBC News described the church as "destroyed", noting that the roof had collapsed but the steeple (rebuilt in 1955) was still standing. The vicar, the Reverend Kate Harrison, said that the fire was "heart-breaking for us as a church and a local community". The London Fire Brigade carried out investigations into the cause of the fire. On 27 January 2023, the parish stated that "we don't yet know the full extent of the damage, but we will rebuild."

== Gallery ==
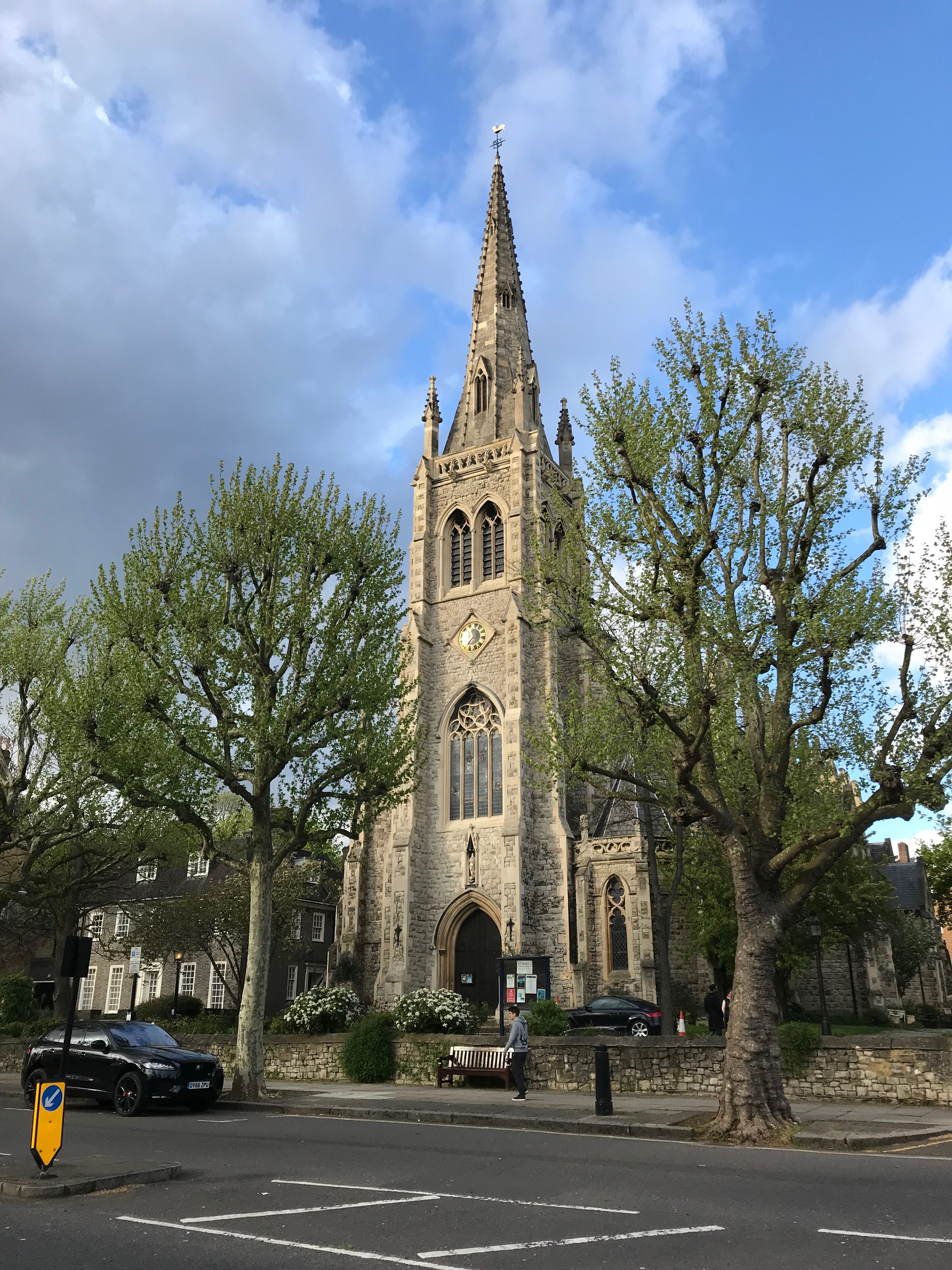
St Mark's

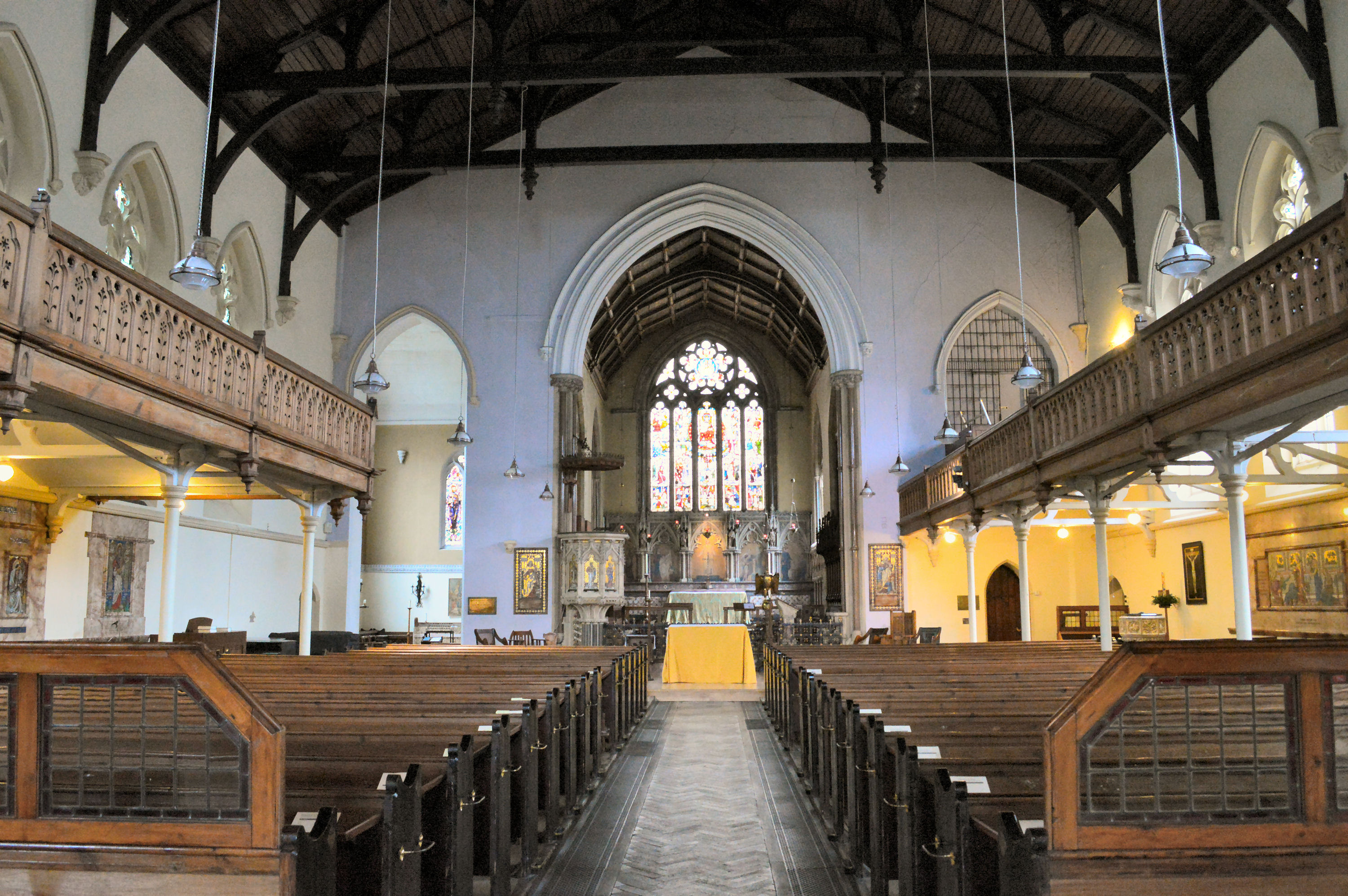
Nave

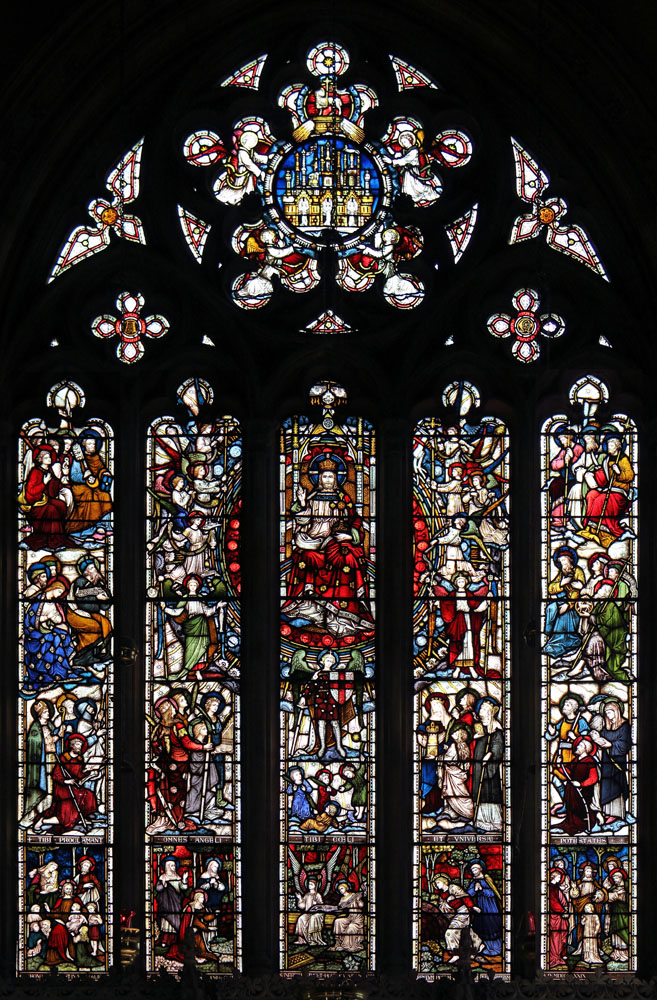
East window

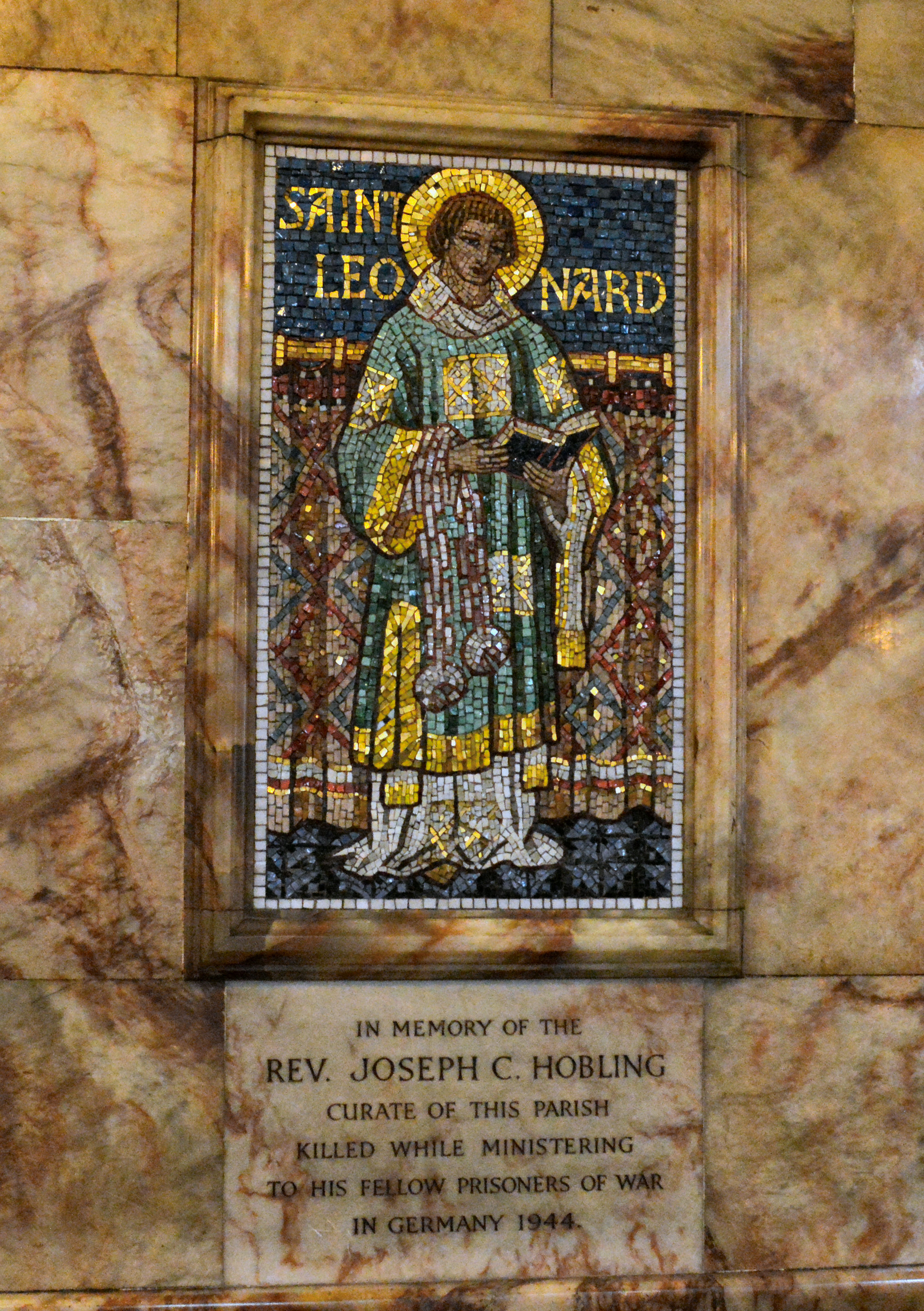
Hobling mosaic

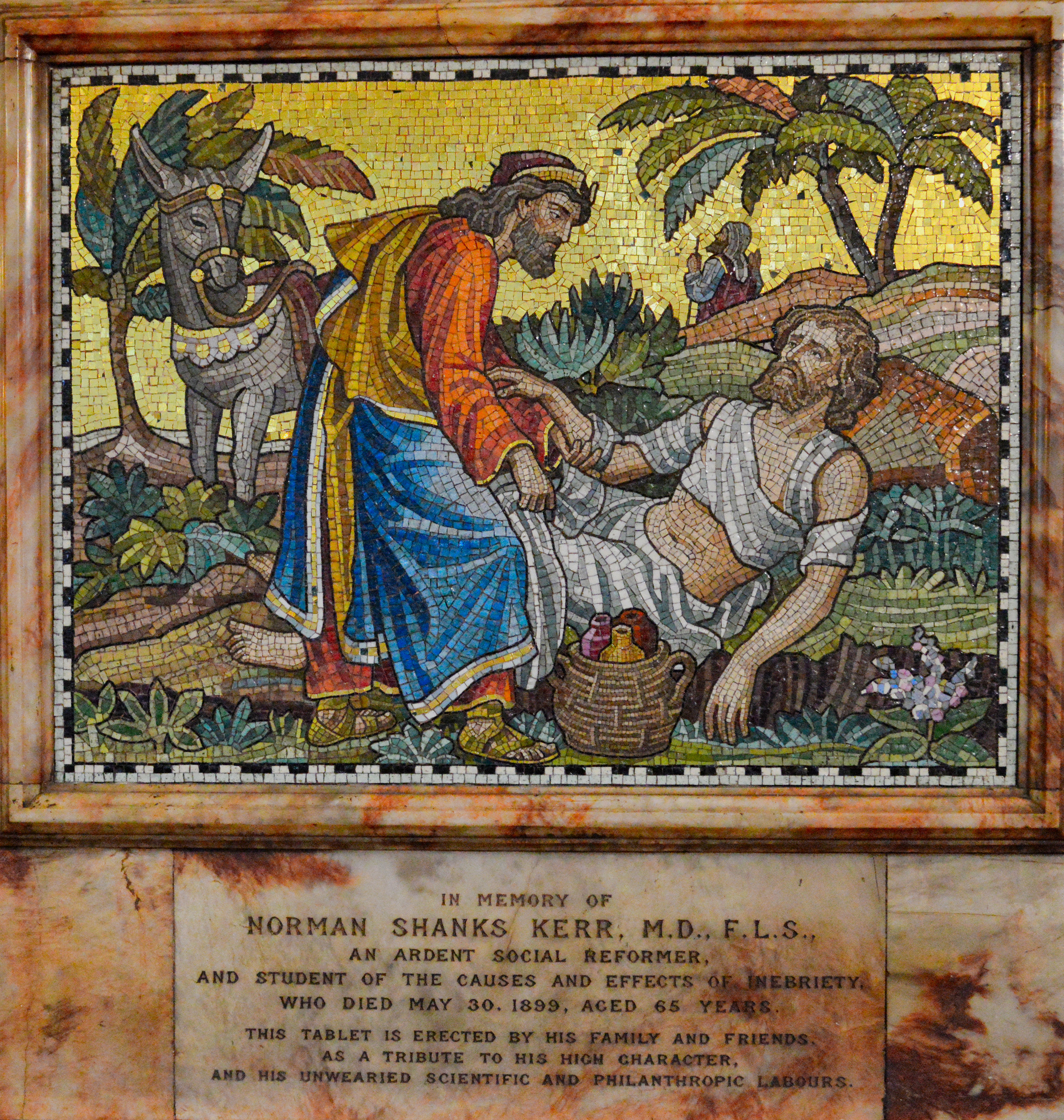
Norman Kerr mosaic

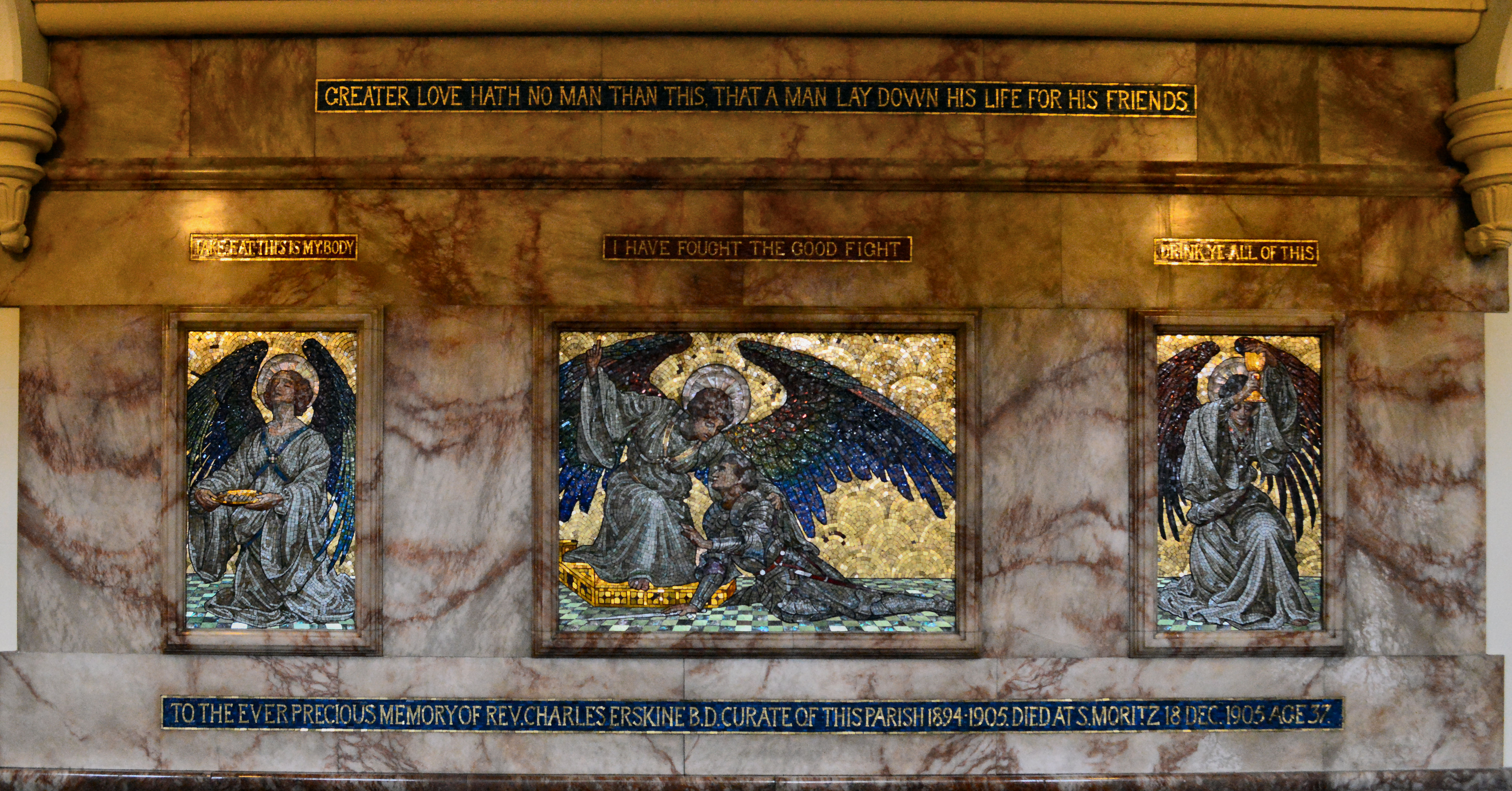
Erskine memorial mosaic

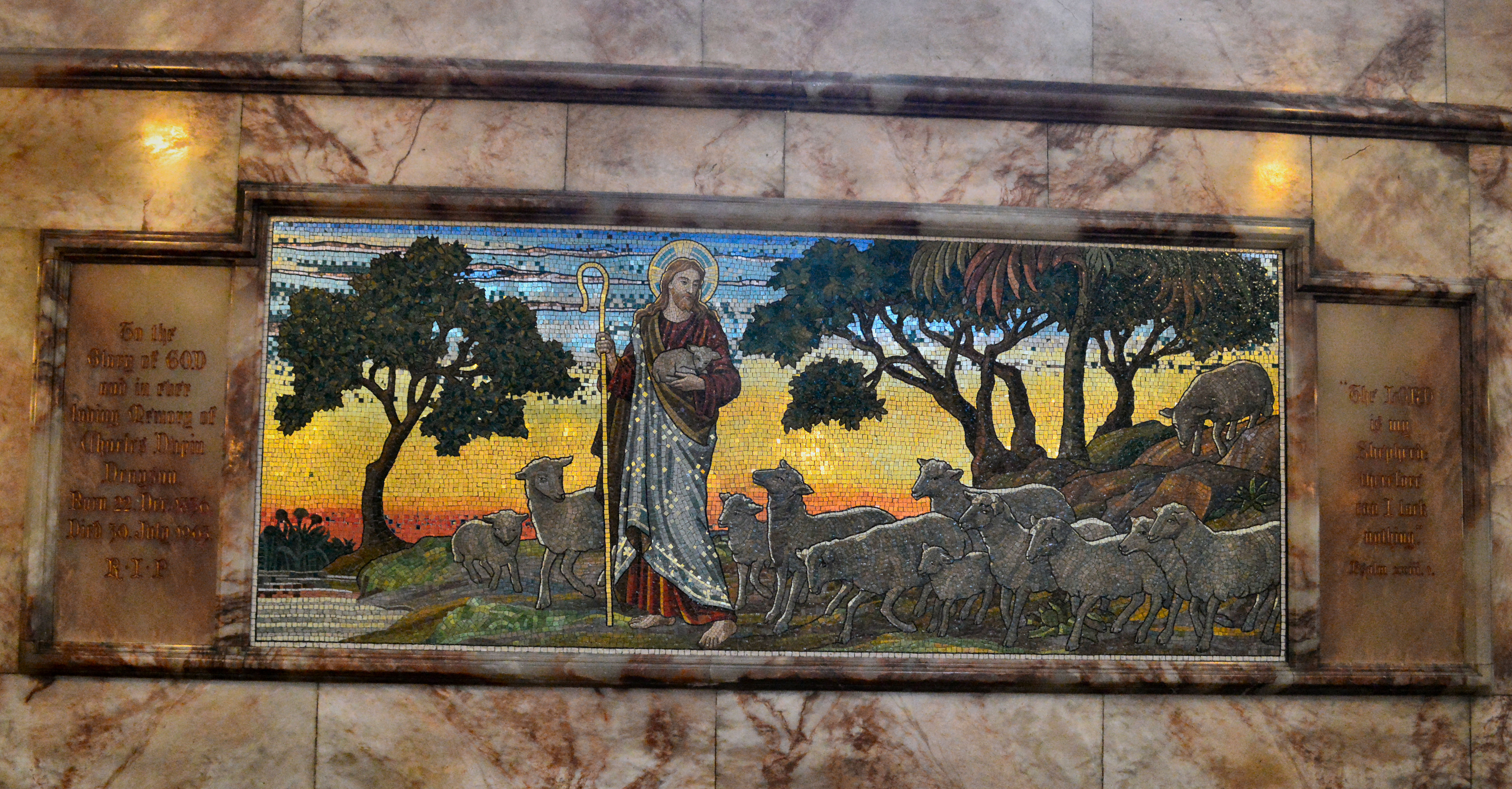
Charles Drayson mosaic

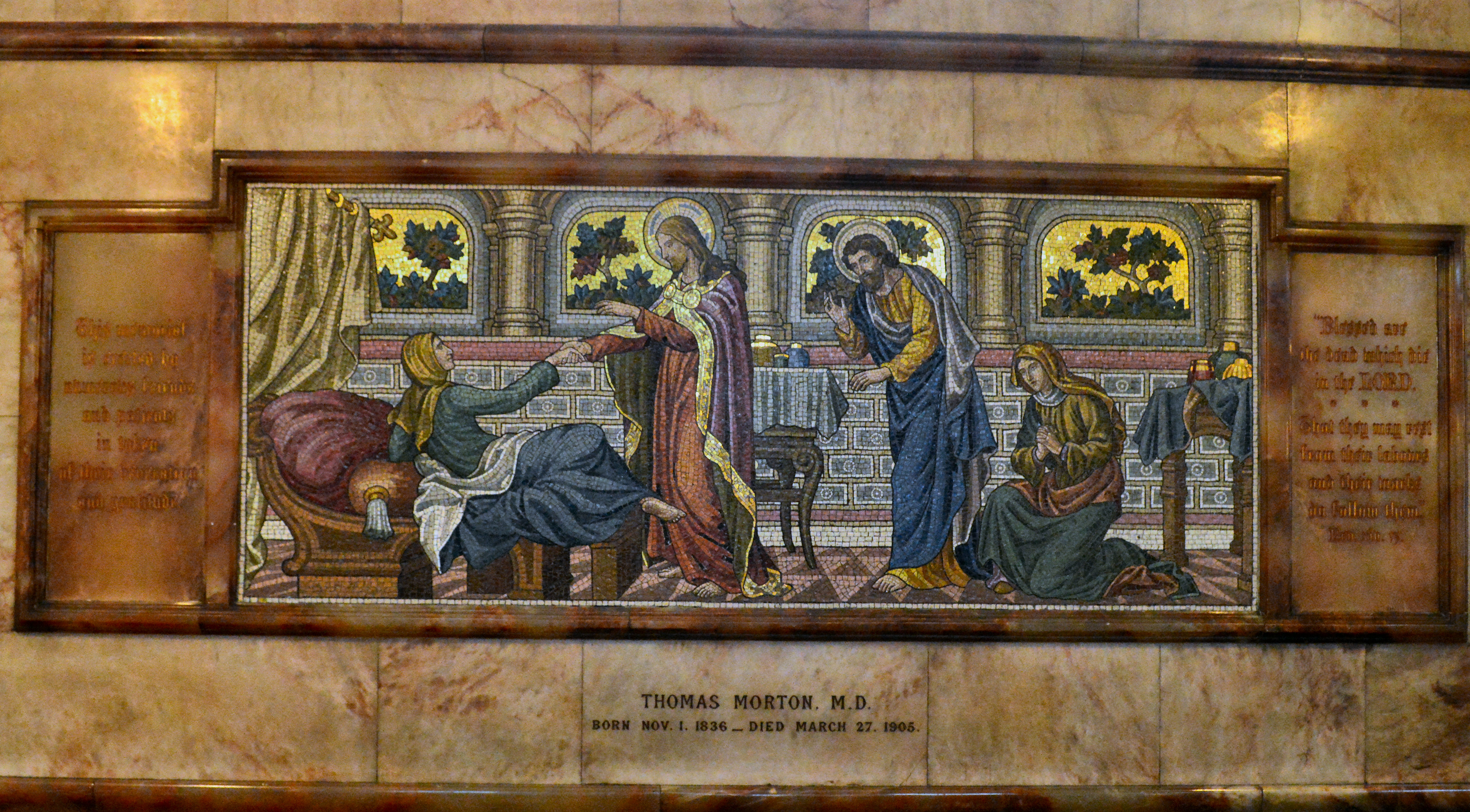
Thomas Morton mosaic
