= Hamilton Terrace =

Street in St John's Wood, London

Coordinates: 51°31′54.42″N 0°10′58.15″W

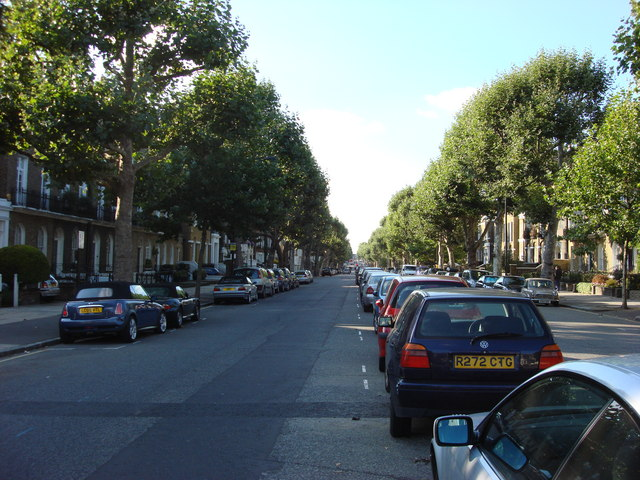
A view looking along Hamilton Terrace in 2007

Hamilton Terrace is a wide, tree-lined residential thoroughfare in St John's Wood, London, England. It runs north to south from Carlton Hill to St. John's Wood Road, and is parallel to Maida Vale to the west.

The street was named after Charles Hamilton, a Harrow School governor.

The street is home to a variety of grand detached and semi-detached houses and mansion blocks. The listed Anglican church St Mark's, Hamilton Terrace is located at the intersection of Abercorn Place and Hamilton Terrace.

== Notable residents ==
- No.3 Michael Ayrton, English artist, lived at No. 3
- No.8 Norman Kerr, physician remembered for his work in the British temperance movement, lived at No. 8 (formerly No. 1)
- No.10 Henry Barnett, banker and politician, lived at No. 10. Sir Charles Mackerras, conductor and musicologist, lived at No. 10.
- No.14 Philip Jones, English jazz trumpeter, lived at No. 14
- No.17 Sir Joseph Bazalgette, English civil engineer, designer of the Victoria Embankment, lived at No. 17
- No.20 Sir George Alexander Macfarren, English composer, and Natalia Macfarren lived at No. 20
- No.20 William McMillan, Scottish sculptor, lived at No. 20
- No.20 William Strang, Scottish artist, lived at No. 20
- No.29 Nicholas Trübner, publisher, bookseller and linguist, lived at No. 29
- No.29 Joseph Octave Delepierre, Belgian lawyer, archivist, diplomat, author and antiquary, died at No.29.
- No.37 John Minton, and Keith Vaughan, English artists, shared a flat at No. 37
- No.40 Honor Blackman, English actress
- No.40 Kathleen Ferrier, English singer
- No.63 Sir Arthur Wing Pinero, English dramatist, actor and theatre manager, lived at No. 63
- No.65 Alan Wheatley, English actor, lived at No. 65
- No.70 Thomas Hardy, English novelist, author of Far from the Madding Crowd, rented No.70, in 1893
- No.85 Jonathan Sacks, English rabbi, Chief Rabbi in Britain from 1991 to 2013, philosopher, theologian, and author, lived at No. 85
- No.93 Gerald Finzi, English composer, was born at No. 93
- No.98 Brian Johnston, English cricket commentator and journalist, lived at No. 98
- No 100 Henry Barnett, banker and politician, was the original owner. Robbie Williams temporarily rented it before the debut of his 2019 Christmas album song, "Idlewild".
- No.103 Joseph Hertz, Hungarian rabbi, Chief Rabbi in Britain from 1913 to 1946, lived at No. 103
- No.135 Audrey Fildes, English actress, lived at No. 135
- Henry Stacy Marks, English painter
- Gerald Moore, English classical pianist
