= Nicholas Trübner =

German-English publisher and linguist (1817–1884)

- Nikolaus Trübner
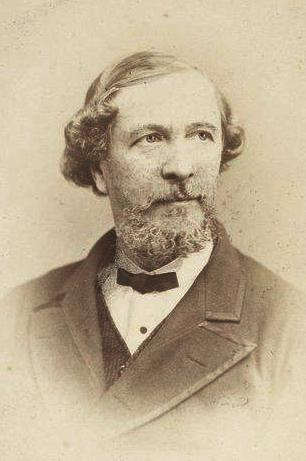
- Born: Nikolaus Trübner; 17 June 1817; Heidelberg, Kingdom of Württemberg
- Died: 20 March 1884 (aged 66); Maida Vale, London, England
- Resting place: Highgate Cemetery, London
- Occupations: Publisher; bookseller; linguist
- Era: 1831–1884
- Known for: Founding Trübner & Co.
- Notable work: Trübner's Oriental Series; Bibliographical Guide to American Literature
- Spouse: Daughter of Joseph Octave Delepierre
- Children: 1

Nicholas Trübner (born Nikolaus Trübner; 17 June 1817 – 20 March 1884), was a German-English publisher, bookseller and linguist.

== Early life ==
The eldest of four sons of a goldsmith in Heidelberg, Trübner was born there on 17 June 1817, and educated at the gymnasium. When he was born Heidelberg was part of the Kingdom of Württemberg. He was studious, and his parents placed him in 1831 in the shop of Mohr, a Heidelberg bookseller. He was there for six years, and then had successive employment with Vandenhoeck & Ruprecht at Göttingen, Hoffmann und Campe at Hamburg, and Wilmann at Frankfurt.

== In London ==
At Frankfurt William Longman (1813–1877) offered Trübner the post of foreign corresponding clerk in his own business, and Trübner came to London in 1843. In 1851 he entered into partnership with Thomas Delf, who had succeeded to Wiley & Putnam's American literary agency, but at first the venture failed. David Nutt joined him, the business was put on a sounder footing, and the American trade developed.

In 1855 he published his Bibliographical Guide to American Literature which he expanded four years later to five times its original size.

Trübner visited the United States and formed business connections with leading American writers and publishers.

As a bookseller Trübner imported books from publishers in the United States, India and many other countries, and sold and exported books to bookshops and individual customers around the world.

== Scholarly publisher ==
In London, Trübner took on the ordinary business of a general publisher and foreign agent. Among the books he published was Erewhon (1872) by Samuel Butler, after Chapman & Hall had rejected it.

Trübner studied Sanskrit under Theodor Goldstücker and Hebrew with Abraham Benisch. On 16 March 1865 appeared the first monthly number of Trübner's American and Oriental Record, which kept scholars in touch internationally. In 1878 began the issue of Trübner's Oriental Series, a collection of works by authorities on Eastern learning, of which he lived to see nearly fifty volumes published. His English and Foreign Philosophical Library. This series is listed incorrectly in Stanley Lane-Poole's entry in the Dictionary of National Biography (1885–1900) as "British and Foreign Philosophical Library". It fulfilled a similar purpose for philosophy. His interest in linguistic research led to his preparing in 1872 a Catalogue of Dictionaries and Grammars of the principal Languages and Dialects of the World, of which an enlarged edition appeared in 1882. He also published class catalogues of languages and branches of study. He was publisher for government state papers and for learned societies, such as the Royal Asiatic Society and the Early English Text Society.

Trübner's Record is the general name for a regular publication listing recently titles. It began in 1865 as Trübner's American and Oriental Literary Record. In 1880 a new, expanded series was launched: Trübner's American, European, and Oriental Literary Record. A third series was started in 1889, titled simply Trübner's Record. It ceased publication in 1891.

Trübner's Oriental Series was a hardback series of books in the field of Oriental studies launched in 1878 by Nicholas Trübner's firm Trübner & Co. in 1878. From 1890 it was published by Kegan Paul, Trench, Trübner & Co., Ltd.

== Later life ==
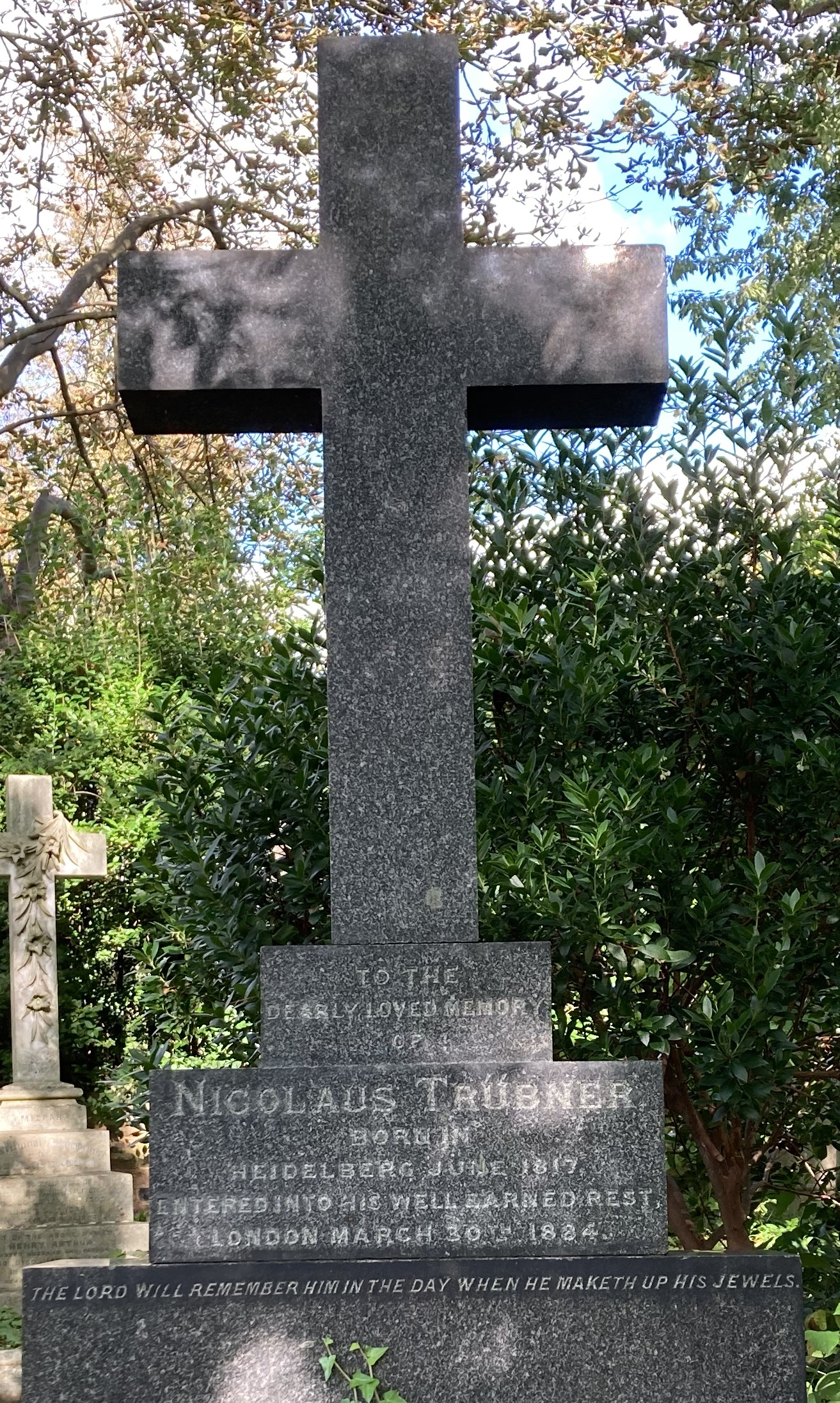
Grave of Nicholas Trübner in Highgate Cemetery

Trübner associated with Douglas Jerrold, G. H. Lewes, Hepworth Dixon, W. R. Greg, John Doran, and Bret Harte. His services to learning were recognised by foreign rulers, who bestowed on him the orders of the Crown of Prussia, Ernestine Branch of Saxony, Francis Joseph of Austria, St. Olaf of Norway, the Lion of Zähringen, and the White Elephant of Siam.

He died at his residence, 29 Upper Hamilton Terrace, Maida Vale, on 30 March 1884, leaving one daughter. He was buried on the eastern side of Highgate Cemetery.

== Works ==
His own works include, besides the catalogues and bibliographies already mentioned, translations from Flemish of Hendrik Conscience's Sketches of Flemish Life, 1846, from German of part of Brunnhofer's Life of Giordano Bruno, Scheffel's Die Schweden in Rippoldsau, and Eckstein's Eternal Laws of Morality; and a memoir of Joseph Octave Delepierre, Belgian consul in London, whose daughter he married. He also collected materials for a history of classical book selling. In 1857 he edited and expanded his friend Hermann Ludewig's manuscript work The Literature of American Aboriginal Languages.
