= Abercorn Place =

Street in London

Coordinates: 51.53205°N 0.18161°W

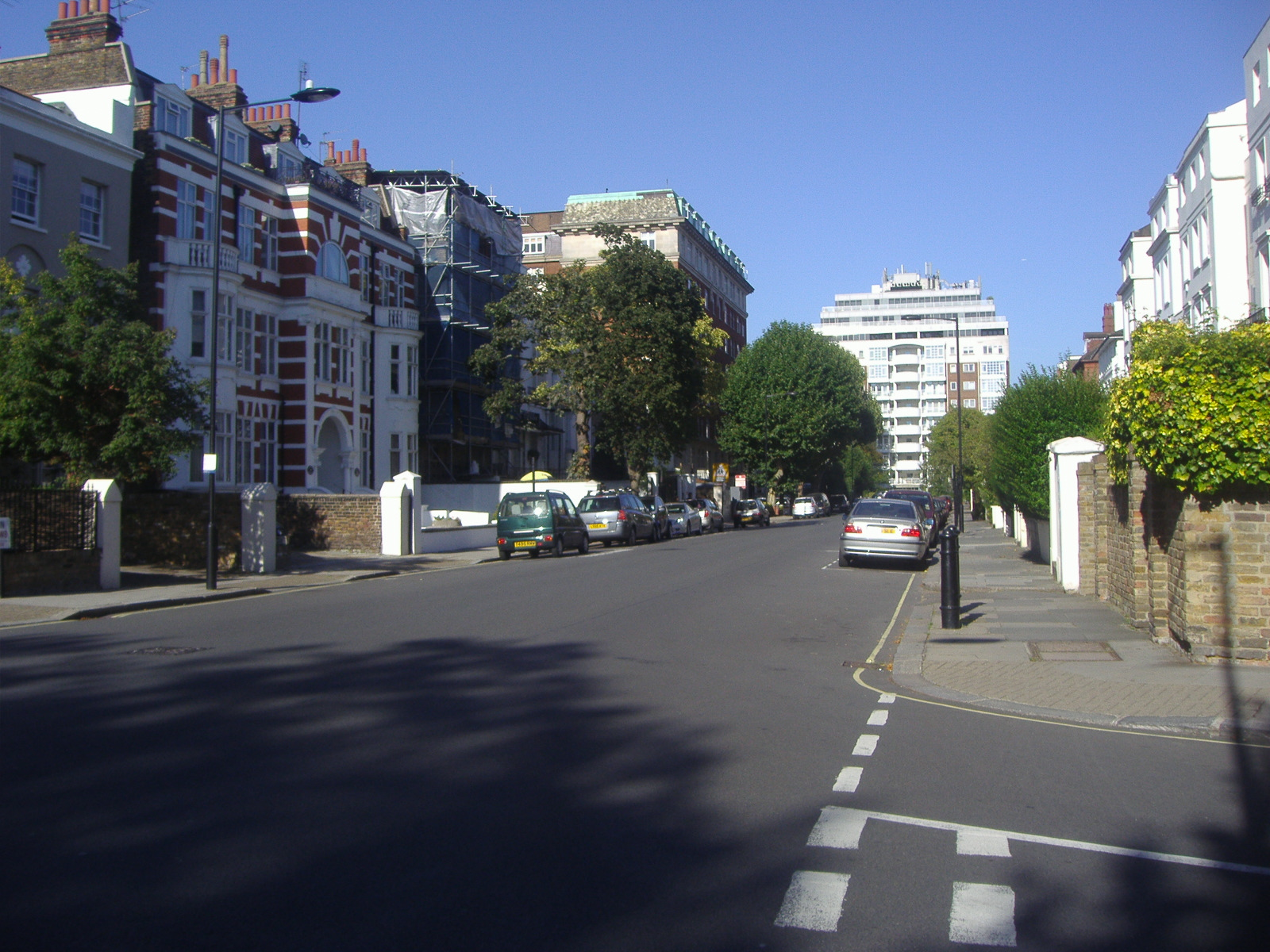
Looking east towards Abbey Road.

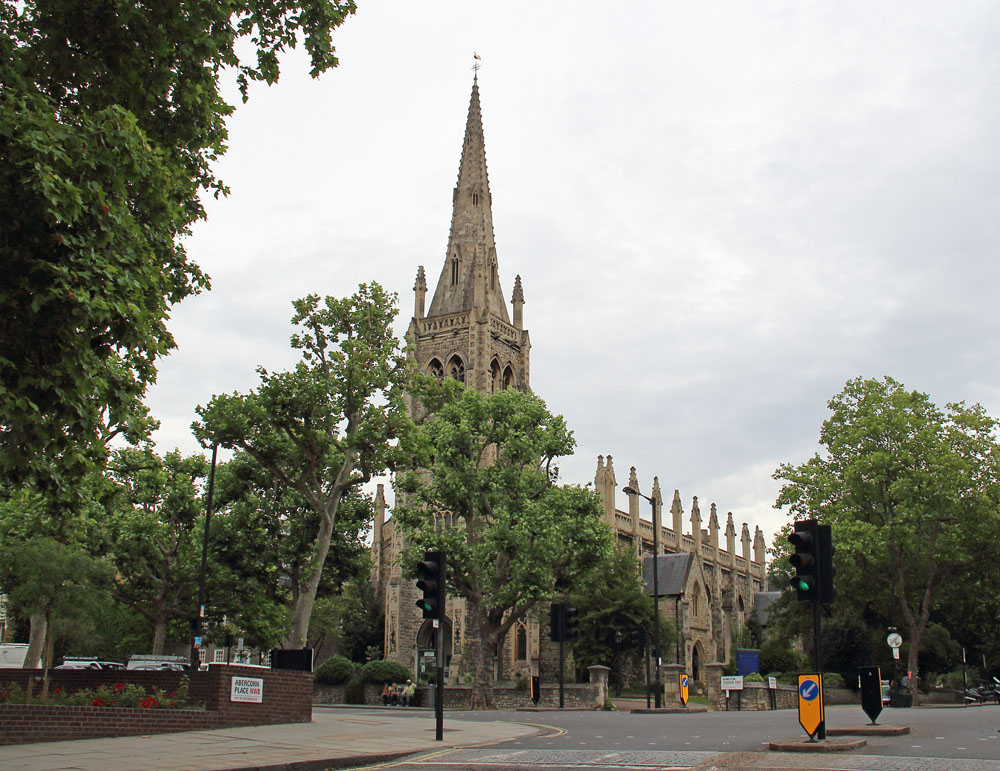
St Mark's Church seen from Abercorn Place.

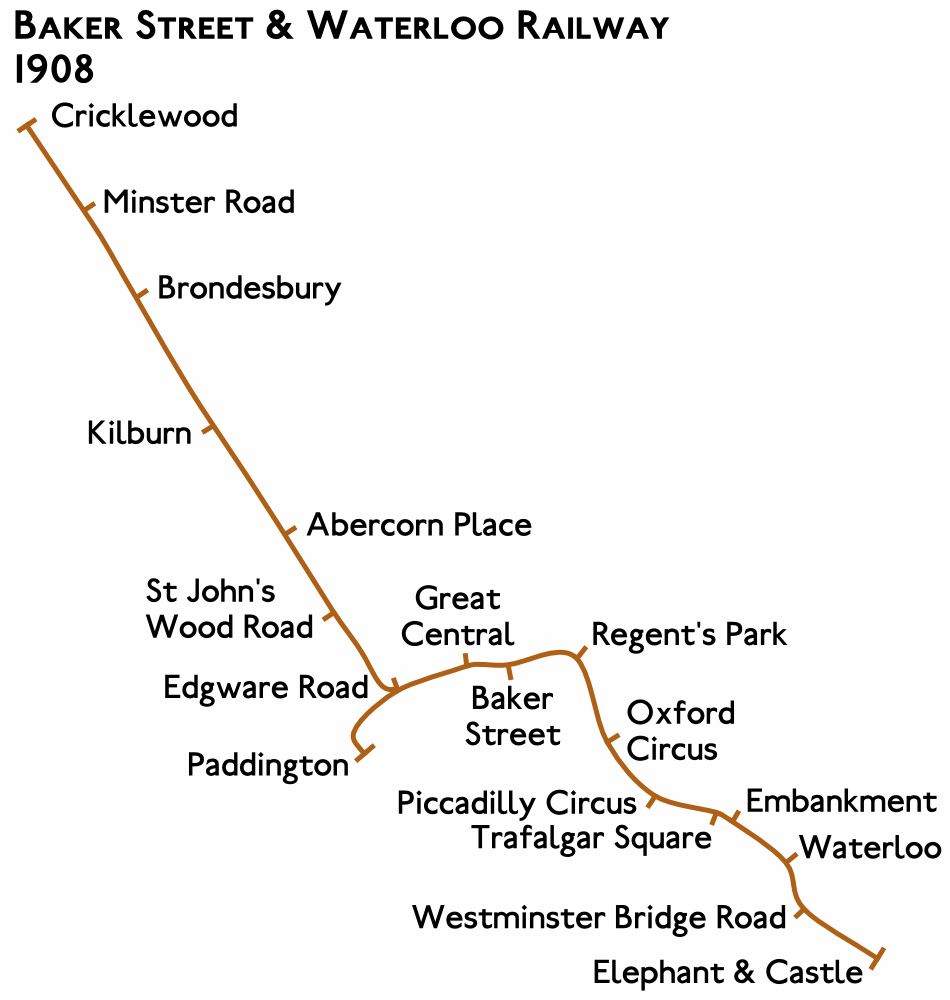
Aberborn Place on a map of a proposed 1908 extension to the Bakerloo Line.

Abercorn Place is a street in St John's Wood in London. Located in the City of Westminster, it runs west to east from the Edgware Road at Maida Vale until it joins Abbey Road not far from the Abbey Road Studios to the south. It is crossed by Hamilton Terrace. The street is named after the Duke of Abercorn, an Anglo-Irish aristocrat. It was part of an estate originally owned by Harrow School of which Abercorn was a governor with other nearby streets similarly named. The street contains a mixture of housing from the 1820s onwards. Several buildings in the street are listed today. The Anglican St Mark's Church was built in 1847 at the intersection with Hamilton Terrace. It was designed in the Gothic style by the architect Thomas Cundy.

In 1908 a proposed extension of the Bakerloo Line would have seen a station called Abercorn Place built at the junction with Edgware Road, but this was rejected. When the line was extended in 1915, on a different route, the station was placed a little to the west on Elgin Avenue and renamed Maida Vale.

Residents of the street have included the artist Charles Robert Leslie, the writer Christopher Sclater Millard and the actress Ingeborg von Kusserow.

== Bibliography ==
- Badsey-Ellis, Antony. London's Lost Tube Schemes. Capital Transport, 2005.
- Bebbington, Gillian. London Street Names. Batsford, 1972.
- Cockburn, J. S., King, H. P. F. & McDonnell, K. G. T. & A History of the County of Middlesex. Institute of Historical Research, 1989.
- Cherry, Bridget & Pevsner, Nikolaus. London 3: North West. Yale University Press, 2002.
- Hibbert, Christopher Weinreb, Ben, Keay, John & Keay, Julia. The London Encyclopaedia. Pan Macmillan, 2011.
- Summerson, John. Georgian London. Barrie & Jenkins, 1970.
- Walford, Edward. Old and New London: a Narrative of Its History, Its People, and Its Places: The western and northern suburbs. Cassell, 1892.
