= Wedge Island Lighthouse =

Lighthouse in South Australia

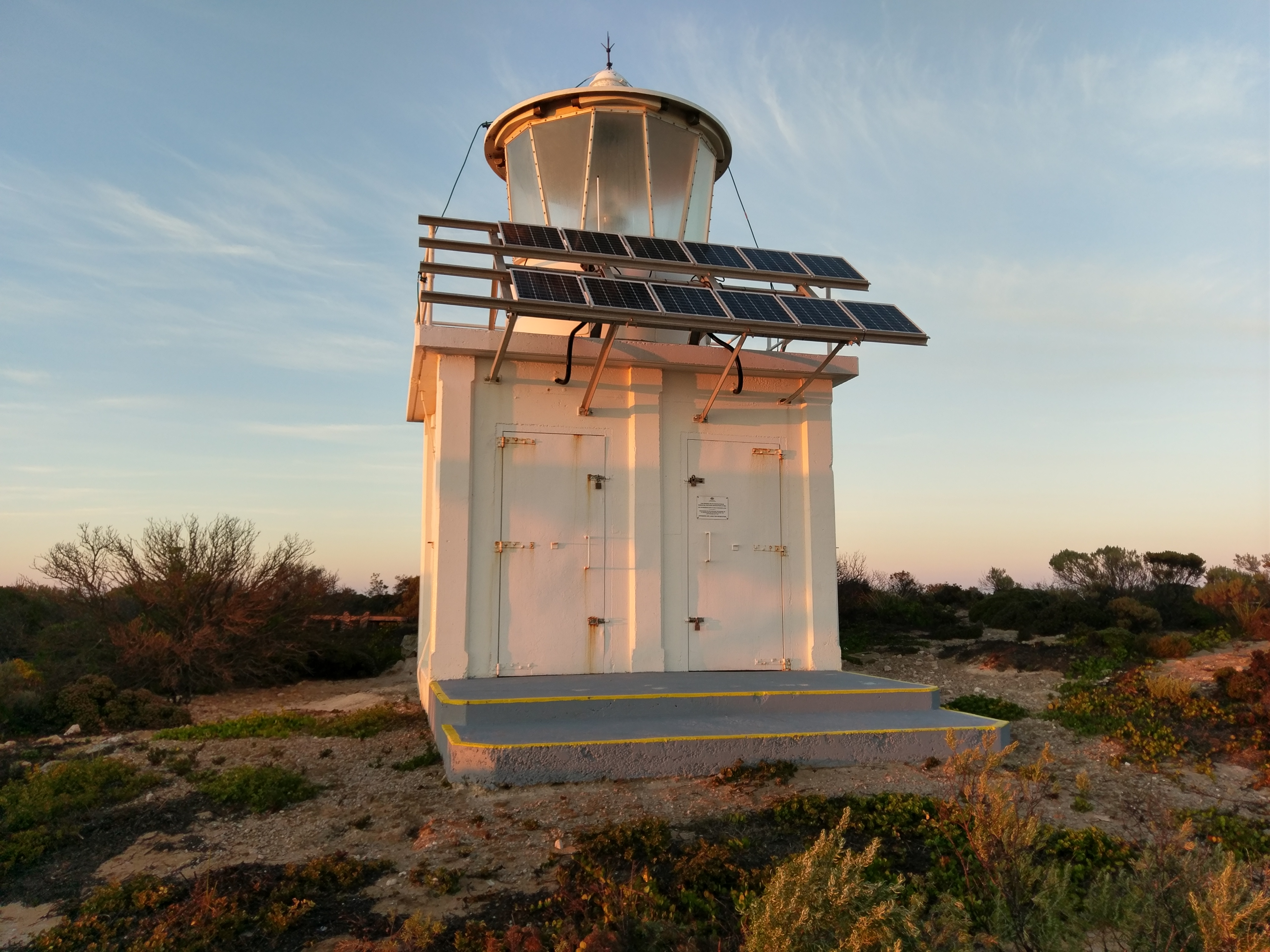
- Location: Spencer Gulf; South Australia; Australia
- Coordinates: 35°10.6′S 136°29.3′E

Tower
- Constructed: 1911 (first)
- Construction: concrete tower
- Height: 5 metres (16 ft)
- Shape: square tower with balcony and lantern
- Markings: white tower
- Operator: Australian Maritime Safety Authority

Light
- First lit: 1970 (current)
- Focal height: 207 metres (679 ft)
- Lens: 250 mm
- Range: 17 nautical miles (31 km; 20 mi)
- Characteristic: F l(2) W 15s.

Wedge Island Lighthouse is a lighthouse in the Australian state of South Australia located on Wedge Island at the entrance to Spencer Gulf.

It was first lit on 29 March 1911 and rebuilt in 1970 and is located on the highest point of the island. During the Second World War the RAAF operated No. 7 radar station at the lighthouse site, with a staff of about 30. This station was disbanded in November 1945.

== See also ==
- List of lighthouses in Australia

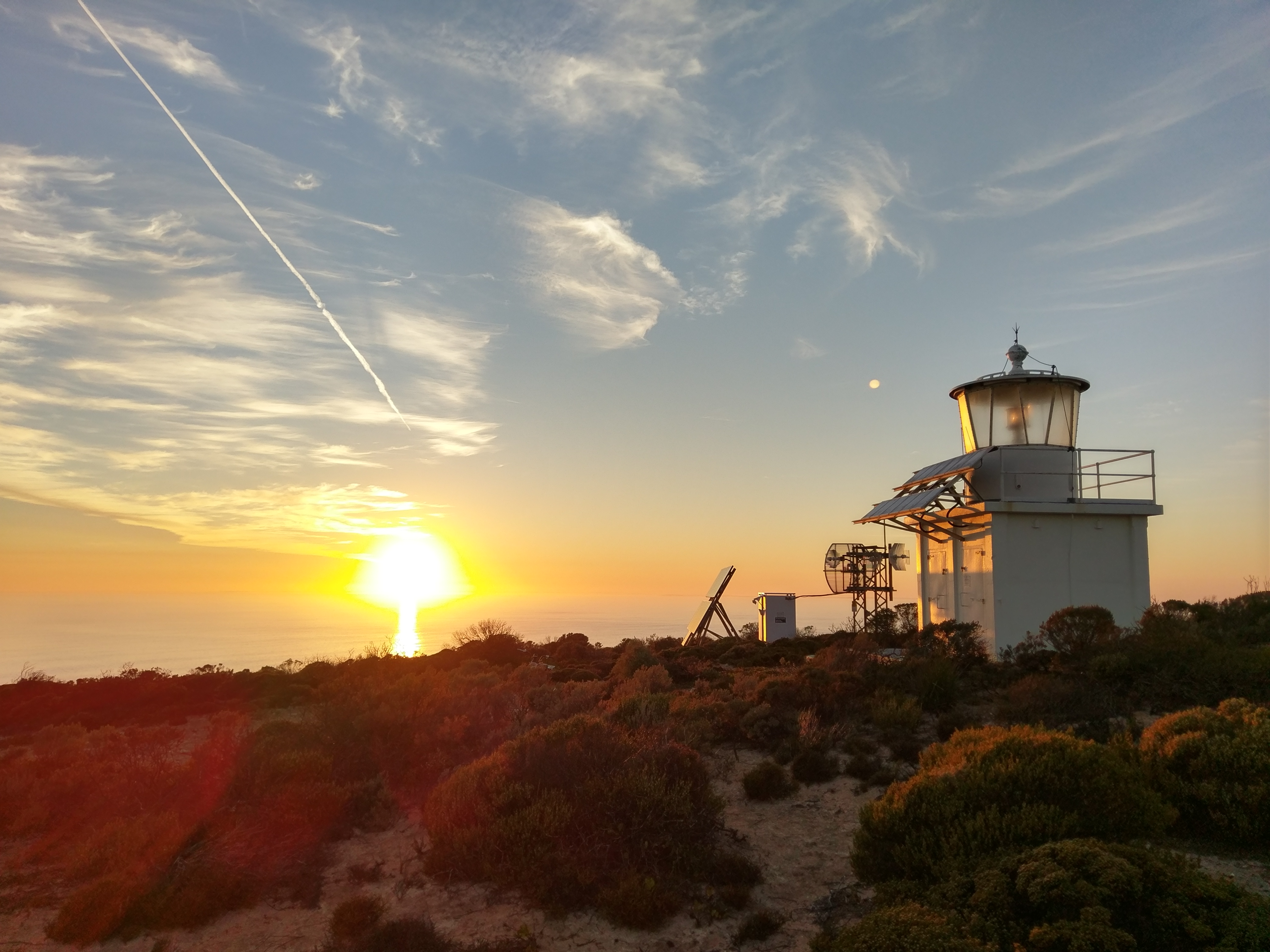

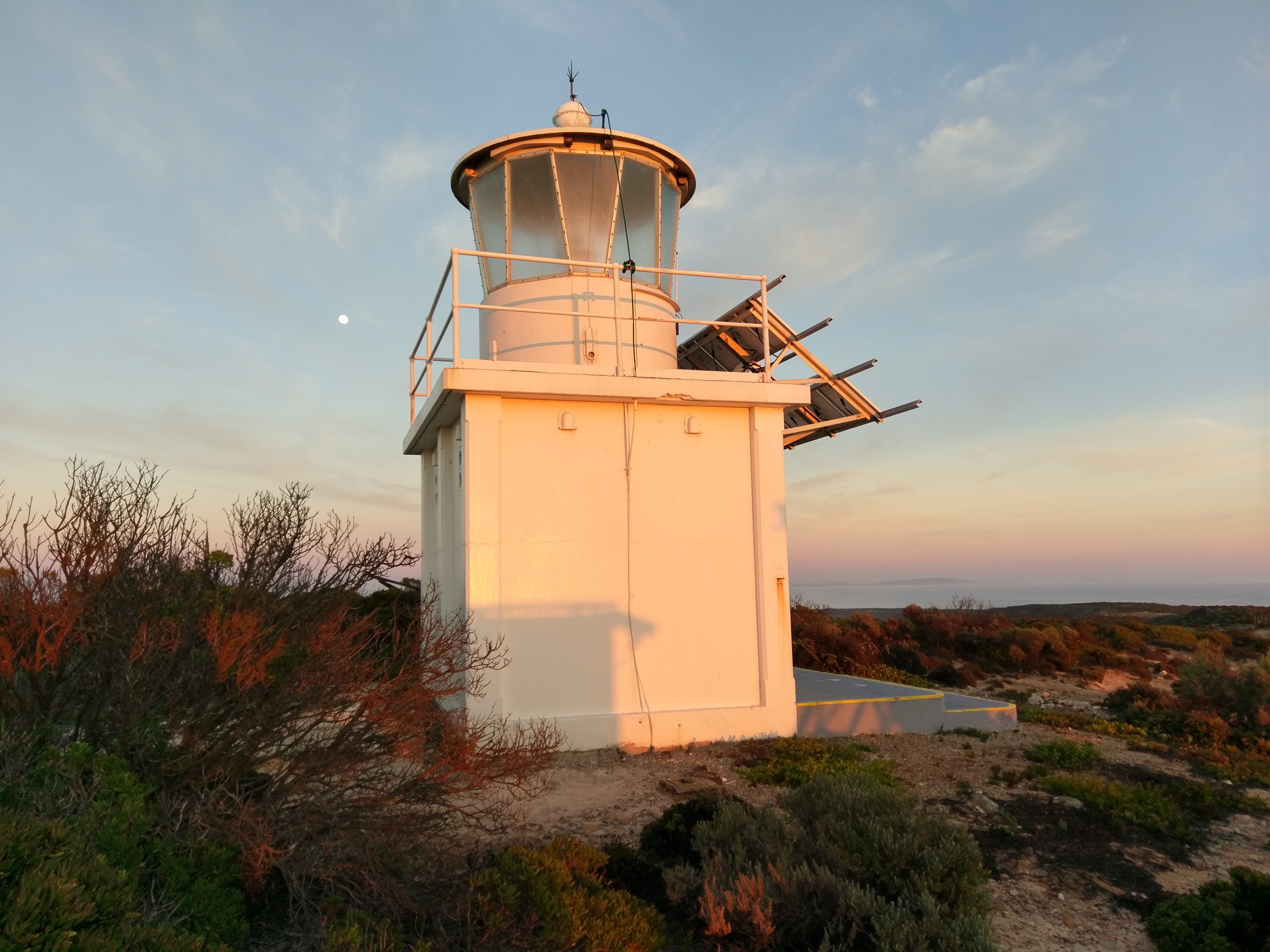
