= Joseph Octave Delepierre =

Belgian lawyer, archivist, diplomat, author and antiquary

Joseph Octave Delepierre (12 March 1802 – 18 August 1879) was a Belgian lawyer, archivist, diplomat, writer and antiquary. He spent his later life in the United Kingdom, and is best known for his studies of macaronic language and literature.

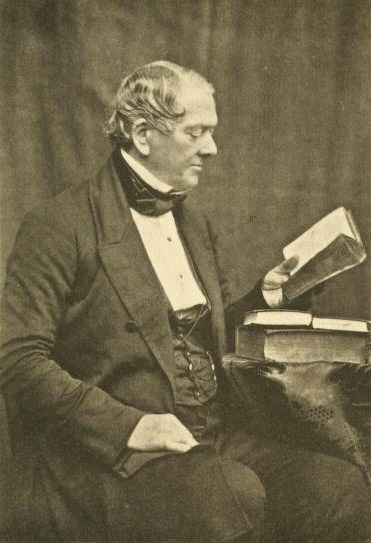
Joseph Octave Delepierre, after a photograph by Hugh Welch Diamond

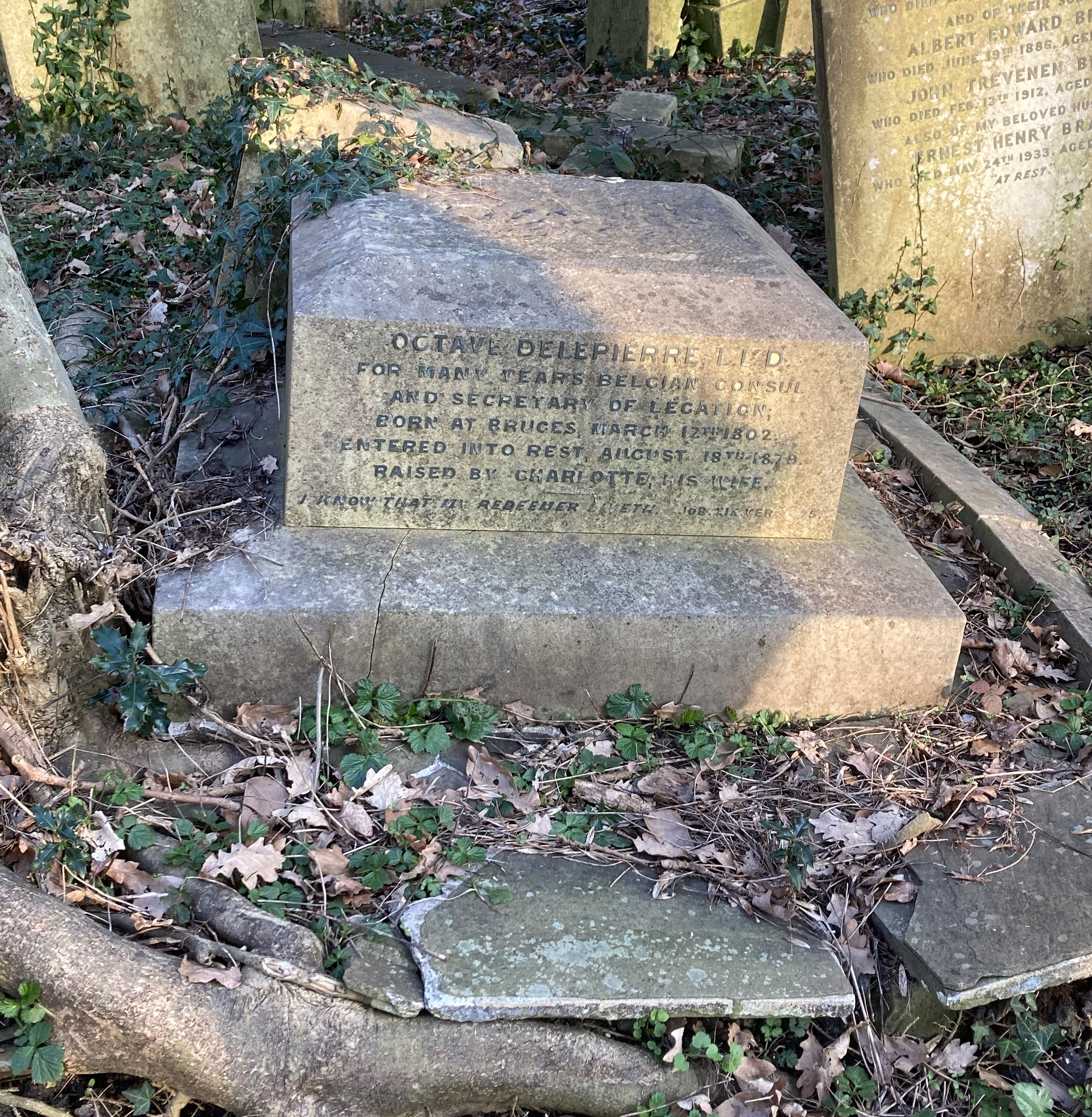
Grave of Octave Delepierre in Highgate Cemetery (east side)

== Life ==
He was born at Bruges in France (now in Belgium), 12 March 1802. His father was Joseph Delepierre, for many years receveur-général of the province of West Flanders; his mother was of the Penaranda family. Illiterate at age 12, he qualified for the University of Ghent. Having obtained the degree of doctor of laws, he became an avocat, and was appointed archivist of West Flanders, in Bruges.

A collector of books and works of art, Delepierre's reputation as a local antiquary attracted visitors from abroad. When Albert, Prince Consort was in Bruges in 1839, Delepierre was his guide. But he became dissatisfied with his official position, after an application for promotion was disregarded. He had made the acquaintance of Sylvain Van de Weyer, who induced him in 1843 to come to London, in August 1849 appointed him a secretary of legation, and obtained for him the post of Belgian consul. He made his way in society, and held Sunday evening receptions.

Delepierre was a fellow of the Society of Antiquaries of London, and a member of other English, Belgian, and French societies. He was decorated with several orders of knighthood. For over 35 years he acted as Belgian secretary of legation, and, until 1877, when he resigned, he was consul-general for Belgium in London.

Delepierre died 18 August 1879, aged 77, at the house of his son-in-law, Nicholas Trübner, 29 Upper Hamilton Terrace, London, and was buried in Highgate cemetery on 22 August.

== Works ==
Living in England, Delepierre wrote an account in 1849 of a collection of early French farces and morality plays in the British Museum. In 1852 he produced Macaronéana, followed by Macaronéana Andra in 1862. These publications formed an encyclopædia of information on macaronic literature.

When the Duc d'Aumale, Van de Weyer, Richard Monckton Milnes, and others founded the Philobiblon Society in 1853 (then limited to 36 members), Delepierre was appointed one of the honorary secretaries. He contributed 22 papers to its privately printed Miscellanies, among them being contributions on centos, on the literary history of lunatics, on parody, and on visions of hell; these he enlarged and republished separately. His major writings were produced during his residence in England. He printed a history of Flemish literature in 1860; the first volume, in 1863, of a collection (completed in 1876) of his friend Van de Weyer's writings. He also contributed to the Annales de la Société d'Emulation de Bruges (1839–43), Messager des Sciences Historiques (1833–79), Le Bibliophile Belge (1845–65), St. James's Magazine, and other journals.

=== Works to 1842 ===
The following is a complete list of Delepierre's works before he moved to the United Kingdom:

- Heures de loisir, essais poétiques, Ghent, 1829.
- Histoire du règne de Charles-le-Bon, précédée d'un résumé de l'histoire des Flandres, et suivie d'un appendice, Brussels, 1831, (with Jean Perneel). Translation of a contemporary life of Charles-le-Bon, by Gualbert of Bruges, with a continuation to the end of the fourteenth century.
- Chroniques, traditions et légendes de l'ancienne histoire des Flamands, Lille, 1834, (nineteen legends, reprinted with a different arrangement and another piece, under the title Chroniques, etc. … des Flandres, Bruges, 1834). Old legends were retold, with a slight addition of fiction.
- Précis des annales de Bruges, depuis les temps les plus reculés jusqu'au commencement du XVIIe siècle, augmenté d'une notice sur l'Hôtel-de-Ville, Bruges, 1835.
- Aventures de Tiel Ulenspiegel, de ses bons mots, finesses, et amusantes inventions: nouvelle édition, dediée aux Bibliophiles Belges, augmentée de rapprochemens littéraires et d'une notice des principales éditions, Bruges, 1835 (reprinted at Brussels in 1840 as Aventures de Tiel Ulenspiegel, illustrées par Lauters). Editions of Tiel Eulenspiegel, claiming a Flemish origin.
- Aperçu historique et raisonné des découvertes, inventions et perfectionnements en Belgique depuis les Romains, Bruges, 1836.
- Vision de Tondalus; récit mystique du douzième siècle, mis en français pour la première fois, Mons, 1837, (No. 5 of the publications of the Société des Bibliophiles de Mons; there is a list of works on visions). Translation of the Visio Tnugdali.
- Description des tableaux, statues, et autres objets d'art de la ville de Bruges, et abrégé de son histoire et de ses institutions, Bruges [1837].
- Album pittoresque de Bruges, ou collection des plus belles vues et des principaux monuments de cette ville, accompagnés d'un texte historique, Bruges, 1837, 2 parts.
- Guide dans Bruges, Bruges, 1837; 2me éd. 1838; 3me éd. 1840, (unaltered); 4me éd., published as Guide indispensable, 1847; 5me éd. 1851.
- Le Roman du Renard, traduit pour la première fois d'après un texte flamand du XIIe siècle, édité par J. F. Willems, augmenté d'une analyse de ce que l'on a écrit au sujet des romans français du Renard, Paris, 1837, (with bibliography). Edition of Reynard the Fox, for which he claimed a Flemish origin,
- Translation from the English of Thomas Colley Grattan's novel under the title of L'héritière de Bruges, Brussels, 1837, 3 vols.
- Chronique des faits et gestes admirables de Maximilien I durant son mariage avec Marie de Bourgogne, translatée du flamand en français pour la première fois et augmentée d'éclaircissements et de documents inédits, Brussels, 1839.
- Chronique de l'abbaye de Saint-André, traduite pour la première fois, suivie de mélanges, Bruges, 1839.
- De l'origine du Flamand, avec une esquisse de la littérature flamande et hollandaise d'après l'anglais du Rev. T. Bosworth, avec des additions et annotations, Tournay, 1840. Translation from Joseph Bosworth.
- Galerie d'artistes Brugeois, ou biographie des peintres, sculpteurs et graveurs célèbres de Bruges, Bruges, 1840, (with portraits after P. de Vlamynck).
- La Belgique illustrée par les sciences, les arts et les lettres, Brussels, 1840.
- Précis analytique des documents que renferme le dépôt des archives de la Flandre Occidentale, Bruges, 1840–2, 3 vols.; sér. 2, 1843–58, 9 vols. (the first series and vol. i. of the second series only bear Delepierre's name).
- Marie de Bourgogne, Brussels, 1840.
- Edouard III, roi d'Angleterre, en Belgique, chronique rimée écrite vers l'an 1347, par Jean de Klerk, d'Anvers, traduite pour la première fois en français, Ghent, 1841.
- Le château de Zomerghern, légende imitée du flamand de Ledeganck, Bruges, 1841.
- Châsse de Sainte-Ursule, peinte par Memling, lithographiée par MM. Ghemar et Manche de la grandeur des panneaux, coloriée d'après l'original par M. Malherbe fils, Bruges, 1841. This and the next are on the reliquary of St. Ursula, painted by Hans Memling.
- La châsse de Sainte-Ursule gravée au trait par Ch. Onghéna d'après Jean Memling, Brussels, 1841 (a different text by Delepierre and A. Voisin).
- Philippide de Guillaume-le-Breton: extraits concernant les guerres de Flandres, texte latin et français, avec une introduction, Bruges, 1841, (Recueil des chroniques, 2me sér., published by Société d'Emulation de Bruges). The Philippide of Guillaume-le-Breton,
- Fête de la Toison d'Or, célébrée à Bruges en 1478, Bruges, 1842.
- Collection des Kueren ou statuts de tous les métiers de Bruges, avec des notes philologiques par M. J. F. Willems, Ghent, 1842, (Liminaire signed by Delepierre; part of Recueil de chroniques, 3me sér., published by the Société d'Emulation de Bruges).
- Notice sur les tombes découvertes en août, 1841, dans l'église cathédrale de St. Sauveur à Bruges, Bruges, 1842.
- Monuments anciens recueillis en Belgique et en Allemagne par Louis Haghe, de Tournai, lithographiés d'après lui et accompagnés de notices historiques, Brussels, 1842, (plates with brief text; reissued in 1845, 2 vols.).
- Notice sur la cheminée de bois sculptée du Franc de Bruges, Bruges, 1842.

=== Works from 1843 ===
Delepierre wrote nothing between 1843 and 1845, when he published his first English book, Old Flanders.

- Le château de Winendale, Bruges, 1843.
- Biographie des hommes remarquables de la Flandre Occidentale, Bruges, 1843–9, 4 vols. (dedication signed by C. Carton, F. van de Putte, I. de Merseman, O. Delepierre; published by the Société d'Emulation de Bruges).
- Tableau fidèle des troubles et révolutions arrivés en Flandre et dans ses environs depuis 1500 jusqu'à 1585, par Beaucourt de Noortvelde, avec une introduction, Mons, 1845, (vol. xiv. of the publications of the Société des Bibliophiles Belges séant à Mons).
- Old Flanders, or Popular Traditions and Legends of Belgium, London, 1845, 2 vols. (adapted from Chroniques, traditions et légendes).
- Lettres de l'Abbé Mann sur les sciences et lettres en Belgique, 1773–88, traduites de l'anglais, Brussels, 1845.
- Mémoires historiques relatifs à une mission à la cour de Vienne en 1806, par Sir Robert Adair, traduites, Brussels, 1846.
- Coup d'œil rétrospectif sur l'histoire de la législation des céréales en Angleterre, Brussels, 1846.
- Examen de ce que renferme la Bibliothèque du Musée Britannique, Brussels, 1846.
- Description bibliographique et analyse d'un livre unique qui se trouve au Musée Britannique par Tridace-Nafé-Théobrome [pseudonym], au Meschacébé, 1849 (a collection of sixty-four French farces and moralities printed between 1542 and 1548, subsequently printed in the Ancien Théâtre Français, Paris, 1854–7, 10 vols., of which they formed the first three volumes).
- Macaronéana, ou mélanges de littérature macaronique des différents peuples de l'Europe, Paris, 1852.
- Bibliothèque bibliophilo-facétieuse, éditée par les frères Gébéodé, London, 1852–6, 3 vols. The pseudonym is for Gustave Brunet and Octave Delepierre, the four initials forming the pseudonym (the first volume consists of a reprint of a Rabelaisian satire by Guillaume Reboul, Le premier acte du synode nocturne, 1608; the second comprises an analysis of fourteen rare French and Italian books; and the third a collection of Chansons sur la cour de France).
- The Rose, its Cultivation, Use, and Symbolical Meaning in Antiquity, translated from the German, London, 1856.
- A Sketch of the History of Flemish Literature and its celebrated Authors from the Twelfth Century to the Present Time, London, 1860.
- Histoire littéraire des fous, London, 1860, (enlarged from articles in the ‘Miscellanies’ of the Philobiblon Society).
- Un point curieux des mœurs privées de la Grèce, Paris, 1861, (reprinted at Brussels in 1870); rewritten and enlarged as Dissertation sur les idées morales des Grecs, par M. Audé (Rouen, 1879). Anonymous, argues for a physical interpretation of some homosexual relationships in classical Greek literature.
- Analyse des Travaux de la Société des Philobiblon de Londres, London, 1862, (description of the first six volumes of the journal).
- Macaronéana andra, overum nouveaux mélanges de littérature macaronique, London, 1862 (250 copies reprinted from vol. vii. of the ‘Miscellanies’ of the Philobiblon Society; vol. ii. contains a paper by him on the same subject of which a few copies were reprinted in 1856).
- Les anciens peintres flamands, leur vie et leurs œuvres, par J. A. Crowe et G. B. Cavalcaselle, traduit de l'Anglais par O. D., annoté et augmenté par A. Pinchart et Ch. Ruelens, Brussels, 1862–5, 2 vols.
- Choix d'opuscules philosophiques, historiques, politiques et littéraires de Sylvain Van de Weyer, précédés d'avant-propos, sér. i.–iv., London, 1863–76, 4 vols.
- Machine intéressante à mouvement rotatoire, par M. Forsey, Lusarte, 1864, (facétie).
- Historical Doubts and contested Events, London, 1868, (reprinted from Miscellanies of the Philobiblon Society, the St. James's Magazine, etc., with bibliographical index).
- Revue analytique des ouvrages écrits en centon depuis les temps anciens jusqu' au XIXe siècle, London, 1868, (reprinted from vols. x. and xi. of the Philobiblon Society).
- La Parodie chez les Grecs, chez les Romains et chez les modernes, London, 1870, (from vol. xii. of the Philobiblon Society).
- Essai historique et bibliographique sur les Rébus, London, 1870 (with woodcuts of old French and Italian rebuses, and bibliography).
- Supercheries littéraires, pastiches, suppositions d'auteur, dans les lettres et dans les arts, London, 1872. A supplement to Joseph Marie Quérard's Supercheries Littéraires, but on a different plan.
- Tableau de la littérature du centon, chez les anciens et chez les modernes, London, 1874–5, 2 vols. (enlarged edition of the Revue analytique).
- L'Enfer, essai philosophique et historique sur les légendes de la vie future, London, 1876, (enlarged edition of L'Enfer décrit par ceux qui l'ont vu in Philobiblon Society, vols. viii. and ix., with bibliography; some copies have four photographs).

== Family ==
Delepierre was twice married, first to Emily, the sister of Robert Napier, 1st Baron Napier of Magdala, by whom he had two daughters. One of these died young, the other married Nicholas Trübner. His second wife, who survived him, was the widow of Captain Jasper Trowce.
