= Robinson Duckworth =

British priest (1834–1911)

The Reverend Canon Robinson Duckworth CVO VD
- Duckworth, c. 1873
- Born: 4 December 1834
- Died: 20 September 1911 (aged 76)
- Occupation: Clergyman

Ecclesiastical career
- Religion: Anglicanism
- Church: Church of England
- Congregations: St Mark's Church, Hamilton Terrace (1870–1906)
- Offices held: Sub-Dean and Canon of Westminster Abbey; Chaplain-in-Ordinary to Queen Victoria and King Edward VII

Academic background
- Education: Royal Institution School
- Alma mater: University College, Oxford

Academic work
- Institutions: Trinity College, Oxford
- Notable students: Prince Leopold, Duke of Albany

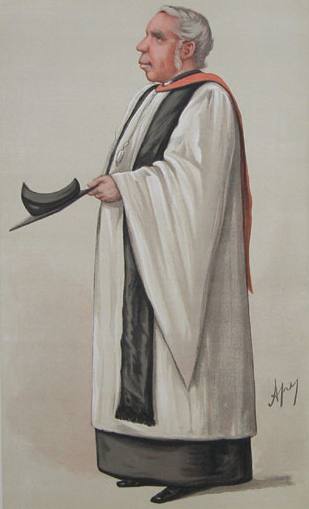
Rev. Robinson Duckworth, by Ape in Vanity Fair, 1886

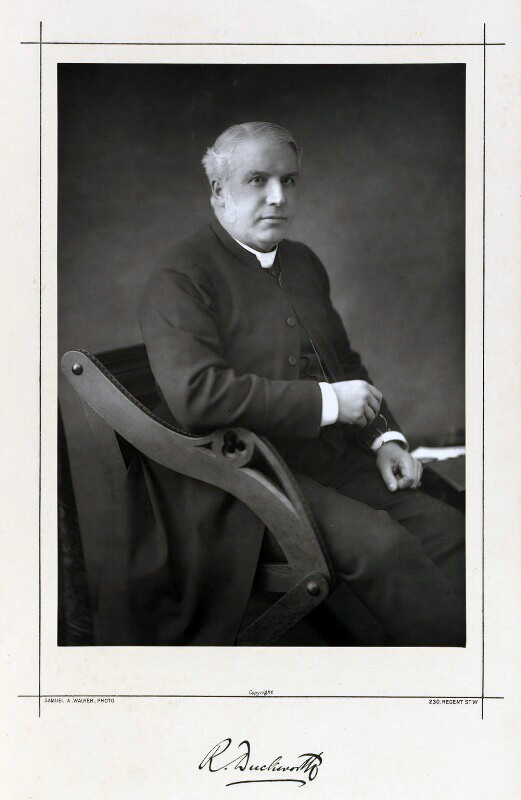
Robinson Duckworth (April 1890)

Robinson Duckworth CVO VD (4 December 1834 – 20 September 1911) was a British priest, who was present on the original boating expedition of 4 July 1862 during which Alice's adventures were first told by Lewis Carroll (Charles Lutwidge Dodgson). He is represented by the Duck in the book, a play on his last name.

He officiated at the funeral of Charles Darwin in 1882.

== Biography ==
Duckworth was the second son of Robinson Duckworth Sr. of Liverpool and his Scottish wife Elizabeth Forbes Nicol. He was educated at the Royal Institution School in Liverpool, and later at University College, Oxford, where he took his BA in 1857. He was a member of the Oxford Choral Society and a renowned singer. He took his MA in 1859, and his BD and DD in 1879. He was an Assistant Master at Marlborough College from 1857 to 1860. From 1860 to 1876 he was a Fellow of Trinity College, Oxford, where, from 1866 to 1870, he was Instructor and Governor to Prince Leopold, Duke of Albany, Queen Victoria's youngest son. In 1864 he was appointed Examining Chaplain to the Bishop of Peterborough.

While he was at Oxford Duckworth helped to row Alice Liddell and her sisters (daughters of Dr Liddell, Dean of Christ Church) on the river, returning from a picnic. In the boat was his friend Lewis Carroll who related for the first time his story which became Alice's Adventures in Wonderland. Robinson was immortalized as the Duck in the Jury Box and the Duck in the Pool of Tears in the book.

From 1870 to 1906 Duckworth was the incumbent of St. Mark's Church in Hamilton Terrace, in London's Maida Vale.

Duckworth was appointed Canon of Westminster in 1875 and later was also appointed Sub-Dean. He was Chaplain-in-Ordinary to Queen Victoria from 1870 to 1901, for which service he was appointed a Commander of the Royal Victorian Order (CVO) on 11 August 1902. He was Rural Dean for the parish of St. Marylebone from 1891 to 1905, and from 1875 to 1901 was Honorary Chaplain to the Prince of Wales, whom he accompanied on his 1875-6 tour of India. He was Chaplain-in Ordinary to Edward VII in 1910.

Robinson Duckworth was Almoner and Chaplain to the Order of St. John of Jerusalem, and Chaplain to the Civil Service Volunteers, being awarded the VD in 1901. He was a member of the Athenaeum and Grosvenor Clubs. He was elected a Member of the Worshipful Company of Musicians in January 1903.

On his death in 1911 he was buried in the choir of Westminster Abbey. Here a round window opposite the Abbey's entrance is dedicated to his memory. It was designed by Francis Skeat and was unveiled in 1988.

== Publications ==
A book entitled "The Holy Land" was written by The Rev Canon Duckworth, DD, CVO, Sub Dean of Westminster and Chaplain in Ordinary to the King and was published by Raphael Tuck & Sons Limited, London-Paris-New York, publishers by appointment to Their Majesties The King and Queen Alexandra.

The book was illustrated by W. J. Webb, from original drawings painted in Palestine.

== Popular culture ==
The character of Duckworth in the TV show Duck Tales was named after him.
