= Maud Baillie =

Australian woodcarver (1884–1961)

- Born: Alice Maude Golley; 17 December 1884; Port Lincoln, Australia
- Died: 1 November 1961 (aged 76)
- Known for: Woodcarving
- Spouse: Stuart Thomas Baillie

Maud Baillie (1884–1961), also known as Alice Maud Golley, was a self-taught South Australian woodcarver. Most of her work was done while she was in her teens and early twenties.

== Early life ==
Baillie was born as Alice Maud Golley on 17 December 1884 in Port Lincoln, in the Australian state of South Australia. It is likely that her mother, Mary Ann Golley (née Kean), was only in Port Lincoln to give birth, because she had for some time lived with her husband, William Charles Golley, on Wedge Island, off the coast of South Australia, where they were farmers. Her mother came from County Clare in Ireland, arriving in Australia in 1878 being unable to read or write. In 1880, she married Golley in North Adelaide and moved with him to Wedge Island, which he was already managing for the lessees of the island. Maud Baillie's brother eventually took over the freehold in 1915. They made a living on the island from breeding and selling a Clydesdale and pony crossbred horse, which was purchased by the British Army for use by the Indian Remount Veterinary Corps, as well from selling goat meat to passing ships. The family was largely self-sufficient and almost the only inhabitants of the island.

== Furniture making ==
Although Baillie apparently had no formal training, carving was a family pastime, with the men carving birds from the bones of cuttlefish that washed up on the shore. Additionally, carving was very popular with women in South Australia at that time and she is likely to have seen wood carving manuals. She designed and constructed furniture using wooden pegs instead of nails and screws, but the main feature of her work was the very detailed and elaborate designs she produced, with only basic tools. She used blackwood as well as wood washed ashore from shipwrecks. Baillie used the most common objects found on the island as inspiration for her designs, such as grape vines, rope, flowers and seashells. She also often incorporated the coat of arms of Australia, in recognition of the establishment of the Federation of Australia in 1901. In 1904, the governor of South Australia, Sir George Le Hunte, visited the island to shoot stubble quail. He met Baillie and was impressed by her work, which the local paper reported had been produced without any training. Le Hunte asked to see her tools, which were very basic and included a pocket knife. He and his shooting party then purchased a set of high-quality tools for her, although it was reported by her brother that she continued to use the tools made by her father. They also sent her a large quantity of blackwood, something not readily found on the island.

Le Hunte arranged for a large bookcase he had been shown in 1904 to be transported to the mainland and exhibited at the Royal Adelaide Show in September 1906. Local newspapers reported that there was no exhibit more viewed and that it was an example of what "unaided feminine enterprise can do". Baillie declined a job offer from a local manufacturer who had seen bookcase. In 1907, she exhibited two pieces of furniture at the 39-day Australian Exhibition of Women's Work in Melbourne, where she was awarded a special prize "for her interesting exhibit of wood carving, done under extreme circumstances". In 1911, Baillie's family moved to North Shields in South Australia where, in 1914, she undertook her only commission, making a large chair for the local priest. In 1922 she married Stuart Thomas Baillie (1893–1990), a wheelwright, farmer and shearer. She had two daughters and a son. While she may have continued to make furniture for her family, she never pursued a professional career.

== Death and legacy ==
Baillie died on 1 November 1961.

She had given a chiffonier to her brother William, and a bookcase to her brother Andrew, who had stayed on Wedge Island. This and other carved objects were taken to the mainland when he left the island. In 1937, when she was still alive, her nephew wrote a letter to a local newspaper to state that he not only possessed her bookcase but he also had other items she had carved. He invited readers to visit his house in Birkenhead, South Australia to view them. Other objects are in private collections around the country, including the chair created for the parish priest.

Her work is of historical and cultural significance because of the remote circumstances under which she worked, the patronage of the governor of South Australia and her intuitive talent without formal training. It is also considered to represent early Australian design at a time when furniture and art usually imitated English or European styles. It came to the attention of museum curators and scholars in the mid-1980s and the chiffonier was subsequently exhibited and photographs published in several books. An article about Baillie has been published in Australiana magazine. In the 2010s the Art Gallery of South Australia received a donation to acquire from Baillie's grandson the chiffonier, a chair, a cabinet with glass doors, a display cabinet with a drop-down bureau drawer, a carved frame containing a photograph of Baillie, and a painting by her of her home on the island.
