= Gambier Islands (South Australia) =

Archipelago in South Australia

Coordinates: 35°09′S 136°28′E

Geography
- Location: Spencer Gulf

Administration
- Australia

The Gambier Islands are a small group of islands lying between the southern tips of the Eyre and Yorke Peninsulas at the entrance to Spencer Gulf in South Australia. The islands lie within the 120 km^{2} Gambier Islands Group Marine Park.

== Description ==
By far the largest island in the group, at about 10 km^{2} in area, is Wedge Island. The others are North Island, South West Rock and Peaked Rocks. Except for Wedge Island, the group constitutes the Gambier Islands Conservation Park. Wedge Island is partly crown land and partly privately owned; it was used for farming for 130 years following European settlement of the region, and holds several buildings, mainly used as tourist accommodation, an airstrip, pier and a lighthouse. The waters around the islands are extensively used for commercial and recreational fishing and for recreational diving.

== Wildlife ==
Australian sea lions breed on the islands, and New Zealand fur seals may haul out there. Seabirds for which the islands are important include little penguins, short-tailed shearwaters and white-faced storm petrels. Other birds recorded there include rock parrots, bush stone-curlews, peregrine falcons, ospreys and white-bellied sea eagles. In 1869, the islands were known to support gulls, gannets, terns, penguins, muttonbirds and other seabirds. An etching showing a rocky feature of one of the islands and a flock of shearwaters in flight was published in the Illustrated Australian News for Home Readers in 1869.

A 1986 account of North Island described a population of "thousands" of muttonbirds and penguins there.
