= Flora Annie Landells =

Australian painter and potter (1888–1981)

- Born: Flora Annie Margaret Le Cornu; 1 April 1888; Adelaide
- Died: 30 July 1981 (aged 93); Nedlands
- Occupation: potter
- Spouse: Reg Landells

Flora Annie Margaret Landells born Flora Annie Margaret Le Cornu (1 April 1888 – 30 July 1981) was an Australian painter and potter. She is credited with inspiring interest in pottery in Perth.

== Life ==
Landells was born in 1888 in Adelaide. Her name was Flora Annie Margaret Le Cornu and her parents were Emma Trephena (born Cole) and John Le Cornu who was a gardener. It was her ambition to teach people to paint so in 1903 she set out on her own to study at Perth Technical School. Her fees covered the cost of tutors like James W. R. Linton and she was able to win scholarships to cover these costs. By 1904 she had joined an art society and by 1907 she was teaching art at the Methodist Ladies’ College.

She exhibited at the Australian Exhibition of Women’s Work in 1907 and the Franco-British Exhibition at Wembley in the UK in the following year.

She used a motif based on Sturt's Desert Pea to decorate some of her pottery tea sets from the 1910s when her work was being fired in Helen and May Creeth's kiln. In 1920 she imported her own kiln but her other equipment and her clay was created by her husband.

She was credited with inspiring interest in pottery in Perth. In 1925 she had established the Maylands School of Art in Maylands at the home she shared with her husband, Reg Landells. The school's students included Rolf Harris, Marina Shaw, Amy Harvey and Jean Darbyshire. Landells ran the school of art in addition to her art teaching in schools. She was organising a solo exhibition of her landscapes in 1927.

She and Reg Landells later created Landells Studio Pottery.

Landells died in Nedlands in 1981. Landells pottery is in the National Gallery of Australia.
