= J. W. R. Linton =

Australian artist

James Walter Robert Linton (1869–1947) was an influential West Australian artist and teacher.

== Life ==
Linton was born in 1869. His father was the artist Sir James Linton. James W. R. Linton emigrated to Australia in 1896 to look after his family's gold mining interests in Kalgoorlie after studying in England.

He established the Linton Art School in Perth in 1899 and became an art instructor at Perth Technical School until he retired in 1931. His students included the notable painter and potter Flora Annie Landells. He was also vice-president of the West Australian Art Society and a trustee of the Public Museum and Art Gallery of Western Australia.

On 26 April 1902 James W. R. Linton married Charlotte Barrow in Perth; she was a granddaughter of Major-General Joseph Lyon Barrow. James and Charlotte's son J.A.B. (Jamie) Linton became a silversmith after training from his father and became one of Australia's best-known metalworkers by the late 1940s.
