= Prince Leopold, Duke of Albany =

British prince (1853–1884)

Prince Leopold
- Duke of Albany
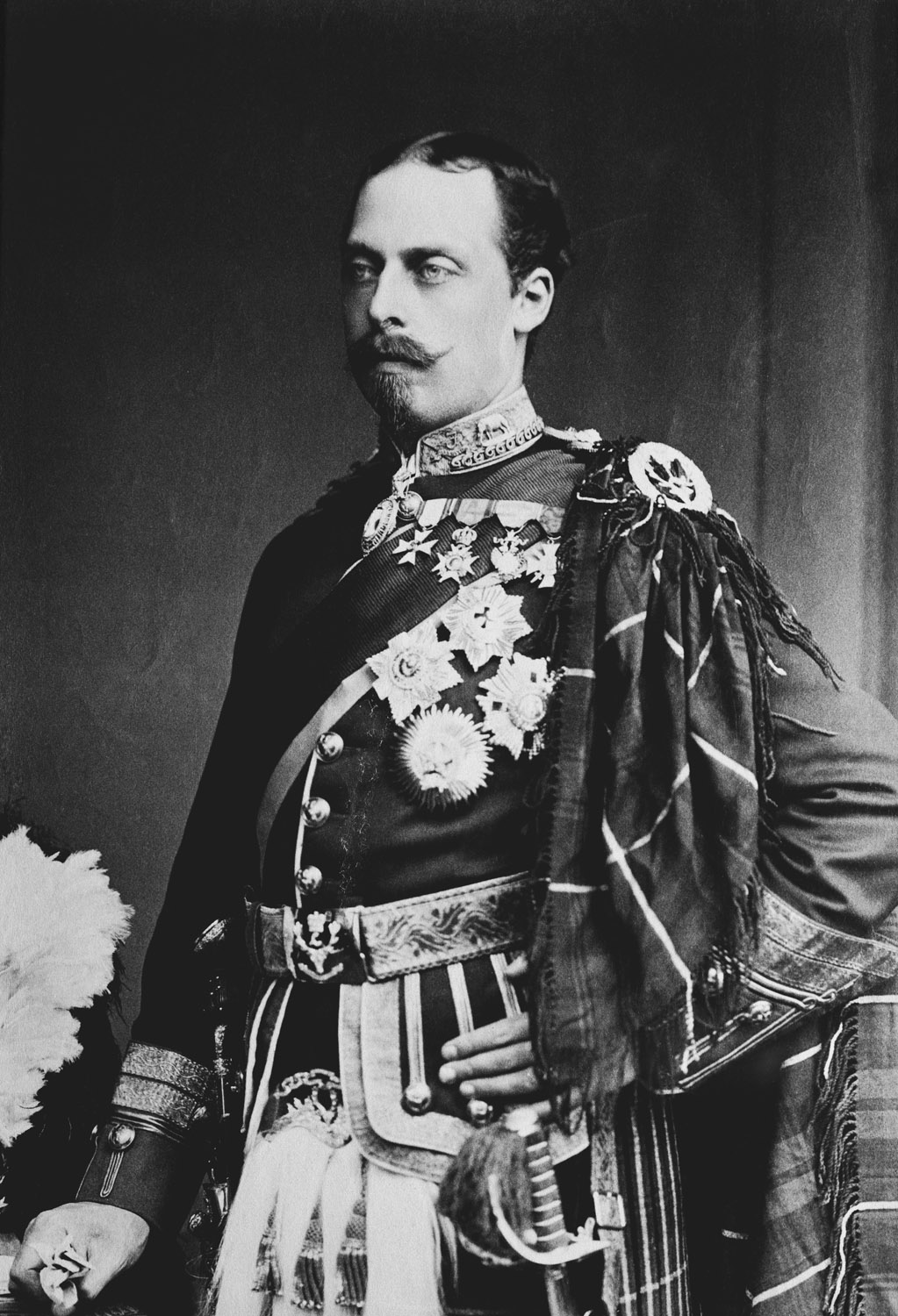
- Portrait by Maull & Fox, c. 1883
- Born: 7 April 1853; Buckingham Palace, London, England
- Died: 28 March 1884 (aged 30); Cannes, France
- Burial: 5 April 1884; Royal Vault, St George's Chapel, Windsor Castle; 23 June 1885; Albert Memorial Chapel, St George's Chapel
- Spouse: Princess Helen of Waldeck and Pyrmont (m. 1882)
- Issue: Princess Alice, Countess of Athlone; Charles Edward, Duke of Saxe-Coburg and Gotha
Names
- Leopold George Duncan Albert
- House: Saxe-Coburg and Gotha
- Father: Prince Albert of Saxe-Coburg and Gotha
- Mother: Queen Victoria
- Education: Christ Church, Oxford

Prince Leopold, Duke of Albany (Leopold George Duncan Albert; 7 April 1853 – 28 March 1884), was the eighth child and youngest son of Queen Victoria and Prince Albert. He was later created Duke of Albany, Earl of Clarence, and Baron Arklow. He had haemophilia, which contributed to his death following a fall at the age of 30.

== Early life ==
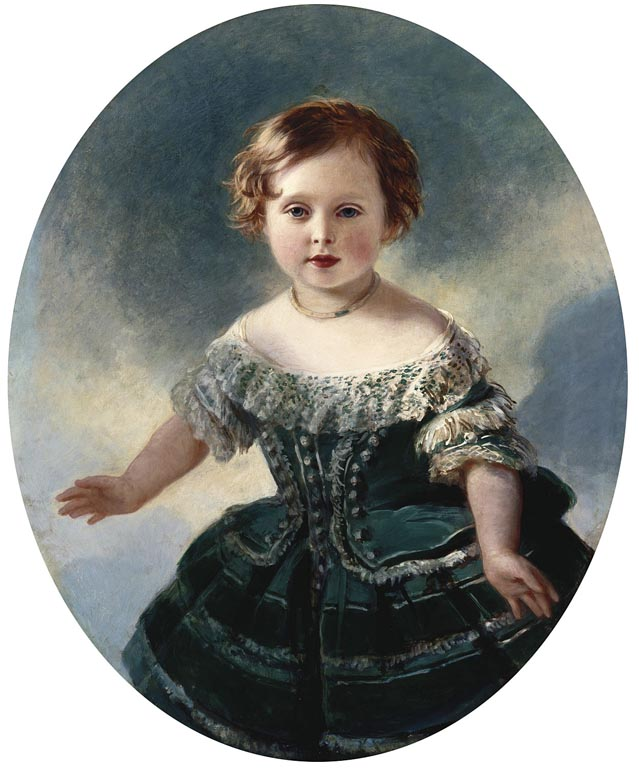
Prince Leopold in 1855

Leopold was born at 1:15 pm on 7 April 1853 at Buckingham Palace in London, the eighth child and youngest son of Queen Victoria and Prince Albert. During labour, Queen Victoria chose to use chloroform and thereby encouraged the use of anaesthesia in childbirth, recently developed by Professor James Young Simpson. The chloroform was administered by John Snow. As a son of the British sovereign, the newborn was styled His Royal Highness The Prince Leopold at birth. His parents named him after their mutual uncle, King Leopold I of Belgium.

He was baptised in the Private Chapel at Buckingham Palace on 28 June by the Archbishop of Canterbury, John Bird Sumner. His godparents were his first cousin once removed, King George V of Hanover; his fourth cousin once removed, Princess William of Prussia; his first cousin once removed, Princess Mary Adelaide of Cambridge; and his maternal uncle by marriage, Prince Ernst of Hohenlohe-Langenburg.

Leopold inherited the disease haemophilia from his mother, Queen Victoria, and was a delicate child. There was speculation during his life that he also had mild epilepsy, like his great-nephew Prince John. Archibald Anderson "Archie" Brown, John Brown's younger brother, became personal valet to Leopold.

== Education and career ==
The Prince's intellectual abilities were evident as a boy; Poet Laureate, Alfred, Lord Tennyson and his friend, philosopher James Martineau, were familiar with the Queen's children and had noted that Leopold, who had often "conversed with the eminent Dr. Martineau, was considered to be a young man of a very thoughtful mind, high aims, and quite remarkable acquirements". His daughter, Princess Alice, wrote in her memoirs that his "literary and artistic inclinations were encouraged and developed by his beloved tutor, Robert Collins". He was also tutored by Canon Duckworth and for two years before that, by a young Eton master called Mr. Shuldam.

=== Oxford University ===
Annuity to Prince Leopold Act 1874
- Act of Parliament
- Parliament of the United Kingdom
- Long title: An Act to enable Her Majesty to provide for the Support and Maintenance of His Royal Highness Prince Leopold George Duncan Albert on his coming of age.
- Citation: 37 & 38 Vict. c. 65
- Territorial extent: United Kingdom

Dates
- Royal assent: 7 August 1874
- Commencement: 7 April 1874 (Note: Section 1.)
- Repealed: 25 August 1894
Other legislation
Repealed by	Statute Law Revision Act 1894

Status: Repealed

Text of statute as originally enacted

In 1872, Leopold entered Christ Church, Oxford, where he studied a variety of subjects and became president of the Oxford University Chess Club. On coming of age in 1874, he was made a privy councillor and granted an annuity of £15,000. He left the university in 1876 with an honorary doctorate in civil law (DCL), and then travelled in Europe. In 1880, he toured Canada and the United States with his sister, Princess Louise, whose husband John Campbell, Marquess of Lorne, was Governor General of Canada. Leopold was a prominent patron of chess, and the London 1883 chess tournament was held under his patronage.

Incapable of pursuing a military career because of his haemophilia and the need to avoid even minor injuries, Leopold instead became a patron of the arts and literature and served as an unofficial secretary to his mother. "Leopold was the favourite son, and through him her relations with the Government of the day were usually kept up." Later he pursued vice-regal appointments in Canada and the Colony of Victoria, but his mother refused to appoint him, to his great unhappiness.

=== British Army ===
Despite his inability to pursue an active military role, he had an honorary association with the 72nd Regiment, Duke of Albany's Own Highlanders, and from 1881 served as the first Colonel-in-Chief of the Seaforth Highlanders, when that regiment was formed through the merger of the 72nd regiment with the 78th (Highlanders) Regiment of Foot. A portrait of Leopold in military uniform is held in the Royal Collection. The Seaforth Highlanders paraded at Leopold's funeral, a fact recorded by William McGonagall in his poem "The Death of Prince Leopold".

=== Freemasonry ===
Leopold was an active Freemason, being initiated in the Apollo University Lodge, Oxford, whilst resident at Christ Church. He was proposed for membership by his brother, Albert Edward, Prince of Wales, who was at the time the Worshipful Master of the Lodge, and was initiated in a joint ceremony with Robert Hawthorne Collins, his friend and tutor, who later became Comptroller of his Household.

Leopold served as Master of the Lodge from 1876 to 1877, and was later the Provincial Grand Master for Oxfordshire, still holding that office at the time of his death. In 1882 he laid the foundation stone of the Masonic Hall on Marlborough Street in Banbury.

== Marriage ==
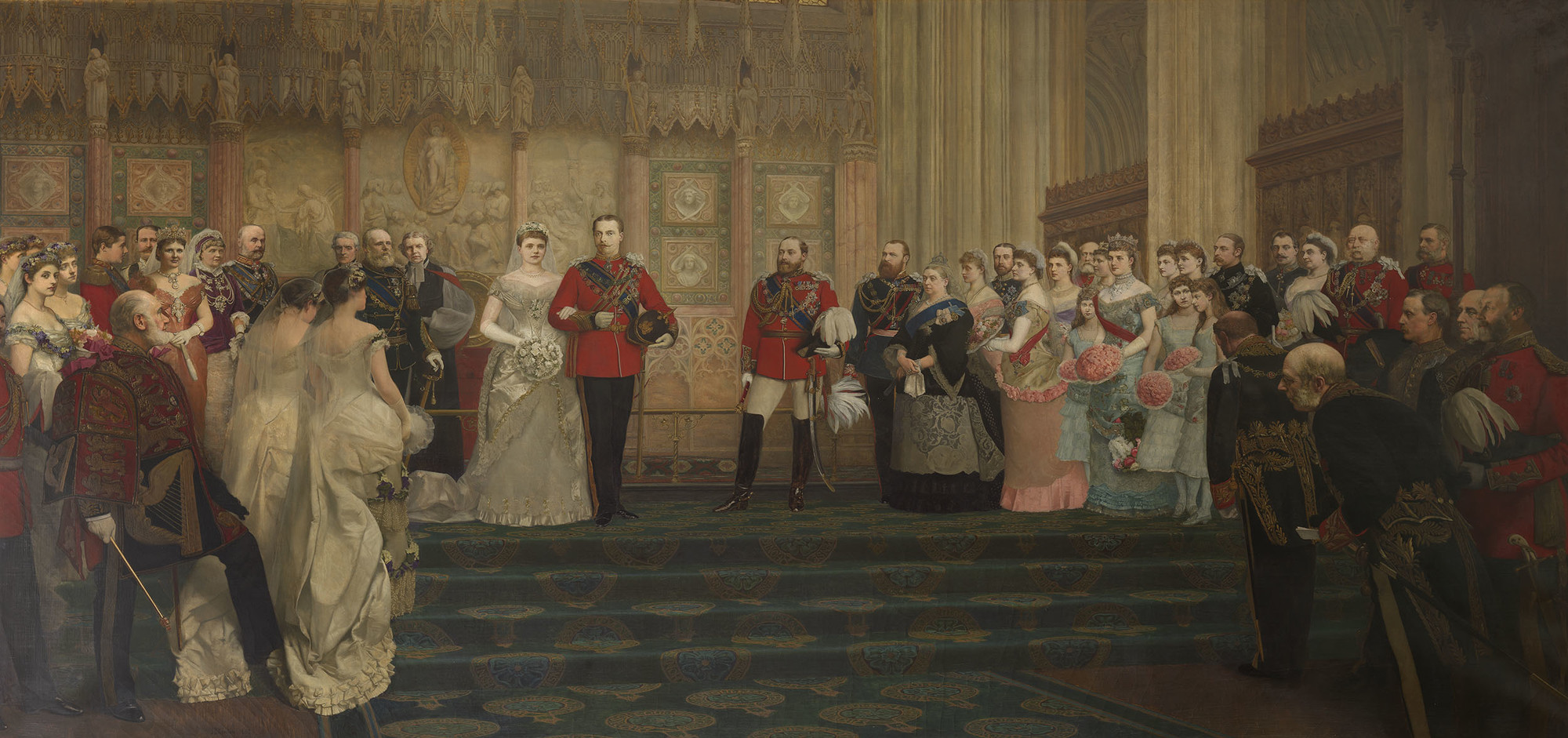
The Marriage of the Duke of Albany by James Dromgole Linton. The painting was commissioned by Queen Victoria but was finished in 1885 after Leopold's death.

Leopold, stifled by the desire of Queen Victoria to keep him at home, saw marriage as his only hope of independence. Due to his haemophilia, he had difficulty finding a wife. He was acquainted with Alice Liddell, the daughter of Henry Liddell, the Vice-Chancellor of Oxford for whom Lewis Carroll wrote Alice's Adventures in Wonderland. Leopold was the godfather of Alice's second son, who was named after him. It has been suggested that he considered marrying her, though others suggest that he preferred her sister Edith (for whom he later served as pallbearer on 30 June 1876).

Leopold also considered his second cousin Princess Frederica of Hanover as a bride; they instead became lifelong friends and confidants. Other royal and aristocratic women he pursued included heiress Daisy Maynard, Princess Elisabeth of Hesse-Kassel, Princess Karoline Mathilde of Schleswig-Holstein-Sonderburg-Augustenburg, Princess Stéphanie of Belgium and Princess Victoria of Baden. Leopold was very fond of Mary Baring, daughter of Lord Ashburton, but though she was equally fond of him, at 19, she felt she was too young to marry.

After rejection from these women, Victoria stepped in to bar what she saw as unsuitable possibilities. Insisting that the children of British monarchs should marry into other reigning Protestant families, Victoria suggested a meeting with Princess Helen Frederica, the daughter of George Victor, reigning Prince of Waldeck-Pyrmont, one of whose daughters had already married King William III of the Netherlands. On 27 April 1882, Leopold and Helen were married at St George's Chapel at Windsor Castle, and his income was raised by parliament to £25,000. They enjoyed a happy, albeit brief marriage. In 1883, Leopold became a father when his wife gave birth to a daughter, Alice. However, he did not live to see the birth of his son, Charles Edward.

== Illness and death ==
Leopold had haemophilia diagnosed in childhood, and in early years had various physicians in permanent attendance, including Arnold Royle and John Wickham Legg. In February 1884, Leopold went to Cannes on doctor's orders: joint pain is a common symptom of haemophilia and the winter climate in the United Kingdom was always difficult for him. His wife, pregnant at the time, stayed at home but urged him to go. On 27 March, at his Cannes residence, the 'Villa Nevada', he slipped and fell, injuring his knee and hitting his head. He died in the early hours of the next morning, apparently from a cerebral haemorrhage. His remains were interred in the Royal Vault and later buried in the Albert Memorial Chapel at Windsor. The court observed official mourning from 30 March 1884 to 11 May 1884.

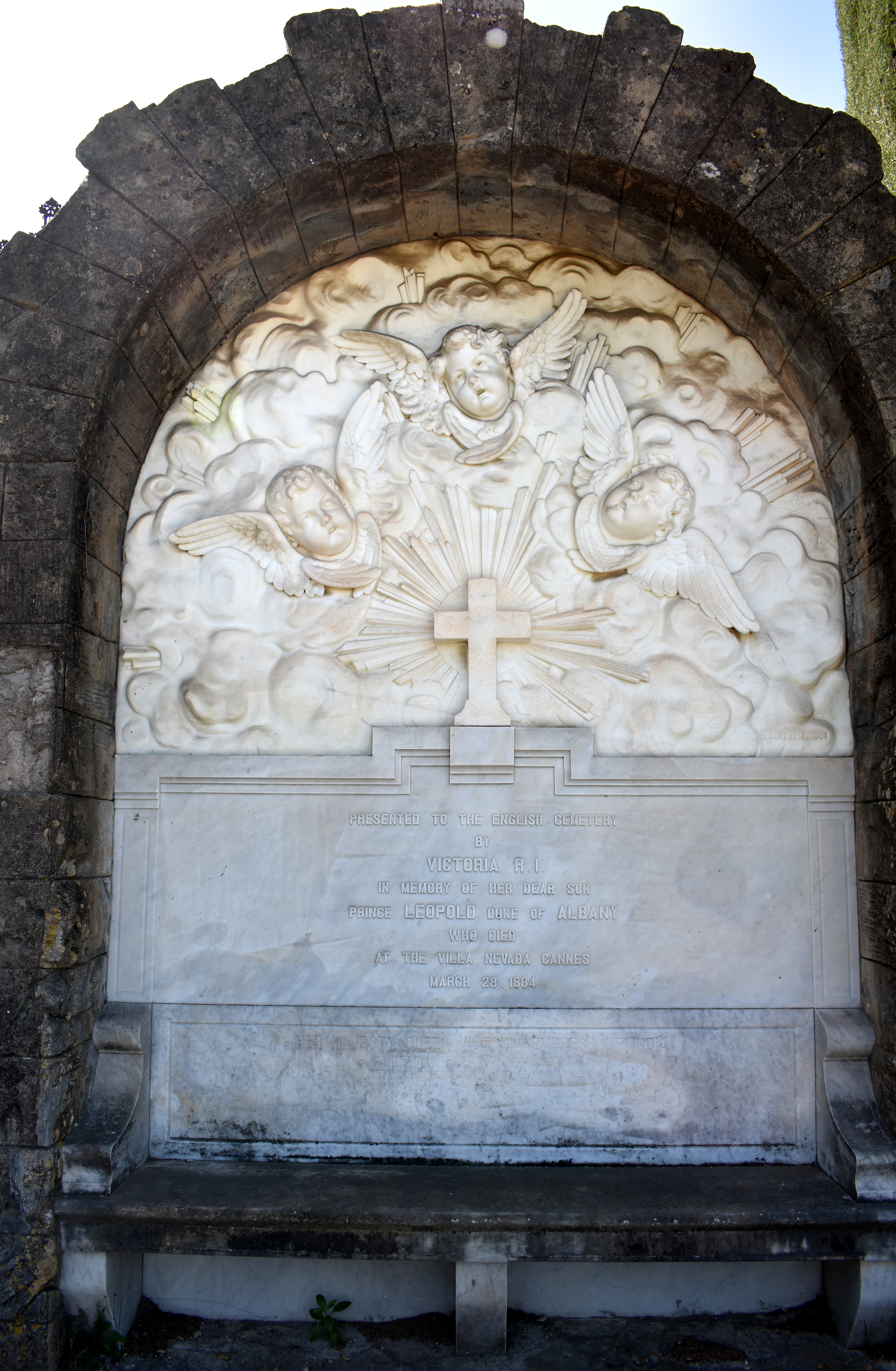
Cenotaph Memorial for Prince Leopold, Duke of Albany, in the Protestant Cemetery, Cimetière du Grand Jas, Cannes; the prince is buried in the Albert Memorial Chapel at Windsor Castle

Having died six years after his older sister Alice, Leopold was the second, but the youngest of Queen Victoria's children to die, being only 30 years old at the time of his death. His mother outlived him by seventeen years, by which time she had also outlived a third child, Alfred. Leopold's passing was lamented by the Scottish "poet and tragedian" William McGonagall in the poem "The Death of Prince Leopold". Queen Victoria wrote in her journal:

Another awful blow has fallen upon me & all of us today. My beloved Leopold, that bright, clever son, who had so many times recovered from such fearful illness, & from various small accidents, has been taken from us! To lose another dear child, far from me, & one who was so gifted, & such a help to me, is too dreadful!

The haemophilia gene is carried on the X chromosome, and is normally passed through female descent, as in the past few haemophiliac men survived to beget children. Any daughter of a haemophiliac is a carrier of the gene. Leopold's daughter Alice inherited the haemophilia gene, and passed it to her elder son Rupert.

Leopold's posthumous son, Prince Charles Edward, succeeded him as the 2nd Duke of Albany upon his birth four months later. Charles Edward succeeded his uncle Alfred as Duke of Saxe-Coburg and Gotha in 1900.

Leopold had been due to attend the 1884 FA Cup Final between Blackburn Rovers and Queens Park at Kennington Oval where he was expected to present the FA Cup and medals. However due to his death on the day before the final, they were not presented publicly. Instead, the FA's President handed them over to the teams in the Oval's dressing rooms.

== Titles, styles, honours and arms ==
=== Titles ===
Leopold was created Duke of Albany, Earl of Clarence and Baron Arklow on 24 May 1881.

=== Honours ===
British decorations

- Royal Knight Companion of the Garter, 29 May 1869
- Extra Knight of the Thistle, 24 May 1871
- Member of the Privy Council of the United Kingdom, 20 October 1874
- Knight Grand Commander of the Star of India, 25 January 1877
- Knight Grand Cross of St Michael and St George, 24 May 1880

Foreign decorations

- (Saxe-Coburg and Gotha) (Duchy of Saxe-Altenburg) (Saxe-Meiningen) Ernestine duchies: Grand Cross of the Saxe-Ernestine House Order, 1871
- Empire of Brazil: Grand Cross of the Southern Cross, 11 July 1871
- Grand Duchy of Hesse:
  - Grand Cross of the Ludwig Order, 19 April 1875
  - Grand Cross of the Merit Order of Philip the Magnanimous, 25 October 1878
- Kingdom of Greece: Grand Cross of the Redeemer, 12 July 1876
- (Kingdom of Hanover) Hanoverian Royal Family:
  - Knight of St. George, 23 June 1878
  - Grand Cross of the Royal Guelphic Order, 23 June 1878
- Belgium: Grand Cordon of the Order of Leopold (military), 20 October 1878
- Kingdom of Prussia:
  - Knight of the Black Eagle, with Collar, 31 March 1879
  - Grand Cross of the Red Eagle, 31 March 1879
- Sweden-Norway: Knight of the Seraphim, 24 May 1881
- Mecklenburg: Grand Cross of the Wendish Crown, with Crown in Ore and Diamonds, 1 August 1881
- Waldeck and Pyrmont: Civil Merit Order, 1st Class, 26 April 1882
- Württemberg: Grand Cross of the Württemberg Crown, 27 April 1882
- Netherlands: Grand Cross of the Netherlands Lion, 24 November 1882

=== Arms ===
In 1856, at the age of three, Prince Leopold was granted a personal coat of arms – the Royal Arms of the United Kingdom, with an inescutcheon of the shield of Saxony (representing his father), and all differenced by a label argent of three points, the centre point charged with a red cross and each outer point with a red heart.

Prince Leopold's coat of arms

=== Honorary degrees ===
On 30 January 1884, the University of Durham conferred the honorary degree of Doctor of Civil Law (DCL) upon Prince Leopold. The ceremony, held in Durham Cathedral Library, attracted many spectators. He later wrote to the university expressing a wish to become a member of University College.

== Issue ==
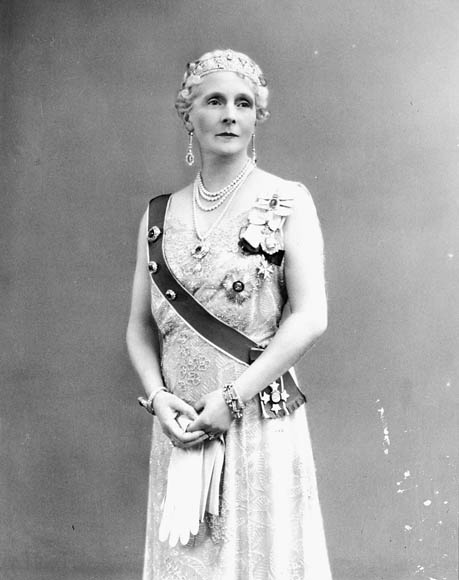
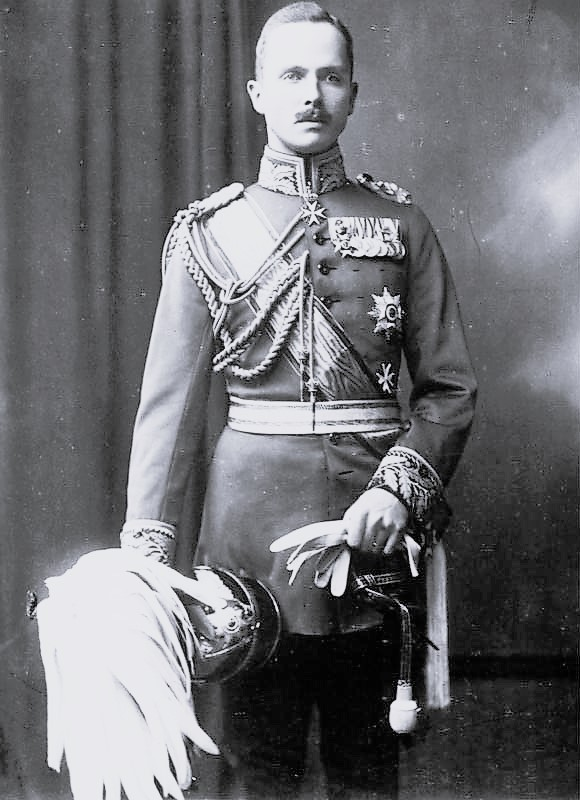
Image	Name	Birth	Death	Notes
	Princess Alice of Albany	25 February 1883	3 January 1981	She married Prince Alexander of Teck on 10 February 1904. They had three children.
	Prince Charles Edward, Duke of Albany	19 July 1884	6 March 1954	Born four months after his father's death; known as 'Charlie'; later the reigning Duke of Saxe-Coburg-Gotha. He married Princess Victoria Adelaide of Schleswig-Holstein on 11 October 1905. They had five children.

== In popular culture ==
The science fiction comedy film Kate & Leopold (2001) stars Hugh Jackman as a heavily fictionalised version of Leopold, Duke of Albany. In the film, Leopold is said to have invented the elevator, and his surname is Mountbatten, an anachronism.

== Ancestors ==
Ancestors of Prince Leopold, Duke of Albany

8. Francis, Duke of Saxe-Coburg-Saalfeld
4. Ernest I, Duke of Saxe-Coburg and Gotha
9. Countess Augusta Reuss of Ebersdorf
2. Prince Albert of Saxe-Coburg and Gotha
10. Augustus, Duke of Saxe-Gotha-Altenburg
5. Princess Louise of Saxe-Gotha-Altenburg
11. Duchess Louise Charlotte of Mecklenburg-Schwerin
1. Prince Leopold, Duke of Albany
12. George III of the United Kingdom
6. Prince Edward, Duke of Kent and Strathearn
13. Duchess Charlotte of Mecklenburg-Strelitz
3. Victoria of the United Kingdom
14. Francis, Duke of Saxe-Coburg-Saalfeld (= 8)
7. Princess Victoria of Saxe-Coburg-Saalfeld
15. Countess Augusta Reuss of Ebersdorf (= 9)

== Notes ==
Prince Leopold, Duke of Albany House of Saxe-Coburg and Gotha Cadet branch of the House of Wettin Born: 7 April 1853 Died: 28 March 1884
Peerage of the United Kingdom
New creation	Duke of Albany (creation of 1881); 1881–1884	Vacant Title next held by Prince Charles Edward
