= James Dromgole Linton =

English painter

- Linton, c. 1885-1890
- Born: 26 December 1840; London, England
- Died: 3 October 1916 (aged 75); Hampstead, London, England
- Burial place: Highgate Cemetery
- Education: Leigh's School of Art
- Occupations: Painter, lithographer

Sir James Dromgole Linton P.R.I. (1840–1916) was an English painter in oil and watercolour, and a lithographer.

== Life ==
Linton was born in London on 26 December 1840 and attended Leigh's School of Art. At the beginning of his career he was an illustrator and lithographer for The Graphic.

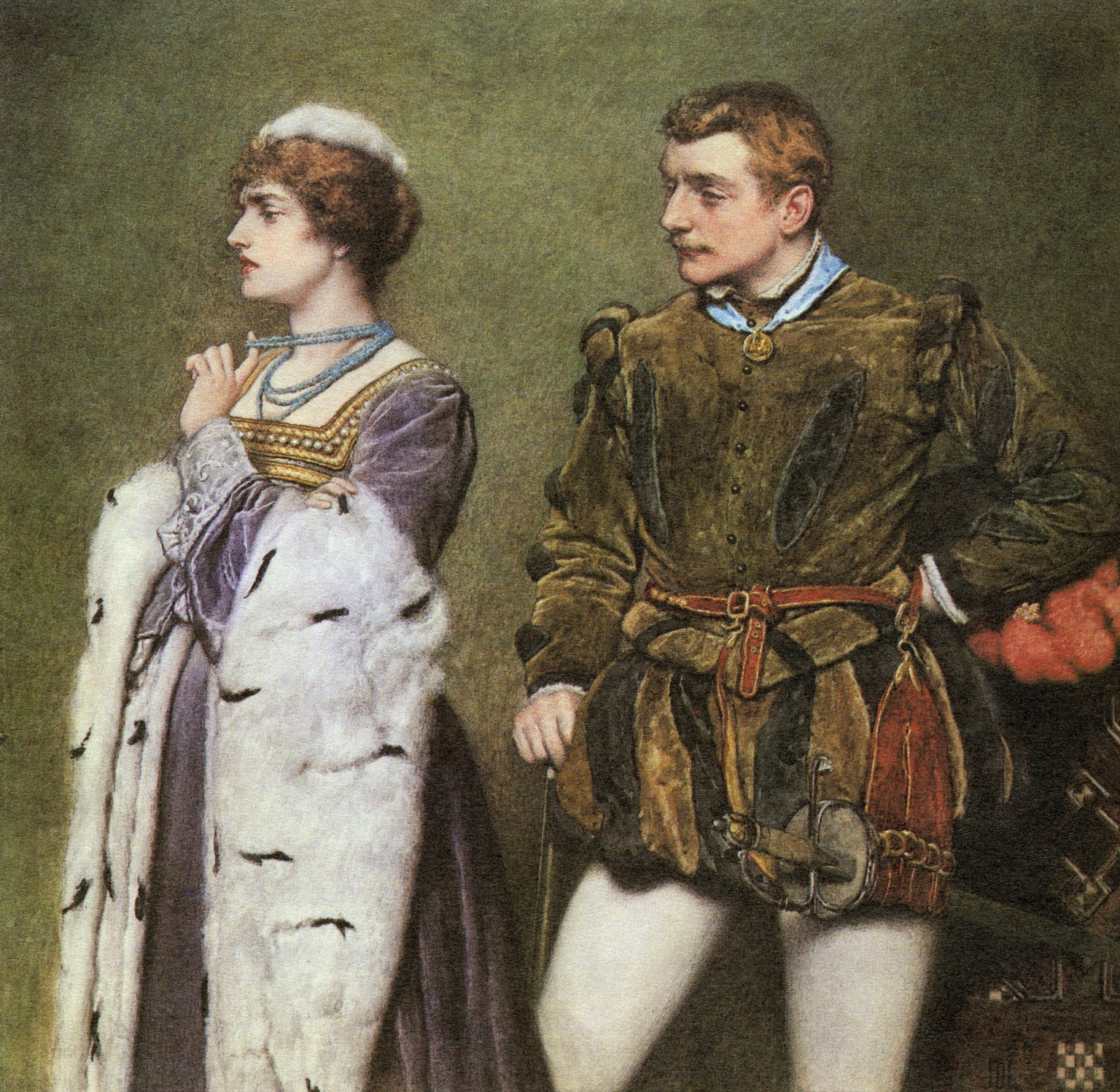
Watercolour of Katherine and Petruchio (The Taming of the Shrew)

One of his most famous oil paintings is The Marriage of H.R.H. the Duke of Albany, which was commissioned by Queen Victoria (The marriage depicted is that of Prince Leopold, Duke of Albany in 1882). Charles T. Jacoby, brother of Sir James Alfred Jacoby, commissioned a series of five oil paintings illustrating the "History of a Soldier of the Sixteenth Century" entitled The Declaration of War, The Benediction, The Surrender, Victorious, and The Banquet.

Linton was elected an associate in 1867 and a member in 1870 of the Royal Institute of Painters in Water Colours. He was president of the Royal Institute (so "P.R.I.") from 1884 to 1899 and then from 1909 until his death. In 1897 he won the Jubilee Medal. He was knighted in 1885.

He died at his home in Hampstead, London on 3 October 1916 and was buried on the western side of Highgate Cemetery.

== Children of Sir James ==
The artist J. W. R. Linton was the second of eleven children of Sir James Linton and his wife Harriet Maria, née Allen. The miniaturist Violet Linton was the fifth child. There were 6 sons and 5 daughters. Two of the sons, Edward and Tom, died in April 1877 and another son, Walter, died in October 1877 during an epidemic of scarlet fever. Of the 3 sons that survived childhood, Henry emigrated to Argentina, James emigrated to Australia, and Robert emigrated to South Africa. The 5 daughters survived childhood and remained in England. The children of Sir James and Harriet were:

- Henry Rose Roach (1868–1949).
- James Walter Robert (1869–1947). J. W. R. Linton attended the Slade School of Fine Art in London and in 1899–1901 founded the Linton School of Art in Perth, Australia.
- Edward Burton (1870–1877).
- Tom (1872–1877).
- Violet Harriet (1874–1955), who gained a considerable reputation as a miniaturist and in 1910 married Thomas John Cheater (c. 1863–1956).
- Walter John (1875–1877).
- Robert John (1878–1954).
- Mary (1879–1952).
- Helen (1881–1963).
- Christine (1883–1967).
- Margaret Cecilia (1886–1968).
