= Wedge Island (South Australia) =

Island in South Australia

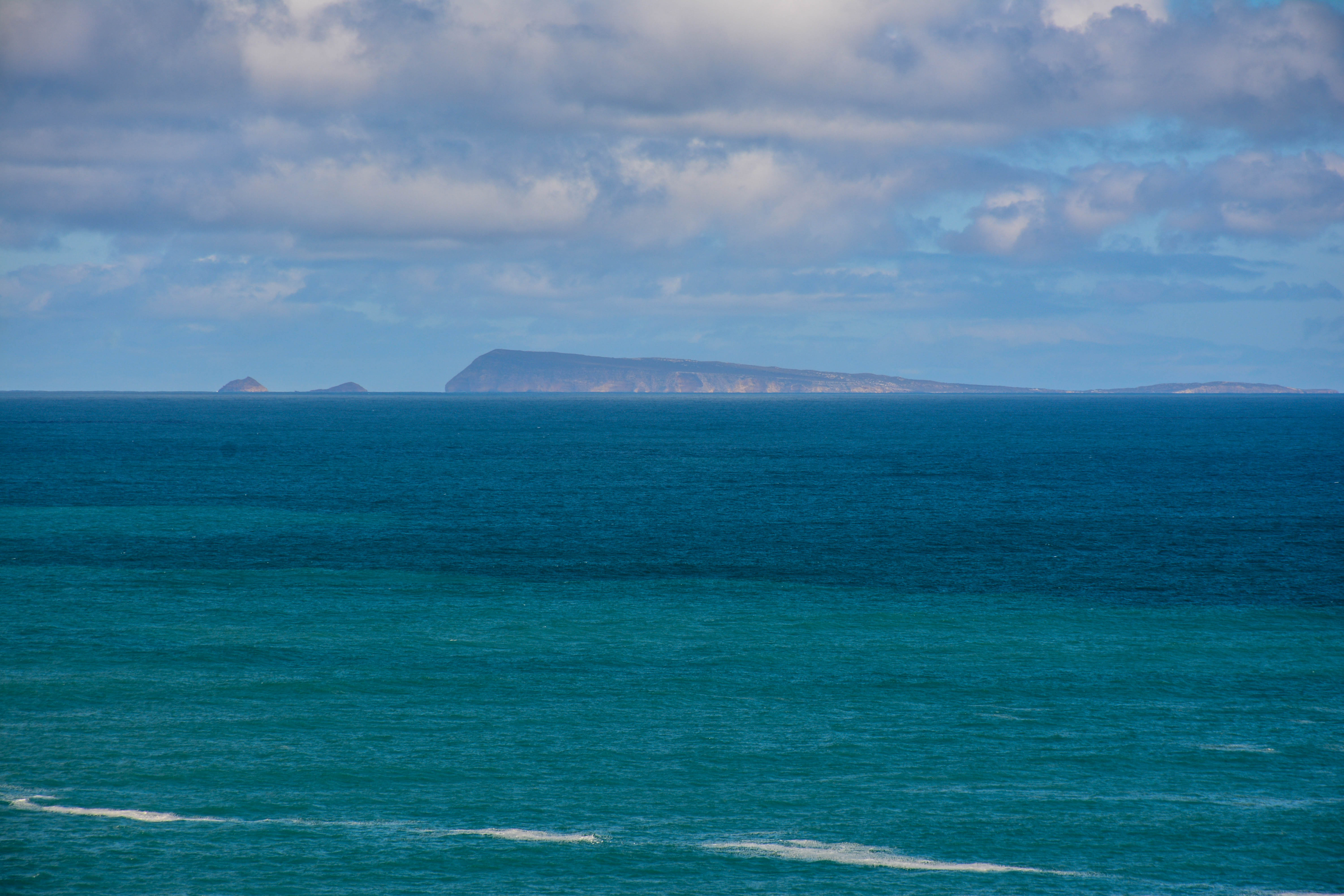
- View from Royston Head

- Location within South Australia

Geography
- Location: Spencer Gulf
- Coordinates: 35.1554°S 136.4649°E

Administration
- Australia

Wedge Island is an island in the Australian state of South Australia located within the island group known as the Gambier Islands near the entrance to Spencer Gulf. It is the largest of the Gambier Islands, covers an area of about 10 square kilometres (3.9 sq mi) and is partly privately owned.

== Description ==
The island is a privately owned island. There is a lighthouse at the south-eastern end, and highest point, of the island. There is an airstrip on the island as well as a jetty. The island has one permanent resident as of 2021. There is a farmhouse for the use of the owners of the island. There are two private holiday houses and two Holiday Rentals. It is a base for local and offshore recreational fishing. It is also a dive site.

== History ==
Wedge Island was named in 1802 by Matthew Flinders. It was originally settled in the mid-19th century as a farm for breeding horses for the British Indian Army, with various agricultural activities such sheep and cattle grazing and wheat cropping continuing for the next 130 years.

Maud Baillie (born Golley in 1884) was raised on the island and was noted as a skilful furniture maker and wood carver. Her furniture was pegged together without the use of nails or screws. The governor, Sir George Le Hunte, was said to have been impressed when he visited in 1904 by her carving. She exhibited two pieces of her furniture in the Australian Exhibition of Women's Work in 1907. Her family moved away in 1911. Her work is today in the Art Gallery of South Australia.

In 1929, Andrew Golley left the island after living there for forty years. He had originally moved there with his parents. His interest in the island was transferred to H. R. Littley who moved there with his wife, son, daughter and son-in-law.

During World War II, Wedge Island was used as a radar station by the Royal Australian Air Force (RAAF). A bunker was constructed near the lighthouse and was occupied by about 40 RAAF personnel for several years.

== Flora and fauna ==
=== Fauna ===
An account of the wildlife on Wedge Island from 1928 reads:

"The penguins were busy with their half-grown youngsters, and after dark the night echoed to their weird and ghostlike cries. Quail were plentiful among the grass paddocks and flew up almost from beneath our feet, while high above our heads a pair of wedge-tailed eagles wheeled and circled then planed slowly down to alight upon a lone pinnacle of the rocky western coast."

Further detail appears in a 1929 account:

"Seabirds abound. Penguins and hair seals (Australian sealions) are on Wedge Island also. About September, mutton birds arrive in huge flocks. They breed extensively on Gambier Island, which is close to Wedge."

Little penguins are known to have lived on the island from at least 1924, and were known to the Gambier Islands since at least 1869. A 1986 account of North Island described a population of "thousands" of muttonbirds and penguins there. Little penguin breeding sites were noted in a 1996 survey of South Australia's offshore islands.

A 1928 account of the Haycocks (off Wedge Island) describes a party from the Avocet filming the "large number" of seals there.

In 2004 there were estimated to be fewer than 100 little penguins in the colony.

==== Introduced species ====
The island has had many species introduced to it since European colonisation. It has been used to breed horses for re-mounting of the British armed forces in India. It has also been ravaged by goats. Turkeys were plentiful there in the 1920s.

Southern hairy-nosed Wombats were introduced in 1971 to boost tourism appeal and there are now about 300 living on the island. The endangered Brush-tailed Bettong has been introduced to the island for the purpose of conserving the species.

=== Wedge Island Important Bird Area ===
Wedge island has been identified as an Important Bird Area by BirdLife International, an international non-governmental organization, because it supports over 1% of the world population, with up to about 16,000 breeding pairs, of white-faced storm-petrels.
