= List of islands named after people =

This is a list of islands known to be named after individual people. It details the name of the island, its location and eponym.

Island	Country or location	Eponym
Ackerman Island	United States	Joseph Ackerman
Agios Efstratios	Greece	Saint Eustratius (Όσιος Ευστράτιος ο Θαυματουργός), who lived on the island in the 9th century as an exile, because he was opposed to the iconoclastic policies of the Byzantine Emperor Leo the Armenian
Agios Georgios	Greece	Saint George
Alejandro Selkirk Island	Chile	Alexander Selkirk
Alexander Island	Antarctica	Alexander I of Russia
Allen Island	Australia	John Allen
Amherst Island	Canada	Jeffery Amherst, 1st Baron Amherst
Amherst Island	Canada	Jeffery Amherst, 1st Baron Amherst
Amund Ringnes Island	Canada	Amund Ringnes
Annenkov Island	South Georgia and the South Sandwich Islands	Mikhail Annenkov
Annette Island	United States	Annette Whitney Dall
Axel Heiberg Island	Canada	Axel Heiberg
Baffin Island	Canada	William Baffin
Bainbridge Island	United States	Commodore William Bainbridge
Baker Island	United States	Captain Michael Baker
Ball's Pyramid	Australia	Lieutenant Henry Ball
Banks Island	Canada	Joseph Banks
Baranof Island	United States	Alexander Andreyevich Baranov
Barrow Island	Australia	Sir John Barrow, 1st Baronet
Bartolomé Island	Ecuador	Sir Bartholomew James Sulivan
Bathurst Island	Australia	Henry Bathurst, 3rd Earl Bathurst
Bathurst Island	Canada	Henry Bathurst, 3rd Earl Bathurst
Beauchene Island	Falkland Islands	Jacques Gouin de Beauchêne
Bedford Island	Antarctica	Thomas Bedford
Belcher Islands	Canada	Edward Belcher
Bellingshausen Island	South Georgia and the South Sandwich Islands	Fabian von Bellingshausen
Bentinck Island	Canada	Lord George Bentinck (possibly)
Bering Island	Russia	Vitus Bering
Berkner Island	Antarctica	Lloyd Berkner
Bermuda	Bermuda	Juan de Bermúdez
Bernard Island	Antarctica	Claude Bernard
Bernier Island	Australia	Pierre-François Bernier (presumably)
Bismarck Archipelago	Papua New Guinea	Otto von Bismarck
Bjarnason Island	Canada	Matt Bjarnason
Blakely Island	United States	Johnston Blakeley
Block Island	United States	Adriaen Block
Borden Island, Northwest Territories/Nunavut	Canada	Robert Borden
Bougainville	Papua New Guinea	Louis Antoine de Bougainville
Boularderie Island	Canada	Louis-Simon le Poupet de la Boularderie
Bouvet Island	Norway	Jean-Baptiste Charles Bouvet de Lozier
Bowen Island, British Columbia	Canada	James Bowen (Royal Navy officer)
Bowen Island (Jervis Bay)	Australia	Richard Bowen RN
Bowyer Island, British Columbia	Canada	Sir George Bowyer, 5th Baronet
Brenton Island	South Africa	Jahleel Brenton
Bristol Island	South Georgia and the South Sandwich Islands	Augustus Hervey, 3rd Earl of Bristol
Brock Island, Northwest Territories	Canada	Reginald W. Brock
Brown Island, Northwest Territories	United States	John G. Brown
Bruny Island	Australia	Bruni d'Entrecasteaux
Burnaby Island	Canada	Robert Burnaby
Busta Rhymes Island	United States	Busta Rhymes
Bylot Island	Canada	Robert Bylot
Camano Island	United States	Jacinto Caamaño
Campobello Island	Canada	Lord William Campbell (with name Italianized)
Cape Chidley Islands	Canada	John Chidley
Carleton Island	United States	Guy Carleton, 1st Baron Dorchester
Charles Alexander Island	Russia	Charles Alexander
Charles Island	United States	Charles Deal
Charlton Island	Canada	Charles I of England
Charron Island	Canada	François Charron
Cheeseman Island	New Zealand	Thomas Frederick Cheeseman
Chichagof Island	United States	Vasili Chichagov
Chirikof Island	United States	Alexei Chirikov
Choiseul Island	Solomon Islands	Étienne François, duc de Choiseul
Churchill Island	Australia	John Churchill
Clapperton Island	Canada	Hugh Clapperton
Clark Island	Australia	Lieutenant Ralph Clark
Clark Island	United States	Midshipman John Clark
Clarke Island	Australia	William Clarke
Clerke Rocks	South Georgia and the South Sandwich Islands	Charles Clerke
Clipperton Island	France	John Clipperton
Coats Island	Canada	William Coats
Cockburn Island	Canada	Francis Cockburn
Colville Island	United States	Andrew Colville
Cook Islands	Cook Islands	James Cook
Cook Island	South Georgia and the South Sandwich Islands	James Cook
Cooper Island	South Georgia and the South Sandwich Islands	Robert Palliser Cooper
Cornwallis Island	Canada	William Cornwallis
Cortes Island, British Columbia	Canada	Hernán Cortés
Christiansø	Denmark	Christian V of Denmark
Crown Prince Frederik Island	Canada	
Crozier Island	Greenland	Francis Crozier
Curtis Island	Australia	Roger Curtis
Dall Island	United States	William Healey Dall
Darwin Island	Ecuador	Charles Darwin
Island Davaar	Scotland	Saint Barr
Dawson Island	Chile	See Dawson (surname)
Decatur Island	United States	Stephen Decatur
Delarof Islands	United States	Evstratii Ivanovich Delarov
D'Entrecasteaux Islands	Papua New Guinea	Bruni D'Entrecasteaux
Diego Garcia	British Indian Ocean Territory	Diego García de Moguer
Diego Ramírez Islands	Chile	Diego Ramírez
Digges Islands	Canada	Dudley Digges
Diomede Islands	United States Russia	Saint Diomedes
Dirk Hartog Island	Australia	Dirk Hartog
Dorre Island	Australia	Peter Dorre
Douglas Island	United States	John Douglas
Douglas Island	Canada	James Douglas (presumably)
D'Oyly Carte Island	England	Richard D'Oyly Carte
Doumer Island	Antarctica	Paul Doumer
Drake's Island	England	Francis Drake
Drummond Island	United States	Gordon Drummond
Dundas Island	Canada	Henry Dundas, 1st Viscount Melville
Dundas Island	Canada	Henry Dundas, 1st Viscount Melville
Durell's Island	Canada	Captain Thomas Durell
D'Urville Island	New Zealand	Jules Dumont d'Urville
Edgell Island	Canada	Captain Edgell
Edgeøya	Norway	Thomas Edge
Eilean Chaluim Chille	Scotland	Saint Columba
Eilean Donan	Scotland	Saint Donan
Ellef Ringnes Island	Canada	Ellef Ringnes
Ellesmere Island	Canada	Francis Egerton, 1st Earl of Ellesmere
Ellis Island	United States	Samuel Ellis (colonial New Yorker)
Ernst Thälmann Island	Cuba	Ernst Thälmann
Eskilsø	Denmark	Eskil of Lund
Faure Island	Australia	Pierre Faure
Fergusson Island	Papua New Guinea	Sir James Fergusson, 6th Baronet
Fernandina Island	Ecuador	Ferdinand II of Aragon
Fernando de Noronha	Brazil	Fernão de Loronha
Fisher Island	United States	Carl G. Fisher
Flaherty Island	Canada	Robert J. Flaherty
Flinders Island	Australia	Matthew Flinders
Floreana Island	Ecuador	Juan José Flores
Fort Denison	Australia	William Denison
Fox Island	United States	J.L. Fox
Franklin Island	Antarctica	Sir John Franklin
Franklin Island	Greenland	Sir John Franklin
Franz Josef Land	Russia	Franz Joseph I
Fraser Island	Australia	Eliza Fraser
Fraser Island	Canada	Robert James Fraser
Freeman Island	United States	J.D. Freeman
Frobisher's Farthest	Canada	Martin Frobisher
Frost Island	United States	Boatswain John Frost
Galiano Island, British Columbia	Canada	Dionisio Alcalá Galiano
Gambier Island, British Columbia	Canada	James Gambier, 1st Baron Gambier
Gambier Islands	French Polynesia	James Gambier, 1st Baron Gambier
Geiger Key	United States	Henry Huling Geiger
Graham Island	Canada	Sir James Graham, 2nd Baronet
Graham Bell Island	Russia	Alexander Graham Bell
Gravina Island	United States	Federico Carlos Gravina y Nápoli
Gravina Islands	United States	Federico Carlos Gravina y Nápoli
Gribbell Island	Canada	Rev. Francis Barrow Gribbell
Grindal Island	Australia	Thomas Grindall
Guemes Island	United States	Juan Vicente de Güemes, 2nd Count of Revillagigedo
Guido Island	Antarctica	Carlos Guido Spano
Guss Island	United States	Guss Hoffmaster
Guy Fawkes Island	Ecuador	Guy Fawkes
Hall Island	Russia	Charles Francis Hall
Hannah Island	Greenland	Hannah (Tookoolito)
Hans Island	Canada or Greenland	Hans Hendrik
Hantzsch Island	Canada	Bernhard Hantzsch
Harstine Island	United States	Lt. Henry J. Hartstene
Havelock Island	India	Henry Havelock
Hawkesbury Island	Canada	Charles Jenkinson, 1st Earl of Liverpool (Lord Hawkesbury)
Heard Island and McDonald Islands	Australia	William Heard and John McDonald
Hearst Island	Antarctica	William Randolph Hearst
Henderson Island	Pitcairn Islands	Captain Henderson EIC
Hendrik Island	Greenland	Hendrik Olsen
Henry Island	United States	Henry Wilkes
Henry Lawrence Island	India	Henry Montgomery Lawrence
Herron Island	United States	Lewis Herron
Hooker Island	Russia	Joseph Dalton Hooker
Hopkins Island	Australia	John Hopkins
Hornby Island, British Columbia	Canada	Geoffrey Hornby
Howe Island, Ontario	Canada	William Howe, 5th Viscount Howe
Hutt Island, British Columbia	Canada	John Hutt (Royal Navy officer)
Île Bizard, Quebec	Canada	Jacques Bizard
Île d'Orléans, Quebec	Canada	Henri II, Duke of Orléans
Île Jésus, Quebec	Canada	Jesus
Île Perrot	Canada	François-Marie Perrot
Île Saint-Louis	France	Louis IX of France
Îles Laval	Canada	François de Laval
Inchcolm	Scotland	Saint Columba
Inch Kenneth	Scotland	Saint Kenneth
Inchmarnock	Scotland	Saint Mearnag
Inchmurrin	Scotland	Saint Meadhran/Mirren
Innis Chonan	Scotland	Saint Conan
Isabela Island	Ecuador	Isabella I of Spain
Island of Mozambique	Mozambique	Mussa Bin Bique
Isle La Motte	United States	Pierre La Motte
Isle Martin	Scotland	Saint Martin
Jackson Island	Russia	Frederick George Jackson
Jahleel Island	South Africa	Jahleel Brenton
James Island	United States	Reuben James
James Ross Island	Antarctica	James Clark Ross
Jan Mayen Island	Norway	Jan Jacobs May van Schellinkhout
Jens Munk Island	Greenland	Jens Munk
Joe Island	Greenland	Joe (Ipiirvik or Ebierbing)
John Lawrence Island	India	John Lawrence, 1st Baron Lawrence
Johnston Atoll	United States	Captain Charles J. Johnston
Jones Island	United States	Jacob Jones
Jorge Montt Island	Chile	Jorge Montt
Jossart Island	United States	Prosper Jossart
Juan de Nova Island	French Southern and Antarctic Lands	João da Nova
Juan Fernández Islands	Chile	Juan Fernández (explorer)
Keats Island (British Columbia)	Canada	Richard Goodwin Keats
Kennedy Island	Solomon Islands	John F. Kennedy
Keppel Island	Falkland Islands	Admiral Augustus Keppel
Kerguelen	French Southern and Antarctic Lands	Yves-Joseph de Kerguelen de Trémarec
Kermadec Islands	New Zealand	Jean-Michel Huon de Kermadec
Ketron Island	United States	William Kittson (name badly misspelt by cartographers)
Kilian Island	Canada	Bernhard Kilian
King George Island	Antarctica	George III of the United Kingdom
King George Islands	Canada	George III of the United Kingdom
King George Islands	French Polynesia	George III of the United Kingdom
King Island	Australia	Philip Gidley King
King William Island	Canada	William IV of the United Kingdom
Kirkland Island	Canada	John Kirkland
Korovin Island	United States	Ivan Korovin (presumably)
Kupreanof Island	United States	Ivan Antonovich Kupreianov
Kupriyanov Islands	South Georgia and the South Sandwich Islands	Ivan Kupriyanov
Lady Franklin Island	Canada	Lady Jane Franklin
Lady Julia Percy Island	Australia	Lady Julia Helen Percy
Lanzarote	Spain	Lancelotto Malocello
Lemesurier Island	United States	Midshipman William Le Mesurier
Lennox Island	Canada	Charles Lennox, 4th Duke of Richmond
Lewis Island	Australia	George Lewis
Little Island	Australia	John Little
Little Wellington Island	Chile	Arthur Wellesley, 1st Duke of Wellington
Loks Land	Canada	Michael Lok
Lockwood Island	Greenland	James Booth Lockwood
Lopez Island	United States	Gonzalo López de Haro
Lord Howe Island	Australia	Richard Howe, 1st Earl Howe
Louise Island	Canada	Princess Louise, Duchess of Argyll
Lulu Island	Canada	Lulu Sweet
Macauley Island	New Zealand	George Mackenzie Macaulay
MacDonald Island	Canada	James F. MacDonald
Mackenzie King Island	Canada	William Lyon Mackenzie King
MacKlintok Island	Russia	Francis Leopold McClintock
Macquarie Island	Australia	Lachlan Macquarie
Magdalen Islands	Canada	Madeleine Fontaine, seigneur François Doublet's wife
Malcolm Island	Canada	Pulteney Malcolm
Manoel Island	Malta	António Manoel de Vilhena
Mansel Island	Canada	Robert Mansell
Manuel Rodriguez Island	Chile	Manuel Rodríguez Erdoíza
Marchena Island	Ecuador	Frey Antonio de Marchena
Margaret Island	Hungary	Saint Margaret of Hungary
Mauritius	(Mauritius) Indian Ocean	Maurice of Nassau
Mayne Island	Canada	Richard Mayne
McIntyre Island	Antarctica	Robert McIntyre, USN
McNeil Island	United States	William Henry McNeill
McNish Island	South Georgia and the South Sandwich Islands	Harry McNish
Melville Island	Australia	Robert Dundas, 2nd Viscount Melville
Melville Island	Canada	Robert Dundas, 2nd Viscount Melville
Milne Land	Greenland	David Milne
Mitkof Island	United States	Admiral Prokofy Mitkov
Money Island	China (claimed by Taiwan and Vietnam)	William Taylor Money
Montagu Island	South Georgia and the South Sandwich Islands	John Montagu, 4th Earl of Sandwich
Moresby Island	Canada	Fairfax Moresby
Moresby Island	Canada	Fairfax Moresby
Moreton Island	Australia	James Douglas, 14th Earl of Morton
Mornington Island	Australia	Richard Wellesley, 1st Marquess Wellesley (also Earl of Mornington)
Moore Island	Canada	Elwood S. Moore
Mudge Island	Canada	William Fitzwilliam Mudge
Namiseom	South Korea	Nam I
Nansen Island	Antarctica	Fridtjof Nansen
Nansen Island	Russia	Fridtjof Nansen
Necker Island	British Virgin Islands	Johannes de Neckere
Necker Island	United States	Jacques Necker
Neil Island	India	James George Smith Neill
Nicholson Island	India	R.T. Nicholson
Normanby Island	Papua New Guinea	George Phipps, 2nd Marquess of Normanby
North Rona	Scotland	Saint Ronan
North Seymour Island	Ecuador	Lord Hugh Seymour
North Tweedsmuir Island	Canada	John Buchan, 1st Baron Tweedsmuir
Ogasawara Islands	Japan	Ogasawara Sadayori
Orcas Island	United States	Juan Vicente de Güemes, 2nd Count of Revillagigedo, whose full name included the name Horcasitas
Ostrovul Sfintu Gheorghe	Romania	Saint George
Palmerston Island	Cook Islands	Henry Temple, 2nd Viscount Palmerston
Parker Island	Canada	Lieutenant George Ferdinand Hastings Parker
Pavlof Islands	United States	Pitka Pavlof
Pearse Island	Canada	William Alfred Rombulow Pearse, RN
Pender Island	Canada	Daniel Pender
Peter Island	British Virgin Islands	Pieter Adriensen
Peter I Island	Antarctica (claimed by Norway)	Peter I of Russia
Phillip Island	Australia	Arthur Phillip
Pickersgill Islands	South Georgia and the South Sandwich Islands	Richard Pickersgill
Picton	Chile	Thomas Picton
Pitt Island	New Zealand	William Pitt, 1st Earl of Chatham
Porcher Island	Canada	Edwin Augustus Porcher
Pribilof Islands	United States	Gavriil Pribilof
Prince Leopold Island	Canada	Prince Leopold of Saxe-Coburg-Saalfeld
Prince of Wales Island (Alaska)	United States	George Augustus Frederick, Prince of Wales
Prince of Wales Island (Nunavut),	Canada	Albert Edward, Prince of Wales
Prince of Wales Island (Queensland)	Australia	George Augustus Frederick, Prince of Wales
Prince Charles Island	Canada	Charles, Prince of Wales
Prince Edward Island	Canada	Prince Edward Augustus, Duke of Kent and Strathearn, father of Queen Victoria
Prince Patrick Island	Canada	Prince Arthur William Patrick, Duke of Connaught and Strathearn
Princess Elisabeth Island	Belgium	Princess Elisabeth, Duchess of Brabant
Prinsesse Dagmar Island	Greenland	Princess Dagmar of Denmark
Príncipe Island	São Tomé and Príncipe	Afonso, Prince of Portugal
Quadra Island, British Columbia	Canada	Juan Francisco de la Bodega y Quadra
Queen Adelaide Archipelago	Chile	Adelaide of Saxe-Meiningen
Queen Elizabeth Islands	Canada	Queen Elizabeth II
René-Levasseur Island	Canada	René Levasseur
Revillagigedo Island	United States	Juan Vicente de Güemes, 2nd Count of Revillagigedo
Revillagigedo Islands	Mexico	Juan Vicente de Güemes, 2nd Count of Revillagigedo
Rikers Island	United States	Abraham Rycken (Dutch settler)
Robinson Island	Hong Kong	Sir Hercules Robinson, former Governor of Hong Kong
Robinson Crusoe Island	Chile	Robinson Crusoe (fictional character)
Rob Roy Island	Solomon Islands	Rob Roy MacGregor
Roderick Island	Canada	Roderick Finlayson
Roosevelt Island	Antarctica	Franklin D. Roosevelt
Roosevelt Island	United States	Franklin D. Roosevelt
Ross Island	Antarctica	James Clark Ross
Rothschild Island	Antarctica	Édouard Alphonse de Rothschild
Rudolf Island	Russia	Rudolf, Crown Prince of Austria
Sabine Island	Greenland	Edward Sabine
Saint Barthélemy	France	Bartholomew Columbus
St Catherine's Island	Wales	Catherine of Alexandria
Saint Helena	Saint Helena, Ascension and Tristan da Cunha	Helena of Constantinople
St Ignace Island	Canada	Ignatius of Loyola
Saint John	United States Virgin Islands	John the Apostle
Saint Kitts	Saint Kitts and Nevis	Saint Christopher
St. Lawrence Island, Alaska	United States	Lawrence of Rome
Saint Lucia	(Saint Lucia) Caribbean Sea	Saint Lucy
Saint Martin	France; Sint Maarten	Martin of Tours
St Martin's	England	Martin of Tours
St Mary's	England	Saint Mary
St Michael's Isle	Isle of Man	Saint Michael
St Ninian's Isle	Scotland	Saint Ninian
St Patrick's Isle	Isle of Man	Saint Patrick
St Paul's Island	Malta	Saint Paul of Tarsus
Saint Pierre Island	France	Saint Peter
St Serf's Inch	Scotland	Saint Serf
Saint Tudwal's Islands	Wales	Tudwal
Saint Vincent	Saint Vincent and the Grenadines	Vincent of Saragossa
Salisbury Island	Russia	Rollin D. Salisbury
San Andrés Island	Colombia	Saint Andrew
San Clemente Island, California	United States	Saint Clement
San Cristóbal Island	Ecuador	Saint Christopher
San Domino	Italy	Saint Domnius
San Juan Island, Washington	United States	Juan Vicente de Güemes, 2nd Count of Revillagigedo
San Juan Islands, Washington	United States	Juan Vicente de Güemes, 2nd Count of Revillagigedo
San Niccolò	Italy	Saint Nicholas
San Nicolas Island, California	United States	Saint Nicholas
San Pietro Island	Italy	Saint Peter
Santa Catalina Island, California	United States	Catherine of Alexandria
Santa Isabel Island	Solomon Islands	Saint Elizabeth
Santa Luzia	Cape Verde	Saint Lucy
Santa Maria Island	Portugal	Saint Mary
Sant'Antioco	Italy	Saint Antiochus
Santiago Island	Cape Verde	Saint James
Santo Antão Island	Cape Verde	Saint Anthony
Santorini	Greece	Saint Irene
São Jorge Island	Portugal	Saint George
São Miguel Island	Portugal	Saint Michael
São Nicolau Island	Cape Verde	Saint Nicholas
São Tomé Island	São Tomé and Príncipe	Saint Thomas
São Vicente Island	Cape Verde	Vincent of Saragossa
Saunders Island, South Sandwich Islands	South Georgia and the South Sandwich Islands	Charles Saunders (Royal Navy officer)
Saunders Island, Greenland	Greenland	James Saunders, RN
Schouten Island	Australia	Joost Schouten
Seychelles	(Seychelles) Indian Ocean	Jean Moreau de Séchelles
Shaw Island	United States	John Shaw
Shaw Islands	Antarctica	John E. Shaw
Shumagin Islands	United States	Nikita Shumagin
Sinclair Island (Washington)	United States	Arthur Sinclair
Sint Eustatius	Caribbean Netherlands	Saint Eustace
Sir Hugh Rose Island	India	Hugh Rose, 1st Baron Strathnairn
Sir William Peel Island	India	Sir William Peel
Smith Island	Australia	William Smith
Smith Island	Antarctica	William Smith (not same as above)
Smith Island	United States	John Smith
Solander Islands	New Zealand	Daniel Solander
Somerville Island	Antarctica	Crichton Somerville
Spieden Island	United States	Purser William Speiden
Søren Norby's Island	Greenland	Søren Norby
South Georgia	South Georgia and the South Sandwich Islands	George III of the United Kingdom
South Tweedsmuir Island	Canada	John Buchan, 1st Baron Tweedsmuir
Starbuck Island	Kiribati	Valentine Starbuck
Stefansson Island	Canada	Vilhjalmur Stefansson
Stewart Island	New Zealand	William W. Stewart
Stretch Island	United States	Samuel Stretch
Stuart Island	United States	Frederick D. Stuart
Sverdrup Islands	Canada	Otto Sverdrup
Sveti Đorđe	Montenegro	Saint George
Sveti Nikola	Montenegro	Saint Nicholas
Sveti Stefan	Montenegro	Saint Stephen
Sweyn Holm	Scotland	Sweyn Asleifsson
Tagg's Island	England	Tom Tagg
Tasmania	Australia	Abel Tasman
Tanner Island	South Georgia and the South Sandwich Islands	William G. Tanner
Taylor Island	Australia	William Taylor
Tennent Islands	Canada	James Emerson Tennent
Theodore Roosevelt Island	United States	Theodore Roosevelt
Thistle Island	Australia	John Thistle
Tobias Island (Tuppiap Qeqertaa)	Greenland	Tobias Gabrielsen
Townshend Island	Australia	Thomas Townshend, 1st Viscount Sydney
Traill Island	Greenland	Thomas Stewart Traill
Traversay Islands	South Georgia and the South Sandwich Islands	Jean-Baptiste Prevost de Sansac, Marquis de Traversay
Tristan da Cunha	Saint Helena, Ascension and Tristan da Cunha	Tristão da Cunha
Truss's Island	England	Charles Truss
U Thant Island	United States	U Thant
Valdes Island	Canada	Cayetano Valdés y Flores
Vancouver Island	Canada	George Vancouver
Vashon Island	United States	James Vashon
Vendovi Island	United States	Ro Veidovi
Victoria Island	Canada	Queen Victoria
Waldron Island	United States	Richard Russell Waldron or Thomas Westbrook Waldron
Wales Island	Canada	William Wales
Ward Hunt Island	Canada	George Ward Hunt
Weddell Island	Falkland Islands	James Weddell
Wellesley Islands	Australia	Richard Wellesley, 1st Marquess Wellesley
Wellington Island	Chile	Arthur Wellesley, 1st Duke of Wellington
Whidbey Island	United States	Joseph Whidbey
Wilson Island	Antarctica	W. Stanley Wilson
Wilson Island	India	Archdale Wilson
Wolf Island	Ecuador	Theodor Wolf
Wolfe Island	Canada	James Wolfe
Wollaston Islands	Chile	William Hyde Wollaston
Woronkofski Island	United States	Lieutenant Woronkovski
Wrangel Island	Russia	Ferdinand von Wrangel
Yakobi Island	United States	Ivan Iakobi
Yos Sudarso Island	Indonesia	Yos Sudarso
Zarembo Island	United States	Dionizy Zaremba
Zavodovski Island	South Georgia and the South Sandwich Islands	Lieutenant Ivan Zavodovski

Former:

- Isla de Apodaca, British Columbia, Canada – Dr. Salvador Apodaca (Bishop of the city of Linares, Nuevo León, Mexico) – now Bowen Island
- Banks Island, Queensland, Australia – Joseph Banks – now Moa Island
- Bedloe's Island, New York, United States – Isaack Bedloo (merchant) – now Liberty Island
- Blackwell's Island, New York, United States – Robert Blackwell – now Roosevelt Island
- Fernando Pó, Equatorial Guinea – Fernão do Pó – now Bioko
- Krusenstern Island, Adam Johann von Krusenstern
- Mulgrave Island, Queensland, Australia – Earl Mulgrave – now Badu Island
- Prince of Wales Isle, Malaysia – George IV, Prince of Wales – now Penang Island
- Queen Charlotte Islands, British Columbia, Canada – Queen Charlotte of Mecklenburg-Strelitz – now Haida Gwaii
- San Cristobal, Solomon Islands – Saint Christopher – now Makira
- Sebald Islands – Sebald de Weert; now Jason Islands
- (United Kingdom) Van Diemen's Land – Anthony van Diemen

== See also ==
- List of eponyms
- List of places named after people
