= Bary Glacier =

Glacier in Antarctica

- Location within South Georgia Island
- Location: South Georgia
- Coordinates: 54°26′S 36°47′W
- Thickness: unknown
- Terminus: Jacobsen Bight
- Status: unknown

Bary Glacier (54°26′S 36°47′W) is a glacier flowing west into Jacobsen Bight, South Georgia, south of Christophersen Glacier. The glacier cuts through the longest sedimentary sequence on the island, from Christophersen Glacier to Cape Darnley. It was named by the UK Antarctic Place-Names Committee in 1982 after Thomas de Bary, one of the first directors of the Compañía Argentina de Pesca from 1904.

== See also ==
- List of glaciers in the Antarctic
- Glaciology
- Retreat of glaciers since 1850
- Glacier mass balance
