= Hantzsch =

Hantzsch is a surname. Notable people with the surname include:

- Arthur Rudolf Hantzsch (1857–1935), German chemist
  - Hantzsch–Widman nomenclature, type of systematic chemical nomenclature for naming heterocyclic parent hydrides
  - Hantzsch pyridine synthesis, multi-component organic reaction between an aldehyde a β-keto ester and a nitrogen donor
  - Hantzsch pyrrole synthesis, the chemical reaction of β-ketoesters with ammonia and α-haloketones to give substituted pyrroles
- Bernhard Hantzsch (1875–1911), German ornithologist, Arctic researcher and writer, who discovered two Icelandic bird subspecies
  - Hantzsch Island, uninhabited island in the Qikiqtaaluk Region of Nunavut, Canada named after Bernhard Hantzsch

== See also ==
- Tzsch
