= Wilson Island =

Wilson Island is the name of several different Islands.

Antarctica

- Wilson Island (Antarctica)

Australia

- Wilson Island (Shark Bay), an island in Western Australia
- Wilson Island (Queensland), an island on the Great Barrier Reef

Bermuda

- Wilson Island, Bermuda

Canada

- Wilson Island (Lake Superior), an island in Lake Superior near Rossport, Ontario owned by the Nature Conservancy of Canada
- Wilson Island (North West Territories), an island in the North West Territories
- Wilson Island (Saskatchewan), an island on the South Saskatchewan River

India

- Wilson Island (Ritchie's Archipelago), an island in the Andaman Sea

United States

- Wilson Island (West Virginia), an island on the Kanawha River in Charleston
