= Hauge Strait =

Hauge Strait (54°28′S 36°53′W) is a strait 3 nautical miles (6 km) wide between Cape Darnley and the northeast end of Hauge Reef, off the south coast of South Georgia. It was surveyed by the South Georgia Survey in the period 1951–57, and was named by the UK Antarctic Place-Names Committee for its association with Hauge Reef.
