= Larvik (disambiguation) =

Larvik may refer to:

== Places ==
- Larvik Municipality, a municipality in Vestfold county, Norway
- Larvik (town), a town within Larvik Municipality in Vestfold county, Norway
- Larvik Cone, a skree cone located between Newark Bay and Jacobsen Bight, on the south coast of the island of South Georgia
- Larvik Harbour, a small bay southwest of Lagrange Peak in southeastern Brabant Island in the Palmer Archipelago, Antarctica
- Lerwick (historically called Larvik), the main town on Shetland

== People ==
- Countship of Larvik, a historic title of nobility based Larvik, Norway

== Religion ==
- Larvik prosti, a geographic deanery of the Church of Norway within the Diocese of Tunsberg
- Larvik prestegjeld, a former geographic subdivision of the Church of Norway in Vestfold county
- Larvik Church, a church in the town of Larvik, Norway

== Sports ==
- Larvik Fotball, an association football club based in Larvik, Norway
- Larvik HK, a handball club based in Larvik, Norway
- Larvik Lions, an American football club based in Larvik, Norway
- Larvik Turn, a sports club based in Larvik, Norway
- IF Fram Larvik, a sports club based in Larvik, Norway

== Transport ==
- Larvik Station, a railway station in the town of Larvik, Norway
