= Hauge Reef =

Coordinates: 54°28′S 36°57′W

Hauge Reef is a chain of islands and rocks extending in an east-northeast direction from the eastern extremity of Annenkov Island to Pillow Rock, a point about 3 nautical miles (6 km) west-southwest of Cape Darnley, South Georgia. It was first charted in 1819 by a Russian expedition under Fabian Gottlieb von Bellingshausen. The reef was surveyed by the South Georgia Survey (SGS), 1951–52, and named for Captain Ole Hauge, of the sealer Albatros, whose knowledge of the coasts of South Georgia was of great assistance to the SGS.

== See also ==
- Hauge Strait
- Low Reef
