= Johnson Point =

Johnson Point may refer to:

- Johnson Point (South Georgia)
- Johnson Point (Thurston County, Washington)
