= Nicholson Island =

Nicholson Island may refer to:

- Nicholson Island (Antarctica), part of the Bailey Rocks, off Antarctica
- Nicholson Island (Lake Ontario) an island in Ontario's Prince Edward County, Canada
- Nicholson Island (Pennsylvania) an island on the Alleghany River, US
- Nicholson Island (Ritchie's Archipelago), Andaman Islands, India
