= Busta Rhymes Island =

Proposed name for an island in Shrewsbury, Massachusetts, US

- Location within Massachusetts Location within the United States
- Etymology: Named after Busta Rhymes

Geography
- Location: Shrewsbury, Massachusetts
- Coordinates: 42.2841441°N 71.7393413°W
- Adjacent to: Mill Pond, Shrewsbury
- Area: 149 m^{2} (1,600 sq ft)
- Length: 12 m (39 ft)
- Width: 12 m (39 ft)

Administration
- United States of America

Demographics
- Population: 0

Additional information
- Time zone: Eastern: UTC−5/−4

Busta Rhymes Island is a proposed name for an otherwise unnamed island in Shrewsbury, Worcester County, Massachusetts, United States. The name refers to the rapper Busta Rhymes. The island is located in Mill Pond in Shrewsbury and measures 40 by 40 feet (12 m × 12 m). The island was named in 2005 by Shrewsbury resident Kevin O'Brien who began frequenting and caring for the upkeep of the island. O'Brien stated he wanted it to be called Busta Rhymes Island as it had "rope-swinging, blueberries, and ... stuff Busta would enjoy."

== Naming ==
O'Brien has attempted to register the name with the United States Board on Geographic Names. However, the name was refused, as the rules require the person commemorated to have been dead for at least five years, and the rapper is still living. O'Brien has since attempted to have the name adopted officially through a rule related to local usage of a name and local geographic activists have named the island on Google Maps. A petition has been created for the board to formally recognize the name.

== In popular culture ==
The island and the campaign to officially name it Busta Rhymes Island was the central topic of an episode of 99% Invisible which explored the naming of places. The island is also included in the book The 99% Invisible City as an example of informal geonyms.

== See also ==
- List of islands named after people
