= Grindal Island =

Island in South Australia, Australia

Coordinates: 34°55′S 136°02′E

Geography
- Location: Spencer Gulf

Administration
- Australia

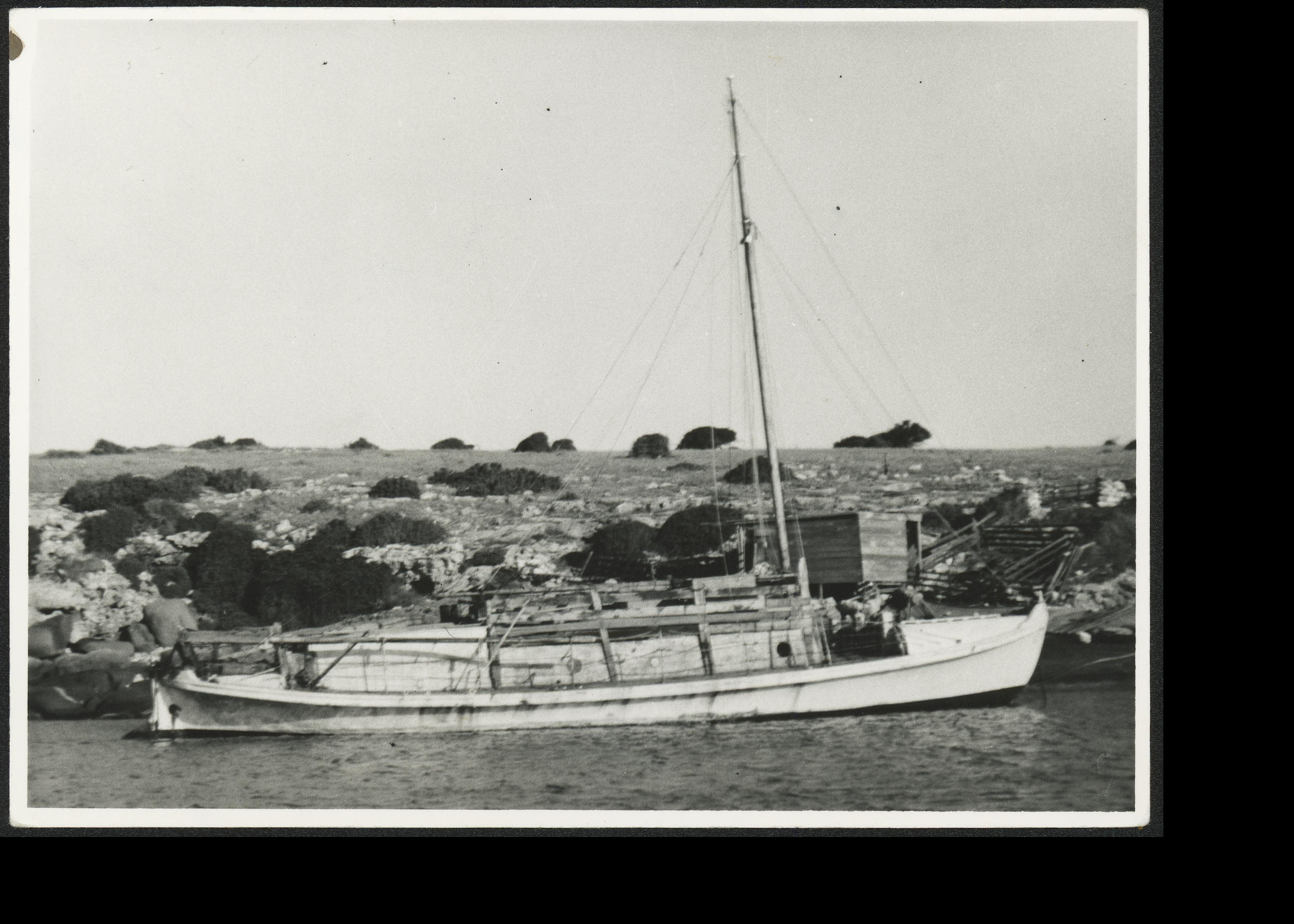
Lifeboat "City of Adelaide" at Grindal Island, South Australia c. 1950. State Library of South Australia B29793.

Grindal Island (also referred to as Garden Island) is a 90-hectare (220-acre) island of the Taylor Islands group, located between the Jussieu Peninsula and Thistle Island near the mouth of Spencer Gulf, South Australia. It was purchased by G. Dorwald in 1895. It has been used for the grazing of sheep. According to Captain R.R. Tapley of the Martindale, in the 1890s the island was home to hundreds of Cape Barren geese. "Buggy wheel tracks" were also visible, which he learnt were actually rat pads. In 1936 he reflected on his experiences 40 years prior, stating: "The rats suddenly disappeared, and have not been seen since. They used to run over everything and everybody at night".
