= Low Reef =

Low Reef (54°30′S 37°0′W) is a reef extending for 1 nautical mile (2 km) from the east end of Annenkov Island, which lies off South Georgia in the South Atlantic. The name "Low Rock" appeared on a 1931 Admiralty chart for the northeastern rock of this reef. The South Georgia Survey, 1956–57, reported that it was the reef which required a name to distinguish it from nearby Hauge Reef.
