= Land grant =

Gift of real estate made by an authority

A land grant is a gift of real estate—land or its use privileges—made by a government or other authority as an incentive, means of enabling works, or as a reward for services to an individual, especially in return for military service. Grants of land are also awarded to individuals and companies as incentives to develop unused land in relatively unpopulated countries; the process of awarding land grants is not limited to the countries named below. The United States historically gave out numerous land grants as homesteads to individuals desiring to make a farm. The American Industrial Revolution was guided by many supportive acts of legislatures (for example, the Main Line of Public Works legislation of 1863) promoting commerce or transportation infrastructure development by private companies, such as the Cumberland Road turnpike, the Lehigh Canal, the Schuylkill Canal and the many railroads that tied the young United States together.

== Nepal ==
In Nepal, a Birta was a historical land grant system where the nobles awarded land grants to individuals on a tax-free basis, primarily as a reward for military and loyalty service during the Shah and Rana regimes. The system originated in the Gorkha Kingdom, where members of the Thar Ghar, an aristocracy system where clans like Aryal, Khanal, Pande, Pant, Bohara who assisted with conquests of unification of Nepal were rewarded with tax-free land. In 1959, Birta Abolition Act converted all Birta holdings into Raikar, a taxable form of private land tenure.

== Ancient Rome ==
Roman soldiers were given pensions (praemia) at the end of their service including cash or land. Augustus fixed the amount in 5 AD at 3,000 denarii, and by the time of Caracalla it had risen to 5,000 denarii. One denarius was roughly equivalent to a day's wages for an unskilled laborer.

== Australia ==
In 1788 the British claimed all of eastern Australia as their own, and formed the colony of New South Wales in Australia. The land was claimed as crown land. Over time, it granted land to officers and released convicts. Males were allowed 30 acres (12 ha), plus 20 acres (8.1 ha) if they were married, and 10 acres (4 ha) additional per child. Instructions were issued on 20 August 1789 that non-commissioned marine officers were to be entitled to 100 acres (40 ha) additional and privates to 50 acres (20 ha) additional.

Governor Macquarie canceled land grants issued during the Rum Rebellion of 1808–09, although some were later restored.

Land grants started to be phased out when private tendering was introduced, and stricter limits were placed on grants without purchase. The instructions to Governor Brisbane were issued on 17 July 1825. From 9 January 1831, all land was to be sold at public auction.

There were also significant land grants in the Swan River Colony (Western Australia), and in Van Diemen's Land (Tasmania) from 1803.

=== Land grant railways ===
- In 1886, the Midland Railway of Western Australia was granted land concessions to build and operate a railway from Midland, near Perth, to Walkaway, near Geraldton. This was built, but taken over by the government railway in the 1950s. It was and is 1,067 mm (3 ft 6 in) gauge.
- In 1889, a land grant railway from Roebuck Bay in Western Australia to Angle Pole in South Australia was proposed. This would have been 1,000 miles (1,600 km) long. Angle Pole was a locality where the telegraph line had a bend in it. It was stillborn. The gauge would have been 1,600 mm (5 ft 3 in).
- In 1897, a transcontinental north–south land grant railway was proposed to complete the missing link between Oodnadatta and Darwin, the latter then called Palmerston or Port Darwin. The plan was abandoned, though the government railway was extended in the 1920s from Oodnadatta to Alice Springs, with similar extensions at the Darwin end. It was originally 1,067 mm (3 ft 6 in) gauge, but was replaced by a new 1,435 mm (4 ft 8 1/2 in) gauge line on a different route.
- In 1909, a land grant railway was proposed in Queensland from Charleville to Point Parker on the shores of the Gulf of Carpentaria, but the plan was abandoned.

== Canada ==
The Hudson's Bay Company was incorporated in 1670 with the grant of Rupert's Land by King Charles II of England; this vast territory was greater than one third the area of Canada today. Following the Rupert's Land Act in the British Parliament, Rupert's Land was sold in 1869 to the newly formed Canadian Government for the nominal sum of £300,000.

Land grants were an incentive for the construction of the Canadian Pacific Railway.

== Ireland ==
The Plantations of Ireland in the 16th and 17th centuries involved the confiscation of some or all the land of Irish lords and its grant to settlers ("planters") from England or Scotland. The English Parliament's Adventurers' Act 1640 and Act for the Settlement of Ireland 1652 specifically entitled "Adventurers" who funded the Cromwellian conquest of Ireland to lands seized from the leaders of the Irish Rebellion of 1641 and the ensuing Confederacy.

== New Zealand ==
In New Zealand two private railway companies were offered land grants to build a railway, though both were eventually taken over by the government and incorporated into the government-owned New Zealand Railways Department.

The Wellington and Manawatu Railway Company built and operated the 134 km Wellington-Manawatu Line north of Wellington to the Manawatu from 1881. The company was New Zealand owned. It was taken over by the government in 1908, and the line became part of the North Island Main Trunk.
The New Zealand Midland Railway Company started the Midland Line between Canterbury and the West Coast in 1886 but the British-owned company was taken over by the government in 1895, having constructed only 131 km of the 376 km route.

Before the provinces were abolished in 1876, some land owned by the Otago Provincial Government was transferred to the University of Otago to retain local ownership.

== United States ==
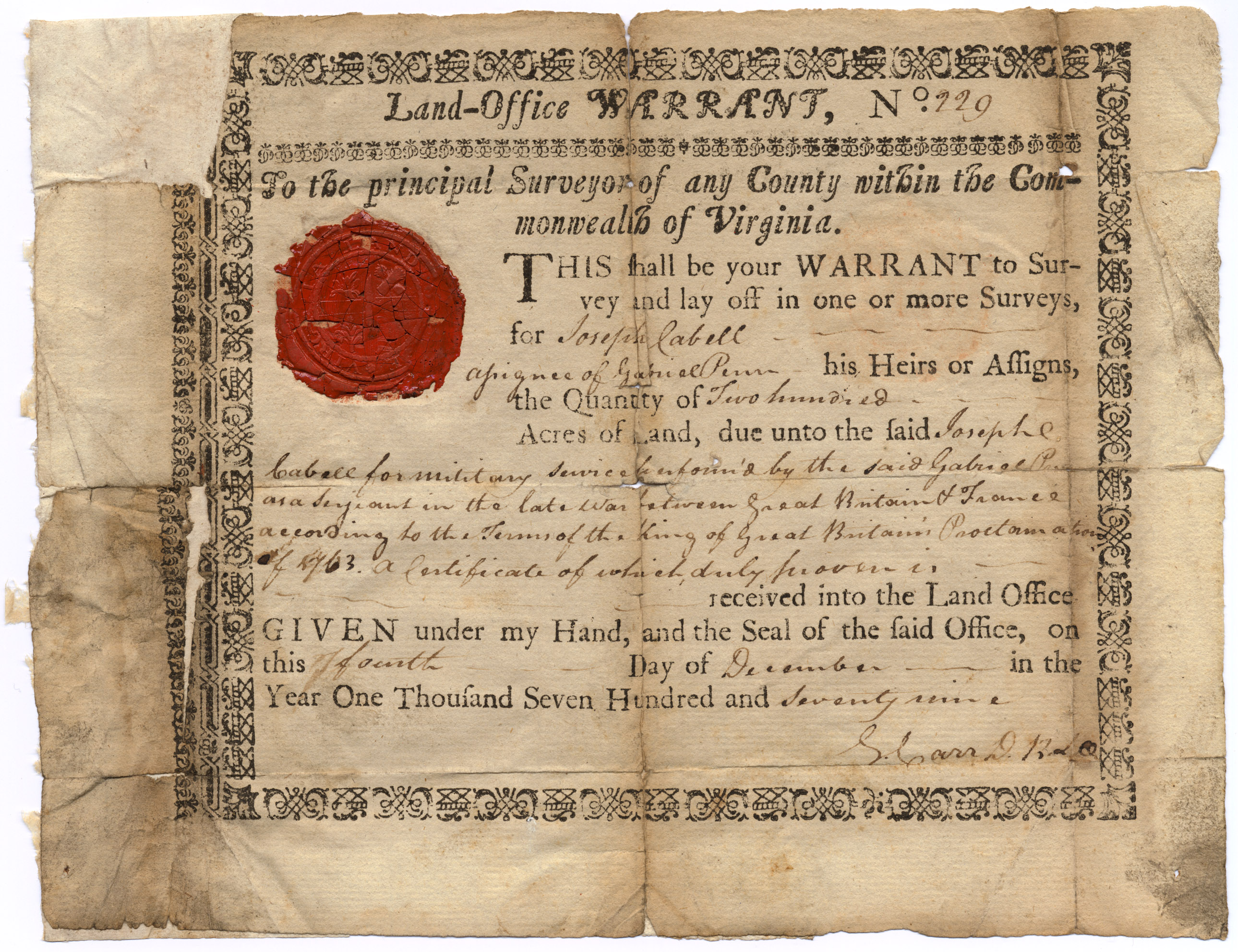
Virginia Land Office warrant issued in 1779 to Joseph Cabell, assignee of Sgt. Gabriel Penn, to receive 200 acres of land in return for Penn's service in the French and Indian War

=== Colonial era ===
==== English land grants ====
During England's colonization of the Americas, the English Crown gave land grants to encourage the foundation of overseas possessions in North America. King James I of England granted a royal charter to the Virginia Company of London, an English joint-stock company founded to colonize Virginia. Similar schemes were later used when royal charters were granted by the Crown to English proprietary colonies in Rhode Island, Connecticut and Pennsylvania. Some settlers were given land grants known as headrights, encouraging them to migrate to North America. Similar systems were used during the Dutch colonization of the Americas.

As English colonial law developed, headrights became patents and a patentee had to improve the land. Under this doctrine of planting and seeding, the patentee was required to cultivate one acre (4,000 m^{2}) of land and build a small house on the property, otherwise the patent would revert to the government.

==== Spanish and Mexican land grants ====
Between 1783 and 1821, Spain offered land grants to anyone who settled in its colonies of Florida and Louisiana. When the United States acquired that land by treaties, it agreed to honor all valid land grants. As a result, years of litigation ensued over the validity of many of the Spanish land grants.

Spain and Mexico used the same system of offering land grants along the Rio Grande River near the Texas/Mexico border. These grants were given to help colonization of the area, initially by the Spanish crown, and later by Mexican authorities nationals, and strengthen frontier towns along the Texas border. During the Mexican period of California (and other portions of Mexican territories inherited from New Spain), the Mexican government granted individuals hundreds of ranchos or large tracts of land. The ranchos established land-use patterns that remain recognizable in the California of today. Controversy over community land grant claims in New Mexico persist to this day.

=== Public lands and bounty-land warrants ===
Future President Thomas Jefferson crafted the Ordinance of 1784, which carved out ten prospective states west of the Appalachian Mountains and established the basis for the Public Land Survey System. The Land Ordinance of 1785 provided a method for settling that land and establishing government institutions, which became federal land policy until 1862. The Northwest Ordinance of 1787 established the Northwest Territory, pursuant to which homesteading settlers could buy land, and certain land was set aside for public schools and other purposes. The federal government acquired additional lands by treaties with various Native American tribes, such as the 1833 Treaty of Chicago, by which many eastern tribes agreed to settle across the Mississippi River. Revenues from public land purchases were a major source of funding for the federal government through the 19th century, along with tariff revenues, since the federal income tax was not established until the 20th century.

Starting with the American Revolutionary War, veterans often received land grants instead of back pay or other remuneration. Bounty-land warrants, often for 160 acres, were issued to veterans from 1775 to 1855, thus including veterans of the American Revolutionary War, the War of 1812 and the Mexican–American War, as well as various Indian wars. The United States Military District in Ohio was created by Congress to reward Revolutionary War veterans with land. The land grants helped settle the Northwest Territory (and later smaller areas, such as the Indiana Territory, the Illinois Territory and the Wisconsin Territory) and as well as the Platte Purchase in Missouri. Eligibility for the warrants expanded over the years through new Congressional acts of 1842, 1850, 1852 and 1855 to the point where they could be sold or given to descendants. The warrant program was discontinued before the American Civil War.

During the 19th century, various states (or even smaller units), as well as the federal government, made extensive land grants to encourage internal improvements, usually to improve transportation, such as construction of bridges and canals. The Land Grant Act of 1850 provided for 3.75 million acres of land to the states to support railroad projects; by 1857 21 million acres of public lands were used for railroads in the Mississippi River valley, and the stage was set for more substantial Congressional subsidies to future railroads. Universities were also beneficiaries of land grants. All five of the transcontinental railroads in the United States were built using land grants.

The Morrill Land-Grant Acts of 1862 and 1890 provided for the establishment of land-grant colleges.

==== Economic impact ====
There is general agreement that the United States' federal policy of offering land grants had a positive impact on economic development in the 19th century.

== See also ==
- Atrisco Land Grant
- Enclosure
- Encomienda
- Fief
- Land patent
- Land reform
- Land-grant university
- Malcolm Ebright
- Maxwell Land Grant
- National Sea Grant College Program
- National Space Grant College and Fellowship Program
- Province of Carolina
- Ranchos of California
- Sangre de Cristo Land Grant
- Tierra Amarilla Land Grant
- United States Court of Private Land Claims
