= Taylor Island =

Island in South Australia, Australia

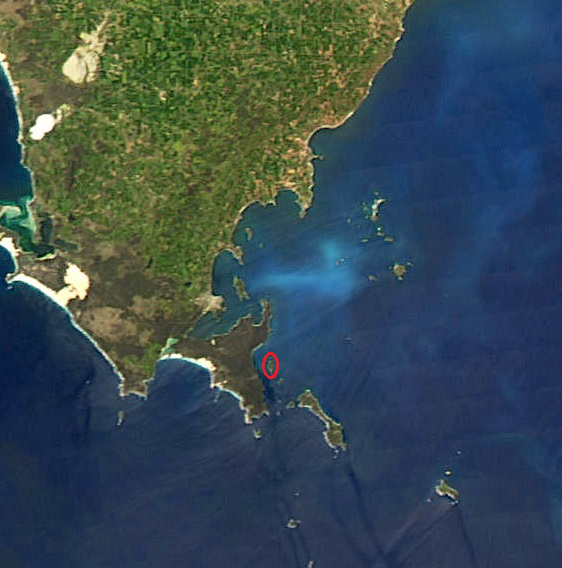
- Location of Taylor Island

- Location in South Australia
- Etymology: William Taylor

Geography
- Location: Spencer Gulf
- Coordinates: 34°52′41″S 136°00′24″E
- Area: 2.4 km^{2} (0.93 sq mi)
- Highest elevation: 84 m (276 ft)

Administration
- Australia

Taylor Island, also known as Taylor's Island, is the largest in a group of seven islands located between the Eyre Peninsula mainland and Thistle Island in the mouth of Spencer Gulf, South Australia. Taylor's Island has been used principally for the grazing of sheep, while its surrounding waters are well regarded fishing grounds.

== History ==
The island was named by British explorer Matthew Flinders in 1802, after the loss of William Taylor, a midshipman and master's mate to John Thistle (after whom Thistle Island is named).

In 1876, a sporting party described Taylor Island as being "covered with rabbits, mutton birds, and Cape Barren geese."

In 1910, a trawling expedition from Largs Bay to Venus Bay on the west coast of Eyre Peninsula was abandoned after the steamer Argyle was met with high seas in the Investigator Strait. At one stage there was 7 ft (2.1 m) of water in the well, and the ship's hand pump couldn't improve the situation. Water came within 3 in (76 mm) of the furnaces, and the engineers and the firemen were working in waist-deep water. By the vessel's continual rolling motion, coal was also washed out of the bunkers and into the bilges. The coal had to be fished out of the water by hand to feed the furnaces. As the coal had about 5 ft (1.5 m) of water over it, the work was tedious and difficult. The crews worked with buckets and hand-pumps and gradually reduced the quantity of water in the vessel. Owing to the continuous strain, all on board became exhausted. After the ordeal, the ship anchored at Taylor's Island for five days, while the crew made necessary repairs.

In 1935, grazier Clarence Henry Lines was accused of stealing twenty sheep from fellow grazier R. L. C. Sinclair and five from P. S. Sinclair. The allegedly "stolen" sheep were found grazing on Taylor Island. Lines denied having stolen the sheep and pleaded "not guilty" in court.

In 1940, the growth of feed for the grazing of sheep made Taylor Island "a sight to be seen".

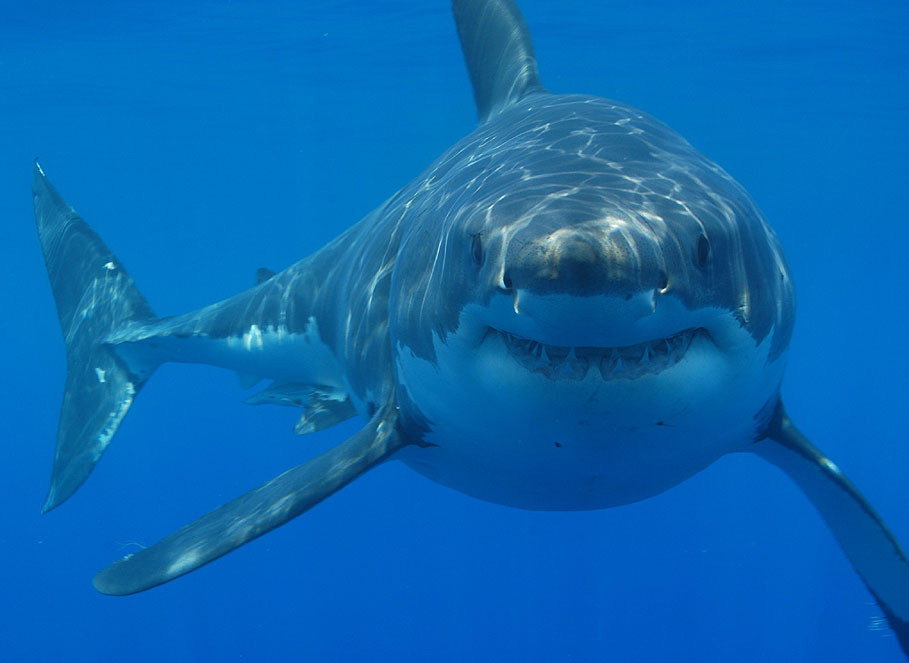
A great white shark

In 1947, Norm Johnson caught an unusually large snook off Taylor Island. It was 3 ft 3 inches in length, 10 inches in girth and weighed over 7 lbs.

In March 1950, first-time big game fisherman Mr. A. Dean of Mildura hooked four great white sharks near Taylor Island. He only succeeded in landing one, which measured 11 ft. 5 inches. Its girth was 6 ft and it weighed 860 lb. Another escaped after a 30-minute struggle and was estimated to be 14 ft long.

As of 1996, Taylor Island was under perpetual lease, and was still used for minor grazing. As of March 2025, Ray Watherston's family had farmed sheep on the island for more than 60 years.

In March 2025, there were 550 sheep on the island. After a year in which the island only received 160mm of rain (compared to the average 380–400mm), 12,000 litres of water from the mainland was delivered to the island by a 51-year-old restored tuna fishing boat called Tacoma. The boat had also been used for taking wool to the mainland since around 2015, and was maintained by the Tacoma Preservation Society.

== Geography ==
Taylor's Island is the largest in a group of seven islands located between the Eyre Peninsula mainland and Thistle Island in the mouth of Spencer Gulf, South Australia. Other islands in the group were also named after lost members of Flinders' expedition: Little Island, Lewis Island, Smith Island, Hopkins Island and Grindal Island.

There are some freshwater springs on the island.

== Navigation aids ==
A navigation aid consisting of a 9-metre-high (30 ft) tower with a single flashing light was installed in 1982. The light, which is 76 m (249 ft) above sea level, assists vessel underway at night along the east coast of the Jussieu Peninsula, particularly those vessels that approaching from the south via the Thorny Passage or the east coast of Thistle Island.

== Flora and fauna ==
Plants recorded on Taylor Island include: dryland tea-tree (Melaleuca lanceolata), coastal white mallee (Eucalyptus diversifolia), nitre bush, pointed twinleaf, native juniper, kangaroo thorn, dysentery bush, old man's beard, yorrell, native lilac, weeping pittosporum and cockie's tongue. Western grey kangaroos were introduced to the island, but Brush-tailed possums are native there. Birds include brown falcon, grey fantail, golden whistler and Richard's pipit. Rosenberg's goanna lives on the island.

== See also ==
- Owen Island, also known as Little Taylor Island
