= Tanner Island =

Island in the Pickersgill Islands

Tanner Island (54°38′S 36°46′W) is the westernmost and largest of the Pickersgill Islands, rising to 145m off the south coast of South Georgia. Named by United Kingdom Antarctic Place-Names Committee (UK-APC) for Dr. P. W. G. Tanner, a British Antarctic Survey (BAS) geologist who worked on the island during the 1975-76 field season.

== See also ==
- List of Antarctic and sub-Antarctic islands
