= Allen Island, Queensland =

Island in Queensland, Australia

Coordinates: 17°01′49″S 139°13′45″E

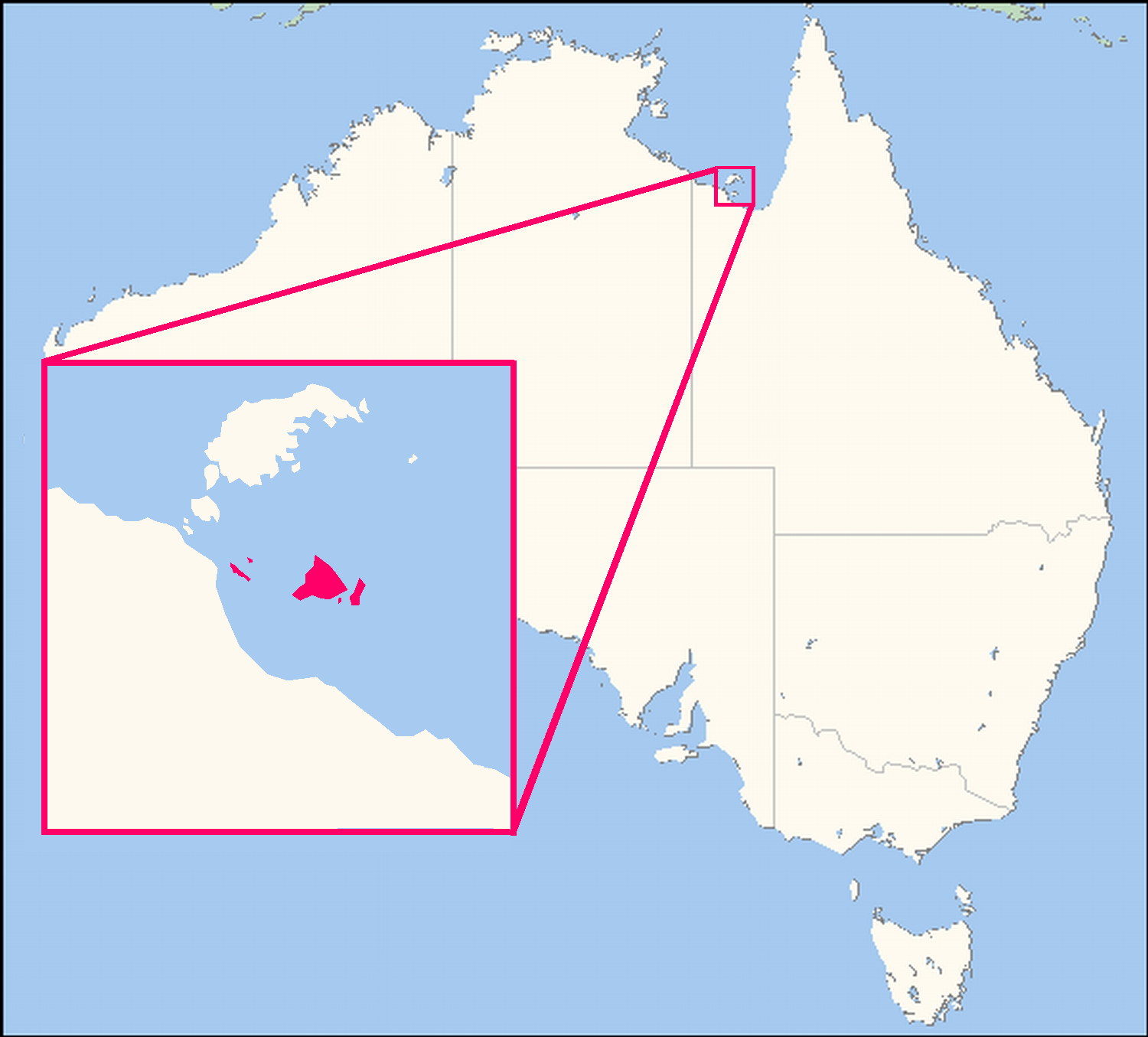
Location map of the South Wellesley Islands

Allen Island, also known as Allens Island or Allen's Island, is one of the South Wellesley Islands, in Queensland's Gulf of Carpentaria. It was named by Matthew Flinders after John Allen, a Derbyshire miner who was a member of the party of naturalists that accompanied the 1801–1803 voyage of HMS Investigator under Flinders. Flinders landed a party of botanists on the island on 20 November 1802 to search for plants.

It is notable for being directly east of Point Parker, the proposed northern terminus of a still-born land grant railway from Charleville. Point Parker, though a prominent feature, is not always labelled on maps.
