= Cape Lyon =

Coordinates: 69.8338°N 122.9546°W

Cape Lyon is located in the Northwest Territories, Canada, within Darnley Bay, 14 miles (23 km) from Clapperton Island. The cape was named in honor of Captain George Francis Lyon, R.N. by John Franklin. The topography presents with gently swelling eminences, covered with a grassy sward, and intersected by several narrow ridges of rocks, rising about 150 feet (46 m). The coast ridges form high cliffs. Clay-slate and limestone lie in nearly horizontal strata beneath them. The view inland terminates with the Melville Range.
