= Christophersen Glacier =

Glacier in Antarctica

- Location within South Georgia Island
- Location: South Georgia
- Coordinates: 54°25′S 36°47′W
- Length: 8 nmi (15 km; 9 mi)
- Thickness: unknown
- Terminus: Jacobsen Bight
- Status: unknown

Christophersen Glacier (54°25′S 36°47′W) is a glacier 8 nautical miles (15 km) long, flowing west into Jacobsen Bight on the south coast of South Georgia. It was surveyed by the South Georgia Survey in the period 1951–57, and named by the UK Antarctic Place-Names Committee for Pedro Christophersen, one of the first Directors of the Compañía Argentina de Pesca which operated the Grytviken whaling station for more than 50 years beginning in 1904.

== See also ==
- List of glaciers in the Antarctic
- Glaciology
