= Fraser Island, Nunavut =

Uninhabited island in the Qikiqtaaluk Region, Nunavut, Canada

Fraser Island
- Location within Nunavut Location within Canada

Geography
- Location: Hudson Bay
- Coordinates: 63°29′N 78°30′W
- Archipelago: Arctic Archipelago
- Area: 55 km^{2} (21 sq mi)

Administration
- Canada
- Territory: Nunavut
- Region: Qikiqtaaluk

Demographics
- Population: Uninhabited

Fraser Island is an uninhabited island in the Qikiqtaaluk Region of Nunavut, Canada. It is located at the mouth of Hudson Bay off Nottingham Island's northwestern tip. The closest community is the Inuit hamlet of Kinngait, 120 km (75 mi) to the northeast on Baffin Island.

== Geography ==
The island's habitat is characterized by tundra, inlets, coastal marine features, coastal cliffs, and rocky marine shores.

== Fauna ==
Fraser Island is a Canadian Important Bird Area (#NU024), as well as a Key Migratory Bird Terrestrial Habitat site (NU Site 46). Notable bird species include common eider as well as colonies of water birds / seabirds.

== History ==
In 1965, the island, previously unnamed by Europeans, was called Fraser Island in honour of Robert James Fraser (1887–1965), first hydrographer of Canada.
