= John Allen (miner) =

English lead miner aboard HMS Investigator

John Allen (born 7 May 1775; date of death unknown) was a lead miner, notable as a junior member of the party of naturalists that accompanied the 1801–1803 voyage of HMS Investigator under Matthew Flinders.

== Early life ==
Born in Ashover, Derbyshire on 7 May 1775, John Allen was the sixth of ten children of lead miner James Allen and his wife Elizabeth née Boome. The Allens lived in a cottage at Overton, and James Allen was employed nearby at the Gregory Mine. John Allen apparently began working at the mine at the age of twelve, initially cleaning flues, and probably later becoming a labourer in the cope gang led by his eldest brother James. Not much else is known of his early life, but the fact that he could write quite well suggests that he was unusually well educated in literacy for a lead miner.

== Appointed to H.M.S. Investigator ==
In 1801, the British Admiralty decided to mount an expedition to survey New Holland (that is, western parts of Australia) and New South Wales (eastern parts of Australia), to determine whether these were parts of a single land mass, and to search for river systems that might offer access to the interior. The expedition was also to carry a full complement of naturalists, including a mineralogist and, to assist him, a "practical miner". Sir Joseph Banks was given the authority to select naturalists for the voyage, and seems not to have sought a mineralogist. Instead, he wrote to his uncle, William Milnes, who managed his estate at Overton, asking him to find "a person who engages in the mineral line". The first person Milnes engaged later pulled out, and Milnes subsequently selected Allen for the position. Writing to notify Banks of his choice on 4 February 1801, Milnes described Allen as "... a young man a neighbour whose name is John Allen and who is an ingenious Lad and understands blasting and boring and likewise the nature and construction of Engines—upon ye whole he is I am certain the very man for your office...."

Allen signed his employment contract in the presence of Banks on 29 April 1801, together with the other members of the party of naturalists: Robert Brown, naturalist; Ferdinand Bauer, natural history artist; William Westall, landscape artist; and Peter Good, horticulturist. Allen was to answer to Brown, would receive an annual salary of £100, and was messed and accommodated with the warrant officers. However the Investigator ended up carrying no warrant officers, so Allen was permitted to mess with the officers. Two unoccupied cabins in the cockpit ended up being allocated to Allen and Good.

== Voyage ==
After stopping at Madeira and the Cape Colony, the Investigator reached Australia in December 1801. It sailed along the south coast, through Bass Strait, and north along the east coast to overwinter at Port Jackson. It then sailed north up the east coast, rounding the Cape York Peninsula and entering the Gulf of Carpentaria. The ship by then being in extremely poor condition, the survey was broken off and the Investigator was sailed to Koepang, Timor. Many members of the crew became sick with dysentery there, and Flinders took the decision to return to Port Jackson as quickly as possible. They sailed southwards well west of the west coast of Australia, then east along the south coast, arriving back at Port Jackson in June 1802. The Investigator was condemned, and Flinders sailed for England as passenger on the Porpoise, there to ask for a new ship. Though initially inclined to remain at Port Jackson with some of the other naturalists, ultimately Allen chose to board the Porpoise. On 17 August the Porpoise was wrecked on Wreck Reef. Everyone on board was marooned on a sandbank for six weeks while Flinders sailed the ship's cutter back to Port Jackson to seek help. When help arrived it was in the form of two ships, one of which would return to Port Jackson, while the other was en route to China. Allen elected to sail to China. From there he took a passage to England on the Henry Addington. Arriving at Brighton on 8 August 1804, Allen made his way to London, where he gave to Banks the first eye-witness account of the voyage, including breaking the news of the death at Port Jackson of the gardener Peter Good.

== Later life ==
Nothing is known of Allen's later life except that Flinders records having received a visit from him in 1810. Flinders had only just returned to England at the time, and was staying at his sister's house in Boston.

== Legacy ==
It is impossible to gauge the importance of Allen's work on the Investigator voyage, because, as assistant to more senior naturalists, he did not receive scientific credit for his collections; and Brown paid little attention to geology anyhow, having been instructed by Banks that "Geology Mineralogy must be considered by you as subsidiary pursuits & you will be required to do in them no more than is compatible with a full attention to Botany Entomology Ornithology etc." Brown, who could be extremely acerbic at times, wrote to Banks that Allen was "really of very little use".

Flinders named Allen Island in the South Wellesley Islands of the Gulf of Carpentaria, Queensland, in Allen's honour.
