= List of birds of Iceland =

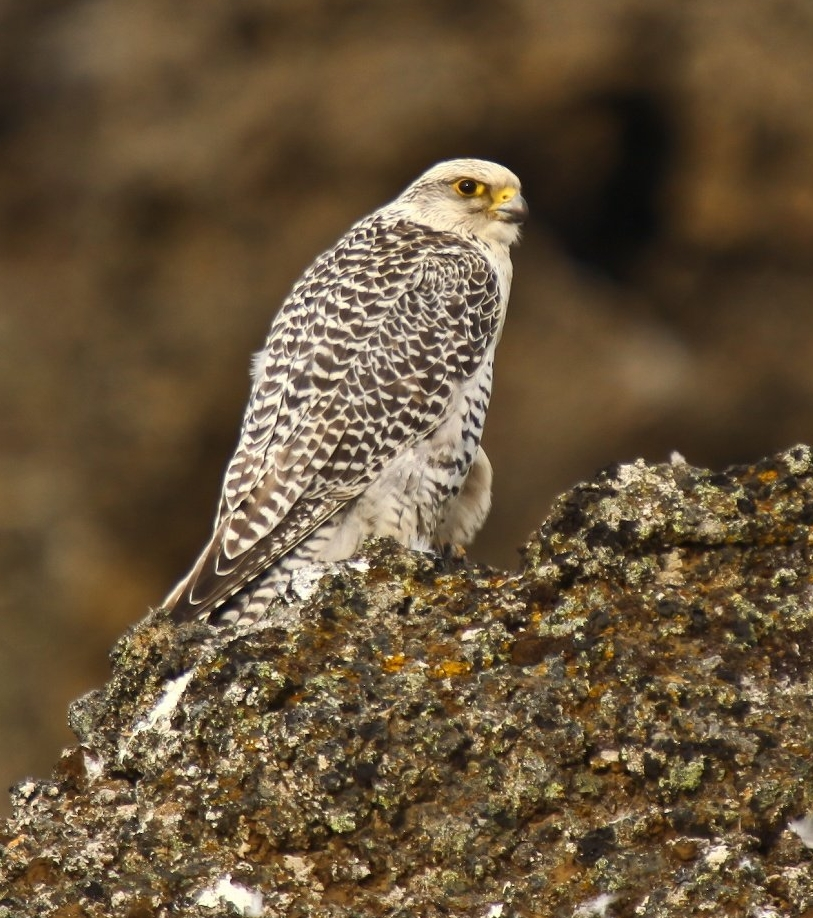
The gyrfalcon is the national bird and animal of Iceland.

This is a list of the bird species recorded in Iceland. The avifauna of Iceland included a total of 388 confirmed species, as of the end of 2011 according to the Icelandic Birding Pages (IBP), with some updates to September 2017. The entire populations of two species have resulted from introductions by humans, and a few other species have individuals of both natural and human-assisted origin. One species on the list is extinct.

This list's taxonomic treatment (sequence of orders, families and species) are those of the IOC World Bird List, 2011 edition, with nomenclature (scientific names) updated to the 2025 edition.

The following tags have been used to highlight some categories of occurrence.

- (A) Accidental – a species that rarely or accidentally occurs in Iceland
- (C) Introduced – a species introduced to Iceland as a consequence, direct or indirect, of human actions, and has become established

== Ducks, geese, and waterfowl ==
Order: Anseriformes Family: Anatidae

Anatidae includes the ducks and most duck-like waterfowl, such as geese and swans. These birds are adapted to an aquatic existence with webbed feet, flattened bills, and feathers that are excellent at shedding water due to an oily coating.

- Mute swan, Hnúðsvanur Cygnus olor (A C)
- Tundra swan, Dvergsvanur Cygnus columbianus (A)
- Whooper swan, Álft Cygnus cygnus
- Bean goose, Akurgæs Anser fabalis (A)
- Pink-footed goose, Heiðagæs Anser brachyrhynchus
- Greater white-fronted goose, Blesgæs Anser albifrons
- Greylag goose, Grágæs Anser anser
- Snow goose, Snjógæs Anser caerulescens (A)
- Canada goose, Kanadagæs Branta canadensis (A)
- Cackling goose, Alaskagæs Branta hutchinsii (A)
- Barnacle goose, Helsingi Branta leucopsis
- Brent goose, Margæs Branta bernicla
- Red-breasted goose, Fagurgæs Branta ruficollis (A)
- Ruddy shelduck, Ryðönd Tadorna ferruginea (A)
- Common shelduck, Brandönd Tadorna tadorna (A)
- Wood duck, Brúðönd Aix sponsa (A)
- Mandarin duck, Mandarínönd Aix galericulata (A) (I)
- Eurasian wigeon, Rauðhöfðaönd Mareca penelope
- American wigeon, Ljóshöfðaönd Mareca americana (A)
- Gadwall, Gargönd Mareca strepera
- Eurasian teal, Urtönd Anas crecca
- Green-winged teal, Rákönd Anas carolinensis
- Mallard, Stokkönd Anas platyrhynchos
- American black duck, Brúnönd Anas rubripes (A)
- Northern pintail, Grafönd Anas acuta
- Garganey, Taumönd Spatula querquedula (A)
- Blue-winged teal, Bláönd Spatula discors (A)
- Northern shoveler, Skeiðönd Spatula clypeata (A)
- Canvasback, Dúkönd Aythya valisineria (A)
- Common pochard, Skutulönd Aythya ferina (A)
- Redhead, Kollönd Aythya americana (A)
- Ring-necked duck, Hringönd Aythya collaris (A)
- Tufted duck, Skúfönd Aythya fuligula
- Greater scaup, Duggönd Aythya marila
- Lesser scaup, Kúfönd Aythya affinis (A)
- Common eider, Æðarfugl Somateria mollissima
- King eider, Æðarkóngur Somateria spectabilis (A)
- Steller's eider, Blikönd Polysticta stelleri (A)
- Harlequin duck, Straumönd Histrionicus histrionicus
- Long-tailed duck, Hávella Clangula hyemalis
- Common scoter, Hrafnsönd Melanitta nigra
- Surf scoter, Krákönd Melanitta perspicillata (A)
- Velvet scoter, Korpönd Melanitta fusca (A)
- White-winged scoter, Kolönd Melanitta deglandi (A)
- Stejneger's scoter, Melanitta stejnegeri (A)
- Bufflehead, Hjálmönd Bucephala albeola (A)
- Barrow's goldeneye, Húsönd Bucephala islandica
- Common goldeneye, Hvinönd Bucephala clangula (A)
- Smew, Hvítönd Mergellus albellus (A)
- Hooded merganser, Kambönd Lophodytes cucullatus (A)
- Red-breasted merganser, Toppönd Mergus serrator
- Goosander, Gulönd Mergus merganser
- Ruddy duck, Hrókönd Oxyura jamaicensis (A, C)

== Pheasants, grouse, and allies ==
Order: Galliformes Family: Phasianidae

These are terrestrial species of gamebirds, feeding and nesting on the ground. They are variable in size but generally plump, with broad and relatively short wings.

- Rock ptarmigan, Rjúpa Lagopus muta
- Common quail, Kornhæna Coturnix coturnix (A)

== Divers ==
Order: Gaviiformes Family: Gaviidae

Divers, also called loons in North America, are a group of aquatic birds found in many parts of northern Eurasia and North America. They are the size of a large duck or small goose, which they somewhat resemble in shape when swimming, but to which they are completely unrelated. In particular, their legs are set very far back which assists swimming underwater but makes walking on land extremely difficult.

- Red-throated diver, Lómur Gavia stellata
- Great northern diver, Himbrimi Gavia immer
- White-billed diver, Svalbrúsi Gavia adamsii (A)

== Grebes ==
Order: Podicipediformes Family: Podicipedidae

Grebes are small to medium-large freshwater diving birds. They have lobed toes and are excellent swimmers and divers. However, they have their feet placed far back on the body, making them quite ungainly on land.

- Pied-billed grebe, Stúfgoði Podilymbus podiceps (A)
- Little grebe, Dverggoði Tachybaptus ruficollis (A)
- Great crested grebe, Toppgoði Podiceps cristatus (A)
- Red-necked grebe, Sefgoði Podiceps grisegena (A)
- Slavonian grebe, Flórgoði Podiceps auritus

== Albatrosses ==
Order: Procellariiformes Family: Diomedeidae

The albatrosses are among the largest of flying birds, and the great albatrosses of the genus Diomedea have the largest wingspans of any extant birds.

- Black-browed albatross, Svaltrosi Thalassarche melanophris (A)

== Shearwaters and petrels ==
Order: Procellariiformes Family: Procellariidae

The procellariids are the main group of medium-sized shearwaters and petrels, characterised by united nostrils with medium septum and a long outer functional primary.

- Northern fulmar, Fýll Fulmarus glacialis
- Great shearwater, Hettuskrofa Ardenna gravis (A)
- Sooty shearwater, Gráskrofa Ardenna griseus (A)
- Manx shearwater, Skrofa Puffinus puffinus

== Southern storm petrels ==
Order: Procellariiformes Family: Oceanitidae

The southern storm petrels are relatives of the petrels and are the smallest seabirds. They feed on planktonic crustaceans and small fish picked from the surface, typically while hovering.

- Wilson's storm petrel, Hafsvala Oceanites oceanicus (A)

== Northern storm petrels ==
Order: Procellariiformes Family: Hydrobatidae

Though the members of this family are similar in many respects to the southern storm-petrels, including their general appearance and habits, there are enough genetic differences to warrant their placement in a separate family.

- European storm petrel, Stormsvala Hydrobates pelagicus
- Leach's storm petrel, Sjósvala Hydrobates leucorhous

== Boobies and gannets ==
Order: Suliformes Family: Sulidae

The sulids comprise the gannets and boobies. Both groups are medium-large coastal seabirds that plunge-dive for fish.

- Northern gannet, Súla Morus bassanus

== Cormorants and shags ==
Order: Suliformes Family: Phalacrocoracidae

Cormorants and shags are medium-to-large aquatic birds, usually with mainly dark plumage and areas of coloured skin on the face. The bill is long, thin and sharply hooked. Their feet are four-toed and webbed.

- Great cormorant, Dílaskarfur Phalacrocorax carbo
- European shag, Toppskarfur Gulosus aristotelis

== Herons, egrets, and bitterns ==
Order: Pelecaniformes Family: Ardeidae

The family Ardeidae contains the herons, egrets, and bitterns. Herons and egrets are medium to large wading birds with long necks and legs. Bitterns tend to be shorter necked and more secretive. Members of Ardeidae fly with their necks retracted, unlike other long-necked birds such as storks, ibises and spoonbills.

- Great bittern, Sefþvari Botaurus stellaris (A)
- American bittern, Reyrþvari Botaurus lentiginosus (A)
- Least bittern, Rengluþvari Ixobrychus exilis (A)
- Little bittern, Rindilþvari Ixobrychus minutus (A)
- Black-crowned night heron, Nátthegri Nycticorax nycticorax (A)
- Green heron, Grænhegri Butorides virescens (A)
- Squacco heron, Relluhegri Ardeola ralloides (A)
- Cattle egret, Kúhegri Bubulcus ibis (A)
- Snowy egret, Ljómahegri Egretta thula (A)
- Little egret, Bjarthegri Egretta garzetta (A)
- Great white egret, Mjallhegri Ardea alba (A)
- Grey heron, Gráhegri Ardea cinerea (A)
- Great blue heron, Bláhegri Ardea herodias (A)
- Purple heron, Rauðhegri Ardea purpurea (A)

== Ibises and spoonbills ==
Order: Pelecaniformes Family: Threskiornithidae

The family Threskiornithidae includes the ibises and spoonbills. They have long, broad wings. Their bodies tend to be elongated, the neck more so, with rather long legs. The bill is also long, decurved in the case of the ibises, straight and distinctively flattened in the spoonbills.

- Glossy ibis, Bognefur Plegadis falcinellus (A)
- Eurasian spoonbill, Flatnefur Platalea leucorodia (A)

== Storks ==
Order: Ciconiiformes Family: Ciconiidae

Storks are large, long-legged, long-necked, wading birds with long, stout bills. Storks are mute, but bill-clattering is an important mode of communication at the nest. Their nests can be large and may be reused for many years. Many species are migratory.

- Black stork, Kolstorkur Ciconia nigra (A)
- White stork, Hvítstorkur Ciconia ciconia (A)

== Hawks, eagles, and kites ==
Order: Accipitriformes Family: Accipitridae

Accipitridae is a family of birds of prey and includes hawks, eagles, kites, harriers, and Old World vultures. These birds have very large powerful hooked beaks for tearing flesh from their prey, strong legs, powerful talons, and keen eyesight.

- European honey-buzzard, Býþjór Pernis apivorus (A)
- Black kite, Vatnagleða Milvus migrans (A)
- Red kite, Svölugleða Milvus milvus (A)
- White-tailed eagle, Haförn Haliaeetus albicilla
- Eurasian marsh harrier, Brúnheiðir Circus aeruginosus (A)
- Hen harrier, Bláheiðir Circus cyaneus (A)
- Pallid harrier, Fölheiðir Circus macrourus (A)
- Montagu's harrier, Gráheiðir Circus pygargus (A)
- Eurasian sparrowhawk, Sparrhaukur Accipiter nisus (A)
- Common buzzard, Músvákur Buteo buteo (A)
- Rough-legged buzzard, Fjallvákur Buteo lagopus (A)
- Booted eagle, Skálmörn Hieraaetus pennatus (A)

== Osprey ==
Order: Accipitriformes Family: Pandionidae

Pandionidae is a family of fish-eating birds of prey, possessing a very large, powerful hooked beak for tearing flesh from their prey, strong legs, powerful talons, and keen eyesight. The family is monotypic.

- Osprey, Gjóður Pandion haliaetus (A)

== Falcons ==
Order: Falconiformes Family: Falconidae

Falconidae is a family of diurnal birds of prey. They differ from hawks, eagles and kites in that they kill with their beaks instead of their talons.

- Common kestrel, Turnfálki Falco tinnunculus (A)
- Red-footed falcon, Kvöldfálki Falco vespertinus (A)
- Merlin, Smyrill Falco columbarius
- Eurasian hobby, Gunnfálki Falco subbuteo (A)
- Gyrfalcon, Fálki Falco rusticolus
- Peregrine falcon, Förufálki Falco peregrinus (A)

== Rails, gallinules, and coots ==
Order: Gruiformes Family: Rallidae

Rallidae is a large family of small to medium-sized birds which includes the rails, crakes, coots, and gallinules. Typically they inhabit dense vegetation in damp environments near lakes, swamps, or rivers. In general they are shy and secretive birds, making them difficult to observe. Most species have strong legs and long toes which are well adapted to soft uneven surfaces. They tend to have short, rounded wings and to be weak fliers.

- Water rail, Keldusvín Rallus aquaticus (A)
- Spotted crake, Dílarella Porzana porzana (A)
- Sora, Sorarella Porzana carolina (A)
- Corn crake, Engirella Crex crex (A)
- Eurasian moorhen, Sefhæna Gallinula chloropus (A)
- Purple gallinule, Flóðhæna Porphyrio martinicus (A)
- Eurasian coot, Bleshæna Fulica atra (A)
- American coot, Kolhæna Fulica americana (A)

== Cranes ==
Order: Gruiformes Family: Gruidae

Cranes are large, long-legged, and long-necked birds. Unlike the similar-looking but unrelated herons, cranes fly with necks outstretched, not pulled back. Most have elaborate and noisy courting displays or "dances".

- Common crane, Grátrana Grus grus (A)

== Oystercatchers ==
Order: Charadriiformes Family: Haematopodidae

The oystercatchers are large and noisy plover-like birds, with strong bills used for smashing or prising open molluscs.

- Eurasian oystercatcher, Tjaldur Haematopus ostralegus

== Stilts and avocets ==
Order: Charadriiformes Family: Recurvirostridae

Recurvirostridae is a family of large wading birds which includes the avocets and stilts. The avocets have long legs and long up-curved bills. The stilts have extremely long legs and long, thin, straight bills.

- Pied avocet, Bjúgnefja Recurvirostra avosetta (A)

== Stone-curlews ==
Order: Charadriiformes Family: Burhinidae

The stone-curlews and thick-knees are a group of waders found worldwide within the tropical zone, with some species also breeding in temperate Europe and Australia. They are medium to large waders with strong black or yellow-black bills, large yellow eyes, and cryptic plumage. Despite being classed as waders, most species have a preference for arid or semi-arid habitats.

- Eurasian stone-curlew, Tríll Burhinus oedicnemus (A)

== Pratincoles and coursers ==
Order: Charadriiformes Family: Glareolidae

Glareolidae is a family of wading birds comprising the pratincoles, which have short legs, long pointed wings, and long forked tails, and the coursers, which have long legs, short wings, and long, pointed bills which curve downwards.

- Collared pratincole, Þernutrítill Glareola pratincola (A)
- Black-winged pratincole, Stepputrítill Glareola nordmanni (A)

== Plovers and lapwings ==
Order: Charadriiformes Family: Charadriidae

The family Charadriidae includes the plovers, dotterels, and lapwings. They are small to medium-sized birds with compact bodies, short thick necks, and long, usually pointed, wings. They are found in open country worldwide, mostly in habitats near water.

- Common ringed plover, Sandlóa Charadrius hiaticula
- Semipalmated plover, Kvöldlóa Charadrius semipalmatus
- Killdeer, Skræklóa Charadrius vociferus (A)
- Greater sand plover, Auðnalóa Charadrius leschenaultii (A)
- Eurasian dotterel, Fjalllóa Charadrius morinellus (A)
- Pacific golden plover, Glitlóa Pluvialis fulva (A)
- American golden plover, Gulllóa Pluvialis dominica (A)
- European golden plover, Heiðlóa Pluvialis apricaria
- Grey plover, Grálóa Pluvialis squatarola (A)
- Northern lapwing, Vepja Vanellus vanellus (A)

== Sandpipers and allies ==
Order: Charadriiformes Family: Scolopacidae

Scolopacidae is a large diverse family of small to medium-sized shorebirds including the sandpipers, curlews, godwits, shanks, woodcocks, snipes, dowitchers, and phalaropes. The majority of these species eat small invertebrates picked out of the mud or soil. Variation in length of legs and bills enables multiple species to feed in the same habitat, particularly on the coast, without direct competition for food.

- Red knot, Rauðbrystingur Calidris canutus
- Sanderling, Sanderla Calidris alba
- Semipalmated sandpiper, Fitjatíta Calidris pusilla (A)
- Western sandpiper, Hólmatíta Calidris mauri (A)
- Little stint, Veimiltíta Calidris minuta (A)
- Temminck's stint, Bakkatíta Calidris temminckii (A)
- Least sandpiper, Mærutíta Calidris minutilla (A)
- White-rumped sandpiper, Vaðlatíta Calidris fuscicollis (A)
- Baird's sandpiper, Leirutíta Calidris bairdii (A)
- Pectoral sandpiper, Rákatíta Calidris melanotos (A)
- Curlew sandpiper, Spóatíta Calidris ferruginea (A)
- Purple sandpiper, Sendlingur Calidris maritima
- Dunlin, Lóuþræll Calidris alpina
- Stilt sandpiper, Vaðfæla Calidris himantopus (A)
- Broad-billed sandpiper, Efjutíta Calidris falcinellus (A)
- Buff-breasted sandpiper, Grastíta Calidris subruficollis (A)
- Ruff, Rúkragi Calidris pugnax (A)
- Jack snipe, Dvergsnípa Lymnocryptes minimus (A)
- Common snipe, Hrossagaukur Gallinago gallinago
- Wilson's snipe, Flóasnípa Gallinago delicata (A)
- Short-billed dowitcher, Snípuduðra Limnodromus griseus (A)
- Long-billed dowitcher, Kanaduðra Limnodromus scolopaceus (A)
- Eurasian woodcock, Skógarsnípa Scolopax rusticola (A)
- Black-tailed godwit, Jaðrakan Limosa limosa
- Bar-tailed godwit, Lappajaðrakan Limosa lapponica (A)
- Eurasian whimbrel, Spói Numenius phaeopus
- Eurasian curlew, Fjöruspói Numenius arquata (A)
- Upland sandpiper, Sléttulæpa Bartramia longicauda (A)
- Common sandpiper, Lindastelkur Actitis hypoleucos (A)
- Spotted sandpiper, Dílastelkur Actitis macularia (A)
- Green sandpiper, Trjástelkur Tringa ochropus (A)
- Solitary sandpiper, Svölustelkur Tringa solitaria (A)
- Spotted redshank, Sótstelkur Tringa erythropus (A)
- Greater yellowlegs, Mosastelkur Tringa melanoleuca (A)
- Common greenshank, Lyngstelkur Tringa nebularia (A)
- Lesser yellowlegs, Hrísastelkur Tringa flavipes (A)
- Wood sandpiper, Flóastelkur Tringa glareola (A)
- Common redshank, Stelkur Tringa totanus
- Ruddy turnstone, Tildra Arenaria interpres
- Wilson's phalarope, Freyshani Phalaropus tricolor (A)
- Red-necked phalarope, Óðinshani Phalaropus lobatus
- Red phalarope, Þórshani Phalaropus fulicarius

== Skuas and jaegers ==
Order: Charadriiformes Family: Stercorariidae

The family Stercorariidae are, in general, medium to large sea birds, typically with grey or brown plumage, often with white markings on the wings. They nest on the ground in temperate and arctic regions and are long-distance migrants.

- Pomarine skua, Ískjói Stercorarius pomarinus (A)
- Arctic skua, Kjói Stercorarius parasiticus
- Long-tailed skua, Fjallkjói Stercorarius longicaudus (A)
- Great skua, Skúmur Stercorarius skua

== Gulls, terns, and skimmers ==
Order: Charadriiformes Family: Laridae

Laridae is a family of medium to large seabirds and includes gulls, terns, and skimmers. Gulls are typically grey or white, often with black markings on the head or wings. They have stout, longish, bills and webbed feet. Terns are a group of generally medium to large seabirds typically with grey or white plumage, often with black markings on the head. Most terns hunt fish by diving but some pick insects off the surface of fresh water. Gulls and terns are generally long-lived birds, with several species known to live in excess of 30 years.

- Laughing gull, Hláturmáfur Leucophaeus atricilla (A)
- Franklin's gull, Sléttumáfur Leucophaeus pipixcan (A)
- Bonaparte's gull, Trjámáfur Chroicocephalus philadelphia (A)
- Black-headed gull, Hettumáfur Chroicocephalus ridibundus
- Ring-billed gull, Hringmáfur Larus delawarensis (A)
- Common gull, Stormmáfur Larus canus
- Lesser black-backed gull, Sílamáfur Larus fuscus
- European herring gull, Silfurmáfur Larus argentatus
- Yellow-legged gull, Klapparmáfur Larus michahellis (A)
- American Herring Gull, Strandmáfur Larus smithsonianus (A)
- Iceland gull, Bjartmáfur Larus glaucoides
- Glaucous gull, Hvítmáfur Larus hyperboreus
- Great black-backed gull, Svartbakur Larus marinus
- Ross's gull, Rósamáfur Rhodostethia rosea (A)
- Black-legged kittiwake, Rita Rissa tridactyla
- Ivory gull, Ísmáfur Pagophila eburnea (A)
- Sabine's gull, Þernumáfur Xema sabini (A)
- Little gull, Dvergmáfur Hydrocoloeus minutus (A)
- Gull-billed tern, Sandþerna Gelochelidon nilotica (A)
- Sandwich tern, Þaraþerna Thalasseus sandvicensis (A)
- Common tern, Sílaþerna Sterna hirundo (A)
- Arctic tern, Kría Sterna paradisaea
- Forster's tern, Tálþerna Sterna forsteri (A)
- Sooty tern, Möttulþerna Onychoprion fuscatus (A)
- Little tern, Dvergþerna Sternula albifrons (A)
- Whiskered tern, Skeggþerna Chlidonias hybrida (A)
- Black tern, Kolþerna Chlidonias niger (A)
- White-winged tern, Tígulþerna Chlidonias leucopterus (A)

== Auks, guillemots, and puffins ==
Order: Charadriiformes Family: Alcidae

Alcidae are a family of seabirds which are superficially similar to penguins with their pied plumage, their upright posture, and some of their habits, but which are able to fly.

- Common guillemot, Langvía Uria aalge
- Brünnich's guillemot, Stuttnefja Uria lomvia
- Razorbill, Álka Alca torda
- Great auk, Geirfugl Pinguinus impennis (extinct)
- Black guillemot, Teista Cepphus grylle
- Little auk, Haftyrðill Alle alle
- Crested auklet, Toppklumba Aethia cristatella (A)
- Atlantic puffin, Lundi Fratercula arctica

== Pigeons and doves ==
Order: Columbiformes Family: Columbidae

Pigeons and doves are stout-bodied birds with short necks and short slender bills with a fleshy cere.

- Rock dove, Bjargdúfa/Húsdúfa Columba livia (C)
- Stock dove, Holudúfa Columba oenas (A)
- Common wood pigeon, Hringdúfa Columba palumbus (A)
- Eurasian collared dove, Tyrkjadúfa Streptopelia decaocto (A)
- European turtle dove, Turtildúfa Streptopelia turtur (A)
- Mourning dove, Tregadúfa Zenaida macroura (A)

== Cuckoos ==
Order: Cuculiformes Family: Cuculidae

The family Cuculidae includes cuckoos, roadrunners, and anis. These birds are of variable size with slender bodies, long tails, and strong legs. The Old World cuckoos are brood parasites.

- Common cuckoo, Gaukur Cuculus canorus (A)
- Black-billed cuckoo, Regngaukur Coccyzus erythropthalmus (A)
- Yellow-billed cuckoo, Spágaukur Coccyzus americanus (A)

== Owls ==
Order: Strigiformes Family: Strigidae

Typical owls are small to large solitary nocturnal birds of prey. They have large forward-facing eyes and ears, a hawk-like beak, and a conspicuous circle of feathers around each eye called a facial disk.

- Eurasian scops owl, Skopugla Otus scops (A)
- Snowy owl, Snæugla Bubo scandiacus (A)
- Long-eared owl, Eyrugla Asio otus (A)
- Short-eared owl, Brandugla Asio flammeus

== Nightjars and allies ==
Order: Caprimulgiformes Family: Caprimulgidae

Nightjars are medium-sized nocturnal birds that usually nest on the ground. They have long wings, short legs, and very short bills. Most have small feet, of little use for walking, and long pointed wings. Their soft plumage is camouflaged to resemble bark or leaves.

- Eurasian nightjar, Náttfari Caprimulgus europaeus (A)
- Common nighthawk, Húmfari Chordeiles minor (A)

== Swifts ==
Order: Caprimulgiformes Family: Apodidae

Swifts are small birds which spend the majority of their lives flying. These birds have very short legs and never settle voluntarily on the ground, perching instead only on vertical surfaces. Many swifts have long swept-back wings which resemble a crescent or boomerang.

- Common swift, Múrsvölungur Apus apus (A)
- Alpine swift, Alpasvölungur Apus melba (A)

== Kingfishers ==
Order: Coraciiformes Family: Alcedinidae

Kingfishers are medium-sized birds with large heads, long, pointed bills, short legs and stubby tails.

- Belted kingfisher, Beltaþyrill Ceryle alcyon (A)

== Bee-eaters ==
Order: Coraciiformes Family: Meropidae

The bee-eaters are a group of coraciiform birds in the family Meropidae. Most species are found in Africa but others occur in southern Europe, Madagascar, Australia and New Guinea. They are characterised by richly coloured plumage, slender bodies and usually elongated central tail feathers. All are colourful and have long downturned bills and pointed wings, which give them a swallow-like appearance when seen from afar.

- European bee-eater, Býsvelgur Merops apiaster (A)

== Rollers ==
Order: Coraciiformes Family: Coraciidae

Rollers resemble crows in size and build, but are more closely related to the kingfishers and bee-eaters. They share the colourful appearance of those groups with blues and browns predominating. The two inner front toes are connected, but the outer toe is not.

- European roller, Bláhrani Coracias garrulus (A)

== Hoopoes ==
Order: Bucerotiformes Family: Upupidae

Hoopoes have black, white and orangey-pink colouring with a large erectile crest on their head.

- Eurasian hoopoe, Herfugl Upupa epops (A)

== Woodpeckers ==
Order: Piciformes Family: Picidae

Woodpeckers are small to medium-sized birds with chisel-like beaks, short legs, stiff tails and long tongues used for capturing insects. Some species have feet with two toes pointing forward and two backward, while several species have only three toes. Many woodpeckers have the habit of tapping noisily on tree trunks with their beaks.

- Eurasian wryneck, Gauktíta Jynx torquilla (A)
- Yellow-bellied sapsucker, Safaspæta Sphyrapicus varius (A)
- Great spotted woodpecker, Barrspæta Dendrocopos major (A)

== Tyrant flycatchers ==
Order: Passeriformes Family: Tyrannidae

Tyrant flycatchers are Passerine birds which occur throughout North and South America. They superficially resemble the Old World flycatchers, but are more robust and have stronger bills. They do not have the sophisticated vocal capabilities of the songbirds. Most, but not all, are rather plain. As the name implies, most are insectivorous.

- Acadian flycatcher, Mýgreipur Empidonax virescens (A)
- Least flycatcher, Stúfgreipur Empidonax minimus (A)
- Alder flycatcher, Elrigreipur Empidonax alnorum (A)

== Larks ==
Order: Passeriformes Family: Alaudidae

Larks are small terrestrial birds with often extravagant songs and display flights. Most larks are fairly dull in appearance. Their food is insects and seeds.

- Greater short-toed lark, Sandlævirki Calandrella brachydactyla (A)
- Eurasian skylark, Sönglævirki Alauda arvensis (A)
- Horned lark, Fjallalævirki Eremophila alpestris (A)

== Swallows ==
Order: Passeriformes Family: Hirundinidae

The family Hirundinidae is adapted to aerial feeding. They have a slender streamlined body, long pointed wings, and a short bill with a wide gape. The feet are adapted to perching rather than walking, and the front toes are partially joined at the base.

- Sand martin, Bakkasvala Riparia riparia (A)
- Barn swallow, Landsvala Hirundo rustica (A)
- Western house martin, Bæjasvala Delichon urbicum (A)
- European red-rumped swallow, Cecropis rufula (A)
- Cliff swallow, Klettasvala Petrochelidon pyrrhonota (A)

== Wagtails and pipits ==
Order: Passeriformes Family: Motacillidae

Motacillidae is a family of small birds with medium to long tails which includes the wagtails, longclaws, and pipits. They are slender ground-feeding insectivores of open country.

- Tawny pipit, Sandtittlingur Anthus campestris (A)
- Olive-backed pipit, Skógtittlingur Anthus hodgsoni (A)
- Tree pipit, Trjátittlingur Anthus trivialis (A)
- Pechora pipit, Svarðtittlingur Anthus gustavi (A)
- Meadow pipit, Þúfutittlingur Anthus pratensis
- Buff-bellied pipit, Heiðatittlingur Anthus rubescens (A)
- Rock pipit, Strandtittlingur Anthus petrosus (A)
- Western yellow wagtail, Gulerla Motacilla flava (A)
- Citrine wagtail, Mýrerla Motacilla citreola (A)
- Grey wagtail, Straumerla Motacilla cinerea (A)
- White wagtail, Maríuerla Motacilla alba

== Waxwings ==
Order: Passeriformes Family: Bombycillidae

The waxwings are a group of birds with soft silky plumage and unique red tips to some of the wing feathers. In the Bohemian and cedar waxwings, these tips look like sealing wax and give the group its name. These are arboreal birds of northern forests. They live on insects in summer and berries in winter.

- Cedar waxwing, Sedrustoppa Bombycilla cedrorum (A)
- Bohemian waxwing, Silkitoppa Bombycilla garrulus (A)

== Wrens ==
Order: Passeriformes Family: Troglodytidae

The wrens are mainly small and inconspicuous except for their loud songs. These birds have short wings and thin down-turned bills. Several species often hold their tails upright. All are insectivorous.

- Eurasian wren, Músarrindill Troglodytes troglodytes

== Accentors ==
Order: Passeriformes Family: Prunellidae

The accentors are the only bird family which is endemic to the Palearctic. They are small, fairly drab species superficially similar to sparrows.

- Dunnock, Runntítla Prunella modularis (A)

== Old World flycatchers ==
Order: Passeriformes Family: Muscicapidae

Old World flycatchers are a large group of birds which are mainly small arboreal insectivores. The appearance of these birds is highly varied, but they mostly have weak songs and harsh calls.

- Dark-sided flycatcher, Muscicapa sibirica (A)
- Spotted flycatcher, Grágrípur Muscicapa striata (A)
- European robin, Glóbrystingur Erithacus rubecula (A)
- Thrush nightingale, Húmgali Luscinia luscinia (A)
- Common nightingale, Næturgali Luscinia megarhynchos (A)
- Bluethroat, Blábrystingur Luscinia svecica (A)
- Siberian rubythroat, Fagurgali Calliope calliope (A)
- Red-flanked bluetail, Tarsiger cyanurus (A)
- Red-breasted flycatcher, Peðgrípur Ficedula parva (A)
- European pied flycatcher, Flekkugrípur Ficedula hypoleuca (A)
- Black redstart, Húsaskotta Phoenicurus ochruros (A)
- Common redstart, Garðaskotta Phoenicurus phoenicurus (A)
- Whinchat, Vallskvetta Saxicola rubetra (A)
- European stonechat, Hagaskvetta Saxicola rubicola (A)
- Siberian stonechat, Saxicola maurus (A)
- Northern wheatear, Steindepill Oenanthe oenanthe
- Pied wheatear, Oenanthe pleschanka (A)

== Thrushes and allies ==
Order: Passeriformes Family: Turdidae

The thrushes are a family of birds that occur mainly in the Old World. They are plump, soft-plumaged, small-to-medium-sized insectivores or sometimes omnivores, often feeding on the ground. Many have attractive songs.

- White's thrush, Foldþröstur Zoothera aurea (A)
- Varied thrush, Barrþröstur Ixoreus naevius (A)
- Wood thrush, Trjáþröstur Hylocichla mustelina (A)
- Hermit thrush, Dulþröstur Catharus guttatus (A)
- Swainson's thrush, Moldþröstur Catharus ustulatus (A)
- Grey-cheeked thrush, Hlýraþröstur Catharus minimus (A)
- Ring ouzel, Mánaþröstur Turdus torquatus (A)
- Common blackbird, Svartþröstur Turdus merula
- Black-throated thrush, Þorraþröstur Turdus atrogularis (A)
- Fieldfare, Gráþröstur Turdus pilaris
- Song thrush, Söngþröstur Turdus philomelos (A)
- Redwing, Skógarþröstur Turdus iliacus
- Mistle thrush, Mistilþröstur Turdus viscivorus (A)
- American robin, Farþröstur Turdus migratorius (A)

== Grassbirds and allies ==
Order: Passeriformes Family: Locustellidae

Locustellidae are a family of small insectivorous songbirds found mainly in Eurasia, Africa, and the Australian region. They are smallish birds with tails that are usually long and pointed, and tend to be drab brownish or buffy all over.

- Lanceolated warbler, Lensusöngvari Locustella lanceolata (A)
- Grasshopper warbler, Engisöngvari Locustella naevia (A)
- River warbler, Straumsöngvari Locustella fluviatilis (A)

== Reed warblers and allies ==
Order: Passeriformes Family: Acrocephalidae

The members of this family are rather plain olivaceous brown above with much yellow to beige below. They are usually found in open woodland, reedbeds, or tall grass. The family occurs mostly in southern to western Eurasia and surroundings, but it also ranges far into the Pacific, with some species in Africa.

- Sykes's warbler, Trjásöngvari Iduna rama (A)
- Eastern olivaceous warbler, Fölsöngvari Iduna pallida (A)
- Icterine warbler, Spésöngvari Hippolais icterina (A)
- Melodious warbler, Skopsöngvari Hippolais polyglotta (A)
- Sedge warbler, Síkjasöngvari Acrocephalus schoenobaenus (A)
- Paddyfield warbler, Dvalsöngvari Acrocephalus agricola (A)
- Blyth's reed warbler, Elrisöngvari Acrocephalus dumetorum (A)
- Marsh warbler, Seljusöngvari Acrocephalus palustris (A)
- Eurasian reed warbler, Sefsöngvari Acrocephalus scirpaceus (A)

== Sylviid warblers and allies ==
Order: Passeriformes Family: Sylviidae

The family Sylviidae is a group of small insectivorous birds. They mainly occur as breeding species, as another common name (Old World warblers) implies, in Europe, Asia and, to a lesser extent, Africa. Most are of generally undistinguished appearance, but many have distinctive songs.

- Eastern subalpine warbler, Kampasöngvari Curruca cantillans (A)
- Barred warbler, Hauksöngvari Curruca nisoria (A)
- Lesser whitethroat, Netlusöngvari Curruca curruca (A)
- Common whitethroat, Þyrnisöngvari Curruca communis (A)
- Garden warbler, Garðsöngvari Sylvia borin (A)
- Eurasian blackcap, Hettusöngvari Sylvia atricapilla (A)

== Leaf warblers ==
Order: Passeriformes Family: Phylloscopidae

Leaf warblers are a family of small insectivorous birds found mostly in Eurasia and ranging into Wallacea and Africa. The species are of various sizes, often green-plumaged above and yellow below, or more subdued with greyish-green to greyish-brown colours.

- Arctic warbler, Norðsöngvari Phylloscopus borealis (A)
- Yellow-browed warbler, Hnoðrasöngvari Phylloscopus inornatus (A)
- Wood warbler, Grænsöngvari Phylloscopus sibilatrix (A)
- Common chiffchaff, Gransöngvari Phylloscopus collybita (A)
- Willow warbler, Laufsöngvari Phylloscopus trochilus (A)

== Crests and kinglets ==
Order: Passeriformes Family: Regulidae

The crests and kinglets are a small family of birds which resemble some warblers. They are very small insectivorous birds in the genera Regulus and Corthylio. The adults have coloured crowns, giving rise to their name.

- Ruby-crowned kinglet, Rauðkollur Corthylio calendula (A)
- Goldcrest, Glókollur Regulus regulus

== Tits, chickadees, and titmice ==
Order: Passeriformes Family: Paridae

The Paridae are mainly small stocky woodland species with short stout bills. Some have crests. They are adaptable birds, with a mixed diet including seeds and insects.

- Great tit, Flotmeisa Parus major (A)

== Nuthatches ==
Order: Passeriformes Family: Sittidae

Nuthatches are small woodland birds. They have the unusual ability to climb down trees head first, unlike other birds which can only go upwards. Nuthatches have big heads, short tails, and powerful bills and feet.

- Red-breasted nuthatch, Bandigða Sitta canadensis (A)

== Old World orioles ==
Order: Passeriformes Family: Oriolidae

The Old World orioles are colourful passerine birds. They are not related to the New World orioles.

- Eurasian golden oriole, Laufglói Oriolus oriolus (A)

== Shrikes ==
Order: Passeriformes Family: Laniidae

Shrikes are passerine birds known for their habit of catching other birds and small animals and impaling the uneaten portions of their bodies on thorns. A shrike's beak is hooked, like that of a typical bird of prey.

- Isabelline shrike, Bleiksvarri Lanius isabellinus (A)
- Red-backed shrike, Þyrnisvarri Lanius collurio (A)
- Great grey shrike, Grásvarri Lanius excubitor (A)
- Woodchat shrike, Trjásvarri Lanius senator (A)

== Crows, jays, and magpies ==
Order: Passeriformes Family: Corvidae

The family Corvidae includes crows, ravens, jays, choughs, magpies, treepies, nutcrackers, and ground jays. Corvids are above average in size among the Passeriformes, and some of the larger species show high levels of intelligence.

- Eurasian jackdaw, Dvergkráka Corvus monedula (A)
- Rook, Bláhrafn Corvus frugilegus (A)
- Hooded crow, Grákráka Corvus cornix (A)
- Common raven, Hrafn Corvus corax

== Starlings ==
Order: Passeriformes Family: Sturnidae

Starlings are small to medium-sized passerine birds. Their flight is strong and direct and they are very gregarious. Their preferred habitat is fairly open country. They eat insects and fruit. Their plumage is typically dark with a metallic sheen.

- Common starling, Stari Sturnus vulgaris
- Rosy starling, Rósastari Pastor roseus (A)

== Old World sparrows ==
Order: Passeriformes Family: Passeridae

In general, Old World sparrows tend to be small, plump, brown or grey birds with short tails and short powerful beaks. Sparrows are seed eaters, but they also consume small insects.

- House sparrow, Gráspör Passer domesticus (A)
- Eurasian tree sparrow, Trjáspör Passer montanus (A)

== Vireos and allies ==
Order: Passeriformes Family: Vireonidae

The vireos are a group of small to medium-sized passerine birds. They are typically greenish in colour and resemble New World warblers apart from their heavier bills.

- Red-eyed vireo, Græningi Vireo olivaceus (A)

== Finches and allies ==
Order: Passeriformes Family: Fringillidae

Finches are seed-eating birds that are small to moderately large and have a strong beak, usually conical and in some species very large. All have twelve tail feathers and nine primaries. These birds have a bouncing flight with alternating bouts of flapping and gliding on closed wings, and most sing well.

- Common chaffinch, Bókfinka Fringilla coelebs (A)
- Brambling, Fjallafinka Fringilla montifringilla (A)
- European greenfinch, Grænfinka Chloris chloris (A)
- European goldfinch, Þistilfinka Carduelis carduelis (A)
- Eurasian siskin, Barrfinka Spinus spinus (A)
- Eurasian linnet, Hörfinka Linaria cannabina (A)
- Common redpoll, Auðnutittlingur Acanthis flammea
- Arctic redpoll, Hrímtittlingur Acanthis hornemanni (A)
- Two-barred crossbill, Víxlnefur Loxia leucoptera (A)
- Common crossbill, Krossnefur Loxia curvirostra (A)
- Parrot crossbill, Pánefur Loxia pytyopsittacus (A)
- Common rosefinch, Rósafinka Carpodacus erythrinus (A)
- Eurasian bullfinch, Dómpápi Pyrrhula pyrrhula (A)
- Hawfinch, Kjarnbítur Coccothraustes coccothraustes (A)

== New World warblers ==
Order: Passeriformes Family: Parulidae

Parulidae are a group of small, often colourful birds restricted to the New World. Most are arboreal and insectivorous.

- Black-and-white warbler, Klifurskríkja Mniotilta varia (A)
- Tennessee warbler, Ormskríkja Oreothlypis peregrina (A)
- Northern parula, Fléttuskríkja Setophaga americana (A)
- Yellow warbler, Gulskríkja Setophaga aestiva (A)
- Cerulean warbler, Blámaskríkja Setophaga cerulea (A)
- Black-throated blue warbler, Bláskríkja Setophaga caerulescens (A)
- Black-throated green warbler, Grænskríkja Setophaga virens (A)
- Blackburnian warbler, Glóskríkja Setophaga fusca (A)
- Magnolia warbler, Daggarskríkja Setophaga magnolia (A)
- Yellow-rumped warbler, Krúnuskríkja Setophaga coronata (A)
- Palm warbler, Pálmaskríkja Setophaga palmarum (A)
- Blackpoll warbler, Rákaskríkja Setophaga striata (A)
- American redstart, Húmskríkja Setophaga ruticilla (A)
- Common yellowthroat, Grímuskríkja Geothlypis trichas (A)
- Canada warbler, Haustskríkja Cardellina canadensis (A)

== Cardinals and allies ==
Order: Passeriformes Family: Cardinalidae

The cardinals are a family of robust seed-eating birds with strong bills. They are typically associated with open woodland. The sexes usually have distinct plumage.

- Scarlet tanager, Skarlatstáni Piranga olivacea (A)
- Rose-breasted grosbeak, Tígultáti Pheucticus ludovicianus (A)
- Indigo bunting, Blátittlingur Passerina cyanea (A)

== New World sparrows ==
Order: Passeriformes Family: Passerellidae

Until 2017, these species were considered part of the family Emberizidae. Most of the species are known as sparrows, but these birds are not closely related to the Old World sparrows which are in the family Passeridae. Many have distinctive head patterns.

- Fox sparrow, Tófutittlingur Passerella iliaca (A)
- White-crowned sparrow, Kúftittlingur Zonotrichia leucophrys (A)
- White-throated sparrow, Hörputittlingur Zonotrichia albicollis (A)
- Dark-eyed junco, Vetrartittlingur Junco hyemalis (A)

== Longspurs and snow buntings ==
Order: Passeriformes Family: Calcariidae

The Calcariidae are a family of birds that had been traditionally grouped with the buntings, but differ in a number of respects and are usually found in open grassy areas.

- Lapland longspur, Sportittlingur Calcarius lapponicus (A)
- Snow bunting, Snjótittlingur Plectrophenax nivalis

== Old World buntings ==
Order: Passeriformes Family: Emberizidae

Emberizidae is a family of passerine birds containing a single genus. Until 2017, the New World sparrows (Passerellidae) were also considered part of this family.

- Pine bunting, Lerkitittlingur Emberiza leucocephalos (A)
- Yellowhammer, Gultittlingur Emberiza citrinella (A)
- Ortolan bunting, Dultittlingur Emberiza hortulana (A)
- Rustic bunting, Hrístittlingur Emberiza rustica (A)
- Little bunting, Dvergtittlingur Emberiza pusilla (A)
- Yellow-breasted bunting, Víðitittlingur Emberiza aureola (A)
- Reed bunting, Seftittlingur Emberiza schoeniclus (A)
- Black-headed bunting, Hettutittlingur Emberiza melanocephala (A)

== Troupials and allies ==
Order: Passeriformes Family: Icteridae

The icterids are a group of small to medium-sized, often colourful passerine birds restricted to the New World and include the grackles, New World blackbirds, and New World orioles. Most species have black as a predominant plumage colour, often enlivened by yellow, orange, or red.

- Yellow-headed blackbird, Gullsóti Xanthocephalus xanthocephalus (A)

== See also ==
- List of birds
- Lists of birds by region
