= Annenkov Island =

Island off South Georgia

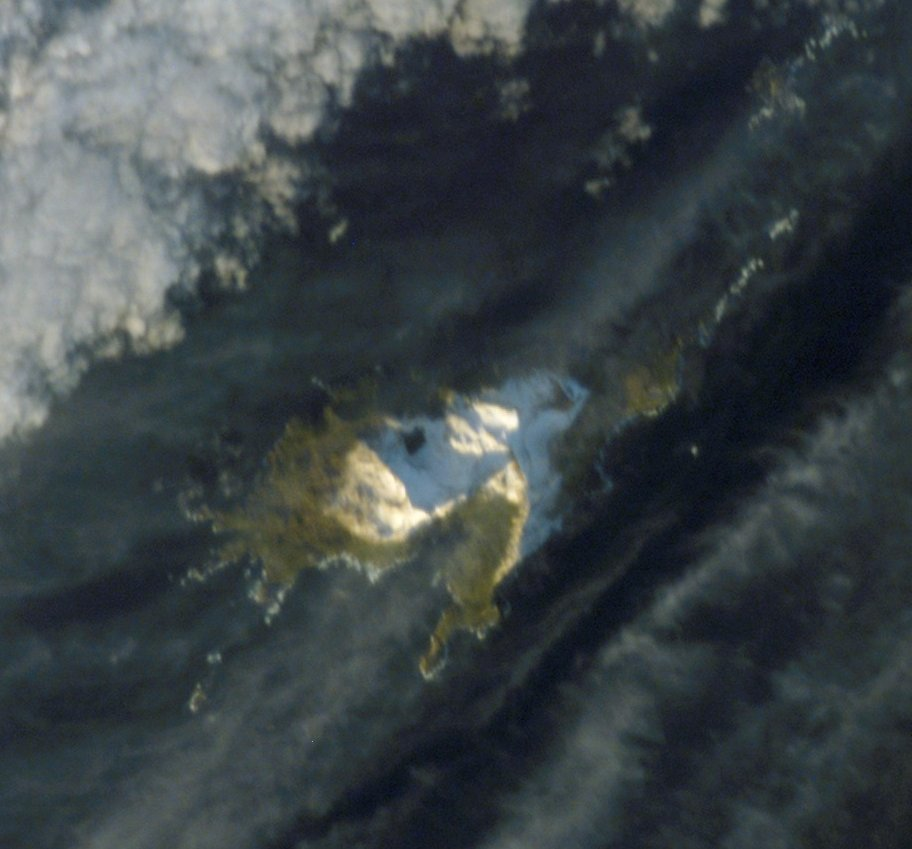
- Satellite image of the island

- Map showing Annenkov Island to the west of South Georgia Island

Geography
- Coordinates: 54°29′S 37°5′W
- Archipelago: South Georgia Islands
- Length: 4 mi (6 km)
- Highest elevation: 650 m (2130 ft)

Administration
- United Kingdom
- Overseas Territory: South Georgia and the South Sandwich Islands

Demographics
- Population: Uninhabited

Annenkov Island is an island in South Georgia and the South Sandwich Islands, to the west of the main island of South Georgia. The Pickersgill Islands are to its southeast. It is irregularly shaped and 4 miles (6.4 km) long and 650 m (2,130 ft) high, lying 8 miles (13 km) off the south-central coast of South Georgia.

== History ==
The island was discovered in January 1775 by a British expedition under James Cook, who named it Pickersgills Island for Lieutenant Richard Pickersgill of the expedition ship HMS Resolution. It was rediscovered in 1819 by a Russian expedition under Fabian Gottlieb von Bellingshausen on the Vostok, who, thinking he was the discoverer of the island, named it Annenkov Island, in honour of Lt. Mikhail D. Annenkov (1794 – 1839), officer on the expedition ship. The name Pickersgill has become established for a group of islands 15 miles (24 km) to the southeast—see Pickersgill Islands.

Discovery Investigations (DI) surveyed the area in the period 1926–30. The Norvegia expedition under Harald Horntvedt visited the area between 1927 and 1928. The island was surveyed by the South Georgia Survey between 1951–1957. Many of its features were named by the United Kingdom Antarctic Place-Names Committee (UK-APC) following these surveys. Others were named following a geological survey by the British Antarctic Survey (BAS), 1972–73.

== Geography ==
Except where noted, the following features were named by UK-APC.

Annenkov island is a rocky island with a number of ridges and hills, particularly toward the centre. The highest point is Olstad Peak, which rises to 650 m (2,130 ft). Olstad Peak was named for Norwegian zoologist and expedition member Ola Olstad. An irregular ridge called Bareback Ridge extends north from Olstad Peak. The name stems from the absence of surficial material and vegetation from its top and sides. Towards the centre of the island, the McPherson Crags rise to 460 m (1,510 ft). They were named for Ray McPherson, a British Antarctic Survey (BAS) officer. To the east, Lawther Knoll is a rounded, scree-covered hill rising to 315 metres (1,030 ft). It was named for BAS geologist Eric Lawther.

First Point, charted and named by DI, is the northwest point of Annenkov Island. Mislaid Rock, first named on a 1931 British Admiralty chart, lies offshore to the southwest. The name appears to be first used on a 1931 British Admiralty chart.

On the eastern arm of the island is a tussock-covered ridge called Albatross Crest, named for the wandering albatross (Diomedea exulans) which nests here. On the north coast of the eastern tip of the island, Spilite Arch is a sea-worn arch formed by a pillar of rock 30 m (98 ft) high joined to the coastal cliffs by a spilite sill.

Towards the south end of the island, Pettigrew Scarp is an escarpment nearly 0.5 nmi (0.93 km) long, which terminates to the southwest in a ridge, and in the northeast by three rock pinnacles. It was named for BAS geologist Timothy Pettigrew.

South West Point marks the southwest point of Annenkov Island, and appears to have been first named on a chart based upon DI surveys undertaken in the period 1926–30. East of this point, Rustad Bay indents the island's southwest coast. It was named for Norwegian biologist Ditlef Rustad. West of the point, Horror Rock lies 3.5 nautical miles (6 km) offshore. It was named from the circumstances of the rock's discovery by HMS Owen (K640) on 21 February 1961. The ship avoided striking the rock in rough weather and low visibility, passing within 1 nautical mile (2 km) of heavy breakers.

The island also contains some named freshwater lakes mapped and named by the British Antarctic Survey in 1972–73. Intrusion Lake, a 0.2 miles (0.32 km) long lake, is located north-northeast of Olstad Peak in the center of the island; it was named because its irregular shape is controlled by several intrusions of andesite along its north shore. Fan Lake is a small lake located in the southeast of the island. The lake is fed by meltwater and is bounded to the west by an alluvial fan, from which the name is derived.

The island is surrounded by reefs, including Hauge Reef and Low Reef to the east.

== Wildlife ==
A site of special scientific interest, Annenkov always was and remains one of the few rat-free islands of the South Georgia archipelago. Approximately half of the island is covered with tussock grass.

500 wandering albatross pairs breed here.

== See also ==
- Composite Antarctic Gazetteer
- History of South Georgia and the South Sandwich Islands
- List of Antarctic islands north of 60° S
- Scientific Committee on Antarctic Research
