= Somerville Island =

Island in Wilhelm Archipelago, Antarctica

- Location within Antarctica

Geography
- Location: Antarctica
- Coordinates: 65°22′S 64°19′W
- Archipelago: Wilhelm Archipelago

Administration
- Administered under the Antarctic Treaty System

Demographics
- Population: Uninhabited

Somerville Island is a small island 7.4 kilometres (4 nmi) southwest of Berthelot Islands and 4.6 kilometres (2.5 nmi) northwest of Darboux Island, in the Wilhelm Archipelago, off the west coast of the Antarctic Peninsula in Antarctica. Discovered by the French Antarctic Expedition, 1908–1910, under Charcot, and named by him for Crichton Somerville, a resident of Oslo, Norway, who selected and supervised the making of much of the polar clothing and equipment used by the expedition.

== See also ==
- List of Antarctic and sub-Antarctic islands
