= Richard Pickersgill =

English Royal Navy officer (1749–1779)

- Born: 18 April 1749; West Tanfield, Yorkshire
- Died: July 1779 (aged 30) River Thames, London
- Allegiance: Great Britain
- Branch: Royal Navy
- Service years: 1764–1777
- Rank: Lieutenant
- Conflicts: Seven Years' War; American Revolutionary War

Lieutenant Richard Pickersgill (18 April 1749 – July 1779) was an English Royal Navy officer who accompanied the sailor and explorer James Cook on two of his Pacific voyages.

Richard Pickersgill was born in 1749 in West Tanfield, near Ripon, to Richard and Ann Pickersgill (née Lee). Pickersgill was the nephew of John Lee, the servant of George Jackson, a senior officer in the Admiralty. It is believed that his uncle managed to position him through his relationships on his first ships.

In 1766, at the age of 17, he participated in the circumnavigation of the world under Captain Samuel Wallis on HMS Dolphin. Two years later, on 26 August 1768, Pickersgill belonged as a Master's mate on HMS Endeavour, which set off with James Cook to its first South Sea voyage. On this trip he also impressed Cook, who had a high opinion of his skills as a surveyor, his dealings with the indigenous peoples they encountered, and his judgment. When Robert Molineux, the Master of the Endeavour, died on the return journey to England, Pickersgill was promoted to Master on 16 April 1771. After his return to London, Pickersgill was promoted on Cook's recommendation to Lieutenant. On 13 July 1772, Cook began his second expedition with HMS Resolution, and Richard Pickersgill joined as the Third Lieutenant.

He did not accompany Cook on his third voyage, but in April 1776 took command of the ship Lyon and was sent to Baffin Bay on the east coast of Canada.

Richard Pickersgill died in 1779 at the age of 30, when he accidentally fell into the Thames River when boarding a ship and drowned.

According to Richard Pickersgill, the Pickersgill Islands off South Georgia in the South Atlantic and Pickersgill Harbour, a natural harbour in New Zealand, were named after him.
