= Larvik Cone =

Larvik Cone (54°22′S 36°52′W) is a low but prominent scree cone, 425 metres (1,400 ft) high, on the promontory between Newark Bay and Jacobsen Bight, on the southern coast of South Georgia. It was roughly sketched by the British South Georgia Expedition, 1954–55, and named "Larvik Peak" from association with nearby Larvik. The South Georgia Survey, 1956–57, reported that cone is a more suitable descriptive term.
