= Shaw Islands =

Island group in Enderby Land, Antarctica

Shaw Islands (67°33′S 47°44′E) is a group of four islands lying 3.2 km (2 mi) north of the central part of McKinnon Island, off the coast of Enderby Land. Plotted from ANARE (Australian National Antarctic Research Expeditions) air photos taken in 1956. Named by Antarctic Names Committee of Australia (ANCA) for John E. Shaw (1929-2017), an Australian physicist at Mawson Station in 1957.

== See also ==
- List of Antarctic and sub-Antarctic islands
