= Dysentery bush =

Dysentery bush is a common name for several Australian plants and may refer to:

- Alyxia buxifolia
- Grewia latifolia, endemic to Northern and Eastern Australia
- Grewia retusifolia
