= Clapperton Island =

Island in the Northwest Territories, Canada

Coordinates: 69°42′01″N 123°57′09″W

Clapperton Island is located in the Northwest Territories, Canada, within Franklin Bay. It is 23 km (14 mi) from Cape Lyon. The island was named by John Franklin in honour of the explorer Hugh Clapperton. It is composed of limestone and is skirted by detached rocks.
