= Bernhard Hantzsch =

German ornithologist and Arctic researcher (1875–1911)

Bernhard Adolph Hantzsch
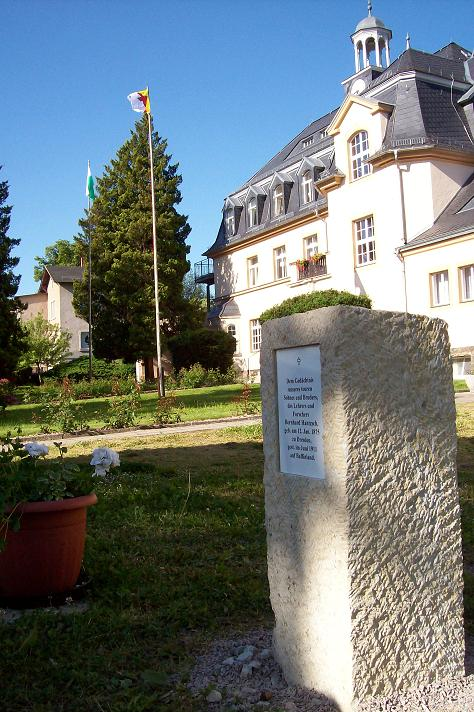
- Born: 12 January 1875; Dresden, Germany
- Died: June 1911 (aged 36); Baffin Island, Canada
- Known for: Discovered two new Icelandic bird subspecies
- Scientific career
- Fields: Ornithologist

Bernhard Adolph Hantzsch (12 January 1875 – June 1911) was a German ornithologist, Arctic researcher, and writer, notable for his discovery of two Icelandic bird subspecies. Hantzsch was the first white man to cross Baffin Island.

== Early life ==
Hantzsch was born in Dresden, Germany the youngest son of the school master and researcher Adolf Hantzsch (1841–1920) and his wife Emma Jencke (1842–1889), niece of Johann Friedrich Jencke (1812–1893), the founder of the Dresden Institute, the first deaf institution. Hantzsch's siblings include the geographer and historian Viktor Hantzsch (1868–1910), the builder Hermann Hantzsch (1870–1945), and the clergyman Paul Kleinert's wife, Bertha Kleinert (1873–1924).

He was baptised on 8 February 1875 by the deacon, Dr. Frommhold from Dresden's Anne Church (Annenkirche). During the period of 1881 to 1889, he attended the second public school in Dresden.

At an early age, Hantzsch spent time in Tharandt Forest for health reasons. He later became an assistant teacher in Grillenburg, a village within the forest, giving him the opportunity to study bird life and developing an ornithological career.

While having little inclination to foreign languages in his early years, he later became fluent in Croatian, English, Danish, and Inuktitut.

== Career ==
After receiving a position in 1897 at a public school in Dresden, he was able to continue his bird studies but in more varied terrain. In 1897, Hantzsch published his first scientific paper. Like all his future contributions, it was written in German language, and thus unavailable or overlooked by many ornithologists until recent years.

Beginning in 1898, he made trips to Slavonia to study waders and waterfowl, and to Bulgaria in 1901. With the connections he received there, Hantzsch was able to study birds of prey in the Rhodope Mountains and the Balkans.

After developing a "Check-List of the Birds of the Kingdom of Saxony, Hantzsch explored Iceland, he left for Iceland to study its birds during the period of 21 April-8 September 1903. There, he developed a scientific systematization of Icelandic birds. He is credited for the discovery of the subspecies Acanthis Linaria islandica in 1904, and Corvus corax islandicus in 1906. He developed two avifaunal lists of important regions in Europe, such as his 1905 Contribution to Knowledge of the Avifauna of Iceland.

In 1906, Hantzsch conducted research in Canada on the avifauna of the northeastern Labrador Peninsula, working in Killinek (Port Burwell) for several months, and then proceeding southward. He published Contribution to Knowledge of the Avifauna of Labrador in 1908. He also did research on egg shells. Hantzsch's research was not restricted to ornithology, and he published Contribution to Knowledge of Northeastern Labrador in 1909.

Having secured almost 15,000 marks from the Society of Friends of Nature Institution of Berlin, the Rudolf Virchow Foundation of Berlin, and King Frederick Augustus III of Saxony, Hantzsch was prepared to spend three years on Baffin Island. According to The New York Times, this trip aroused keen interest in the scientific community. He set off in 1909, and encountered disaster when his ship, the Janthina Agatha, hit ice in Cumberland Sound and sank, losing most of its cargo. Hantzsch and the entire crew found refuge on Blacklead Island. With the assistance of some Inuit, he hauled a boat to Nettilling Lake, reaching it June of the following year. They reached Kokdjuak River at the end of August, and Foxe Channel at the end of September, becoming the first European to cross Baffin Island.

== Death and legacy ==
Suffering from the hardship of his travels, and having eaten polar bear, Hantzsch died of trichinosis on Baffin Island in 1911. His Inuit companions buried him on the shores of Foxe Basin.

In 1913, his family established the Bernhard Hantzsch Foundation to assist North Polar region exploration.

Hantzsch's Baffin Island zoological collections are located at the Royal Zoological Museum of Berlin. His Saxon ornithology collection and Labrador zoological-anthropological collections are located at the Zoological Anthropological Museum of Dresden. The Slavonian egg collection is located at the Dresden Heimatkundliche Schulmuseum.

Hantzsch Island, on the southern tip of Baffin Island, and Hantzsch River on Baffin Island are named in his honor.

Dresden's Hantzschstraße is named after Hantzsch and his brother Viktor.

Hantzsch was an influence on the British Arctic explorer Pen Hadow, who, after finding and reading a copy of Hantzsch's translated diaries in the Royal Geographical Society library, decided to complete Hantzsch's trip.

In 2005, on behalf of the Alouette publishing house in Oststeinbek, a research trip for a film project, including to descendants of the Inuit with whom Hantzsch travelled until his death, took place to Baffin Island, some of the travel being via the icebreaker CCGS Henry Larsen.

== Selected works ==
- (1913). Observations on the mammals of Baffin's Land. OCLC 70485001
- (1929). Contribution to the knowledge of the avifauna of North-Eastern Labrador. OCLC 31841174
- (1930). Southern Baffin Island: an account of exploration, investigation and settlement during the past fifty years. OCLC 3473816

== Bibliography ==
- Anderson, Rudolph Martin (October 1928). "The work of Bernhard Hantzsch in Arctic ornithology". Auk. 45 (4): 450–466. doi:10.2307/4075632. JSTOR 4075632.
- Hantzsch, B., & Neatby, L. H. (1977). My life among the Eskimos: Baffinland journeys in the years 1909 to 1911. Saskatoon, [Sask.]: University of Saskatchewan. OCLC 4497965
