= Johnson Point (South Georgia) =

Coordinates: 54°24′S 36°50′W

Johnson Point is a point jutting into Jacobsen Bight dividing it into two bays, on the south coast of South Georgia. The point marks the southern end of one of the best sedimentary successions on the island. It was named by the UK Antarctic Place-Names Committee in 1982 after Clive E. Johnson, a British Antarctic Survey field assistant in the area in 1975–76, and at Rothera Station, 1977–79. Clive Johnson is now one of the most experienced polar explorers in the UK today; in 2001, he was awarded the 'Polar Medal' by Her Majesty Queen Elizabeth II for his 'Outstanding contribution to and as a member of British polar expeditions.'
