= Point Parker =

Coordinates: 17°02′S 139°09′E

Point Parker is an isolated place in Queensland on the shores of the Gulf of Carpentaria opposite Allen Island and south of Mornington Island. The point is distinctive as the coast turns at roughly a right angle at this location.

== Transcontinental railway ==
Its main claim to fame was in the 1880s as the northern end of a Transcontinental railway from Charleville, to be built by the system of landgrants. The line would have been about 1070 miles long, while remaining with the borders of the state of Queensland.

This railway never got off the ground.

== Port ==
Point Parker was considered to be a good anchorage as islands immediately opposite, namely Mornington Island, Allen Island and others provided shelter.

The area contains wetlands with mangroves and tidal flats.
