= Jacobsen Bight =

Coordinates: 54°25′S 36°50′W

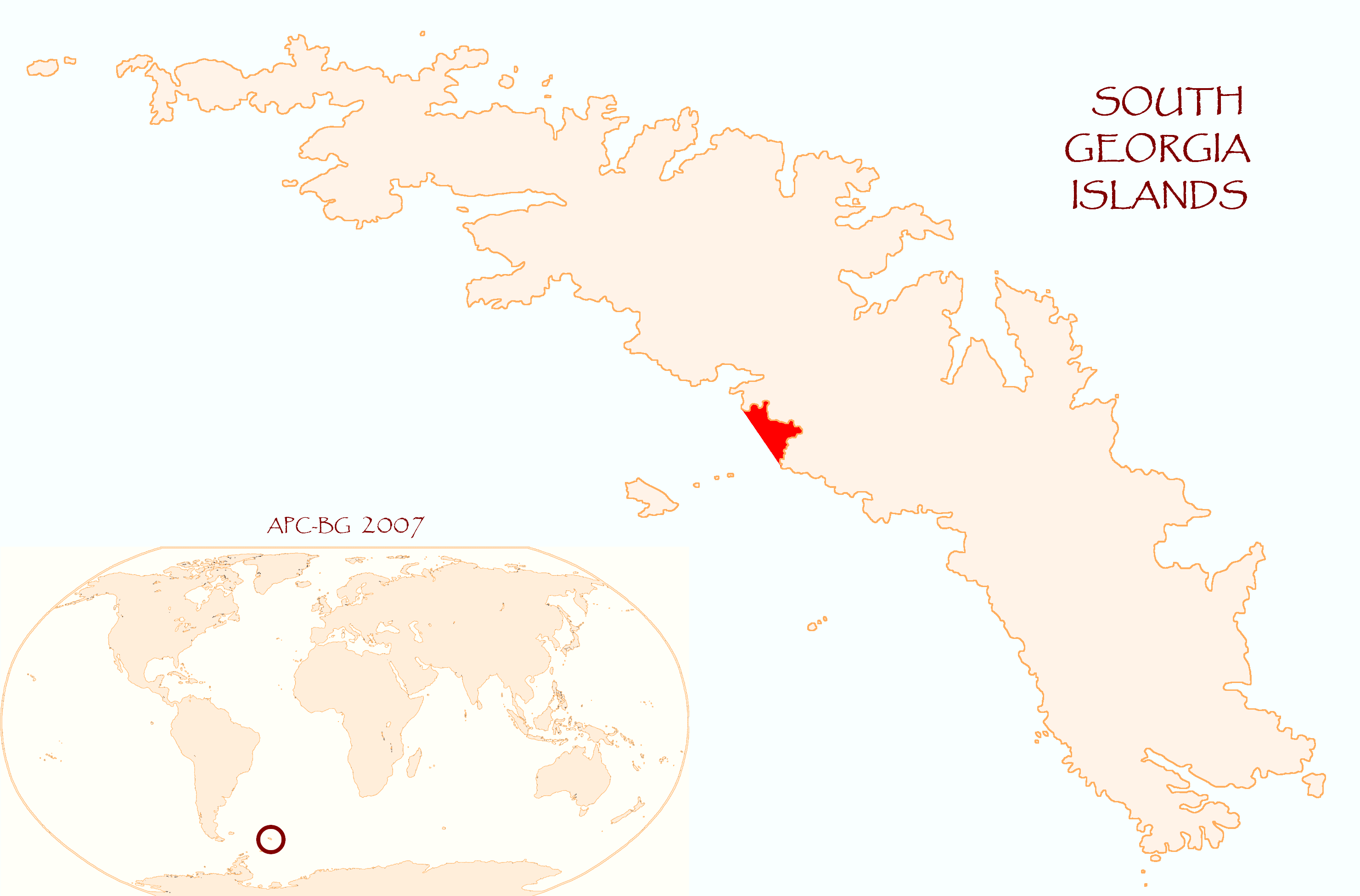

Jacobsen Bight is a bight 4 miles (6.4 km) wide, indenting the south coast of South Georgia between Larvik Cone and Cape Darnley. The name "Sukkertopp bukta" (Sugarloaf Bay) was used by Olaf Holtedahl in 1929 for the whole of the coast between Cape Darnley and Sandefjord, which was shown on his map as one bay. The name "Zuckerspitzenbucht" was used for the northwestern of two bays shown on this same stretch of coast by Ludwig Kohl-Larsen in 1930. The South Georgia Survey, 1951–52, surveyed this coast in detail and confirmed the existence of two bays. As the names derived from Mount Sugartop are misleading (the mountain does not dominate the bay) and as none of the existing names for the feature are used locally, the UK Antarctic Place-Names Committee in 1957 proposed a new name. Jacobsen Bight is for Fridthjof Jacobsen (1874–1933), who worked at the Compañía Argentina de Pesca station at Grytviken, 1904–21, and later became vice president of the company.

The bight is divided into two bays by Johnson Point.
