= Thistle Island =

Island in South Australia

Coordinates: 34°59′56″S 136°08′30″E

Thistle Island / Noondala
Native name: Nundala (Nauo)
- Location within South Australia

Geography
- Location: Spencer Gulf

Administration
- Australia

Thistle Island / Noondala (Nauo: Nundala) is in the Spencer Gulf, South Australia, some 200 kilometres (120 mi) west of Adelaide, and northwest of the Gambier Islands. The city of Port Lincoln lies to the northwest of the island. Between them, the Gambier Islands and Thistle form a chain across the mouth of the gulf between the southern tips of the Yorke and Eyre Peninsulas, sometimes referred to as the Taylor Islands group.

The island is approximately 17 kilometres (10.5 mi) long and varies in width from 1 kilometre wide (0.6 mi) at its narrowest central part to 4 kilometres (2.5 mi) wide in the south-east part. Whaler's Bay is a wide bay on the east coast of the island, and Albatross Island is a tiny island to the south.

As of 2014 the Royal Australian Navy operated an acoustic range, the South Australian Acoustic Range (SAAR), to help develop sonar techniques for submarines in the waters west of Thistle Island, with a small control facility being located on the island itself.

== History ==
The original Barngarla name for Thistle Island is Noondala.

Thistle island was named by British explorer Matthew Flinders in 1802, after a terrible accident in which a cutter that was mastered by John Thistle and carrying 7 other men, overturned in choppy seas while returning from the mainland to the ship. Despite frantic searching by the ships crew, the bodies of the men were never found. Flinders also named several smaller islands in the area after the lost crew.

Evidence of a failed settlement was noted by early whalers. It was speculated that the remains, which "the ruins of some cottages with signs of regular order in their arrangement and a cleared promenade between them, all the loose limestone for a distance of a bout 100 yards having been thrown on each side of a broad path." It was speculated that the ruins may have been built by survivors of the La Perouse expedition of 1788.

A small community of sealers, their Aboriginal "wives" and children were living on the island by 1832. They are thought to have had their camp on the shore of Waterhouse Bay.

The South Australian Company established a shore-based bay whaling station at Whalers Bay in 1838, during the period of British colonisation of South Australia. A team of experienced whalers were brought from Tasmania with H.B.T. McFarlane in charge as headsman. The operation had limited success during the 1838 season and none at all in the 1839 season. It was concluded the location was too far from the migration route of the southern right whale and the site was abandoned.

The historic Whalers Bay Whaling Site and Thistle Island Sealing Site are both listed on the South Australian Heritage Register.

== Geology ==
Thistle Island has a crystalline basement overlain by calcareous aeolianite. There are steep cliffs of calcareous aeolianite on the shore. There are recent beach sands on the eastern side, and several small lakes exist on the other side of a strip of coastal dunes.

Albatross Island is a tiny island that has a predominantly crystalline basement with a thin layer of calcareous aeolianite.

== Flora and fauna ==
Visitors to Thistle Island in 1877 found neither little penguins nor Australian sea lions, but did find numbers of paper nautilus shells on the island's inner beach. Visitors to Whaler's Bay heard the calls of "hundreds" of little penguins from their anchorage there in 1904. In 1932, J. T. Mortlock gave an account from Whaler's Bay of the "mournful symphony of the curlews and penguins in the nearby cliffs".

An account of a visit in 1928 wrote: "On Black Rock, at the north end of Thistle Island, we disturbed a large colony of seals, which rapidly scrambled into the water as the yacht passed by. Shags were plentiful. Many types of sea fowl were observed, including gannet, arctic skua, mollyhawk and stormy petrel."

Former Lord Mayor of Adelaide A. S. Hawker held a fishing record for a 47-pound (21 kg) tuna that he caught off Thistle Island in the late 1930s.

Little penguin breeding sites were noted in a 1996 survey of South Australia's offshore islands, though the colony may have been recorded on Albatross Island, off the island's southern tip.

The island is the home to an introduced population of the greater bilby, originally bred at Monarto Zoo. By October 2020, the population was thriving so well on Thistle Island that it was possible to trap nine bilbies for relocation to the Arid Recovery Reserve near Roxby Downs, to help boost the gene pool there.
