= Pickersgill Islands =

Island group in South Georgia and the South Sandwich Islands

- The Pickersgill Islands shown in relation to South Georgia (north at top)

Geography
- Coordinates: 54°37′S 36°45′W
- Archipelago: South Georgia

Administration
- United Kingdom

The Pickersgill Islands are a small archipelago to the west of the main island of South Georgia. They are 15 miles (24 km) southeast of Annenkov Island and 9 miles (14 km) west-southwest of Leon Head, South Georgia.

== History ==
Annenkov Island was discovered in January 1775 by a British expedition under James Cook, who named it "Pickersgill's Island" after Lieutenant Richard Pickersgill of the expedition ship HMS Resolution. It was re-discovered in 1819 by a Russian expedition under Fabian Gottlieb von Bellingshausen, who, thinking he had discovered the island, named it Annenkov Island after Lieutenant Mikhail Annenkov, an officer on the expedition ship.

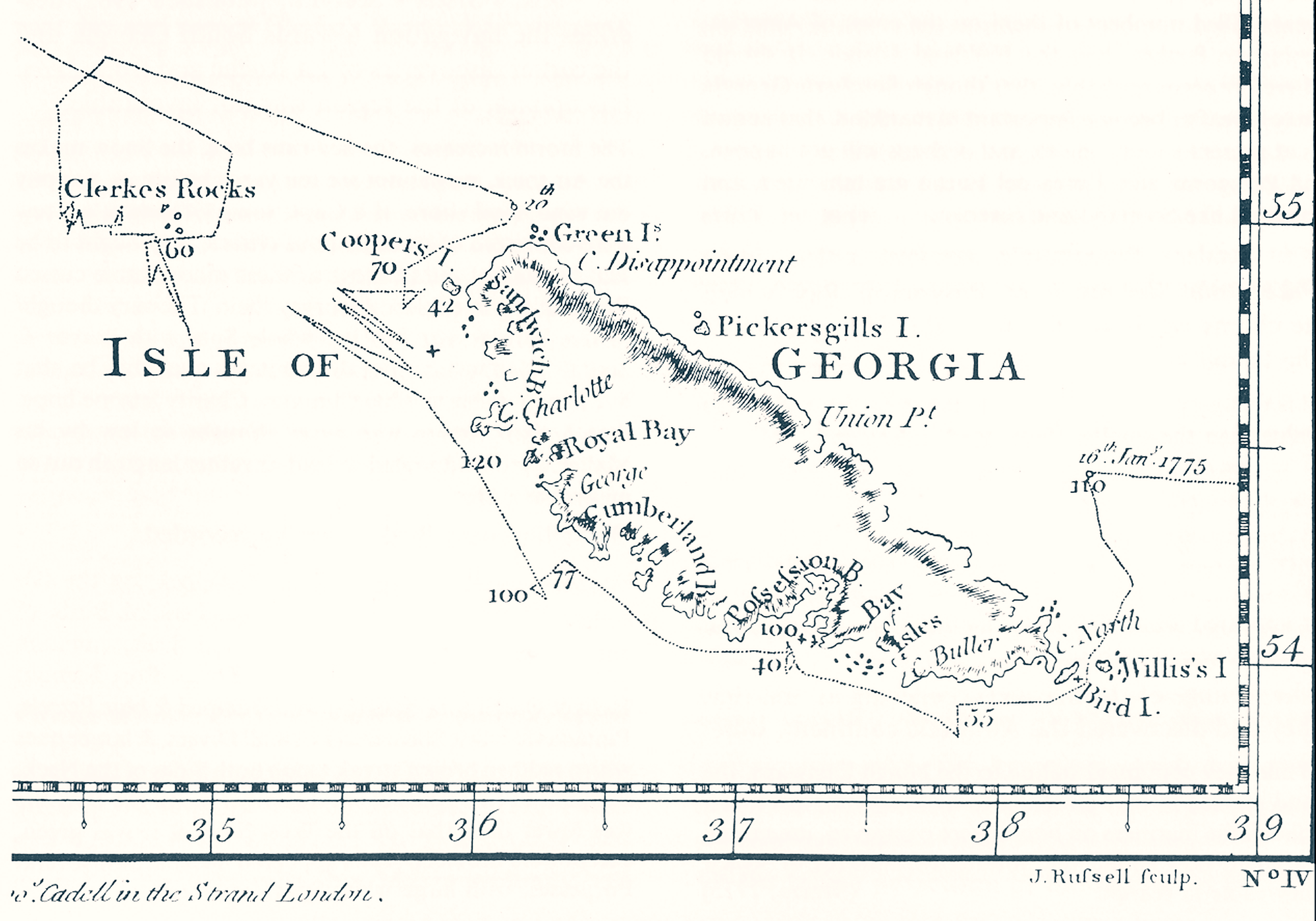
Cook's 1777 map of South Georgia (south up) shows the island now known as Annenkov Island as Pickersgill Island. What is now known as the Pickersgill Islands are unnamed.

Bellinghausen also discovered an archipelago 15 miles (24 km) to the southeast of Annenkov Island and erroneously charted the largest feature of the group as Pickersgill Island, previously sighted by Cook in 1775. Subsequent charts transferred the name "Pickersgill" from Annenkov Island, to this archipelago 15 miles (24 km) to its southeast.

== Wildlife ==
The Pickersgill Islands are home to a small colony of chinstrap penguins (approximately 30 nests).

== See also ==
- List of sub-Antarctic islands
- List of Antarctic islands north of 60° S
