= Hantzsch Island =

Island in Nunavut, Canada

- Location within Nunavut Location within Canada

Geography
- Location: Frobisher Bay
- Coordinates: 61°55′28″N 65°00′34″W
- Archipelago: Arctic Archipelago
- Area: 1 km^{2} (0.39 sq mi)
- Highest point: 150 m (490 ft)

Administration
- Canada
- Nunavut: Nunavut
- Region: Qikiqtaaluk

Demographics
- Population: Uninhabited

Hantzsch Island is an uninhabited island in the Qikiqtaaluk Region of Nunavut, Canada. It is located in Frobisher Bay off the southern tip of Baffin Island's Meta Incognita Peninsula and the northeastern tip of Edgell Island. The closest community is the community of Iqaluit, 270 km (170 mi) northwest of Hantzsch Island.

== Geography ==
The island is small and dome-shaped. Its habitat is characterized by coastal cliffs, grassy slopes, and a rugged shoreline.

== Fauna ==
Hantzsch Island is a Canadian Important Bird Area (#NU025), an International Biological Program site, and a Key Migratory Terrestrial Bird Site (NU Site 49). Notable bird species include black-legged kittiwakes, thick-billed murres, northern fulmars, and other colonial waterbirds and seabirds.

Beluga whales, bearded seal, ringed seal, harp seal, polar bears, and walrus frequent the area.

== History ==
The island is named in honour of Bernhard Hantzsch, a German ornithologist and Arctic researcher.
