= Wilson Island (Antarctica) =

Island in Antarctica

Wilson Island (66°27′S 110°34′E) is a mainly ice-free island lying between Browning Peninsula and Bosner Island in the Windmill Islands. First mapped from air photos taken by U.S. Navy Operation Highjump and Operation Windmill in 1947 and 1948. Named by the Advisory Committee on Antarctic Names (US-ACAN) for W. Stanley Wilson, biologist and member of the Wilkes Station party of 1961.

== See also ==
- List of antarctic and sub-antarctic islands
