= Nicholson Island (Antarctica) =

Nicholson Island (66°17′S 110°32′E) is the westernmost of the Bailey Rocks, lying 0.1 nautical miles (0.2 km) northeast of Budnick Hill in Newcomb Bay, Windmill Islands. First mapped from air photos taken by U.S. Navy Operation Highjump, 1946–47. Named by Antarctic Names Committee of Australia (ANCA) for R.T. Nicholson, senior carpenter, who took a leading part in the construction of nearby Casey Station in 1966.

== See also ==
- List of antarctic and sub-antarctic islands
