= Cape Darnley (South Georgia) =

Cape Darnley (54°27′S 36°49′W) is a cape at the southeast side of Jacobsen Bight on the south-central coast of South Georgia. The name dates back to about 1920 and was given for E.R. Darnley of the Colonial Office, Chairman of the Discovery Committee from 1923 to 1933.
