= Yelta =

Yelta may refer to:

- Yelta (tugboat)
- Yelta, South Australia
- Yelta, Victoria, Australia
