= Mosquito Fleet (South Australia) =

Fleet of small ships operating off South Australia in the 19th and 20th centuries

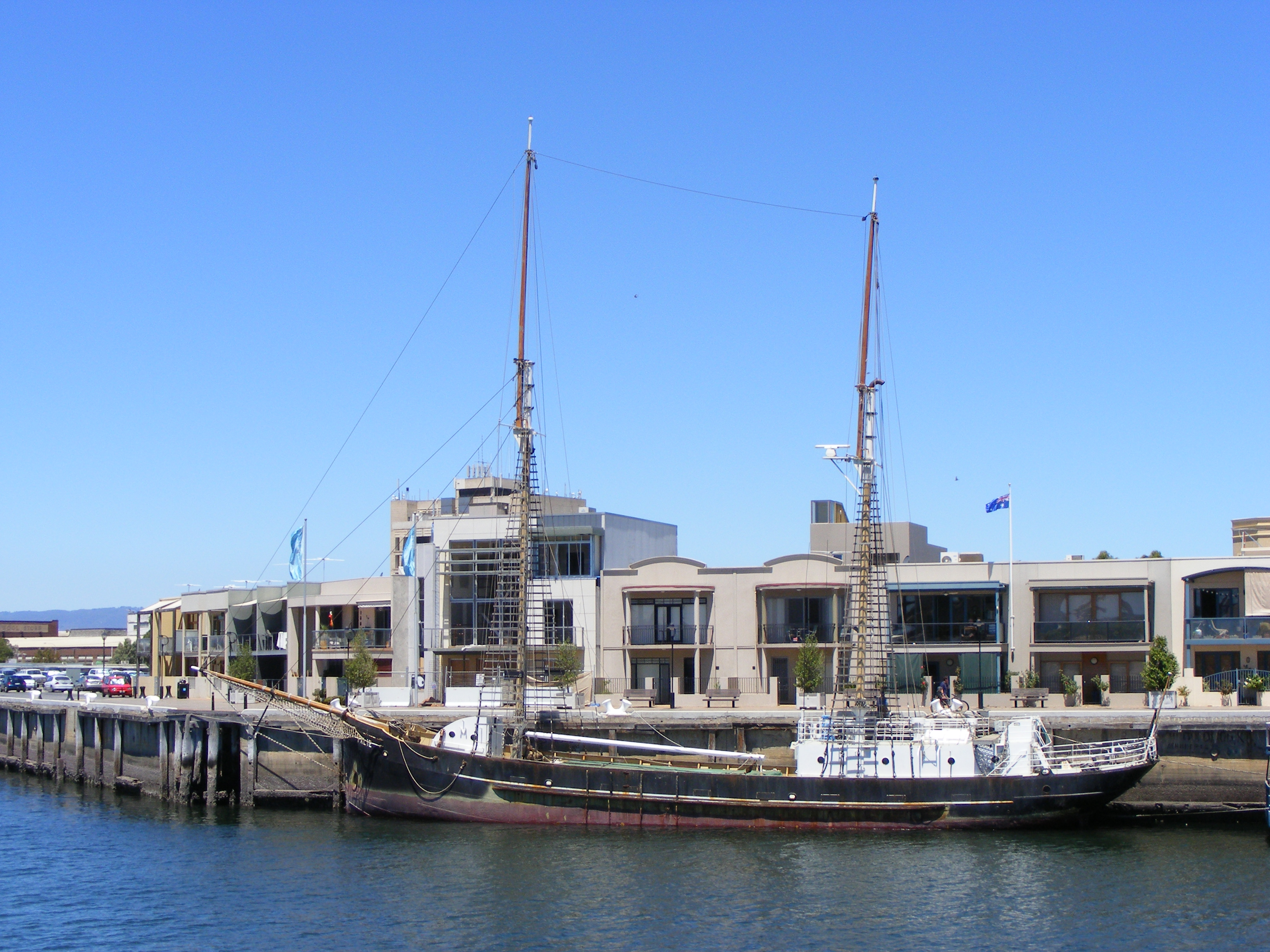
Falie at Port Adelaide

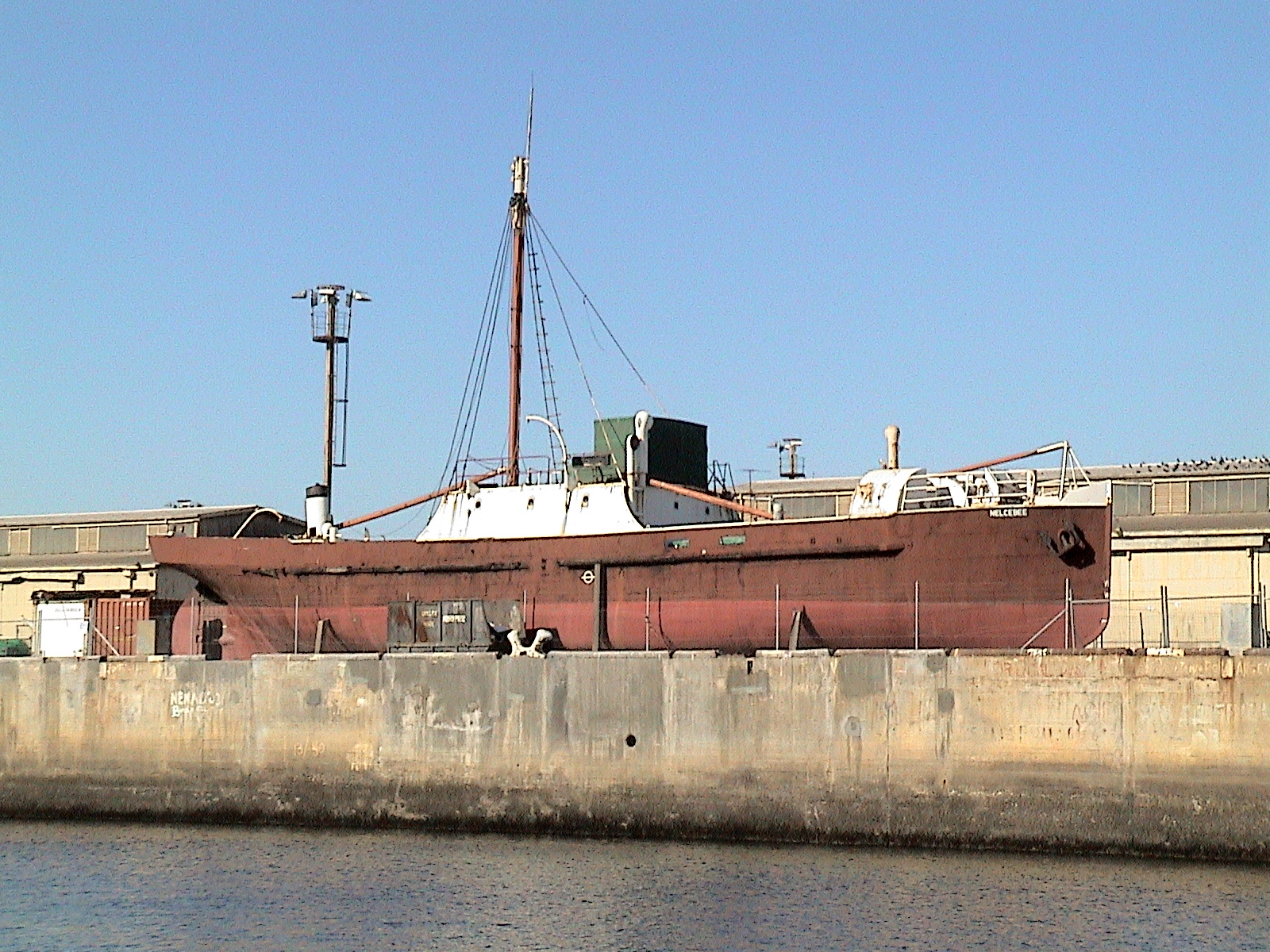
MV Nelcebee on hardstand at Dock 2, Port Adelaide

The Mosquito Fleet was the fleet of small ketches and schooners operating in the shallow coastal and gulf waters of South Australia, from the colony's establishment in 1836 until 1982.

From the State's main port of Port Adelaide they supplied goods to many isolated regional settlements, returning with cargoes of agricultural products (particularly wheat and wool) and minerals. They also played a role in lightering grain to load larger vessels offshore in deeper waters, the most famous example being to windjammers off Port Victoria, Spencer Gulf, which until 1949 marked the start of the Great Grain Race.

Among the last surviving ketches are the 1883 Nelcebee (owned by the South Australian Maritime Museum) and the 1919-built Falie.
