= MV Cape Don =

Lighthouse tender launched in 1963

Coordinates: 33°50′39″S 151°11′36″E

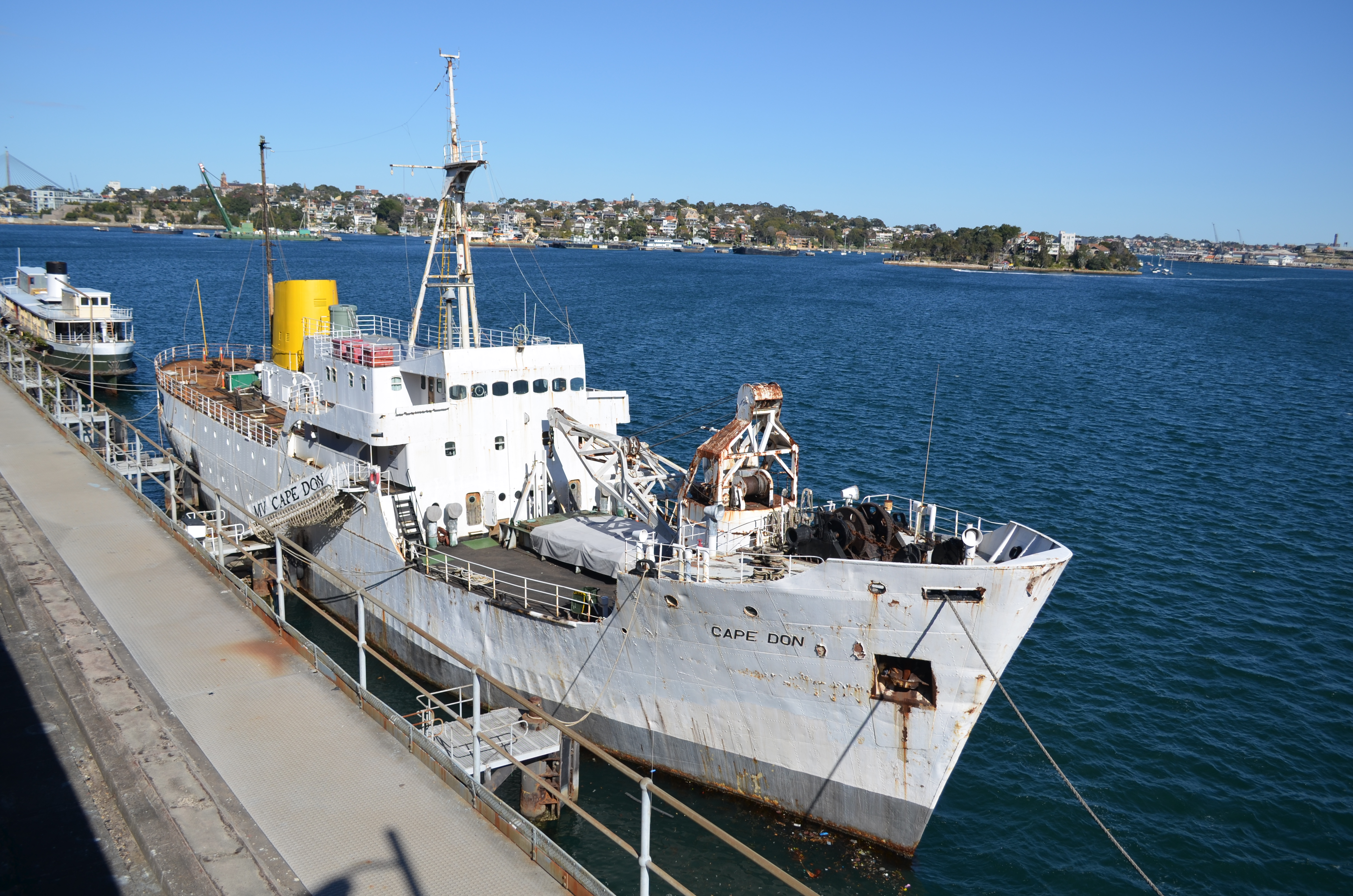
- Cape Don in Balls Head Bay in 2014

History

Australia
- Name: Cape Don
- Namesake: Cape Don Light
- Owner: Sea Heritage Foundation
- Route: Australian coast
- Builder: State Dockyard, Newcastle, New South Wales
- Laid down: 1962
- Launched: 28 May 1962
- Completed: 1963
- Maiden voyage: 29 March 1963
- In service: 1963
- Home port: Fremantle
- Identification: AHRV number: HV000208
- Status: Seized by the NSW Government on 17 October 2026

General characteristics
- Type: Lighthouse tender
- Tonnage: 2,103 GRT
- Length: 74.3 metres (244 ft)
- Beam: 12.8 metres (42 ft)
- Draught: 4.37 metres (14.3 ft)
- Installed power: 2,000 brake horsepower (1,500 kW)
- Propulsion: British Polar Engines M65T engine, 4-blade 2.6-metre (8 ft 6 in) variable-pitch propeller
- Speed: 12.5 knots (23.2 km/h)
- Complement: 39

MV Cape Don is a museum and training ship and former research vessel and lighthouse tender in Waverton, New South Wales, Australia. It is the only remaining Australian lighthouse supply ship and is listed on the Australian Register of Historic Vessels.

Built and launched by the State Dockyard at Newcastle, New South Wales in 1962 for the Commonwealth Lighthouse Service, it serviced the lighthouses, lightships and buoys of the Australian coast from 1963 to 1990. It was also used as a research vessel, and was involved in numerous high-profile scientific expeditions including the salvage of two of HMS Investigator's anchors.

Cape Don is berthed at the former coal loading wharf in Balls Head Bay, Waverton, New South Wales. It was being restored by the MV Cape Don Society, which is overseen by the Sea Heritage Foundation. However, in 2026 the New South Wales Government found it to be in an alarming state of decay and seized it, pending disposal.

== Design and construction ==
The Cape Don was built in Newcastle by the State Dockyard in 1962. It was designed, along with two identical sister ships Cape Moreton and Cape Pillar, by the Australian Shipping Board for the Commonwealth Lighthouse Service as a lighthouse tender. It was equipped with three lifeboats and a LARC-V on the port side.

Cape Don displaces 2,140 tonnes, measuring 76.25 m (250.2 ft) long and 12.8 m (42 ft) abeam. It is fitted with a 5-cylinder 2-stroke British Polar Engines M65T diesel engine, which drives a single 4-blade variable-pitch propeller.

== History ==
Cape Don was launched on 28 May 1962.

In 1979, a scientific team organised by the Victorian Institute of Marine Sciences used Cape Don to set up a marine monitoring station in the Bass Strait, making the first scientific study of the Strait.

In 1985, Cape Don transported the tower of the first Neptune Islands lighthouse to Port Adelaide for inclusion in the collection of the South Australian Maritime Museum.

From October 2022, TAFE NSW collaborated with the Sea Heritage Foundation to run maritime industry and hospitality courses aboard Cape Don.

The Museum and Art Gallery of the Northern Territory and Western Australian Museum each have one of Cape Don's workboats.

=== Recovery of Investigator's anchors ===
In 1973, Cape Don was used in an expedition to find and recover two of HMS Investigator's anchors in the Recherche Archipelago, Western Australia. The anchors were jettisoned by Matthew Flinders during rough weather whilst the ship was moored on Middle Island. The expedition to retrieve the anchors began in December 1972 and was run by members of the Underwater Explorers Club of South Australia. On 14 January 1973, the best bower anchor (starboard bow anchor) was located in Goose Island Bay, followed by a stream anchor (smaller anchor, typically used as a spare). The two anchors were retrieved on 19 January, with the best bower anchor sent to the South Australian Maritime Museum in Adelaide and the stream anchor sent to the National Museum of Australia in Canberra.

=== Seizure by NSW Government ===
Cape Don in Balls Head Bay, November 2026

On 17 October 2026, the NSW Government seized the vessel amid concerns that it was in a dangerous state of decay and could easily sink, possibly flooded through a rusted hole by wash from a passing ship, which could wreak major environmental and economic damage.

Tanker reversing close to Cape Don, November 2026
