= Balls Head Bay =

Bay in Sydney, Australia

Coordinates: 33°51′S 151°12′E

Balls Head Bay, formerly known as Oyster Cove, Wollstonecraft Bay, Sugarworks Bay, Powder Works Bay and Kerosene Bay, is a bay located to the west of the Waverton Peninsula, west of Balls Head and to the east of Berry Island, on the north of Sydney Harbour, Sydney, New South Wales, Australia.

Some of the older alternative names for the bay refer to industries that were once situated on its foreshore. There was a sugar factory, Robey's Sugar Works, there from around 1857 to 1859. There was a facility that produced kerosene from oil shale and handled imported 'case oil', Australian Mineral Oil Company, there from 1865 to 1868. There was an explosives factory, Neokratine Safety Explosives Company, there from 1889 to 1891. The site of these earlier enterprises was later occupied by a gasworks owned by the North Shore Gas Company, from 1917 to 1987. After coal gas production ceased, during the period 1971–1973, the artist Brett Whitely used the disused coal store building as a studio for creating large artworks. The site is now the residential complex, 'Wondakiah', with some public open space. Some of the old gasworks buildings have been repurposed as part of the residential complex.

Balls Head Bay contains the former Balls Head Coal Loader. Parts of the disused loader site have been converted to public space—now known as the Coal Loader Centre for Sustainability—with the derelict loading wharf remaining safely off-limits. The site has interpretive signage that provides information covering in detail the history of the site. In June 2021, the coal loader site was added to the NSW Heritage Register. It is now the home of the museum and training ship MV Cape Don.

The naval base HMAS Waterhen is located within the bay.

Ships were broken up and burnt to the waterline in the bay. One such ship was the Lalla Rookh, which was broken up at Kerosene Bay in 1898 after it caught fire in November 1897. The Australasian Underwater Cultural Heritage Database describes her as a 147-ton brig, 29.9 metres (98 ft) long. (See Lalla Rookh (ship).)

== See also ==
- Balls Head Reserve
- Balls Head Coal Loader
