= Lalla Rookh (1848 ship) =

1848 Scottish built clipper

History
- Name: Lalla Rookh
- Port of registry: ?, Sydney
- Route: Australasia, East Indies, Pacific
- Builder: Peterhead, Aberdeenshire
- Launched: 1848
- Fate: Broken up 1898 in Sydney.

General characteristics
- Class & type: Brig
- Tonnage: 147 net register tons (NRT)
- Length: 98 feet (30 m)
- Draft: 12.2 feet (3.7 m)

Lalla Rookh was a clipper/brig variously recorded as 184 tons and 147 tons, built in Peterhead, Aberdeenshire, Scotland in 1848. She was described as one of the "new Aberdeen clippers".

She took settlers to the colony of Natal (now part of South Africa) in 65 days, the fastest passage thus far achieved. She was used for trading among the Australian colonies, including several journeys between Port Adelaide, Melbourne, Sydney and Newcastle, New South Wales.

She left Deal, Kent under Captain Henderson for Port Natal on 24 February 1849.

Lalla Rookh, described as a 155/6-ton brig, was recorded under Captain P. Milner arriving from Mauritius in January 1850, is subsequently mentioned in several shipping reports in New South Wales and Victoria until late 1852 and in 1853 under Captain Twomey (one to Wellington, New Zealand). A few passengers are listed for all of these voyages.

In October 1856 she sailed from Sydney in ballast (empty of cargo) to Calcutta under Captain Orr, and is shown arriving from Calcutta on 2 March 1857, with goods including patna rice. She traded the East Indies, Mauritius and West Coast(?) for a period, the ship was advertised for sale in the Geelong Advertiser in May 1859, after having been overhauled, refitted and recoppered. Her tonnage at this time was "184 tons register, 270 burden".

She departed for Fiji in October 1859, and is recorded as arriving in Hobson's Bay, Melbourne, in April 1860. On 19 November 1860 the brig, sailing under a New Zealand flag, was driven ashore and damaged at Port Albert, Victoria, on a voyage from Wellington to Melbourne, but was able to be refloated. (Note: See also List of shipwrecks in November 1860.)

In May 1865 she left Sydney for the South Sea Islands, and in December 1868 for New Caledonia.

According to the Australasian Underwater Cultural Heritage Database (AUCHD), after catching fire on 30 November 1897, Lalla Rookh (then registered in Sydney) was broken up in 1898 at Kerosene Bay (now Balls Head Bay) in Sydney Harbour. The AUCHD record describes her as a 147-ton brig, 29.9 metres (98 ft) long. However, in April 1898 Lalla Rookh was reported as having sunk in 25 feet (7.6 m) of water after striking a dolphin near the head of Darling Harbour. Before this she had been used as a lighter in the coal trade up and down the coast, owned by a Mr Byrnes. Her tonnage was reported as 220 tons in this report.
