= MV Nelcebee =

Australian schooner and museum ship

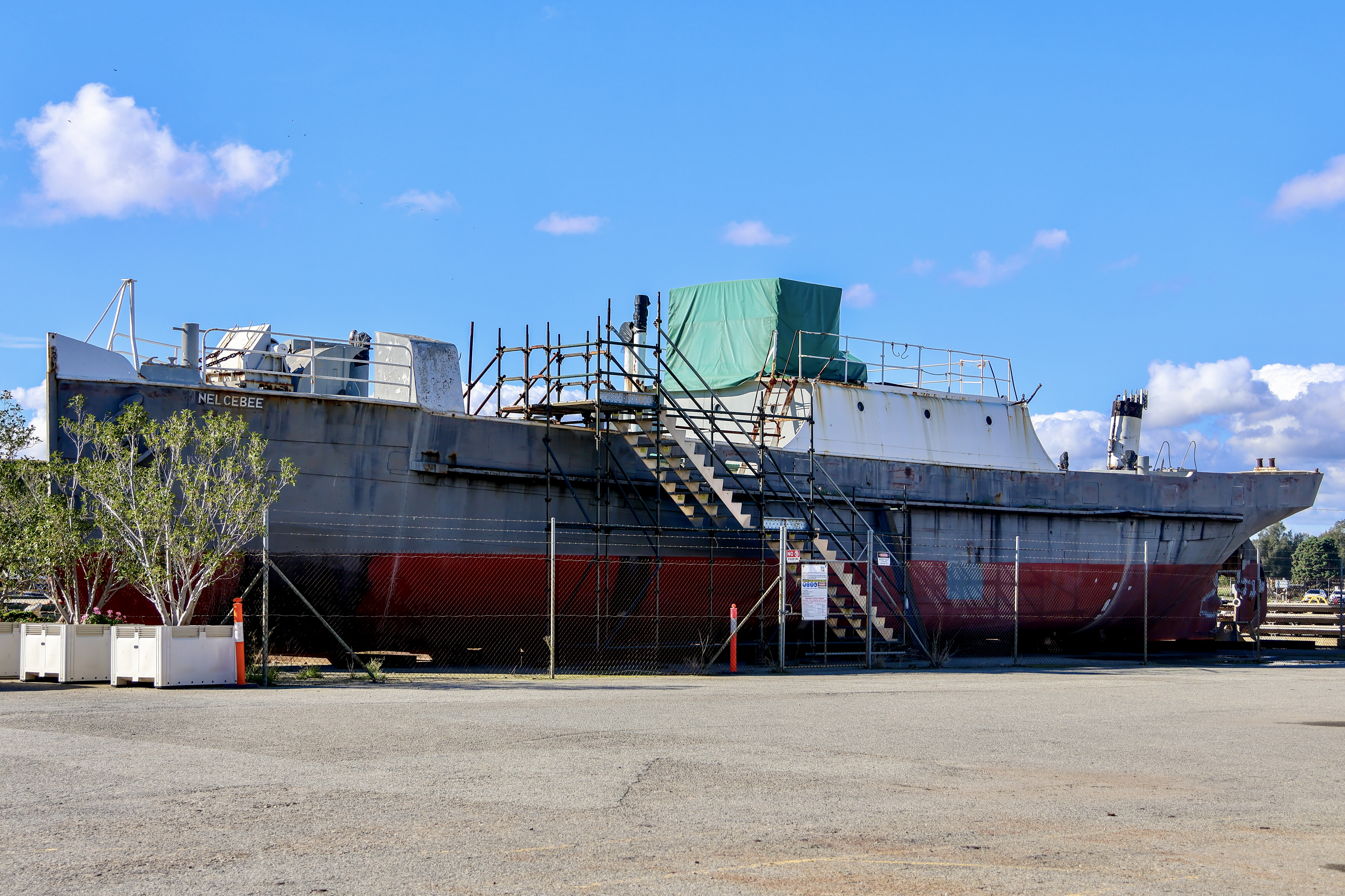
- MV Nelcebee in 2026

History

Australia
- Name: Nelcebee
- Namesake: Nelcebee after the Aboriginal name for a spring at Port Pirie
- Owner: Captain Williams of Port Adelaide (1983-unknown), unknown (-1962), R Fricker and Company (1962-1982)
- Builder: T.B. Seath & Co. at Rutherglen, Scotland
- Cost: £7,000
- Commissioned: 1883; 143 years ago
- Decommissioned: 1982
- Fate: To South Australian Maritime Museum
- Status: Museum Ship

General characteristics
- Type: Steam tug and lighter (1883-1927) Motor ketch (1927-)
- Length: 32.61 m (107 ft 0 in)
- Beam: 5.69 m (18 ft 8 in)
- Draft: 2.79 m (9 ft 2 in) metres
- Installed power: Steam (1883-1927) Diesel (1927-)
- Sail plan: Ketch (1927-)

MV Nelcebee is an auxiliary schooner that served the South Australian coastal trade from 1883 to 1982.

== Operational history ==
Nelcebee was built in at Rutherglen in Scotland by T.B. Seath & Co. It was assembled and tested before being broken into parts and shipped to South Australia where it was reassembled by Thomas Cruickshank in Port Adelaide.

Nelcebee commenced service as a tug and lighter at Port Pirie, gradually being replaced in its tug role with improved designs, until it was sold in 1927.

Nelcebee was then refitted with a diesel engine, and given two masts. It commenced operation in the South Australian coastal trade from 1928 serving Spencer Gulf and Gulf St Vincent ports and carrying loads such as wheat, gypsum, and minerals. In 1962 the vessel was sold to R Fricker and Company and commenced working to supply Kangaroo Island until it was retired in 1982.

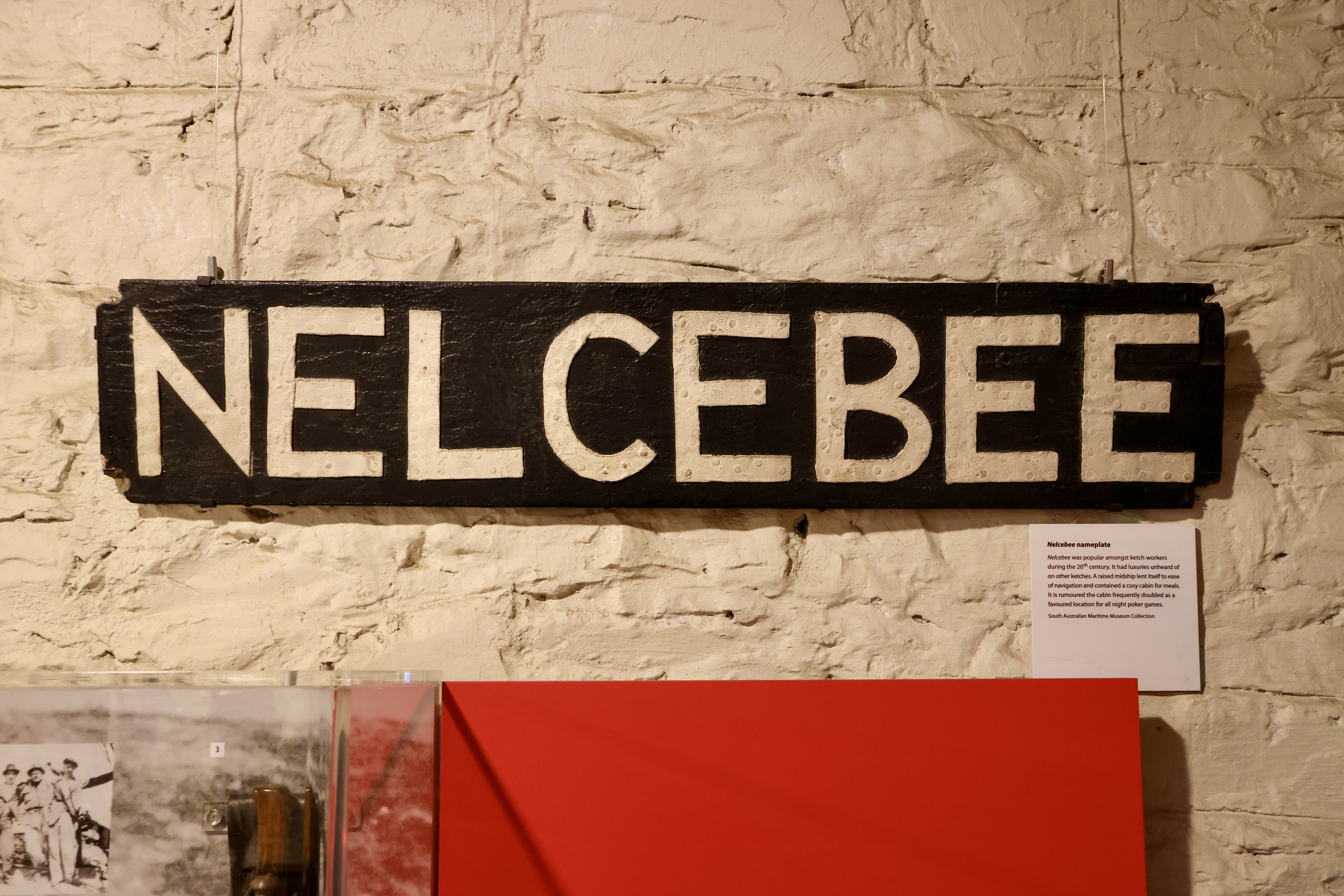
Nelcebee nameplate in the South Australian Maritime Museum

Nelcebee was the second to last ketch operating in the South Australian coastal trade along with Falie. Upon retirement, it was the third oldest vessel on Lloyds Register of Shipping. It is now held by the South Australian Maritime Museum.

In 2017, Nelcebee was one of the ships considered in a study funded by Renewal SA about "a strategy for berthing or locating historic ships and vessels within the inner harbour of Port Adelaide."
