= List of shipwrecks in November 1860 =

The list of shipwrecks in November 1860 includes ships sunk, foundered, grounded, or otherwise lost during November 1860.

== 1 November ==
List of shipwrecks: 1 November 1860
Ship	State	Description
Apollo	United Kingdom	The barque was wrecked near Vigo, Spain. Her twelve crew survived. She was on a voyage from Sines, Portugal to London.
Indian	United Kingdom	The barque was wrecked near Constanţa, Ottoman Empire, Her ten crew were rescued. She was on a voyage from Odesa to Hartlepool, County Durham.
Louis	Netherlands	The barque ran aground on the Malang Hui Reef, east of Lepar Island, Netherlands East Indies. She was on a voyage from Newcastle upon Tyne, Northumberland, United Kingdom to Singapore, Straits Settlements. She sank on 3 November.
Plantagenet	United Kingdom	The steamship ran aground at Port Henderson, Jamaica. She was on a voyage from Liverpool, Lancashire to Sydney, New South Wales. She was refloated on 11 November and sailed for the Spanish Main.
Queen	United Kingdom	The steamship was driven ashore at Coulderton, Cumberland. She was refloated and taken in to Whitehaven, Cumberland.

== 2 November ==
List of shipwrecks: 2 November 1860
Ship	State	Description
H. M. Hall	United States	The steamship suffered a boiler explosion. Thirty people were killed and fifty were injured. She was on a voyage from Memphis, Tennessee to New Orleans, Louisiana.
Navigator	United Kingdom	The ship was driven ashore and wrecked 2 nautical miles (3.7 km) east of Wells-next-the-Sea, Norfolk. Her crew were rescued. She was on a voyage from South Shields, County Durham to London.
William and Jane	United Kingdom	The ship was driven ashore at the Landguard Fort, Felixtowe, Suffolk. She was on a voyage from London to Sunderland, County Durham. She was refloated and taken in to Harwich, Essex.

== 3 November ==
List of shipwrecks: 3 November 1860
Ship	State	Description
Anna Catherine	Stettin	The brig suffered an onboard explosion and caught fire at North Shields, County Durham, United Kingdom. The fire was extinguished but broke out again the next day and the vessel was scuttled. One crew member was severely injured.
Beatrice	United Kingdom	The steamship was driven ashore at Höganäs, Sweden. She was on a voyage from Hull, Yorkshire to Helsingborg, Sweden.
Blessing	United Kingdom	The smack was driven ashore at Rattray Head, Aberdeenshire. She was refloated and taken in to Peterhead, Aberdeenshire.
New Mary	United Kingdom	The ship was driven ashore at Lowestoft, Suffolk. She was on a voyage form Hull, Yorkshire to Gibraltar. She had been refloated by 7 November and taken in to Lowestoft in a leaky condition.
Terra Novian	(United Kingdom of Great Britain and Ireland) British North America	The ship was abandoned in the Atlantic Ocean. Her crew were rescued.
Tonning	United Kingdom	The paddle steamer suffered a boiler explosion and was severely damaged in the North Sea with some loss of life. There were eleven survivors. She was taken in to Lowestoft, Suffolk.

== 4 November ==
List of shipwrecks: 4 November 1860
Ship	State	Description
Ann Merrett	United Kingdom	The brigantine ran aground and sank off Arichat, Nova Scotia, British North America. She was on a voyage from Boston, Massachusetts, United States to Pictou, Nova Scotia.
Flower, and Margaret	(United Kingdom of Great Britain and Ireland) Isle of Man; United Kingdom	The smack Flower collided with the schooner Margaret in Ramsey Sound. Both vessels came ashore on Ramsey Island, Pembrokeshire and were wrecked.

== 5 November ==
List of shipwrecks: 5 November 1860
Ship	State	Description
Alfred Monie	France	The schooner was driven ashore on Öland, Sweden. She was on a voyage from Riga, Russia to Dunkirk, Nord.
Alpha	United Kingdom	The barque foundered in the Bay of Biscay (47°28′N 10°11′W). Her twelve crew were rescued by the barque Alciope (United Kingdom). Alpha was on a voyage from Cardiff, Glamorgan to Alexandria, Egypt.
Hoffnung	Kingdom of Hanover	The ship was wrecked on Anholt, Denmark. Her crew were rescued. She was on a voyage from Middlesbrough, Yorkshire, United Kingdom to "Leerham", Sweden.
Kyle Spangler	United States	Photo mosaic of the wreck of Kyle Spangler, published in February 2013. The schooner sank in Lake Huron off the coast of Michigan after her bow was crushed in a collision with the schooner Racine (United States). Her crew survived.
Marie Victoire	France	The schooner ran aground on the Bosse du Chenal Reef and foundered. Her crew were rescued. She was on a voyage from swansea, Glamorgan, United Kingdom to La Rochelle, Charente-Inférieure.
Runswell	United Kingdom	The ship was driven ashore on Hogland, Russia. She was on a voyage from Hull, Yorkshire to "Wyborg". She was later refloated and taken in to "Wyborg".
Sarah	United Kingdom	The schooner was abandoned off The Manacles, Cornwall. Her crew were rescued. She was on a voyage from a Welsh port to Plymouth, Devon.

== 6 November ==
List of shipwrecks: 6 November 1860
Ship	State	Description
Ann Nelson	United Kingdom	The barque was damaged by fire at Saint Thomas, Virgin Islands. She was on a voyage from Liverpool, Lancashire to Belize City, British Honduras.
Bonne Aimée	France	The schooner ran aground on the Haisborough Sands, in the North Sea off the coast of Norfolk, United Kingdom. She was on a voyage from Gothenburg, Sweden to Saint-Malo, Ille-et-Vilaine. She was refloated and assisted in to Lowestoft, Suffolk, United Kingdom in a waterlogged condition.
British Empire	United Kingdom	The full-rigged ship foundered in the Atlantic Ocean 450 nautical miles (830 km) south west of São Miguel Island, Azores. Her 36 crew survived. She was on a voyage from Callao, Peru to Queenstown, County Cork.
Candia	United Kingdom	The steamship, which had suffered a fractured propeller shaft in the Red Sea, was beached on the Atakah Reef, in the Gulf of Suez to enable repairs to be made. She was refloated on 6 January 1861.
China	United States	The ship was destroyed by fire at sea. Her crew were rescued by Ocean Bride (United Kingdom). China was on a voyage from New Orleans, Louisiana to Liverpool, Lancashire, United Kingdom.
Lola Montez	(United Kingdom of Great Britain and Ireland) Jamaica	The drogher was wrecked on a reef off Falmouth.
Henriette Hanman	Netherlands	The ship was driven ashore on Terschelling, Friesland. She was on a voyage from Riga, Russia to Amsterdam, North Holland.
Rapide	Belgium	The sloop was driven ashore at Horsey, Norfolk with the loss of two of her crew. She was on a voyage from Sunderland, County Durham, United Kingdom to Seville, Spain.

== 7 November ==
List of shipwrecks: 7 November 1860
Ship	State	Description
Evangelistra	Greece	The brig was wrecked at Sulina, Ottoman Empire. Her crew were rescued.
Kyle Spangler	United States	Kyle Spangler in 2015. The wooden schooner was loaded with a cargo of corn when the schooner Racine (United States) accidentally rammed her in Lake Huron off the coast of Michigan. She sank in 180 feet (55 m) of water at 45.383611°N 83.435278°W.
Mary	United Kingdom	The ship was wrecked at Sulina, Ottoman Empire. Her crew were rescued.
Mayflower	United Kingdom	The brig ran aground on the Whiting Sand, in The Wash and was severely damaged. She was on a voyage from King's Lynn, Norfolk to Seaham, County Durham. Mayflower was refloated and found to be severely leaky. She put back to King's Lynn.
Phoenix	United Kingdom	The barque was wrecked in the Magdalen Islands, Nova Scotia, British North America. Her fourteen crew survived. She was on a voyage from Quebec City, Province of Canada, British North America to Waterford.

== 8 November ==
List of shipwrecks: 8 November 1860
Ship	State	Description
Alfred	United Kingdom	The schooner was driven ashore near Étaples, Pas-de-Calais, France. She was on a voyage from Sunderland, County Durham to Étaples. She was consequently condemned.
Black Prince	United Kingdom	The steamship was run down and sunk by the steamship Araxes (United Kingdom) 68 nautical miles (126 km) north of Cape St. Vincent, Portugal. Her crew were rescued by Araxes. Black Prince was on a voyage from Gibraltar to London.
Caroline	(United Kingdom of Great Britain and Ireland) Gibraltar	The brig was wrecked at the mouth of the San Francisco River. Her eight crew were rescued. She was on a voyage from Rio de Janeiro, Brazil to Gibraltar.
Edward Bilton	United Kingdom	The snow was wrecked at Campbeltown, Prince Edward Island, British North America. Her eleven crew survived. She was on a voyage from Shediac, New Brunswick, British North America to Gloucester.
Macassar	(United Kingdom of Great Britain and Ireland) British North America	The brig was sighted off Deal, Kent whilst on a voyage from London to Boston, Massachusetts, United States. No further trace, presumed foundered with the loss of all hands.
Mary	Norway	The schooner was wrecked at Sulina, Ottoman Empire Her crew were rescued.
Vine	United Kingdom	The ship ran aground on the Gunfleet Sand, in the North Sea off the coast of Essex. She was on a voyage from Arkhangelsk, Russia to a British port. She was refloated on 15 November and taken in to Gravesend, Kent.

== 9 November ==
List of shipwrecks: 9 November 1860
Ship	State	Description
Alma	France	The brig was wrecked on Ouessant, Finistère, France. Her crew were rescued. She was on a voyage from Bordeaux, Gironde to Fosdyke, Lincolnshire, United Kingdom.
Bassorah	United Kingdom	The full-rigged ship sprang a leak and foundered in the Bay of Biscay. Her 23 crew were rescued by the brig San Francisco (Norway). Bussorah was on a voyage from Liverpool, Lancashire to Gibraltar.
D. L. Clinch	United States	The ship was wrecked in the San Juan Islands, Washington Territory.
Gezina	Hamburg	The barque was abandoned in the Bay of Biscay (47°19′N 7°25′W). Her crew were rescued by the barque Grefve (Russia). Gezina was on a voyage from Santander, Spain to Liverpool, Lancashire, United Kingdom. She was discovered on 13 November by Lady Sandys (United Kingdom) and set afire.
Margaret Allen	United Kingdom	The ship was beached at Innistyre, County Mayo. She was on a voyage from Grangemouth, Stirlingshire to Marseille, Bouches-du-Rhône, France.
Siegfried	Stettin	The barque ran aground off the coast of Kent, United Kingdom. She was on a voyage from Stettin to Bristol, Gloucestershire, United Kingdom. She was refloated and assisted in to Sheerness, Kent in a waterlogged condition.

== 10 November ==
List of shipwrecks: 10 November 1860
Ship	State	Description
Erne	Norway	The ship was driven ashore on Sylt, Kingdom of Hanover.
Flying Fish	United Kingdom	The brig was wrecked in Filey Bay. Her five crew were rescued by the Whitby Lifeboat. She was on a voyage from South Shields, County Durham to London.
Hannah	United Kingdom	The ship foundered in the North Sea off Staithes, Yorkshire. Her crew were rescued.
Jeune Reine	France	The lugger ran aground on the Newcombe Sand, in the Bristol Channel. She floated off and came ashore on the Swash in a severely damaged condition. She was on a voyage from Nantes, Loire-Inférieure to Bristol, Gloucestershire, United Kingdom.
John Baskie	United Kingdom	The ship was driven ashore in Cloughey Bay, County Down. She was on a voyage from Newport, Monmouthshire to Belfast, County Antrim.
Robert and Mary	United Kingdom	The schooner ran aground on the White Middle Sand, in the North Sea off the coast of Lincolnshire. She was on a voyage from Sunderland, County Durham to Hamburg. She was refloated and beached at Grimsby, Lincolnshire the next day.
Ruby	United Kingdom	The brig was abandoned in the North Sea 10 nautical miles (19 km) south of Flamborough Head, Yorkshire. Her crew were rescued. She was on a voyage from Newcastle upon Tyne, Northumberland to London.
San Georgio	Greece	The brig was wrecked at Sulina, Ottoman Empire. Her crew were rescued.
Silver Star	United States	The clipper was wrecked at Jarvis Island.

== 11 November ==
List of shipwrecks: 11 November 1860
Ship	State	Description
Ataxerxes	United Kingdom	The ship was driven ashore at Horsey, Norfolk. She was refloated on 15 November and taken in to Great Yarmouth, Norfolk.
Benedict	United Kingdom	The ship was beached at Grimsby, Lincolnshire.
Forest King	United States	The ship departed from New Orleans, Louisiana for Bath, Maine. No further trace, presumed foundered with the loss of all hands.
Hannah	United Kingdom	The schooner sprang a leak and foundered in the North Sea off the coast of Yorkshire. Her crew were rescued by the fishing lugger Blue Jacket (United Kingdom). Hannah was on a voyage from Hartlepool, County Durham to King's Lynn, Norfolk.
James	United Kingdom	The ship was beached at Grimsby.
Lena	United Kingdom	The brig was wrecked at Sulina, Ottoman Empire. Her seven crew were rescued. She was on a voyage from Galaţi, Ottoman Empire to a British port.
Mary Ann	United Kingdom	The brig collided with another brig and was beached at Grimsby. She was refloated and taken in to Grimsby, where she sank.
Olivia	United Kingdom	The schooner was driven ashore at Sulina. She was on a voyage from Newcastle upon Tyne, Northumberland to Sulina. She had been refloated by 24 November.

== 12 November ==
List of shipwrecks: 12 November 1860
Ship	State	Description
Arabia	United Kingdom	The ship was destroyed by fire at Melbourne, Victoria.
Corinthia, and Trebizon	United Kingdom	Corinthia was driven into Trebizond at Odesa. Both vessels were severely damaged.
Cue	(United Kingdom of Great Britain and Ireland) British Guiana	The schooner sank off Berbice. She was on a voyage from Berbice to Demerara.
Donna Isabella	Imperial Brazilian Navy	The corvette was wrecked 6 nautical miles (11 km) south of Cape Spartel, Morocco with the loss of 36 of her 151 crew. Survivors were rescued by HMS Argus (Royal Navy). Donna Isabella was on a voyage from Marseille, Bouches-du-Rhône, France to Lisbon, Portugal.
Geertje	Netherlands	The ship was abandoned in the Atlantic Ocean with the loss of two of her crew. Survivors were rescued by Pauline (United Kingdom). Geertje was on a voyage from Newcastle upon Tyne, Northumberland, United Kingdom to Livorno, Kingdom of Sardinia.
Gladiator	United Kingdom	The full-rigged ship was driven ashore and wrecked between "Cape Pedrone" and the mouth of the Bushman's River, Cape Colony with the loss of at least six of the 45 people on board. There were at least 35 survivors. She was on a voyage from Bombay, India to Liverpool, Lancashire.
Harmony	United Kingdom	The schooner ran aground on the Goodwin Sands, Kent. She was on a voyage from South Shields, County Durham to Weymouth, Dorset. She was refloated the next day and taken in to Ramsgate, Kent in a severely leaky condition.
Mizzah	United Kingdom	The ship ran aground on the Haisborough Sands, in the North Sea off the coast of Norfolk. She was on a voyage from South Shields to Corfu, United States of the Ionian Islands.
Queen of Commerce	United Kingdom	The ship was run into and severely damaged at Odesa.
Saint Yves	France	The brig was destroyed by fire off Cape Villano, Spain. . Her crew were rescued by the schooner Catharicus (United Kingdom). Saint Yves was on a voyage from Cardiff, Glamorgan, United Kingdom to Gibraltar.
Savannah	United Kingdom	The smack was driven ashore at Souter Point, Northumberland.
Thetis	United Kingdom	The ship ran aground on the Grand Lejon, in the English Channel. She was on a voyage from Saint-Brieuc, Côtes-du-Nord to Plymouth, Devon. She was refloated and put in to Jersey, Channel Islands in a leaky condition.
Victor	France	The brig was abandoned off Alicante, Spain. Her crew survived. She was on a voyage from Marseille to Dublin, United Kingdom.

== 13 November ==
List of shipwrecks: 13 November 1860
Ship	State	Description
Caledonia	Sweden	The barque ran aground on the Gunfleet Sand, in the North Sea off the coast of Essex. United Kingdom. She was refloated and taken in to Sheerness, Kent, United Kingdom in a severely leaky condition.
Caryles	France	The brig foundered 6 nautical miles (11 km) off Penmarc'h, Finistère. Her crew survived. She was on a voyage from Sunderland, County Durham, United Kingdom to Nantes, Loire-Inférieure.
Emma	United Kingdom	The brig ran aground at Manukan Island, Spanish East Indies. She was on a voyage from Manukan Island to New Plymouth, New Zealand.
Frederick H	United Kingdom	The ship was driven ashore and wrecked at Hartland Point, Devon. She was on a voyage from London to Cardiff, Glamorgan.
Lindisfarne	United Kingdom	The ship ran aground on the Dulas Rocks, off the coast of Anglesey. She was on a voyage from Liverpool, Lancashire to Pernambuco, Brazil. She was refloated and put back to Liverpool.
Renovatia	United Kingdom	The schooner ran aground on the Middle Sand, in the Humber. She was on a voyage from Newcastle upon Tyne, Northumberland to Seville, Spain. She was later refloated and resumed her voyage, but put in to Great Yarmouth, Norfolk in a leaky condition on 20 November.
Star of Hope	United Kingdom	The ship was driven ashore on Faial Island, Azores. She was on a voyage from Callao, Peru to Queenstown, County Cork.
Victory	France	The brig was abandoned off Alicante, Spain. Her crew survived. She was on a voyage from Marseille, Bouches-du-Rhône to Dublin, United Kingdom.

== 14 November ==
List of shipwrecks: 14 November 1860
Ship	State	Description
A. C. Merryman	United States	The bark ran aground on Santa Rosa Island, Florida. Though undamaged, she was too far up the beach to be pulled off, and was stripped.
Arthur Wyatt	United Kingdom	The ship was driven ashore at St. Anthony's Lighthouse, Falmouth, Cornwall. She was on a voyage from Hamburg to Swansea, Glamorgan.
Aurora	Spain	The brig was driven ashore and wrecked in Druidge Bay, Northumberland, United Kingdom. She was on a voyage from Kristiansand, Norway to Santander.
Clementhe	United Kingdom	The brig ran aground on the Insand, on the coast of County Durham.
Cruiser	United Kingdom	The paddle tug was run into by the brig Mina (United Kingdom) and sank at North Shields, County Durham. Subsequently refloated, repaired and returned to service.
Duchess of Sutherland	United Kingdom	The ship was run into by a schooner at North Shields and was severely damaged.
Eliza and Ann	United Kingdom	The schooner was driven onto the Batten Rocks, on the coast of Devon. She was on a voyage from Cardiff, Glamorgan to Caen, Calvados, France.
Elizabeth Ann	United Kingdom	The smack was wrecked at Lyme Regis, Dorset, England. Her three crew were rescued by the Lyme Regis Lifeboat. She was on a voyage from Newcastle upon Tyne, Northumberland to Lyme Regis. She was refloated and taken in to Lyme Regis.
Hinde	United Kingdom	The brig was driven ashore between Wells-next-the-Sea and Blakeney, Norfolk. She was on a voyage from South Shields, County Durham to London. She was refloated and resumed her voyage.
Margaret Evans	United States	The ship ran aground at New York. She was on a voyage from New York to London. She was refloated and found to be severely leaking.
Murray	United Kingdom	The schooner was run into and sank in the North Sea off the coast of Essex. Her crew were rescued. She was on a voyage from Rochester, Kent to Newcastle upon Tyne.
Seaflower	United Kingdom	The smack was wrecked near Aberthaw, Glamorgan with the loss of all hands.
Sovereign of the Seas	United Kingdom	The schooner capsized at Chezzetcook, Nova Scotia, British North America. She was on a voyage from Halifax to Jedore.
Union	United Kingdom	The ship collided with Dudgeon and Spectator (both United Kingdom) and foundered in the North Sea 6 nautical miles (11 km) off the Dudgeon Sand. Her crew were rescued by the schooner Prudent (France).

== 15 November ==
List of shipwrecks: 15 November 1860
Ship	State	Description
Agenoria	United Kingdom	The brig struck the Dudgeon Sand, in the North Sea and foundered. Her six crew were rescued by Gem (United Kingdom). Agenoria was on a voyage from Sunderland, County Durham to the Nieuw Diep.
Ann	United Kingdom	The brig ran aground on the Cork Sand or the Gunfleet Sand, in the North Sea off the coast of Essex. She was refloated but consequently sank in the Wallet Channel. Her crew were rescued. She was on a voyage from Hartlepool, County Durham to London.
Dove	United Kingdom	The ship ran aground on the Dowsing Sand, in the North Sea off the coast of Norfolk. She was on a voyage from Newcastle upon Tyne, Northumberland to Rotterdam, South Holland, Netherlands. She was refloated with assistance from the steamship Port Mulgrave and towed in to Grimsby, Lincolnshire.
Edith	United Kingdom	The ship collided with Van (United Kingdom) and was abandoned with the presumed loss of a passenger. Survivors were rescued by Van. Edith was on a voyage from Rotterdam, South Holland, Netherlands to London. She came ashore at Aldeburgh, Suffolk.
Gloria	Kingdom of the Two Sicilies	The ship was wrecked on the Gunnesand, in the North Sea off the coast of Belgium. Her crew were rescued. She was on a voyage from Naples to "La Nouvelle".
Grypskerk	Netherlands	The ship ran aground on the Longsand, in the North Sea off the coast of Essex. She was refloated and taken in to The Downs.
John Williams	United Kingdom	The ship ran aground in the Cattewater. She was on a voyage from Portmadoc, Caernarfonshire to King's Lynn, Norfolk.
Magnet	Grand Duchy of Mecklenburg-Schwerin	The brigantine sprang a leak and foundered in the North Sea. Her crew were rescued by the steamship Harriet (United Kingdom). Magnet was on a voyage from Middlesbrough, Yorkshire, United Kingdom to Rostock.
Mary and Sarah	United Kingdom	The schooner collided with Tartar (United Kingdom) and foundered in the North Sea off Filey, Yorkshire. Her crew were rescued. She was on a voyage from Middlesbrough to Lowestoft, Suffolk.
Minna	United Kingdom	The schooner was driven ashore at Rye, Sussex. Her five crew were rescued.
Nimrod	United Kingdom	The schooner was driven ashore near Rye. She was on a voyage from Caen, Calvados to Colchester, Essex. She was refloated and resumed her voyage, but consequently foundered off the Dungeness Lighthouse, Kent. Her crew survived.
Nova Scotia	United Kingdom	The full-rigged ship ran aground in the Saint Lawrence River 3 nautical miles (5.6 km) downstream of Montreal, Province of Canada, British North America. She was on a voyage from Montreal to Liverpool, Lancashire.
Nymphe	France	The chasse-marée ran aground on the Longsand. She was on a voyage from Blyth, Northumberland, United Kingdom to Saint-Vaast-la-Hougue, Manche. She was refloated with the assistance of the smacks Marco Polo, Qui Vive, Tryall and Unity (all United Kingdom) and taken in to Harwich, Essex.
Olivia	United Kingdom	The schooner ran aground at Brăila, Ottoman Empire. She was on a voyage from Newcastle upon Tyne to Brăila.
Passagier	France	The brig struck the Minquiers and foundered. Her crew survived. She was on a voyage from La Rochelle, Charente-Inférieure to Granville, Manche.
Primrose	United Kingdom	The ship was driven ashore at Aberystwyth, Cardiganshire. She was on a voyage from Saltney, Cheshire to Aberystwyth.
Queen of the West	United Kingdom	The brigantine was driven ashore at "Guardiani", Cephalonia, United States of the Ionian Islands and was abandoned by her eight crew. She was on a voyage from Penzance, Cornwall to Zakynthos, United States of the Ionian Islands. She had become a wreck by 13 November.
Tamora	United Kingdom	The barque was driven ashore in Portland Bay, Australia. Her crew were rescued. She became a wreck on 17 November.
Ville de Lucon	United Kingdom	The ship was driven ashore at Ilfracombe, Devon, United Kingdom. She was on a voyage from Cardiff, Glamorgan to Nantes, Loire-Inférieure. She was refloated with assistance from Iowa (United States) and taken in to Ilfracombe in a leaky condition.
William	United Kingdom	The ship was driven ashore at "Thornloch", Lothian. She was on a voyage from Leith, Lothian to South Shields, County Durham.
William Wallis	United Kingdom	The barque was driven ashore and wrecked at the mouth of the Dniepr. Her twelve crew survived. She was on a voyage from Cardiff to Constantinople, Ottoman Empire.

== 16 November ==
List of shipwrecks: 16 November 1860
Ship	State	Description
Air	United Kingdom	The ship foundered off the Gunfleet Sand, in the North Sea off the coast of Essex.
Angele	France	The schooner was driven ashore east of Gravelines, Nord. Her crew were rescued. She was on a voyage from Newcastle upon Tyne, Northumberland, United Kingdom to Seville, Spain.
Aurora	United Kingdom	The schooner struck a sunken rock off Cape Cautin, Morocco and was beached at Safi, where she was wrecked. She was on a voyage from Mazagan to Safi.
Baix	France	The fishing lugger collided with Falcon (United Kingdom) and sank off the Goodwin Sands, Kent, United Kingdom.
Belleslois	France	The lugger struck the Ilate de Jarvis Rock, off the coast of Vendée and was wrecked with the loss of three of her crew. She was on a voyage from Cardiff, Glamorgan, United Kingdom to Rochefort, Charente-Inférieure.
Colonist	United Kingdom	The ship departed from Constantinople, Ottoman Empire whilst on a voyage from Taganrog, Russia to Falmouth, Cornwall. No further trace, presumed foundered with the loss of all hands.
Denok Bintang	Netherlands East Indies	The ship was wrecked on a reef off Pula Ra-as. She was on a voyage from "Bali Ampanan" to Samarang.
Enterprise	United Kingdom	The whaler, a full-rigged ship was lost in the Davis Strait. Her 50 crew survived.
Eva	(United Kingdom of Great Britain and Ireland) Tasmania	The schooner was driven ashore in Portland Bay. She was refloated on 14 November.
Fulmar	United Kingdom	The ship struck a sunken wreck in the North Sea 5 nautical miles (9.3 km) south of the Dudgeon Sandbank and was abandoned. Her crew were rescued by a schooner. She was on a voyage from Sunderland, County Durham to London. She was boarded by the crew of the barque Emily (United Kingdom) and taken in to Lowestoft, Suffolk in a severely leaky condition.
George and Margaret	United Kingdom	The ship departed from Sunderland for Rouen, Seine-Inférieure, France. No further trace, presumed foundered with the loss of all hands.
Leo	United Kingdom	The snow was wrecked near Kijkduin, South Holland, Netherlands. Her eight crew survived. She was on a voyage from Newcastle upon Tyne to Amsterdam, North Holland, Netherlands.
Minero	Netherlands	The schooner was wrecked off "Bjorregaard", Denmark. Her crew were rescued. She was on a voyage from Dublin, United Kingdom to Königsberg, Prussia.
Regia	(United Kingdom of Great Britain and Ireland) Tasmania	The ship was driven ashore in Portland Bay.
Stranton	United Kingdom	The brig collided with the brig Alexander and foundered in the North Sea off Cromer, Norfolk. Her crew were rescued. She was on a voyage from West Hartlepool, County Durham to London.

== 17 November ==
List of shipwrecks: 17 November 1860
Ship	State	Description
Albert	United Kingdom	The ship ran aground at Fleetwood, Lancashire. She was refloated on 19 November.
Atmosphere	United Kingdom	The ship ran aground at Melancholy Point, in the Hooghly River. She was on a voyage from Liverpool, Lancashire to Calcutta, India.
Charity	United Kingdom	The brigantine was wrecked on the Longsand, in the North Sea off the coast of Essex with the loss of four lives. Survivors were rescued by the smack Tryall (United Kingdom). Charity was on a voyage from Warkworth, Northumberland to Rouen, Seine-Inférieure, France.
Drei Enkel	Grand Duchy of Mecklenburg-Schwerin	The brig was driven ashore and wrecked on Skagen, Denmark. She was on a voyage from Newcastle upon Tyne, Northumberland, United Kingdom to Stettin.
Giuletta	Kingdom of the Two Sicilies	The barque ran aground on the Black Middens, in the North Sea off the coast of County Durham, United Kingdom. She was on a voyage from North Shields, County Durham to Naples. She was refloated and towed in to North Shields.
Hydra	(United Kingdom of Great Britain and Ireland) Jersey	The cutter was run down and sunk by the barque Imogene (Netherlands) off the Kent coast with the loss of her captain. Four survivors were rescued by a Deal boat. She was on a voyage from Newcastle upon Tyne to Saint-Brieuc, Côtes-du-Nord, France.
Mary Bolland	United Kingdom	The schooner was driven ashore and wrecked near Cley-next-the-Sea, Norfolk with the loss of three of her crew. She was on a voyage from Newcastle upon Tyne to Plymouth, Devon.
Nancy	United Kingdom	The brig was driven ashore and damaged at Lowestoft, Suffolk.
Newport	United Kingdom	The schooner was wrecked on the Barn Sands. Her six crew were rescued by the schooner Deux Celines (France).
Rattler	India	The steamship was wrecked on False Point.
Tamora	United Kingdom	The barque was driven ashore at Portland, Victoria. She was on a voyage from London to Portland.
Wanderer	United Kingdom	The ship was driven ashore near Minehead, Somerset. She was on a voyage from Cork to Bridgwater, Somerset. She was refloated and taken in to Minehead in a leaky condition.
Zior	United Kingdom	The brig ran aground on Scroby Sands, Norfolk. She was on a voyage from Sunderland, County Durham to London. She was refloated and resumed her voyage, but put in to Harwich, Essex in a leaky condition.

== 18 November ==
List of shipwrecks: 18 November 1860
Ship	State	Description
Admiral Codrington	United Kingdom	The schooner was discovered derelict in the North Sea off the coast of Lincolnshire by the smack Rifleman (United Kingdom). She was taken in to King's Lynn, Norfolk.
Agnes	United Kingdom	The ship was driven ashore at the mouth of the River Wear. She was on a voyage from Middlesbrough, Yorkshire to Sunderland, County Durham. She was refloated with the assistance of the tug Favourite and towed in to Sunderland.
Ann	United Kingdom	The schooner was abandoned in the North Sea of the coast of Yorkshire.
Bella	United Kingdom	The ship ran aground on Scroby Sands, Norfolk. She was on a voyage from South Shields, County Durham to Plymouth, Devon. Bella was refloated and taken in to Lowestoft, Suffolk, where she collided with Boyne (United Kingdom).
Dahlia	United Kingdom	The ship ran aground and was severely damaged at Margate, Kent. She was on a voyage from London to Ghent, East Flanders, Belgium.
Dutch Trader	United Kingdom	The sloop was driven ashore at Sea Palling, Norfolk. She was on a voyage from Berwick upon Tweed, Northumberland to Weymouth, Dorset. She was refloated on 13 January 1861 and towed in to Great Yarmouth, Norfolk.
Favourite	Sweden	The barque was driven ashore on Texel, North Holland, Netherlands. She was on a voyage from Härnösand to Honfleur, Manche, France. She was refloated on 28 November with assistance from a steamship and was towed in to Rotterdam, South Holland, Netherlands.
George Arkle	United Kingdom	The ship collided with the brig Charlemagne (France) and ran aground on Scroby Sands. She was on a voyage from Newcastle upon Tyne, Northumberland to Bombay, India. George Arkle was refloated, but then collided with the brigs Violet and Waterwitch and the sloop William (all United Kingdom) before she was beached at Gorleston, Suffolk. She was refloated on 20 November and taken in to Great Yarmouth, Norfolk.
Hellmuth	Prussia	The brig was driven ashore at Port Sido, near Venice, Kingdom of Lombardy–Venetia. Her crew were rescued. She was on a voyage from Sunderland, County Durham to Venice. She had become a wreck by 22 November.
John M. Wood	United States	The full-rigged ship caught fire at New Orleans, Louisiana.
Nancy	United Kingdom	The brig ran aground at Lowestoft, Suffolk and was damaged. She was later refloated.
Phœbe	United Kingdom	The steamship was driven ashore at Rhyl, Denbighshire. Her crew survived. She was on a voyage from Whitehaven, Cumberland to Chester, Cheshire.
Prudence	France	The schooner was driven ashore at Boulogne-sur-Mer, Pas-de-Calais. She was on a voyage from La Rochelle, Charente-Inférieure to Dunkirk, Nord.

== 19 November ==
List of shipwrecks: 19 November 1860
Ship	State	Description
Admiral Hood	United Kingdom	The schooner was driven ashore and wrecked at Great Yarmouth, Norfolk. Her six crew were rescued by the Yarmouth Lifeboat. She was on a voyage from Hartlepool, County Durham to Milton Regis, Kent.
Amethyst	United Kingdom	The ship was driven ashore at Rangoon, British Burma. She was on a voyage from Point de Galle, Ceylon to Rangoon.
Caroline	United Kingdom	The barque ran aground on the Newcombe Sand, in the North Sea off the coast of Suffolk and was abandoned by her crew. She was on a voyage from South Shields, County Durham to Alexandria, Egypt. She was refloated and taken in to Lowestoft, Suffolk.
Caroline	United Kingdom	The ship ran aground at Rangoon. She was on a voyage from Liverpool, Lancashire to Rangoon.
Charlotte	Hamburg	The ship collided with Frithiof (Norway) and sank in the English Channel off Folkestone, Kent, United Kingdom. Her crew were rescued by Frithiof. Charlotte was on a voyage from Newcastle upon Tyne, Northumberland to Messina, Sicily.
Edward Hawkins	United Kingdom	The steamship ran aground on "Lavenscar", Russia. Her crew were rescued. She was on a voyage from Kronstadt, Russia to Hull, Yorkshire. Edward Hawkins was refloated in May 1861 and taken in to Kronstadt, where she arrived on 23 May.
Flower	United Kingdom	The ship was driven ashore near Hellevoetsluis, Zeeland, Netherlands.
Guildford	United Kingdom	The brig was abandoned in the North Sea. Her eight crew were rescued. She was on a voyage from Gothenburg, Sweden to Grimsby, Lincolnshire.
Jackson	United Kingdom	The brig sprang a leak and foundered in the English Channel 14 nautical miles (26 km) off the South Foreland, Kent and 7 nautical miles (13 km) off Calais, France. Her crew survived. She was on a voyage from South Shields to London.
Lalla Rookh	(United Kingdom of Great Britain and Ireland) New Zealand	The brig was driven ashore and damaged at Port Albert, Victoria. She was on a voyage from Wellington to Melbourne, Victoria. She was refloated.
Martin	United Kingdom	The ship was run into by the schooner Reine ( (United Kingdom of Great Britain and Ireland) Jersey) and sank in the North Sea off Aldeburgh, Suffolk. Her crew were rescued.
Prince Arthur	(United Kingdom of Great Britain and Ireland) New South Wales	The ship struck the Corsair Rock, off the coast of Victoria and was consequently beached at "Williamson, Victoria". She was on a voyage from Newcastle to Melbourne.
Zeemeeuw	Netherlands	The ship foundered in the North Sea (54°10′N 3°38′E) with the loss of a crew member. Survivors were rescued by the brig Bikuben (Norway). Zeemeeuw was on a voyage from Middlesbrough, Yorkshire to Dordrecht, South Holland.

== 20 November ==
List of shipwrecks: 20 November 1860
Ship	State	Description
Foletta	Kingdom of Hanover	The ship ran aground on the Geysand, in the North Sea and was wrecked. Her crew were rescued. She was on a voyage from Newcastle upon Tyne, Northumberland, United Kingdom to Norden.
Frederika	Denmark	The three-masted schooner was driven ashore south of Dragør. She was on a voyage from Newcastle upon Tyne to Aarhus. She was refloated and resumed her voyage.
Georgiana	United States	The full-rigged ship was destroyed by fire in the Atlantic Ocean. Her crew were rescued by Levi Woodbury (United States). Georgiana was on a voyage from New Orleans, Louisiana to Liverpool, Lancashire, United Kingdom.
Gezina	Netherlands	The schooner was driven ashore on Texel, North Holland. Her crew were rescued by a lifeboat. She was on a voyage from Newcastle upon Tyne to London, United Kingdom.
Gregoretto	Flag unknown	The ship ran aground on the Longsand, in the North Sea off the coast of Essex, United Kingdom. She was on a voyage from Constantinople, Ottoman Empire to Ipswich, Suffolk, United Kingdom. She was refloated with the assistancce of six smacks and taken in to Harwich, Essex, United Kingdom in a severely leaky condition.
Intrepid	United Kingdom	The barque foundered in the North Sea off Flamborough Head, Yorkshire. Her crew were rescued by Classina Arendina (Netherlands). Intrepid was on a voyage from South Shields, County Durham to Genoa, Kingdom of Sardinia.
Jane Havard	United Kingdom	The ship collided with Clio (United Kingdom) and was then driven ashore at Shoreham-by-Sea, Sussex. She was severely damaged.
Kilblain	United Kingdom	The barque was abandoned in the Atlantic Ocean. Her fifteen crew were rescued by Diana (United Kingdom). Kilblain was on a voyage from Quebec City, Province of Canada, British North America to Sunderland, County Durham.
Marle	Greifswald	The schooner sprang a leak and was run ashore near Hirtshals, Denmark, where she became a wreck. She was on a voyage from Dublin. United Kingdom to Königsberg, Kingdom of Prussia.
Pet	United Kingdom	The barque was driven ashore at Whitburn, County Durham. Her crew were rescued. She was on a voyage from London to South Shields.
Prospector	United Kingdom	The schooner foundered off Bellambi, New South Wales.
Sarah	United Kingdom	The ship was wrecked on the Ooster Bank, in the North Sea off the Dutch coast. Her crew were rescued by a pilot boat. She was on a voyage from Newcastle upon Tyne to Schiedam, South Holland, Netherlands.

== 21 November ==
List of shipwrecks: 21 November 1860
Ship	State	Description
Antagonist	(United Kingdom of Great Britain and Ireland) Jersey	The ship was in collision with another vessel and sank in the English Channel off the Kent coast. Her crew were rescued. She was on a voyage from Jersey to Arbroath, Forfarshire.
Armand	France	The brig was driven ashore at Ramsgate, Kent. She was on a voyage from Sunderland, County Durham, United Kingdom to Nantes, Loire-Inférieure. She broke up on 26 November.
Aukjen	Hamburg	The galiot was abandoned in the North Sea. Her crew were rescued by Øresund (Norway). Aukjen was on a voyage from Aberdour, Fife, United Kingdom to Altona.
Boreas	United Kingdom	The galiot was wrecked on the Haaks Sandbank, in the North Sea off the coast of Zeeland, Netherlands. She was on a voyage from Leith, Lothian to Harlingen, Friesland, Netherlands.
Cheerful	United Kingdom	The ship was driven ashore and wrecked in Ardmore Bay. Her crew were rescued.
Erndt	Hamburg	The ship ran aground on the Shipwash Sand, in the North Sea off the coast of Essex, United Kingdom. She was on a voyage from Horsens, Denmark to London, United Kingdom. She was refloated and assisted in to Harwich, Essex.
Friend	United Kingdom	The smack foundered in the North Sea. Her crew were rescued by a fishing boat.
James H. Elmorf	United States	The ship collided with RMS Persia (United Kingdom) and sank at New York. Her crew were rescued.
La Patrie	France	The brig foundered 4 nautical miles (7.4 km) off the Wolf Rock, Cornwall, United Kingdom. Her eight crew were rescued. She was on a voyage from Saint-Malo, Ille-et-Vilaine to Cardiff, Glamorgan, United Kingdom.
Proserpine	United Kingdom	The schooner was abandoned in the Mediterranean Sea 15 nautical miles (28 km) off Malta. Her six crew survived. She was on a voyage from Agrigento, Sicily to Liverpool, Lancashire.
Rensche	Kingdom of Hanover	The koff was driven ashore "near the Kboug" with the loss of two of her four crew. She was on a voyage from Leith, Lothian, United Kingdom to Varel.
Sauveur	France	The ship collided with Flora McDonald (United States) in the Thames Estuary. Some of her crew were rescued by Flora McDonald, fate of vessel and remainder of crew unknown.
Sir William Chaytor	United Kingdom	The brig ran aground on the Kentish Knock. She was on a voyage from South Shields, County Durham to London. She was refloated with the assistance of five smacks and taken in to Harwich, Essex.
Vengeur	France	The ship was driven ashore at Ramsgate. She was on a voyage from Hartlepool, County Durham to the Charente.

== 22 November ==
List of shipwrecks: 22 November 1860
Ship	State	Description
Britannia	United Kingdom	The brig was wrecked at Aberdeen. Six of her seven crew were rescued by the Aberdeen lifeboat, the other survivor was rescued by a rope thrown from the shore. She was on a voyage from Newcastle upon Tyne, Northumberland to Aberdeen.
Buchan	United Kingdom	The ship was wrecked at New Slains Castle, Aberdeenshire with the loss of five of her eight crew. She was on a voyage from London to Aberdeen.
Byzantium	United Kingdom	The barque was driven ashore and damaged near Stonehaven, Aberdeenshire. She was on a voyage from Leith, Lothian to Newcastle upon Tyne, Northumberland. She was refloated on 28 November and take in to Stonehaven for temporary repairs.
Christopher	United Kingdom	The brig sank at Dungeness, Kent. She was on a voyage from South Shields, County Durham to Bermuda.
Cresswell	Norway	The barque ran aground on the Ridge Sand, in the English Channel and was wrecked. Her fifteen crew took to two boats. Three crew were rescued by Active (United Kingdom), the others remained alongside the wreck. Cresswell was on a voyage from South Shields, to Bermuda.
Ellen	United Kingdom	The schooner was wrecked near Stonehaven
Elida	Prussia	The ship departed from Memel for "Morrisonhaven". No further trace, presumed foundered with the loss of all hands.
Happy Return	United Kingdom	The schooner was driven ashore at Lindisfarne, Northumberland. She was on a voyage from Sunderland, County Durham to Arbroath, Forfarshire.
Henrietta	United Kingdom	The ship was wrecked north of Johnshaven, Aberdeenshire. Her six crew survived.
Manzathien	United Kingdom	The barque was wrecked near Stonehaven. Her crew were rescued by the Stonehaven Lifeboat. She was on a voyage from Leith, Lothian to South Shields.
Sarah	United Kingdom	The snow was wrecked on the Ooster Bank, in the North Sea off the Dutch coast. Her eight crew survived. She was on a voyage from Newcastle upon Tyne, Northumberland to Schiedam, South Holland, Netherlands.
Simla	United Kingdom	The full-rigged ship was driven ashore between Dover and Folkestone, Kent. She was on a voyage from London to Calcutta, India. She was refloated the next day and put back to Gravesend, Kent.
Triton	Grand Duchy of Oldenburg	The ship was driven ashore on Hogland, Russia. Her crew were rescued. She was on a voyage from Saint Petersburg, Russia to Montrose, Forfarshire, United Kingdom.
Twee Jeannes	Netherlands	The ship ran aground on Poels Liat, in the Gaspar Strait. She subsequently caught fire and was destroyed. Her crew were rescued. Twee Jeannes was on a voyage from Hong Kong to Batavia, Netherlands East Indies.
Union	(United Kingdom of Great Britain and Ireland) Isle of Man	The smack was wrecked on the San Medina Rocks, off the south coast of Spain, with the loss of three of her five crew. Survivors were rescued by the steamship Darro (Spain). Union was on a voyage from Cork to Seville, Spain.

== 23 November ==
List of shipwrecks: 23 November 1860
Ship	State	Description
Active	United Kingdom	The brig was driven ashore at Boulmer, Northumberland. Her crew were rescued.
Anna	United Kingdom	The ship ran aground on the Herd Sand, in the North Sea off the coast of County Durham. She was on a voyage from Cartagena, Spain to North Shields, County Durham.
Arno	United Kingdom	The barque was driven ashore and wrecked in Frenchman's Bay, County Durham. Her fourteen crew were rescued by rocket apparatus. She was on a voyage from Cartagena, Spain to Newcastle upon Tyne, Northumberland.
Charles and Ann	United Kingdom	The schooner ran aground at Teignmouth, Devon and was severely damaged. She was on a voyage from Kirkcaldy, Fife to Teignmouth.
Colombo	Kingdom of the Two Sicilies	The ship ran aground at North Shields. She was on a voyage from Agrigento to North Shields.
Commodore	Kingdom of Hanover	The brig ran aground on the Cork Sand, in the North Sea off the coast of Essex, United Kingdom. She was on a voyage from Hamburg to Buenos Aires, Argentina. She was refloated the next day with the assistance of two smacks and taken in to Harwich, Essex.
Contrest	United Kingdom	The ship departed from New York, United States for Queenstown, County Cork. No further trace, presumed foundered with the loss of all hands.
Corsyra	United Kingdom	The ship was wrecked.
Earl of Lonsdale	United Kingdom	The barque foundered in the Atlantic Ocean. Her fourteen crew survived. She was on a voyage from Demerara, British Guiana to the Clyde.
Elizabeth Louise	France	The ship ran aground at North Shields. She was on a voyage from Bordeaux, Gironde to North Shields.
Eliza Pirrie	United Kingdom	The barque was abandoned in the North Sea with the loss of two of her eighteen crew. She was on a voyage from Hull, Yorkshire to Gothenburg, Sweden.
Hansa	Hamburg	The brig was wrecked on the Longsand, in the North Sea off the coast of Essex. Her crew were rescued. She was on a voyage from Hamburg to Rio de Janeiro, Brazil.
Isaac and Isabella	United Kingdom	The schooner was abandoned off Coquet Island, Northumberland. Her five crew were rescued by the Hauxley Lifeboat.
Julius	United Kingdom	The galiot struck rocks off Cresswell, Northumberland and sank. Her crew were rescued. She was on a voyage from London to the River Tyne.
Juno	United Kingdom	The ship was driven ashore at Lampsacus, Ottoman Empire.
Laurence	United Kingdom	The ship ran aground on the Whitby Sand. She was on a voyage from Ipswich, Suffolk to Whitby, Yorkshire. All on board were rescued by the Coast Guard. She was on a voyage from Ipswich, Suffolk to Whitby. She was refloated and taken in to Whitby.
Mars	Austrian Empire	The steamship collided with the steamship Smyrna (United Kingdom) and sank in the Danube 12 nautical miles (22 km) upstream of Sulina, Ottoman Empire.
Ocean Wave	United Kingdom	The barque was wrecked at Tamatave, Madagascar. Her crew were rescued. She was on a voyage from Tamatave to Mauritius.
Queen of the South	United States	The ship was driven ashore in the Dardanelles. She was refloated.
Rose	United Kingdom	The schooner was wrecked at Line Burn North, Northumberland. Her five crew were rescued by the Newbiggin Lifeboat.
Sandvegen	Norway	The ship foundered in the North Sea. Her crew were rescued by Øresund (Norway). She was on a voyage from Newcastle upon Tyne to Halden.
Seagull	United Kingdom	The ship was driven ashore south of Helsingborg, Sweden. She was on a voyage from Kronstadt, Russia to Leith, Lothian. She was refloated with the assistance of a steamship and resumed her voyage.
St. Mare	France	The barque ran aground off Tamatave. She was refloated and taken in to Tamatave for repairs.
Susan and Isabella	United Kingdom	The schooner was wrecked on the coast of Northumberland. Her five crew were rescued by the Hauxley Lifeboat. She was on a voyage from Dundee Forfarshire to Newcastle upon Tyne, Northumberland. Susan and Isabella was towed in to Warkworth, Northumberland by the steamship Ellen Brown (United Kingdom).
Themis and Willem	Netherlands	The galiot was driven ashore and wrecked at Horsey, Norfolk, United Kingdom. She was on a voyage from Leith to Barcelona, Spain.
Union	United Kingdom	The cutter was wrecked on the Salmedinas Rocks, off the coast of Spain with the loss of three of her five crew. Survivors were rescued by the steamship Darro (Spain). Union was on a voyage from Cork to Seville, Spain.
Union	United Kingdom	The tug ran aground on the Herd Sand and was wrecked. Her crew were rescued by the North Shields Lifeboat. She was on a voyage from Ipswich, Suffolk to Sunderland, County Durham.

== 24 November ==
List of shipwrecks: 24 November 1860
Ship	State	Description
Dacotah	United States	The steamer was wrecked in 18 Mile Creek or on Sturgeon Point in Lake Erie in a gale with the loss of all 24 on board.
Iron Gray	United Kingdom	The ship departed from Matanzas, Cuba for Falmouth, Cornwall. No further trace, presumed foundered with the loss of all hands.
La Plata	United Kingdom	The steamship was severely damaged by fire at Southampton, Hampshire.
Matchless	United States	The schooner foundered off Cape São Roque, Brazil. Her crew were rescued. She was on a voyage from the Rio Grande to New York.
Nottingham	United Kingdom	The barque was destroyed by fire at sea. Her seventeen crew survived. She was on a voyage from Liverpool, Lancashire to Calcutta, India.
Ruby	United Kingdom	The paddle steamer was wrecked at Ballyhalbert, County Down. She was on a voyage from the Clyde to Calcutta, India.
Scotland	United Kingdom	The barge sank at Montreal, Province of Canada, British North America.
Unite	United Kingdom	The schooner sprang a leak and sank off Skomer, Pembrokeshire. Her crew were rescued. She was on a voyage from Llanelly, Glamorgan to Newry, County Antrim.

== 25 November ==
List of shipwrecks: 25 November 1860
Ship	State	Description
Golconda	United Kingdom	The barque was driven ashore on Acklins Island, Bahamas. She was consequently condemned.
Kron Prins Ernst August	Kingdom of Hanover	The full-rigged ship ran aground off the Black Rock, off the coast of Cornwall, United Kingdom.
Mary Jane	United Kingdom	The schooner collided with the barque Bouverie (Malta) and was beached at Gibraltar.
Maxwell	United Kingdom	The brig foundered in the Atlantic Ocean off Lisbon, Portugal. Her twelve crew were rescued by Elizabeth (United Kingdom). Maxwell was on a voyage from Taganrog, Russia to a British port.
Phoenix	United Kingdom	The collier, a brig, ran aground on the Brake Sand. She was refloated with the assistance of the tug Aid and lifeboat Northumberland (both United Kingdom) and towed in to Ramsgate, Kent.
Walton	United Kingdom	The ship driven ashore 3 nautical miles (5.6 km) east of the mouth of the Coatzacoalcos River. Her crew were rescued.
Whim	United Kingdom	The smack was driven ashore at Great Yarmouth, Norfolk. She was refloated and taken in to Great Yarmouth.

== 26 November ==
List of shipwrecks: 26 November 1860
Ship	State	Description
Consul Perry	Prussia	The brig was driven ashore near Scarborough, Yorkshire, United Kingdom. Her crew were rescued by the Scarborough Lifeboat. She was on a voyage from Stettin to Hartlepool, County Durham, United Kingdom. She was refloated on 14 December and taken in to Scarborough.
Empire	United Kingdom	The steamship sank during a severe gale in the North Channel in the Isles of Scilly after hitting the Peaked Rocks. Her eighteen crew were rescued by several pilot cutters. She was on a voyage from the Clyde to Bordeaux, Gironde, France.
Erica	Flag unknown	The brig was wrecked on the Platters, off the coast of Anglesey, United Kingdom. Her crew were rescued. She was on a voyage from Taganrog, Russia to Londonderry, United Kingdom.
Guatemala	Norway	The brig was driven ashore and wrecked north of Rose Mullion Head, cornwall, United Kingdom. Her crew were rescued. She was on a voyage from Porsgrund to Helford, Cornwall.
Lydia	United Kingdom	The full-rigged ship was wrecked on the Blackwater Bank, in the Irish Sea off the coast of County Wexford with the loss of three of her nineteen crew. She was on a voyage from Liverpool, Lancashire to Montevideo, Uruguay. She floated off and came ashore 13 nautical miles (24 km) north of Wexford.
Masconome	United States	The ship departed from New York for London, United Kingdom. No further trace, presumed foundered with the loss of all hands.
Nueva Leucos	Austrian Empire	The barque ran aground at West Hartlepool, County Durham, United Kingdom. She was refloated.

== 27 November ==
List of shipwrecks: 27 November 1860
Ship	State	Description
Alice	United Kingdom	The steamship sprang a leak and was beached at Lisbon, Portugal. She was on a voyage from Palermo, Sicily to London.
Bouverie	Malta	The barque collided with another vessel at San Roque, Spain and was beached.
Champion	United Kingdom	The ship was wrecked in the Richmond River. She was on a voyage from the Richmond River to Sydney, New South Wales.
Contest	United Kingdom	The ship ran aground on the Caistor Shoal, in the North Sea off the coast of Norfolk. She was on a voyage from Great Yarmouth, Norfolk to Hartlepool, County Durham. She was refloated and resumed her voyage, but consequently put in to Grimsby, Lincolnshire in a leaky condition.
Gazelle	Belgium	The ship departed from a port in Haiti for Antwerp. No further trace, presumed foundered with the loss of all hands.
Malvern	United Kingdom	The brigantine foundered. Her five crew were rescued by Frederick Wilhelm (Norway). Malvern was on a voyage from Cardiff, Glamorgan to Cork.
Rapid	United Kingdom	The brig foundered. Her eight crew were rescued by Frederick Wilhelm (Norway). Rapid was on a voyage from the Clyde to Dieppe, Seine-Inférieure, France.
Savanna	United Kingdom	The brig was wrecked in the Danube at Sfântu Gheorghe, Ottoman Empire.

== 28 November ==
List of shipwrecks: 28 November 1860
Ship	State	Description
Bradford	United Kingdom	The brig ran aground on the Goodwin Sands, Kent. Her crew were rescued by the lifeboat Northumberland (United Kingdom).
Consul	United Kingdom	The ship was driven ashore at Scarborough, Yorkshire and sank. She was on a voyage from Stettin to Hartlepool, County Durham.
Jeune Rose	France	The schooner was towed in to the Isles of Scilly, United Kingdom in a derelict condition.
Pearl	United Kingdom	The ship was driven ashore east of the mouth of the River Spey. She was refloated and taken in to Dundee, Forfarshire.
Verbena	United Kingdom	The snow was abandoned north east of the Isles of Scilly. Her eight crew were rescued by the full-rigged ship Robin Hood (United States). Verbena was on a voyage from Cardiff, Glamorgan to Barcelona, Spain.
Victoria	United Kingdom	The ship was driven ashore at Caen, Calvados, France. She was on a voyage from Newcastle upon Tyne, Northumberland to Caen. She was refloated and taken in to Caen in a leaky condition.
Walton	United Kingdom	The barque was driven ashore at "Cortycollas". Her eleven crew survived. She was on a voyage from London to Bathurst, Gambia Colony and Protectorate.

== 29 November ==
List of shipwrecks: 29 November 1860
Ship	State	Description
Herculean	United Kingdom	The full-rigged ship was wrecked at Paul's Head, in the Gaspar Strait. Her crew were rescued. She was on a voyage from Whampoa, China to London.
Ocean	United Kingdom	The ship ran aground at Youghal, County Cork. She was on a voyage from Cardiff, Glamorgan to Penzance, Cornwall. She was refloated and taken in to Youghal.
Souvenir	(United Kingdom of Great Britain and Ireland) New South Wales	The schooner was wrecked on the South Reef. She was on a voyage from Sydney to Bellambi.
Varuna	United Kingdom	The ship ran aground at Kertch, Russia. She was refloated on 1 December.

== 30 November ==
List of shipwrecks: 30 November 1860
Ship	State	Description
George	United Kingdom	The ship ran aground and was beached at Kirkcaldy, Fife. She was on a voyage from South Shields, County Durham to Kirkcaldy.
Melpomene	United Kingdom	The barque ran aground in Fairlie Sound. She was on a voyage from Glasgow, Renfrewshire to Genoa, Kingdom of Sardinia. She was refloated and put back to Glasgow.
Ostsee	Stettin	The brig was driven ashore at Falsterbo, Sweden. She was on a voyage from Stettin to Aberdeen, United Kingdom. She was refloated and taken in to Helsingør, Denmark in a sinking condition.
Phœbe	United Kingdom	The ship ran aground on the Sunk Sand, in the North Sea off the coast of Essex. She was on a voyage from the River Tyne to Havre de Grâce, Seine-Inférieure, France. She was refloated and taken in to Harwich, Essex.
Rover	United Kingdom	The schooner was wrecked in Alexander Bay.

== Unknown date ==
List of shipwrecks: Unknown date in November 1860
Ship	State	Description
Akerman	Norway	The ship was lost at Odesa.
Alarm	Norway	The ship was abandoned in the North Sea before 20 November.
Alfred and Victor	United Kingdom	The ship was wrecked before 8 November. There were at least three survivors.
Argus	United States	The schooner was abandoned in the Atlantic Ocean before 19 November.
Black Prince	United Kingdom	The steamship collided with the steamship Araxes (Spain) and foundered off Gibraltar. Her crew were rescued.
Carl Johann	Sweden	The ship foundered in the Bay of Biscay. She was on a voyage from Gothenburg to Gibraltar.
Casiga	United Kingdom	The ship was wrecked at "Christiansol". She was towed in to Rønne, Denmark on 2 November by the steamship Melkin (Denmark).
Celestine	United Kingdom	The ship was driven ashore at Troy, Ottoman Empire.
Charlotte	United Kingdom	The sloop capsized at the junction of the River Ouse and River Trent with the loss of seven lives. She was on a voyage from Leeds, Yorkshire to Lincoln, Lincolnshire.
Charmer	United States	The clipper ran aground on a reef off Bangka Island, Netherlands East Indies after 14 November. She was on a voyage from Whampoa Bay to New York. She was refloated and resumed her voyage.
Declien	United Kingdom	The ship was lost whilst on a voyage from Swansea Glamorgan to Alexandria, Egypt. Her crew were rescued.
Elise	France	The schooner capsized and was driven ashore between "Savan" and Paimbœuf, Loire-Inférieure. She was on a voyage from Nantes, Loire-Inférieure to London, United Kingdom.
Emmeline	United Kingdom	The steamship ran aground 9 nautical miles (17 km) off Saaremaa, Russia before 20 November and was abandoned by her crew. She was on a voyage from Hull, Yorkshire to Riga, Russia. Emmeline broke in two on 30 November. She was a total loss.
Fiducia	United Kingdom	The ship was driven ashore and wrecked.
Friend	United Kingdom	The ship sank in the North Sea before 21 November. Her crew were rescued.
Gamma	United Kingdom	The ship collided with Kirkconnel (United Kingdom) and sank in the River Thames at Greenwich, Kent. She was on a voyage from Newcastle upon Tyne, Northumberland to London.
Hanse	Hamburg	The brig ran aground on the Longsand, in the North Sea off the coast of Essex, United Kingdom. She was refloated but had to be beached and was a total loss.
Hermitage	United Kingdom	The ship sank.
Intrepid	United Kingdom	The barque foundered in the North Sea. Her crew were rescued by a Dutch galiot. She was on a voyage from South Shields, County Durham to Genoa, Kingdom of Sardinia.
Laurvig	Norway	The ship was driven ashore in the Baltic Sea before 9 November. She was refloated and taken in to Stockholm, Sweden for repairs.
Martha Whitmore	United States	The ship was driven ashore at St. John's Point. She was on a voyage from New York to the Clyde. She was refloated on 17 November and taken in to Belfast, County Antrim, United Kingdom.
Michele	Malta	The barque was abandoned in the Irish Sea before 15 November.
Middelpad	Sweden	The ship was abandoned in the North Sea. Her crew were rescued by Alligonda Rescsina (Netherlands). Middelpad was on a voyage from Hartlepool, County Durham, United Kingdom to Malmö. She was subsequently taken in to Texel, North Holland Netherlands.
Mirzah	United Kingdom	The ship ran aground on the Haisborough Sands, in the North Sea off the coast of Norfolk. She was on a voyage from South Shields, County Durham to Corfu, United States of the Ionian Islands. She was refloated and taken in to Great Yarmouth, Norfolk for repairs.
Plover	United Kingdom	The ship was driven ashore on the Dutch coast. She was on a voyage from Liverpool to Dordrecht, South Holland, Netherlands. She was refloated and resumed her voyage.
Prince of Wales	United Kingdom	The ship was wrecked at Miramichi, New Brunswick, British North America between 15 and 26 November. She was on a voyage from Miramichi to Liverpool.
Sin	Austrian Empire	The brig was wrecked in the Danube between Tulcea and Sulina, Ottoman Empire.
South Georgia	United Kingdom	The ship was wrecked on the coast of Chile.
Suormi	Bremen	The ship was wrecked on the Zeehond's Plaat, in the North Sea off the Dutch coast.
