= HMS Investigator Anchors =

HMS Investigator Best Bower Anchor
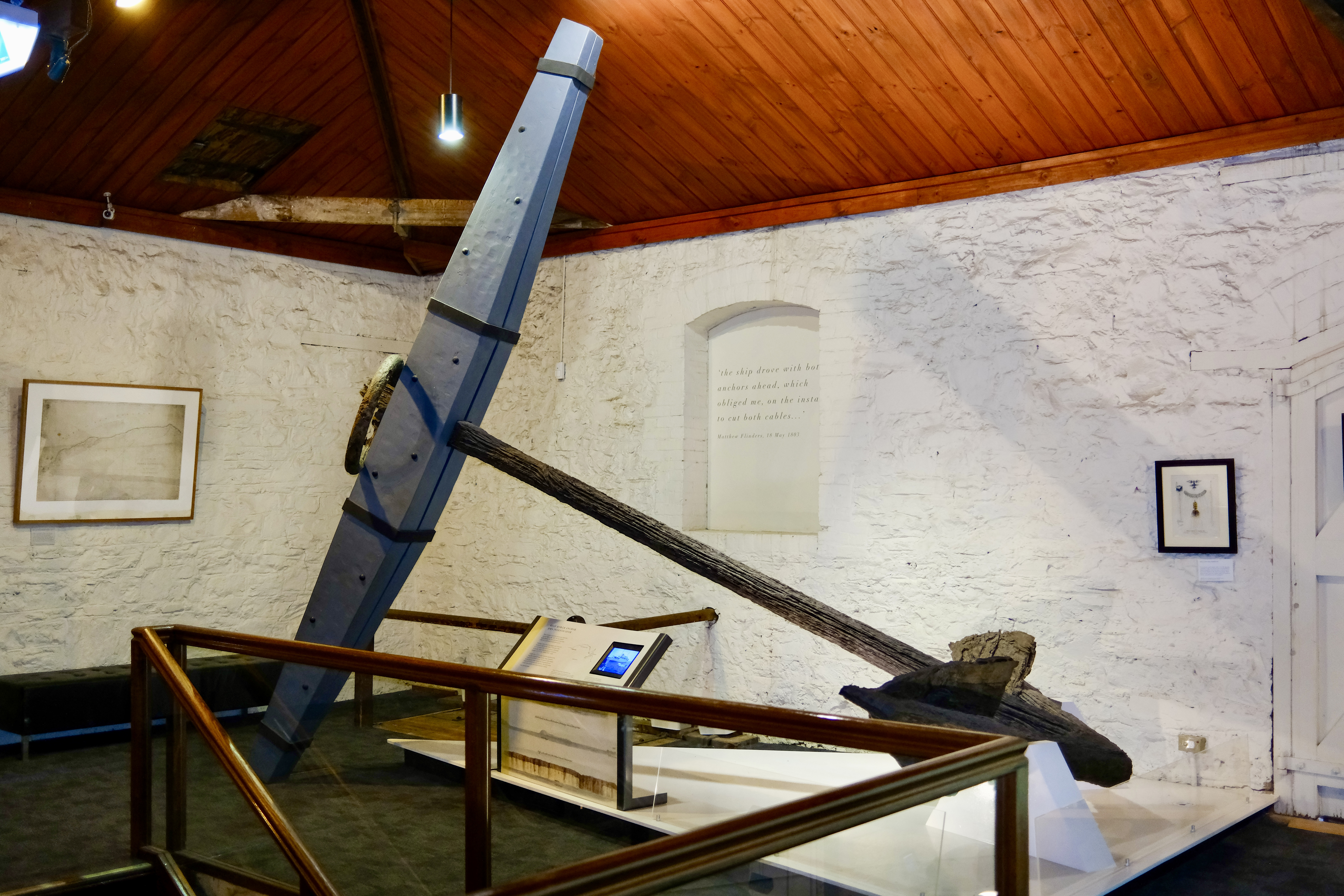
- The Best Bower Anchor, dropped from HMS Investigator, on display at the South Australian Maritime Museum in Port Adelaide.
- Material: Wrought Iron.
- Size: Length: 4,230 millimetres (167 in), mass: 1,230 kilograms (2,710 lb)
- Created: 1795 (Henry Rudd, Monkwearmouthshore, Co.)
- Discovered: 1973, Middle Island, Recherche Archipelago, Western Australia
- Present location: South Australian Maritime Museum
- Identification: HT2003653

HMS Investigator Stream Anchor
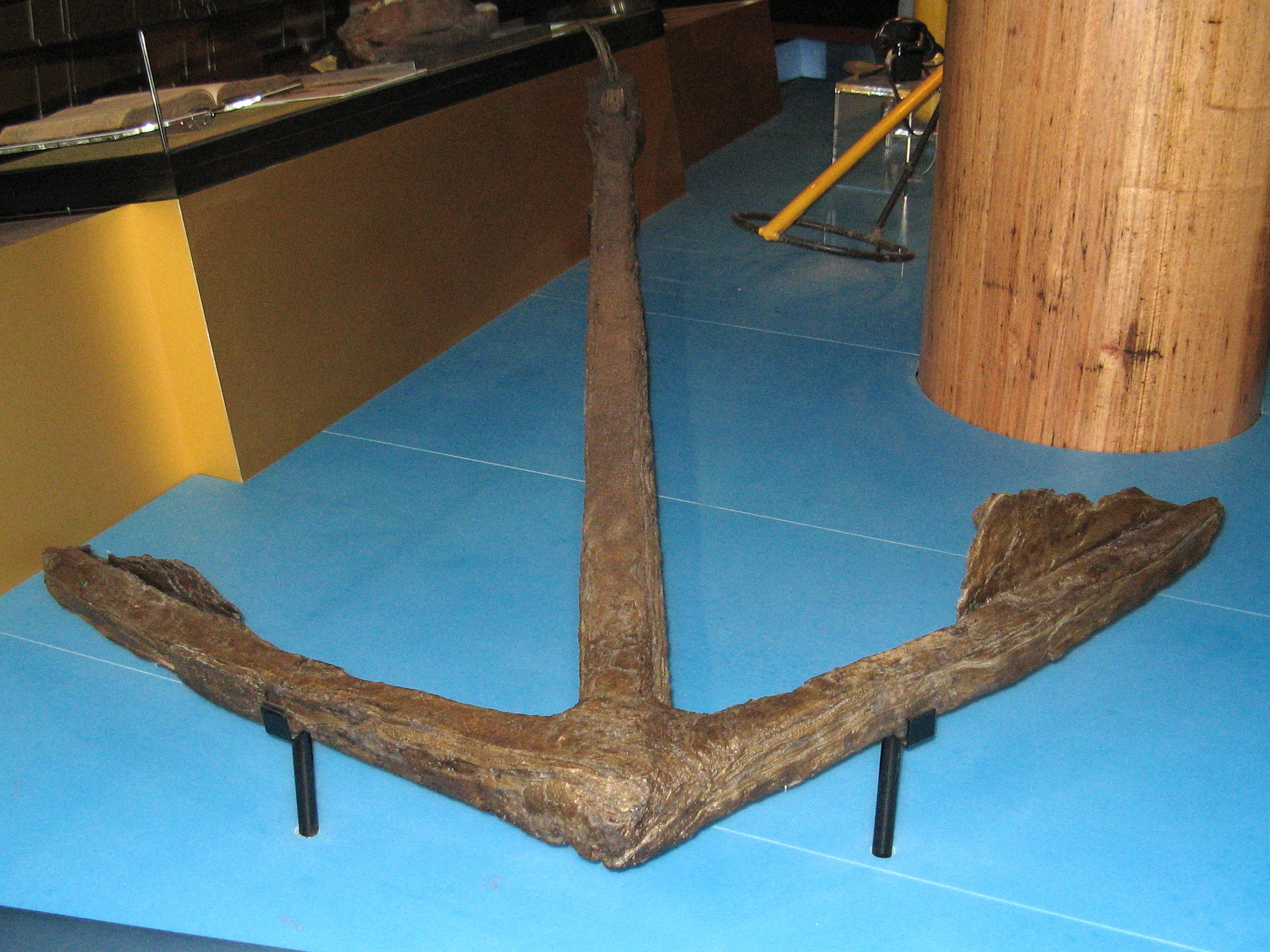
- Material: Wrought iron
- Size: Width: 1,570 millimetres (62 in), Height: 2,500 millimetres (98 in), Depth: 300 millimetres (12 in), Mass: 400 kilograms (880 lb)
- Discovered: 1973, Middle Island, Recherche Archipelago, Western Australia
- Present location: National Museum of Australia
- Identification: 1981.0024.0001

The HMS Investigator Anchors are the two anchors that jettisoned from HMS Investigator on the morning of Saturday, 21 May 1803, by her commander, Matthew Flinders, in order to avoid running aground on Middle Island in the Archipelago of the Recherche on the south coast of New Holland (now Western Australia). In 1973, the anchors were located and recovered by members of the Underwater Explorers Club of South Australia (UEC). The recovered anchors became the subject of an ownership dispute between various governments, particularly those of South Australia and Western Australia due to their historic significance as artefacts of a major voyage of European exploration. The dispute was resolved with the ownership of the anchors going to the Australian Government who subsequently gifted one of the anchors to the South Australian Government. The pair of artefacts is also known as Flinders' Anchors.

== Background ==
The outfitting of Investigator in early 1801 prior to her departure from the United Kingdom for Terra Australis included five bower, two stream and two kedge anchors. An additional bower anchor was included in stores sent to Port Jackson.

Investigator departed Kupang in Timor on 8 April 1803 to sail to Port Jackson, where she arrived on 9 June 1803. The object of the voyage was to seek medical aid for the members of the crew who were suffering from dysentery and fever, and seek repairs to the sloop. Flinders' intention was "to stop a day or two" at the Archipelago of the Recherche for "the purposes of procuring geese for our sick people, seal oil for our lamps, and a few casks of salt from the lake on Middle Island." Investigator arrived on the evening of 17 May 1803 and anchored on the north side of Middle Island, between the island's north east point and Goose Island, in the area known as Goose Island Bay. The visit to Middle Island also allowed the burial of the sloop's boatswain, Charles Douglas, who had died on 18 May 1803, to take place on dry land.

== Loss ==
On departure during the morning of Saturday, 21 May 1803, Flinders discovered that Investigator was in danger of being driven aground on Middle Island by a freshening breeze, before the sails could be loosed. That danger was mitigated by using the sloop's spare anchors to hold it in place. However, Flinders needed to abandon the best bower anchor, a stream anchor, and a quantity of cable, in order to safely depart from the bay. Instead of recovering the two anchors, Investigator continued towards Port Jackson, with the intention of retrieving them at a later time.

== The discovery and recovery ==
Doug Seton, an information officer at the South Australian Museum, found out about the loss of the anchors in 1969 during a conversation with Robert Sexton, a friend and a well-known South Australian maritime historian. Seton then commenced a four-year desktop study to identify the likely area in which the anchors could be found.

In 1972, Seton, a scuba diving enthusiast, planned an expedition to find and recover the anchors with the assistance of fellow members of the UEC: Terry & Helen Drew, Peter & Rosalie Koch and John Summers, and residents of Esperance: Don Gulvan, Don McKenzie and Tony Moore of Cape Arid Farm. He was supported by sponsors BP, a boating business known as Lawton Agencies, and the Adelaide newspaper, the Sunday Mail.

The expedition departed Adelaide for Esperance on 26 December 1972. Later that day, the expedition was paused due to a vehicle accident north of Port Wakefield which resulted in Terry and Helen Drew being hospitalised, their vehicle being destroyed, their boat being damaged, and the death of two occupants of the other vehicle. Terry and Helen Drew later re-joined the expedition to witness the recovery of both anchors.

The expedition resumed and arrived at Middle Island on 4 January 1973. After a week of rough weather, the search commenced on 11 January using a manta board constructed from driftwood and other materials. On 14 January, the best bower anchor was discovered by Peter Koch in 15 metres (49 ft) deep water. After reviewing his desktop research, Seton re-organised the search and, several hours later, found the stream anchor about 9 metres (30 ft) away from the best bower anchor. The news of the discovery was announced on 15 January.

As pre-arranged with the then Commonwealth Department of Shipping and Transport, the lighthouse supply tender, MV Cape Don, arrived on 19 January to lift both anchors off the seabed and convey them to Fremantle for conservation.

== Dispute over ownership ==
As soon as the news of the discovery of the two anchors was announced, a dispute erupted over who was the owner of the artefacts. The protagonists were the governments of Australia, South Australia and Western Australia. The Australian Government argued that it was in the national interest for it to own the anchors. South Australia argued that the anchors were significant as part of the sloop that charted most of its coastline, while Western Australia argued that the anchors were found in its waters. The dispute was resolved when the Australian government took ownership of both anchors in April 1973, with the best bower anchor being subsequently gifted to South Australia.

== Display ==
In 1974, after completion of the conservation process at the Western Australian Museum, the anchors were handed over to the Australian Government. The best bower anchor was officially presented to the South Australian Government on 1 March 1974 and was immediately placed on display at the Art Gallery of South Australia. In 1986, it was transferred to the collection of the newly created South Australian Maritime Museum in Port Adelaide.

The stream anchor was retained by the Australian Government for possible inclusion in the collection of a proposed national transport museum. It was subsequently added to the collection of the National Museum of Australia in Canberra.

== Significance ==
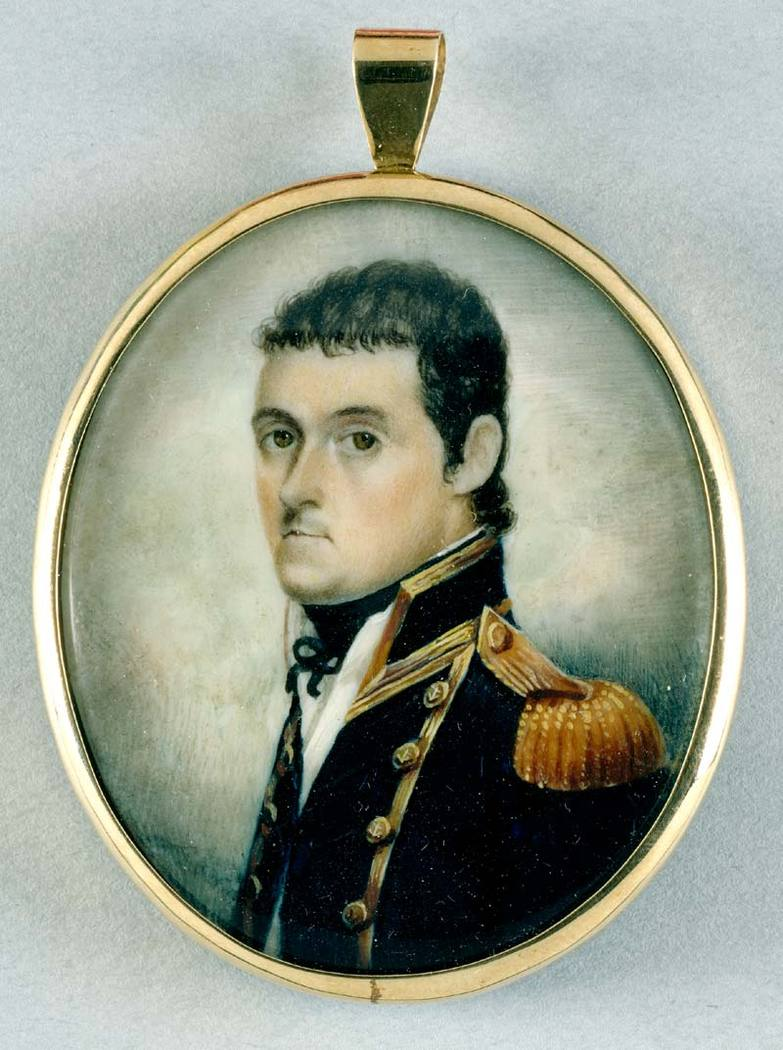
Portrait miniature of Matthew Flinders in 1801

The Collection statement for the Best Bower Anchor, prepared by the South Australian Maritime Museum, advises the following:

Matthew Flinders was the first to chart the then uncompleted coastline of South Australia and use the name Australia for the continent. The anchor is one of the few remaining physical relics linked to Flinders' exploration of the southern coastline and one of the earliest relics of European presence in South Australia.

The Collection statement prepared by the National Museum of Australia for the Stream Anchor advises the following:

This collection highlights one of the important voyages of discovery and the naming of Australia by Matthew Flinders. Flinders circumnavigated Australia and confirmed its island status after many years of conjecture and uncertainty.

== Aftermath ==
The positive public response to the successful UEC expedition was a major driver in the creation in 1974, by Seton and others, of a dedicated amateur maritime archaeology organisation, the Society for Underwater Historical Research (SUHR). Many of the approaches used by the UEC during the expedition, such as seeking major corporate sponsorship, engagement with both political leaders and local communities, and the pro-active use of print and electronic media, were continued in the work of the SUHR, particularly on projects concerning the Loch Vennachar and Water Witch shipwrecks.

The recovery of the anchors, and their connection to the voyage of HMS Investigator, is commemorated in the inclusion of the best bower anchor and the outline of the Australian continent on the SUHR emblem.

== See also ==
- A Voyage to Terra Australis by Matthew Flinders
