= Falie =

Historic sailboat in Port Adelaide, South Australia

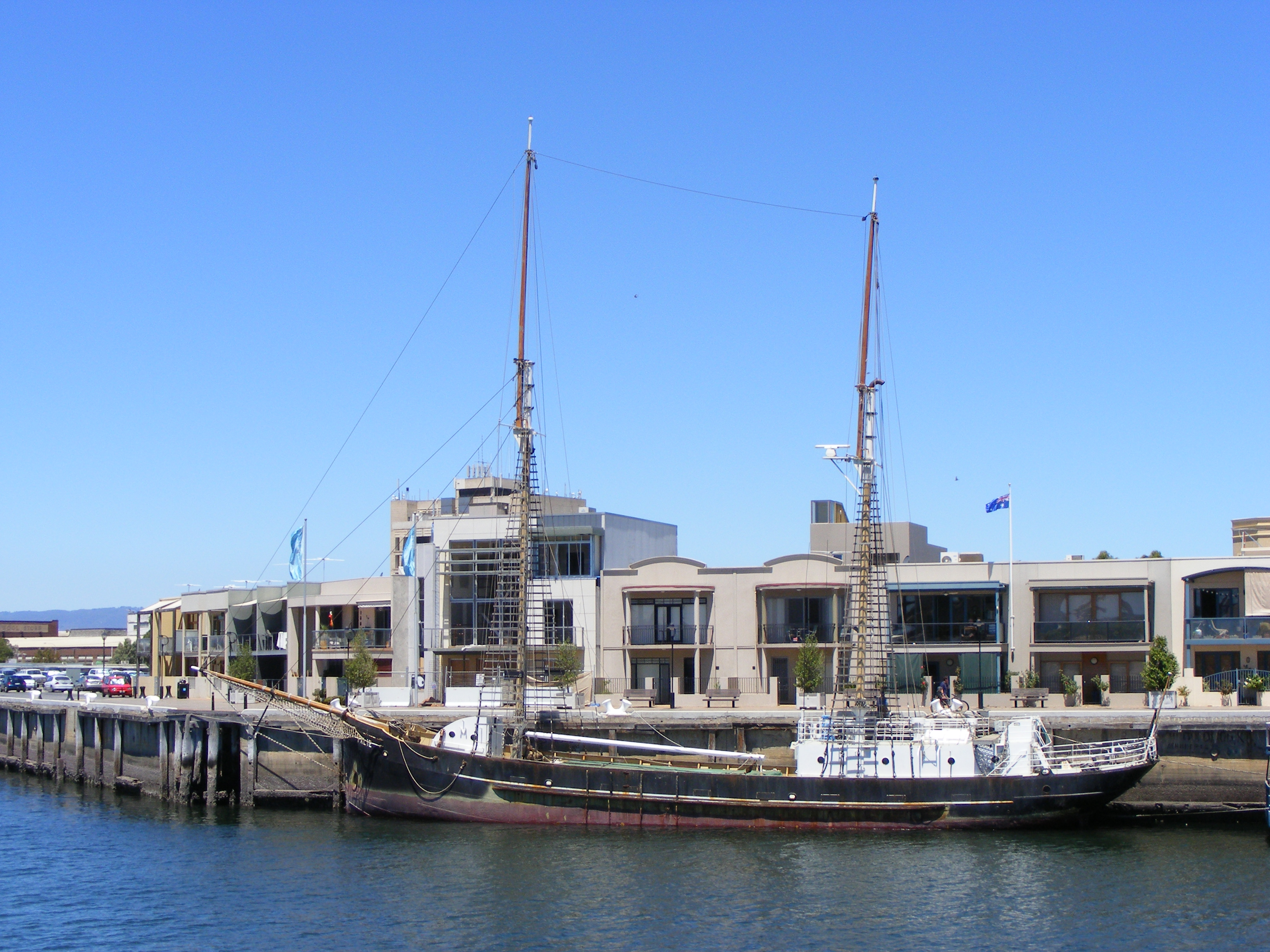
- Falie

History

Australia
- Name: Hollands Trouw (1919–1922); Falie (1922–present)
- Owner: Spencer's Gulf Transport Company (1922–1982); South Australian government (1980s-present)
- Completed: 1919

Falie is a 33.4-metre (110 ft) ketch that traded for many years in Australian waters. Originally built in 1919/1920 as a speculation by her builder, rigged as a schooner and named Hollands Trouw after the shipyard where she was built, she was purchased by the Spencer's Gulf Transport Company, renamed, and used for coastal trading in South Australia. The vessel was commissioned into the Royal Australian Navy (RAN) as HMAS Falie during World War II, serving first as an examination vessel primarily patrolling the Port of Sydney, Australia, then as an armed stores ship.

Returned to her owners in 1946, Falie was used to transport timber, general cargo, grain and explosives around Australia before resuming the South Australian coastal trade to Kangaroo Island and on occasion carrying bulk gypsum from Stenhouse Bay from 1968. She was retired in 1982, then purchased by the South Australian government for preservation. Although initially used for day and overnight sails, by 2005 the ship had to be taken out of survey due to lack of maintenance and funds.

== Design and construction ==
She was built in Maassluis, Netherlands by W. Richter Uitdenbogaardt, as a gaff rigged schooner in 1919 and named Hollands Trouw. At the time she was built as a speculation by the builder, in the hope of selling her to a prospective buyer. As a result, she sat idle after her launch in 1919 until purchased by Spencer's Gulf Transport Company in 1922. After the purchase, the vessel was fitted with a 100 hp auxiliary engine, and made ready with other alterations for the voyage to Australia.

== Operational history ==
She was bought by the Spencer's Gulf Transport Company Limited in 1922, and named Falie, after the captain's wife, Philomena "Falie" Garnaut. In 1923, she sailed to South Australia, and participated in the extensive ketch trade to isolated towns along the coast of South Australia, as well as interstate ports. She also participated in the grain trade, lightering bagged wheat to the windjammers that called at Port Victoria, in South Australia, which as the last port of call in the world for wind-powered ocean-going cargo ships, is significant in world history.

During World War II, the Royal Australian Navy requisitioned Falie, and commissioned her as HMAS Falie. The Navy added a bridge to the top of the Falie's cabin. Initially she was used as an examination vessel challenging and identifying vessels entering the Port of Sydney. On the night of 31 May 1942, she was acting as one of the sentry vessels outside Sydney Harbour when she struck a Japanese midget submarine trying to infiltrate the harbour. Falie was converted in 1943 to a stores vessel, and was deployed to Papua New Guinea. For this role the Navy added two 20mm Oerlikon cannons on platforms mounted on Falie's bow and stern. In this role, the Falie sailed widely throughout the islands of Southeast Asia delivering stores and saw action landing troops in enemy territory by night.

In 1946, she was de-commissioned and returned to her owners in South Australia. For the next 22 years, she carried timber, general cargo and explosives around the Australian coast, going as far west as Bunbury, as far south to Tasmanian ports such as Strahan, Hobart, Port Huon, and Esperance, and as far north as Cairns, with all ports in between. In 1968, she returned to South Australian waters as a replacement for the schooner Coomonderry in the gypsum and general cargo trade to Kangaroo Island, where she continued to operate as a trading vessel until she was laid up in 1982, and put up for sale, the last ketch to operate commercially in South Australian waters, and one of the last sail-powered trading vessels in Australian waters, the Tasmanian-based vessel Lady Jillian being the other.

Operating as an overnight charter vessel between 1986 and 2005, Falie supported fishing and diving tours around the South Australian coastline. Between 1990 and 2005, Falie was the primary vessel used for Rodney Fox Shark Expeditions. Here she featured in many international nature documentaries, filming and photographing great white sharks off South Australia's coast, and entertaining tourists from Australia and around the world on shark cage diving adventures.

== Preservation ==
Falie was purchased by the Government of South Australia in 1982 and rebuilt as the centre-piece of the State's Jubilee 150 celebrations in 1986, with re-masting, new sails, and the fitting of new accommodation and a galley. With this arrangement, she could carry up to 70 passengers on day trips, or 20 passengers plus nine crew overnight, as well as cargo, and equipment for adventure cruises and shark dive trips.

In 2005, a survey revealed that her hull plates had deteriorated to the point where she was no longer able to be kept in survey. She was not returned to seaworthiness as no sponsor could be found to cover the cost of repairs, estimated to be more than a million dollars.

In 2007, it was proposed to move Falie to the wharf at American River, Kangaroo Island as an interpretive maritime museum, but by 2009, this had not been acted on. It was suggested that the South Australian government was looking to divest itself of Falie, and that the estimated cost of repairs to the hull was in excess of $3 million. Falie is currently owned by the SA Department of Planning, Transport and Infrastructure (formerly DTEI).

In 2017, Falie was one of the ships considered in a study funded by Renewal SA about "a strategy for berthing or locating historic ships and vessels within the inner harbour of Port Adelaide."
