= Yelta (tugboat) =

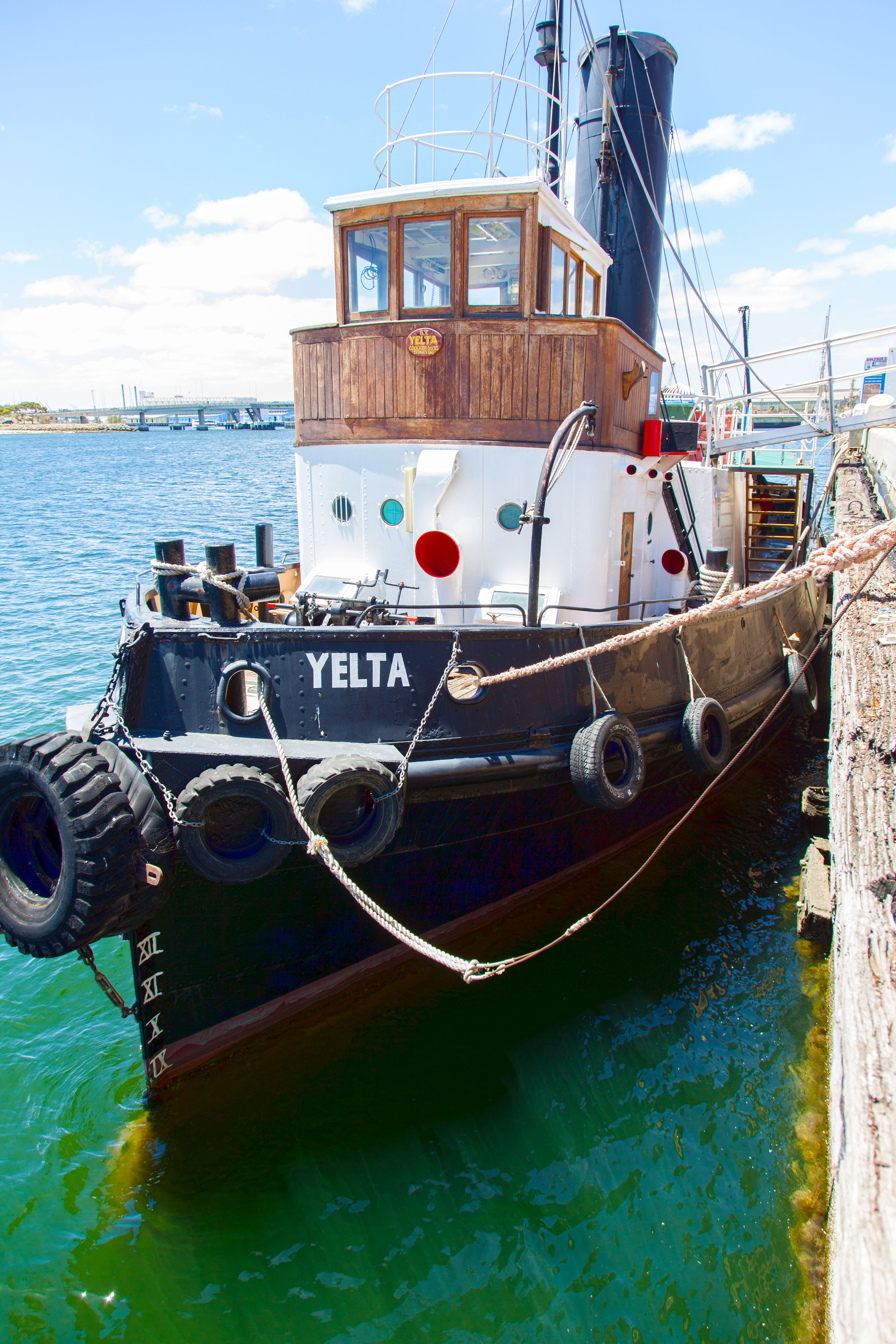
- ST Yelta

History

Australia
- Name: ST Yelta
- Owner: Ritch and Smith Ltd
- Builder: Cockatoo Docks & Engineering Company
- Completed: 1948
- Maiden voyage: February 1949
- In service: 1949
- Out of service: 1976
- Home port: Port Adelaide
- Fate: Retired; sold 1985

Australia
- Name: Yelta
- Owner: South Australian Maritime Museum
- Acquired: 1985
- Recommissioned: 1988
- Home port: Port Adelaide
- Identification: IMO number: 5395539
- Status: Museum Ship

General characteristics
- Length: 31.47 metres (103.25 ft)
- Beam: 8.13 metres (26.66 ft)
- Draught: 4.0 metres (13 ft)
- Propulsion: steam engine
- Crew: 6

Yelta is a steam tug which operated in the Australian state of South Australia from 1949 to 1976 within both the Port River and the waters of Gulf St Vincent immediately adjoining the river's mouth. After being laid up for about nine years, she was purchased in 1985 by the Government of South Australia for addition to the collection of the South Australian Maritime Museum as a museum ship. As of 1985, she was considered to be the only remaining steam-powered tug operating within Australian waters.

Yelta was built at the Cockatoo Island Dockyard in Sydney, during 1948 by the Cockatoo Docks & Engineering Company for Ritch & Smith of Port Adelaide, South Australia.

After an 11-day voyage from Sydney, Yelta arrived in Port Adelaide on 22 February 1949. Until her retirement in 1976, she assisted vessels to and from docks and other facilities within the Port River. She also assisted in refloating vessels that ran aground within the Port River such as Eastwave in 1950, Caltex Bombay in 1952, and Ulooloo and Trykori in 1953.

Yelta was retired from service in November 1976. The Port Adelaide branch of the National Trust of South Australia purchased the vessel with the objective of making "a feature of a maritime museum on a lease it holds on land on Cruickshank corner near the Birkenhead Bridge." The plan for a maritime museum did not proceed due to the plans of the Government of South Australia to develop facilities for the South Australian Maritime Museum. In 1985, the National Trust offered the vessel for sale by tender in order to recover some of the costs expended on its own museum proposal and subsequently accepted an offer from the South Australian government who added the vessel to the collection of its maritime museum.

The vessel was restored by South Australian Maritime Museum in order to "operate as both a floating museum and functional passenger vessel." Using a team of "retired and semi-retired volunteers with lengthy and comprehensive experience in various maritime industries," the vessel was re-launched on 5 October 1988 after three years of restoration.

In 1985, Yelta was reported as being "Australia's last working steam-powered tug" and in 2017, it was described as a "historic vessel with strong associations with Port Adelaide, it is the only steam vessel on the river."

In 2017, Yelta was one of the ships considered in a study funded by Renewal SA about "a strategy for berthing or locating historic ships and vessels within the inner harbour of Port Adelaide."
