= South Australian Maritime Museum =

Coordinates: 34°50′35″S 138°30′23″E

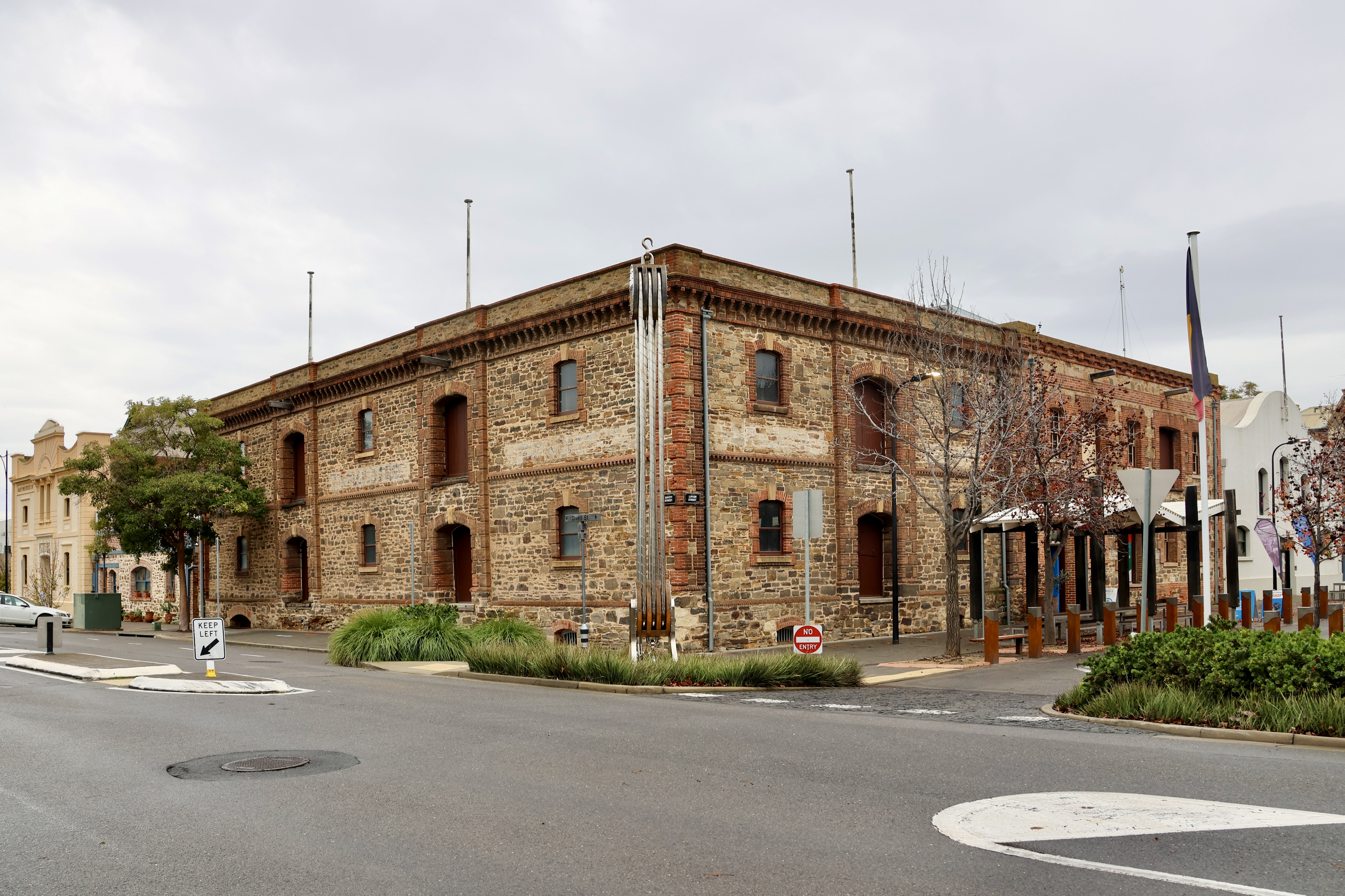
- The museum in 2026

- Location within South Australia
- Established: 1986
- Location: Port Adelaide, South Australia
- Type: Maritime museum
- Website: https://maritime.history.sa.gov.au/

The South Australian Maritime Museum is a state government museum, part of the History Trust of South Australia. The museum opened in 1986 in a collection of historic buildings in the heart of Port Adelaide, South Australia's first heritage precinct.

== Description ==
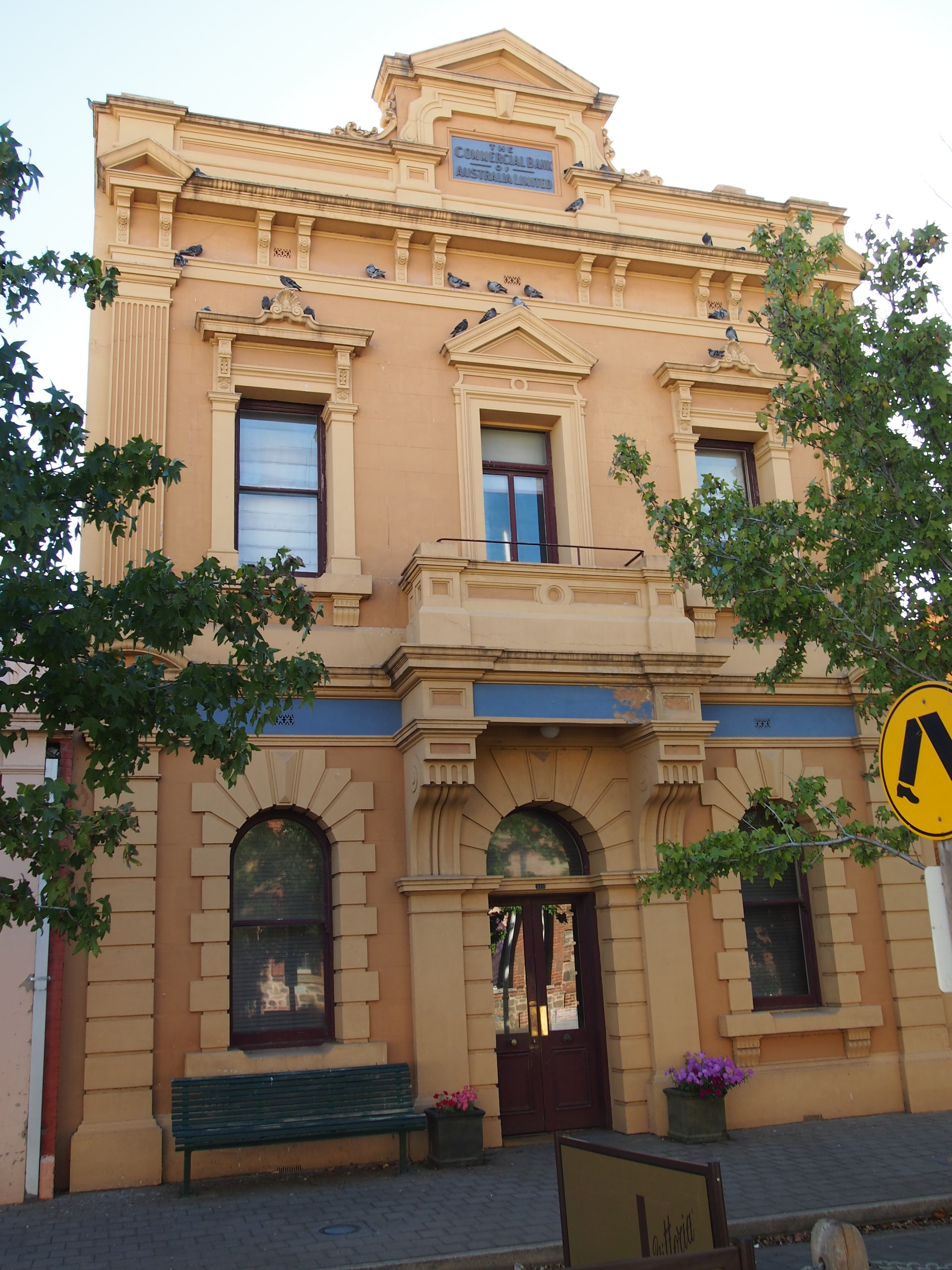
The SA Maritime Museum's offices in Lipson Street, built in 1888.

The museum presents exhibitions in a pair of adjoining stone bond stores, built in the 1850s. It offers visitors the opportunity to climb the Port Adelaide lighthouse that was built in 1869 and originally stood at the entrance to the Port River. Cruises are provided for school groups in the naval launch Archie Badenoch (built 1942) and periodically for the public in the steam tug Yelta (built 1949). The museum presents an active program of changing exhibitions, tours of the museum and of the Torrens Island Quarantine Station, vacation performances, schools programs and events including historic dinners, music and theatre. It has a reputation as an interactive museum that delivers imaginative programming.

Exhibitions focus on the exploration of the southern coast and the voyages of Matthew Flinders and Nicolas Baudin, the experiences of immigrants coming to Australia in the 1830s, 1910s and 1950s, health and medicine at sea, the colonial navy of South Australia of the 19th century, the world wars of the 20th century, the ketch traders that served southern ports from the 19th century to the 1960s, life in port, and the ecology of the Port River dolphins. Among its many artifacts is Matthew Flinders' "Best Bower" anchor, which was lost in 1803 and recovered by the Underwater Explorers Club in 1973.

The Maritime Museum also preserves the Weman Sailmakers loft (1864), and has its offices in the former Commercial Bank building (1888), both in Lipson Street, across from the museum.

== Collection ==
The Maritime Museum builds on the legacy of previous organisations including the Port Adelaide Institute. The museum holds in trust, a collection that the institute founded in 1872 and is now the oldest nautical collection in Australia.

Today, the museum's collection includes more than 20,000 objects that represent voyages that shaped the map and moments that shaped daily life. The collection includes Captain Cook’s travelling chest, the plaque that Matthew Flinders left at Memory Cove in 1802 to mourn the loss of seafarers, the trophy that Hilda Harvey won for the 1930 Swim Through the Port, and the boots that once belonged to ketch skipper Skug Cutler.

Exploration is one of the strengths of the collection with objects from the voyages of Macassan seafarers, Nicolas Baudin, Matthew Flinders, and John Franklin. The colonial navy of South Australia is another strength including the contingent that took HMCS Protector to the Boxer Rebellion in 1900. The museum preserves 17 figureheads, the largest collection in Australia with the earliest being the Ville de Bourdeaux, built in 1836. The museum holds very good collections of vintage swimwear, material from the Adelaide Steamship Company, from the Gulf Trip that offered tours from 1906 to 1955, and the grain trade which delivered wheat and barley to Europe by windjammers rounding Cape Horn in sail up until 1949. It also holds an extensive maritime archaeology collection which has been transferred to it by the South Australian government's Heritage Unit.

== Exhibitions ==
In 2016 the museum hosted the inaugural showing of a two-year national travelling exhibition from the Museum d’Histoire Naturelle du Havre, celebrating the French explorer Nicolas Baudin's 1800—1804 voyage, which included his mapping of the southern coast of Australia, and his meeting with Matthew Flinders at Encounter Bay in present-day South Australia.

== Vessels ==
The Maritime Museum provides cruises on two vessels: the steam tug Yelta and the navy work boat Archie Badenoch. Yelta was built at Cockatoo Island Dockyard in 1949 and fitted with a steam engine that had been built for a corvette but was left surplus when the war ended. Archie Badenoch was built by GMH's Birkenhead factory in 1942 for the Royal Australian Navy and was later used as South Australia's police rescue launch. The oldest vessels in the collection are the timber ketch Annie Watt that was built in 1870 and the iron trader Nelcebee that was shipped from Scotland in parts and launched in Port Adelaide's Inner Harbor in 1883. Both are stored on hard stand. The collection also includes Sir James Hardy’s championship sailing dinghies, fishing cutters and a naval whaler.

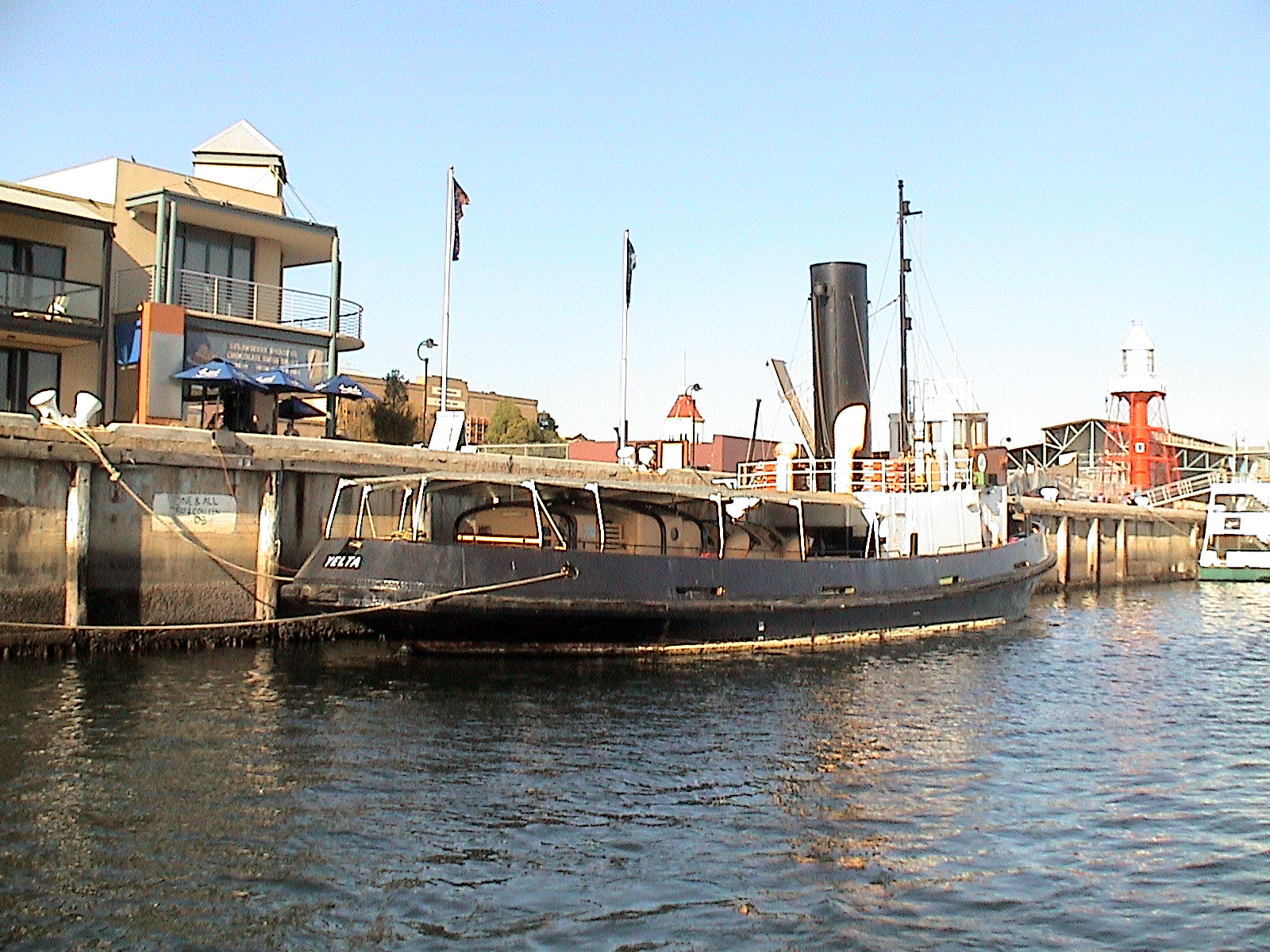
The steam tug Yelta

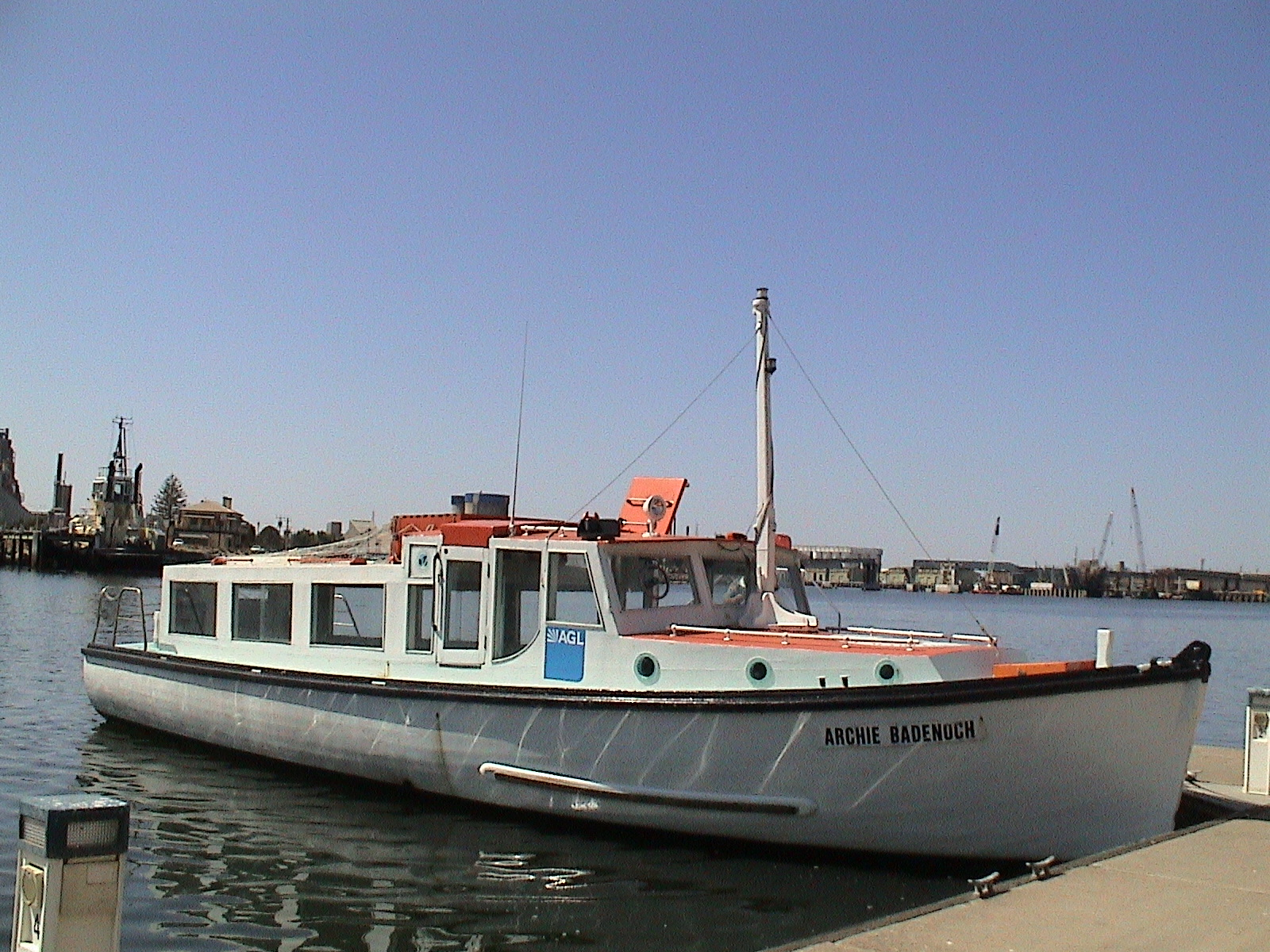
The Archie Badenoch

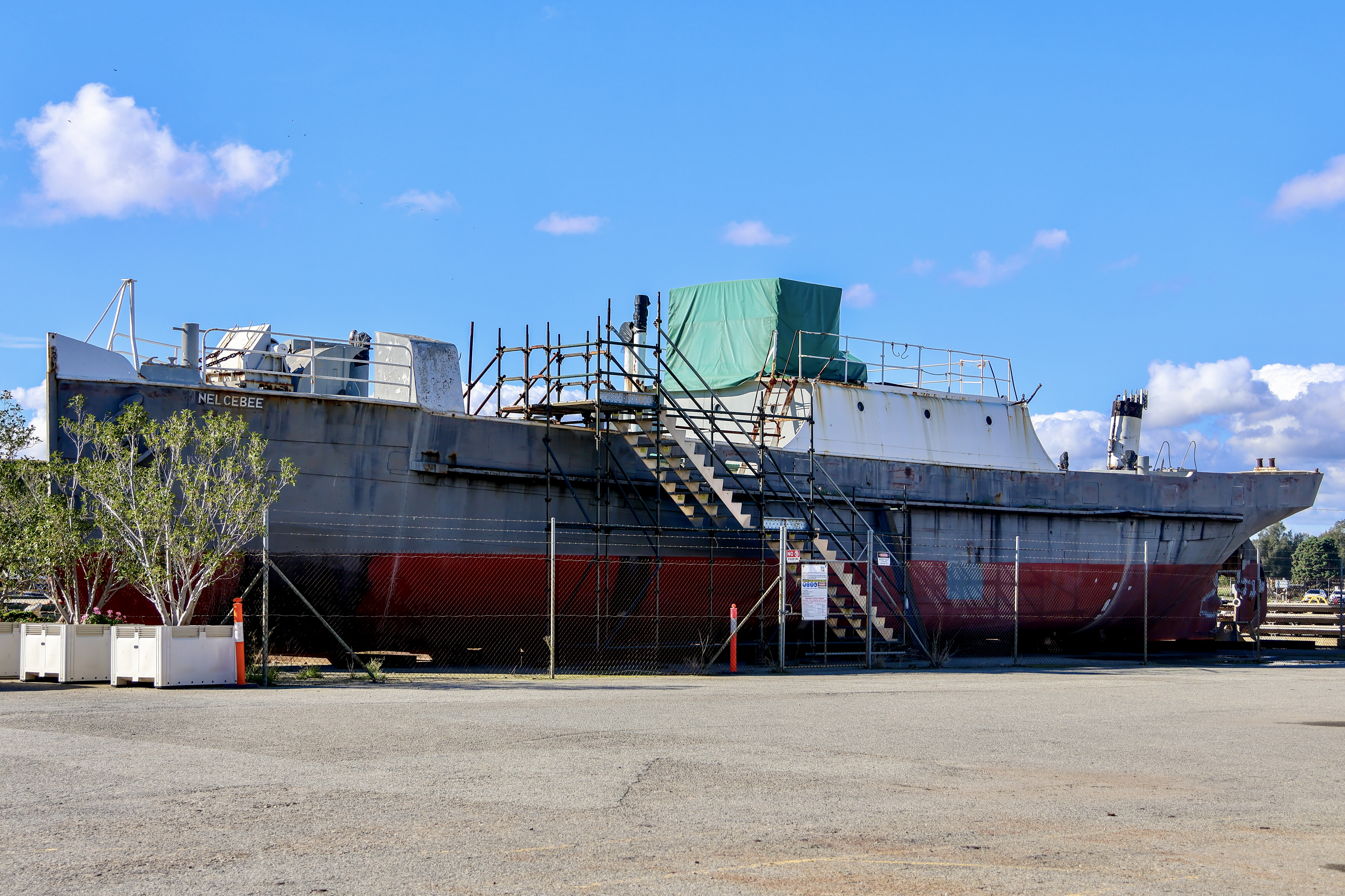
The ketch Nelcebee

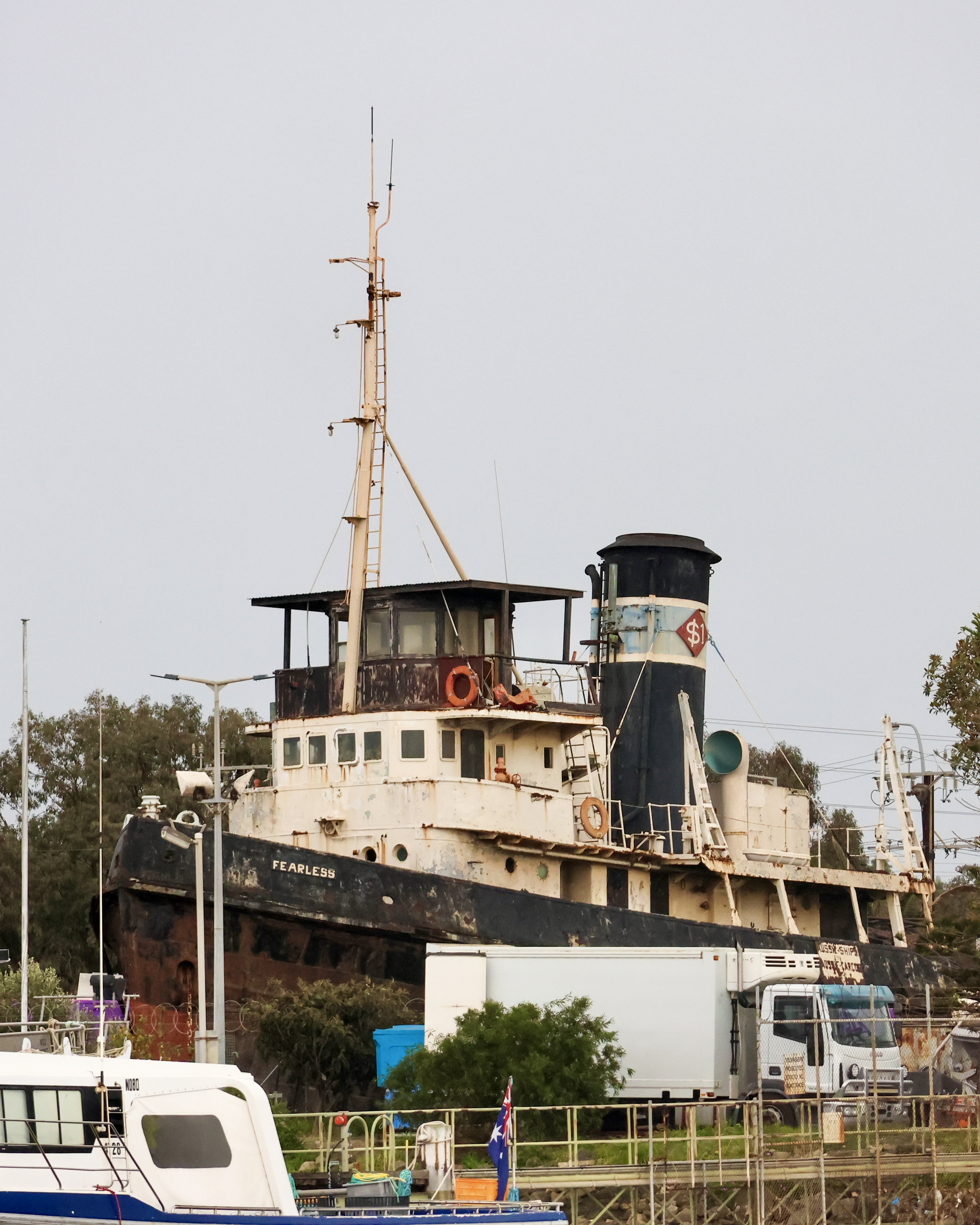
The steam tug Fearless

== See also ==
- HMS Investigator Anchors
