= Arte River =

River in Victoria, Australia

Arte Arter, Glen Arte
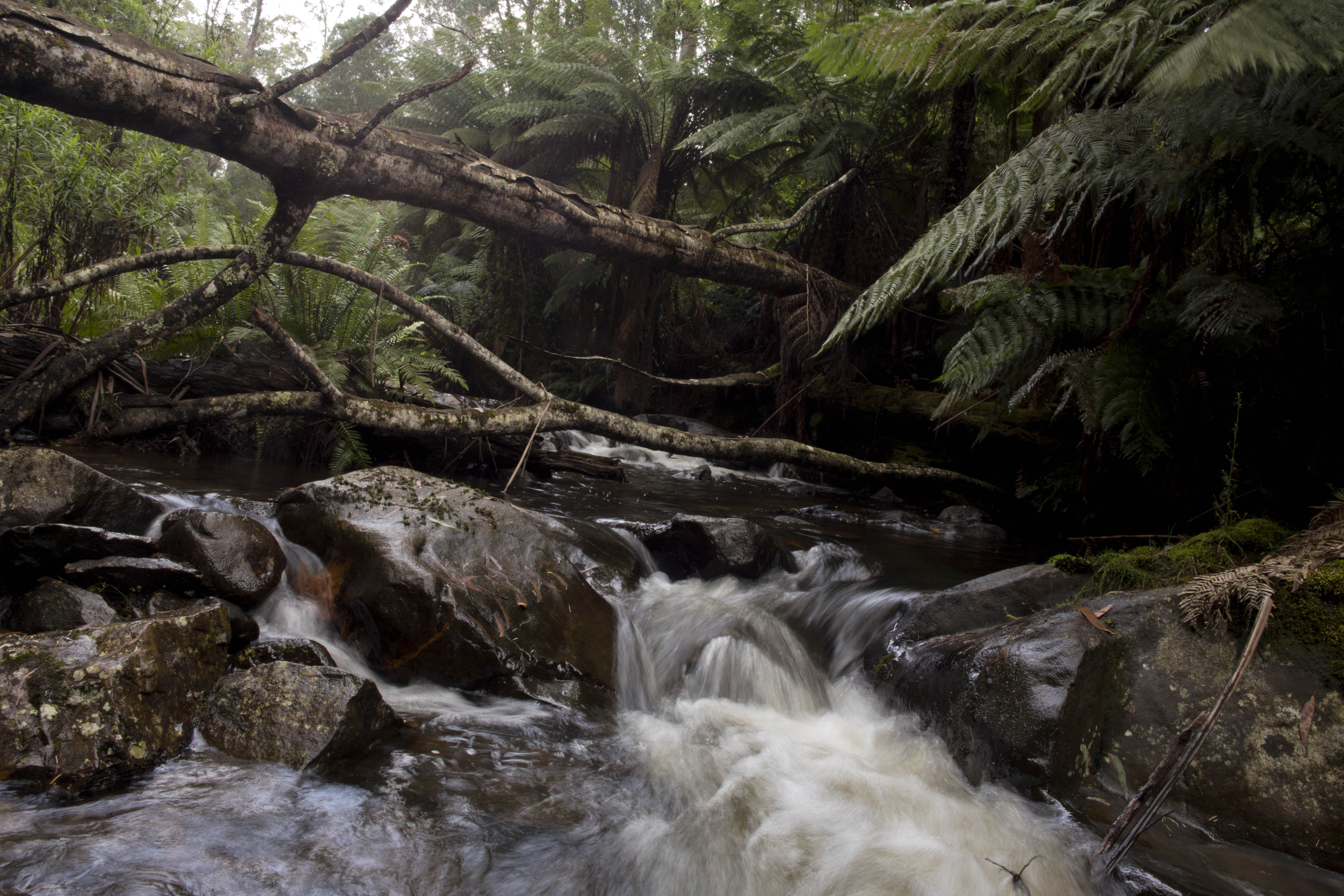
- The Arte River runs through the Glen Arte Botanical reserve in the Kuark Forest in East Gippsland Victoria, Australia. This photo is from there.

- Mouth of the Arte River in Victoria

Location
- Country: Australia
- State: Victoria
- Region: South East Corner (IBRA), East Gippsland
- Local government area: Shire of East Gippsland
- Locality: Goolengook

Physical characteristics
- Source: Mount Kuark
  - location: Errinundra National Park
  - elevation: 448 m (1,470 ft)
- Mouth: confluence with the Goolengook River
  - location: northwest of Cann River
  - coordinates: 37°30′31″S 148°51′6″E
  - elevation: 219 m (719 ft)
- Length: 17 km (11 mi)

Basin features
- River system: Bemm River catchment
- Tributaries
  - right: Little Arte River
- National park: Errinundra NP

The Arte River is a perennial river of the Bemm River catchment, in the East Gippsland region of the Australian state of Victoria.

== Course and features ==
Arte River rises below Mount Kuark, in remote country in the Errinundra National Park, and flows generally south and then east, joined by the Little Arte River before reaching its confluence with the Goolengook River, northwest of the town of Cann River in the Shire of East Gippsland. The river descends 273 metres (896 ft) over its 17 kilometres (11 mi) course.

The Arte River sub-catchment area is managed by the East Gippsland Catchment Management Authority.

== See also ==
- List of rivers of Australia
