= Goolengook River =

Goolengook
- Mouth of the Goolengook River in Victoria
- Etymology: Aboriginal Bidawal

Location
- Country: Australia
- State: Victoria
- Region: South East Corner (IBRA), East Gippsland
- Local government area: Shire of East Gippsland
- Locality: Goolengook

Physical characteristics
- Source: Mount Ellery
  - location: Errinundra National Park
  - elevation: 444 m (1,457 ft)
- Mouth: confluence with the Bemm River
  - location: west of Cann River
  - coordinates: 37°33′13″S 148°54′50″E
  - elevation: 90 m (300 ft)
- Length: 27 km (17 mi)

Basin features
- River system: Bemm River catchment
- Tributaries
  - left: Black Watch Creek
  - right: Little Goolengook River, Arte River
- National park: Errinundra NP

The Goolengook River is a perennial river of the Bemm River catchment, in the East Gippsland region of the Australian state of Victoria.

== Course and features ==
Goolengook River rises below Mount Ellery, near Ellery Camp, in remote country in the Errinundra National Park, and flows generally south by east, joined by the Little Goolengook and Arte rivers and one minor tributary, before reaching its confluence with the Bemm River, west of the town of Cann River in the Shire of East Gippsland. The river descends 353 metres (1,158 ft) over its 27-kilometre (17 mi) course.

The Goolengook River sub-catchment area is managed by the East Gippsland Catchment Management Authority.

== See also ==
- List of rivers of Australia
