= Little Arte River =

Little Arte
- Mouth of the Little Arte River in Victoria

Location
- Country: Australia
- State: Victoria
- Region: South East Corner (IBRA), East Gippsland
- Local government area: Shire of East Gippsland
- Locality: Goolengook

Physical characteristics
- Source: Bald Mount
  - location: Errinundra National Park
  - elevation: 824 m (2,703 ft)
- Mouth: confluence with the Arte River
  - location: northwest of Cann River
  - coordinates: 37°31′14″S 148°49′53″E
  - elevation: 190 m (620 ft)
- Length: 10 km (6.2 mi)

Basin features
- River system: Bemm River catchment
- National park: Errinundra NP

The Little Arte River is a perennial river of the Bemm River catchment, in the East Gippsland region of the Australian state of Victoria.

== Course and features ==
Little Arte River rises below Bald Mount, in remote country in the Errinundra National Park, and flows generally north and then east, before reaching its confluence with the Arte River, northwest of the town of Cann River in the Shire of East Gippsland. The river descends 633 metres (2,077 ft) over its 10-kilometre (6.2 mi) course.

The Little Arte River sub-catchment area is managed by the East Gippsland Catchment Management Authority.

== See also ==
- List of rivers of Australia
