= Ada River (East Gippsland, Victoria) =

River in Victoria, Australia

Ada
- Mouth of the Ada River in Victoria

Location
- Country: Australia
- State: Victoria
- Region: South East Corner (IBRA), East Gippsland
- Local government area: Shire of East Gippsland

Physical characteristics
- Source: Mount Ellery
  - location: Errinundra National Park
  - elevation: 1,150 m (3,770 ft)
- Mouth: confluence with the Errinundra River
  - location: near Tommy Roundhead Hill
  - coordinates: 37°24′9″S 148°53′36″E
  - elevation: 196 m (643 ft)
- Length: 11 km (6.8 mi)

Basin features
- River system: Bemm River catchment
- National park: Errinundra NP

The Ada River is a perennial river of the Bemm River catchment, in the East Gippsland region of the Australian state of Victoria.

== Course and features ==
Ada River rises below Mount Ellery, part of the Errinundra Plateau, in remote country in the Errinundra National Park, and flows generally south by east, before reaching its confluence with the Errinundra River, near Tommy Roundhead Hill, northwest of the town of Cann River in the Shire of East Gippsland. The river descends 957 metres (3,140 ft) over its 11 kilometres (6.8 mi) course.

The Ada River sub-catchment area is managed by the East Gippsland Catchment Management Authority.

== See also ==
- List of rivers of Australia
