= Little Goolengook River =

Little Goolengook
- Mouth of the Little Goolengook River in Victoria
- Etymology: Aboriginal Bidawal

Location
- Country: Australia
- State: Victoria
- Region: South East Corner (IBRA), East Gippsland
- LGA: Shire of East Gippsland
- Locality: Goolengook

Physical characteristics
- Source: Bee Tree Hill
  - location: Errinundra National Park
  - elevation: 726 m (2,382 ft)
- Mouth: confluence with the Goolengook River
  - location: northwest of Cann River
  - coordinates: 37°28′22″S 148°50′11″E
  - elevation: 219 m (719 ft)
- Length: 7 km (4.3 mi)

Basin features
- River system: Bemm River catchment
- National park: Errinundra NP

The Little Goolengook River is a perennial river of the Bemm River catchment, in the East Gippsland region of the Australian state of Victoria.

== Course and features ==
Little Goolengook River rises below Bee Tree Hill, in remote country in the Errinundra National Park, and flows generally south and then east, before reaching its confluence with the Goolengook River, northwest of the town of Cann River in the Shire of East Gippsland. The river descends 506 metres (1,660 ft) over its 7-kilometre (4.3 mi) course.

The Little Goolengook River sub-catchment area is managed by the East Gippsland Catchment Management Authority.

== See also ==
- List of rivers of Australia
