= Errinundra River =

Errinundra Erinunderra
- Mouth of the Errinundra River in Victoria

Location
- Country: Australia
- State: Victoria
- Region: South East Corner (IBRA), East Gippsland
- Local government area: Shire of East Gippsland

Physical characteristics
- Source: Cobb Hill, Errinundra Plateau
  - location: Errinundra National Park
  - elevation: 972 m (3,189 ft)
- Mouth: confluence with the Combienbar River to form the Bemm River
  - location: near Boulder Flat
  - coordinates: 37°28′34″S 148°55′39″E
  - elevation: 129 m (423 ft)
- Length: 28 km (17 mi)

Basin features
- River system: Bemm River catchment
- Tributaries
  - right: Nixon Creek, Ada River, Shady Creek, Kanuka Creek, St Johns Creek, Bola Creek
- National park: Errinundra NP

The Errinundra River is a perennial river of the Bemm River catchment, in the East Gippsland region of the Australian state of Victoria.

== Course and features ==
Errinundra River rises below Cobb Hill, part of the Errinundra Plateau, in remote country in the Errinundra National Park, and flows generally south by east, joined by the Ada River and five minor tributaries, before reaching its confluence with the Combienbar River to form the Bemm River, near Boulder Flat, northwest of the town of Cann River in the Shire of East Gippsland. The river descends 844 metres (2,769 ft) over its 28-kilometre (17 mi) course.

The Errinundra River sub-catchment area is managed by the East Gippsland Catchment Management Authority.

== See also ==
- List of rivers of Australia
