= Saint Patricks River =

Saint Patricks Saint Patricks River West Branch, Saint Patricks River East Branch
- Mouth of the Saint Patricks River in Victoria

Location
- Country: Australia
- State: Victoria
- Region: South East Corner (IBRA), East Gippsland
- Local government area: Shire of East Gippsland

Physical characteristics
- Source: Mount Jack
  - location: Errinundra National Park
  - elevation: 412 m (1,352 ft)
- Source confluence: East Branch and West Branch of Saint Patricks River
- Mouth: confluence with the Big River
  - location: near Malinns
  - coordinates: 37°27′19″S 148°43′4″E
  - elevation: 184 m (604 ft)
- Length: 9 km (5.6 mi)

Basin features
- River system: Snowy River catchment
- National park: Errinundra NP

Not to be confused with Saint Patrick River in Grenada

The Saint Patricks River is a perennial river of the Snowy River catchment, in the East Gippsland region of the Australian state of Victoria.

== Course and features ==
Formed by the confluence of the East Branch and West Branch of the river, the Saint Patricks River rises below Mount Jack within the Errinundra National Park, and flows generally north northwest, before reaching its confluence with the Big River, in remote country southwest of the locality of Malinns in the Shire of East Gippsland. The river descends 184 metres (604 ft) over its 9-kilometre (5.6 mi) course.

The catchment area of the river is administered by the East Gippsland Catchment Management Authority.

== See also ==
- List of rivers of Australia
