= Rich River =

Rich
- Mouth of the Rich River in Victoria

Location
- Country: Australia
- State: Victoria
- Region: South East Corner (IBRA), East Gippsland
- Local government area: Shire of East Gippsland

Physical characteristics
- Source: Mount Jack
  - location: Errinundra National Park
  - elevation: 639 m (2,096 ft)
- Mouth: confluence with the Brodribb River
  - location: east of the Bonang Highway
  - coordinates: 37°32′46″S 148°34′36″E
  - elevation: 71 m (233 ft)
- Length: 17 km (11 mi)

Basin features
- River system: Snowy River catchment
- National park: Errinundra NP

The Rich River is a perennial river of the Snowy River catchment, in the East Gippsland region of the Australian state of Victoria.

== Course and features ==
The Rich River rises below Mount Jack within the Errinundra National Park, and flows generally southwest, before reaching its confluence with the Brodribb River, in remote a state forestry area east of the Bonang Highway in the Shire of East Gippsland. The river descends 568 metres (1,864 ft) over its 17-kilometre (11 mi) course.

The catchment area of the river is administered by the East Gippsland Catchment Management Authority.

== See also ==
- List of rivers of Australia
