= Big River (Brodribb River, Victoria) =

Big
- Mouth of the Big River in Victoria

Location
- Country: Australia
- State: Victoria
- Region: South East Corner (IBRA), East Gippsland
- Local government area: Shire of East Gippsland

Physical characteristics
- Source: Bee Tree Hill
  - location: Errinundra National Park
  - elevation: 309 m (1,014 ft)
- Mouth: confluence with the Brodribb River
  - location: near Malinns
  - coordinates: 37°26′23″S 148°40′53″E
  - elevation: 207 m (679 ft)
- Length: 10 km (6.2 mi)

Basin features
- River system: Snowy River catchment
- Tributaries
  - left: Saint Patricks River
- National park: Errinundra NP

The Big River is a perennial river of the Snowy River catchment, in the East Gippsland region of the Australian state of Victoria.

== Course and features ==
The Big River rises below Big Tree Hill within the Errinundra National Park, and flows generally westerly, joined by the Saint Patricks River, before reaching its confluence with the Brodribb River, in remote country southwest of the locality of Malinns in the Shire of East Gippsland. The river descends 101 metres (331 ft) over its 10-kilometre (6.2 mi) course.

The catchment area of the river is administered by the East Gippsland Catchment Management Authority.

== See also ==
- List of rivers of Australia
