= Forests of Australia =

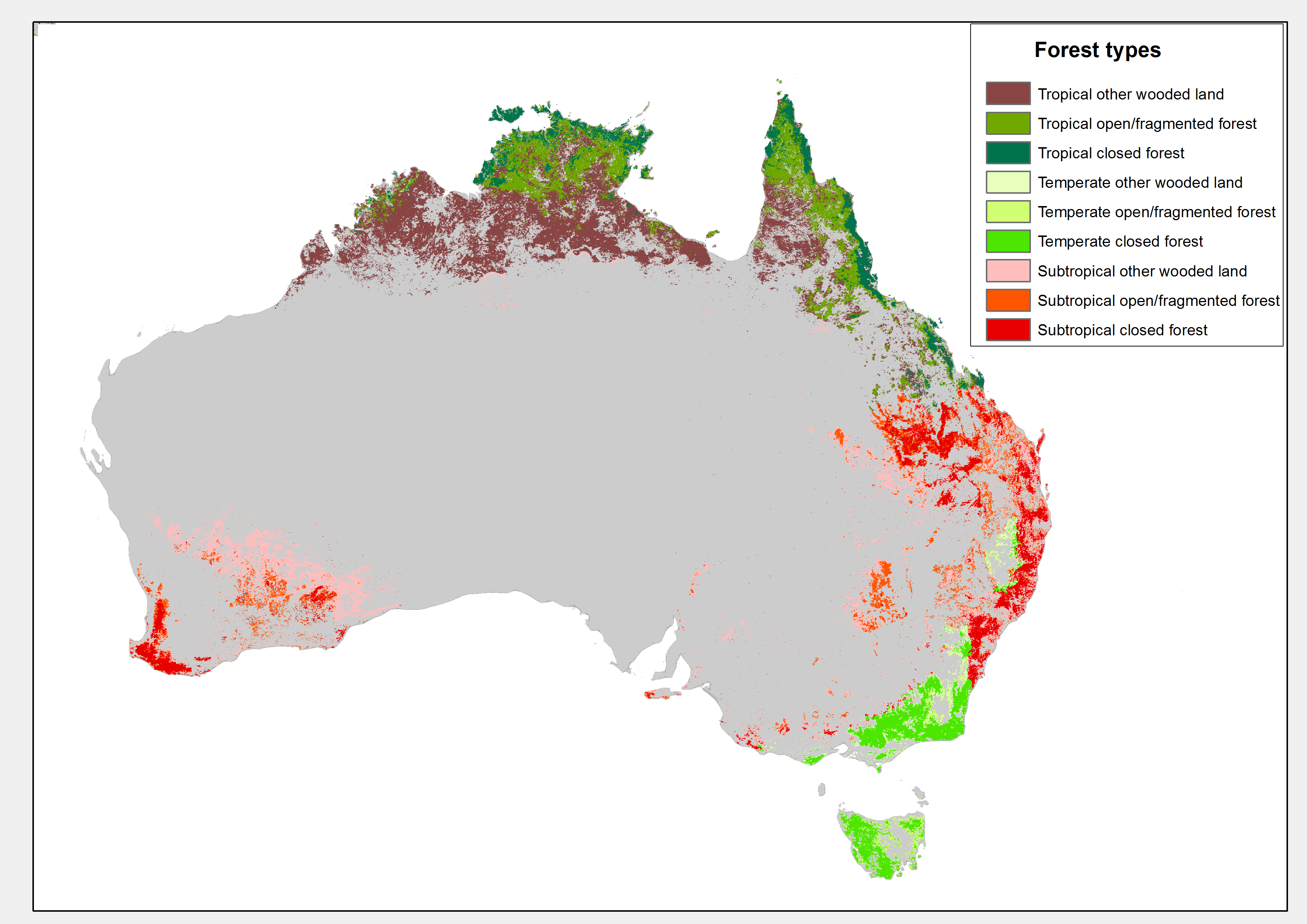
Australian forest cover

Total employment in forestry and logging in Australia (thousands of people) since 1984

Australia has many forests of importance due to significant features, despite being one of the driest continents. As of 2009, Australia has approximately 147 million hectares of native forest, which represents about 19% of Australia's land area.

The majority of Australia's trees are hardwoods, typically eucalypts, rather than softwoods like pine. While softwoods dominate some native forests, their total area is judged insufficient to constitute a major forest type in Australia's National Forest Inventory. The Forests Australia website provides up-to-date information on Australia's forests. Detailed information on Australia's forests is available from Australia's State of the Forests reports that are published every five years.

Since the arrival of European settlers starting from 1788 Australia has lost 40% of its original forest cover. The shift affected especially the most fertile areas of the country as the main driver has been forest clearing for agriculture.

== Forest types ==
There are 458 forest communities distributed across Australia. These have been grouped into the following seven native forest types, which are characterised by dominant species and the structure of the forest:

- Rainforests
- Melaleuca forests
- Eucalypt forests
- Casuarina forests
- Callitris forests
- Acacia forests
- Mangrove forests

Plantation forests (softwood and hardwood) have been defined as an eighth group that covers trees planted for commercial use.

== Government ==
=== Policies ===
In Australia the states and territories are responsible for managing forests. Guidance is primarily provided by the 1992 National Forest Policy Statement (NFPS). The NFPS allows for the inclusion of Regional Forest Agreements, which are 20-year plans for the management of native forests.

=== Departments ===
- Department of Primary Industry and Fisheries in the Northern Territory
- Department of Agriculture, Fisheries and Forestry
- Department of Primary Industries and its child agency Forests NSW
- South Australian Forestry Corporation (trading as Forestry SA)
- Forestry Tasmania
- Department of Environment and Primary Industries
- Department of Environment and Conservation

== List of significant forests ==
Forest	State	Image	Notable features
Alpine National Park	Victoria		Extensive mountain ash and snowgum forests.
D'Aguilar National Park	Queensland		Large nature reserve on the western boundary of the City of Brisbane, bordering on the Mount Coot-tha Reserve, that supports a large variety of native plants and animals.
Brown Mountain forest	Victoria		Located in East Gippsland, Victoria, abuts the Errinundra National Park, and is notable for containing large tracts of old growth forest, including over fifty mountain ash trees estimated to be over 300 years old. The eucalypt forest provides key habitat for rare and threatened species such as the powerful owl, the spotted quoll, mainland Australia's largest marsupial carnivore, and the long-footed potoroo, Victoria's rarest marsupial. Campaigns to protect the area from logging led to blockades and non-violent direct action in 1990 and 2009.
Central Highlands (Victoria)	Victoria		Contain cool temperate rainforests; dominated by myrtle beech and southern sassafras, with an understorey of ferns and mosses. They may also contain eucalypt trees and Australian blackwood. Eastern forests of the Central Highlands such as the Toolangi State Forest and Melbourne's forested water catchments provide habitat for the threatened Leadbeater's possum.
Cumberland Plain Woodland	New South Wales		Found in scattered forms in the Greater Western Sydney area, it is made up of dry sclerophyll woodlands and forests, reminiscent of the Mediterranean forests, totaling only around 6400 hectares. Grey box (Eucalyptus moluccana) and forest red gum (Eucalyptus tereticornis) dominate the woodland.
Wet Tropics Rainforest	Queensland		Tropical rainforest near Tropical North Queensland. At around 1200 square kilometres the Wet Tropics Rainforest is a part of Australia's largest contiguous area of rainforest. Contains 30% of frog, marsupial and reptile species in Australia, and 65% of Australia's bat and butterfly species. 20% of bird species in the country can be found in this area including the threatened cassowary. Added to the World Heritage List in 1988. This followed campaigning by environmentalists, including blockades against logging and road construction earlier in the decade.
Disappointment Reference Area	Victoria		Extensive mountain ash (Eucalyptus regnans) forest with dense treeferns along many creeks. Prior to the 2009 Black Saturday bushfires, which burnt the majority of the reference area, this forest has not been burned since the 1700s, making many of the trees ~300 years old.
Errinundra forests	Victoria		The Errinundra National Park in East Gippland contains the largest remaining cool temperate rainforests in Victoria. These old growth forests harbour many rare and threatened species of flora and fauna, including powerful owls, tiger quolls and long-footed potoroos.
Gloucester National Park	Western Australia		Karri eucalyptus forests that includes the Gloucester Tree, Western Australia's most famous karri tree
Gondwana Rainforests of Australia	New South Wales		Remnants of Gondwanaland forests. Pictured is Point Lookout, New England National Park, NSW.
Goolengook	Victoria		Old growth cool temperate rainforest in Eastern Victoria.
Great Otway National Park	Victoria		Diverse range of landscapes and vegetation types including some old growth eucalyptus forest.
Karawatha Forest	Queensland		Protected bushland at Karawatha, Queensland.
Kinglake National Park	Victoria		While much of the forest area was logged in the early part of the 20th century, many old growth trees remain.
Lake Mountain	Victoria		Old growth mountain ash and snowgum forests, including habitat for the threatened Leadbeater's possum.
Lamington National Park	Queensland/New South Wales		Part Gondwana Rainforests of Australia of the World Heritage site on the Queensland/New South Wales border. One of the largest upland subtropical rainforest remnants in the world and the most northern southern beech cool temperate rainforest in Australia.
Leard State Forest	New South Wales		The biggest remnant of natural bushland on the Liverpool Plains in north-west NSW and the most extensive and intact stand of the nationally listed critically endangered box-gum woodland remaining in Australia. It is habitat for 34 critically endangered species and several endangered ecological communities.
Limpinwood Nature Reserve	New South Wales		World Heritage listed wilderness region of 26 km^{2} situated in the Border ranges of north eastern New South Wales. Vegetation is primarily sub-tropical rain forest with some wet sclerophyll forest.
Mount Buffalo National Park	Victoria		Over 550 native species occur; the most significant vegetation communities are the alpine and sub-alpine communities. The lower slopes have communities of mixed gum and peppermint, including the bogong gum, Eucalyptus chapmaniana. These grade into pure stands of alpine ash, Eucalyptus delegatensis around 1100 metres elevation, and subalpine woodland of snow gum, Eucalyptus pauciflora above 1300 metres. Numerous endemic plant species.
Wollumbin National Park	New South Wales		Included in the UNESCO World Heritage Listings in 1986. Extensive subtropical rainforest remnants.
Mount Read (Tasmania)	Tasmania		Despite extensive historic mining and human activity on its slopes, Mount Read has unique and significant stands of rare Huon pine forests on its slopes.
Pilliga forest	New South Wales		Australia's largest inland native forest. Covering over 450,000 hectares.
Sherbrooke Forest	Victoria		Wet sclerophyll forest with the dominant tree species being the mountain ash, Eucalyptus regnans, the tallest flowering plant in the world. The forest has recovered well from logging that occurred from the mid-19th century until 1930. Sherbrooke Forest is famous for its population of superb lyrebirds.
Springbrook National Park	Queensland		Part of the World Heritage site Central Eastern Rainforest Reserves. Rainforest and eucalypt forest.
Sydney Turpentine-Ironbark Forest	New South Wales		The main canopy trees are turpentine (Syncarpia glomulifera), grey ironbark (Eucalyptus paniculata), narrow-leaved ironbark (Eucalyptus crebra) and red ironbark. Very few remnants of Sydney Turpentine-Ironbark Forest remain.
Tarkine	Tasmania		Extensive stands of eucalypt forest and cool temperate rainforest that includes ancient myrtle beech trees. Conservationists have intermittently blockaded logging in the forest since the mid-1990s.
Tarra-Bulga National Park	Victoria		Remnant cool temperate rainforest in the Stzelecki Ranges. The deeply incised river valleys of the park are dominated by wet sclerophyll tall open forest of mountain ash (Eucalyptus regnans), with an understorey of blackwood (Acacia melanoxylon), hazel pomaderris (Pomaderris aspera) and tree ferns (Dicksonia antarctica and Cyathea australis). Pockets of the park feature cool temperate rainforest, including myrtle beech (Nothofagus cunninghamii).
Tuart Forest National Park	Western Australia		Contains rare old growth Tuart (Eucalyptus gomphocephala) forest.
Walpole-Nornalup National Park	Western Australia		Contains rare old growth giant Tingle eucalypt forest known as "The Valley of the Giants".
Wielangta forest	Tasmania		Part of remnant glacial refugia forest and contains blue gum eucalypt forest and pockets of cool temperate rainforest. The forest is a key habitat of rare and threatened species, including the Tasmanian wedge-tailed eagle, swift parrot, broad-toothed stag beetle, spotted-tail quoll and eastern barred bandicoot. A rare orchid (Corunastylis nuda) has also been discovered in the forest.
Wollemi National Park	New South Wales		Contains the only known wild specimens of the Wollemi pine (Wollemia nobilis), a species thought to have become extinct approximately thirty million years ago, but discovered alive in three small stands in 1994.

== Bushfires ==
Over the years, bushfires have destroyed a lot of trees and this in turn destroyed the habitat of many animals; most notably koalas numbers have decreased nearly 30% across Australia since 2018.

== Gallery ==
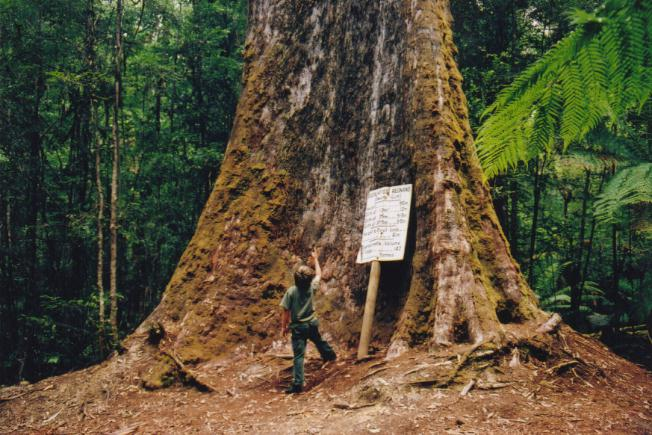
Child standing under 92 metre mountain ash tree in Tasmania's Styx Valley

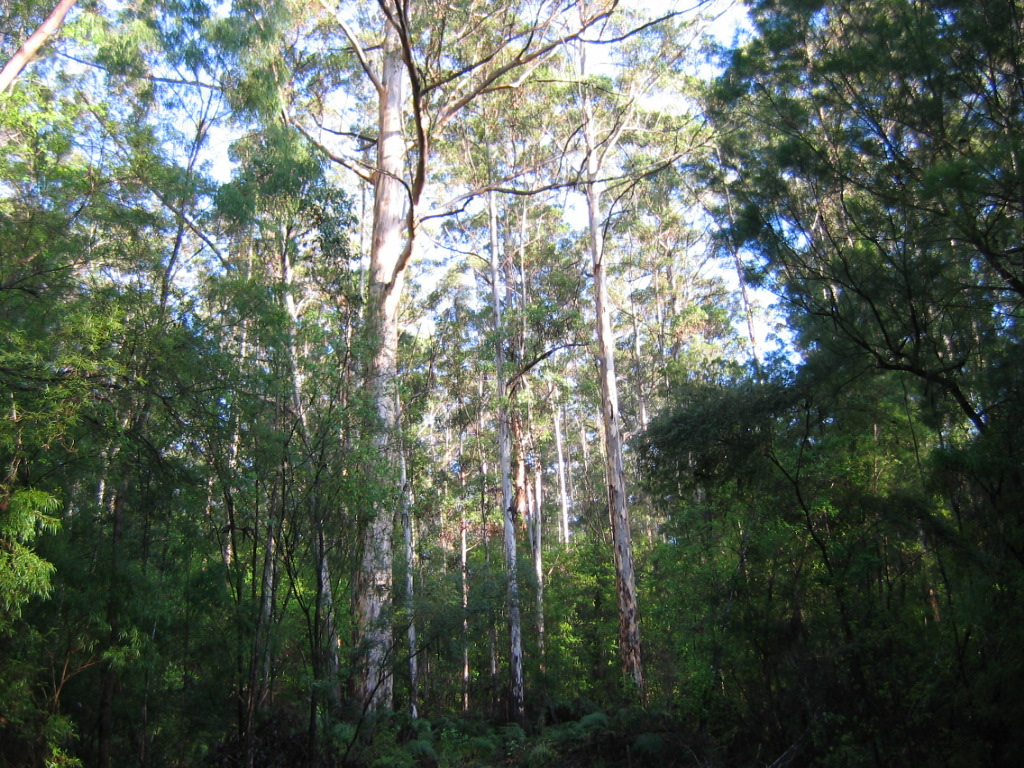
Karri forest near Cascades at Pemberton, Western Australia

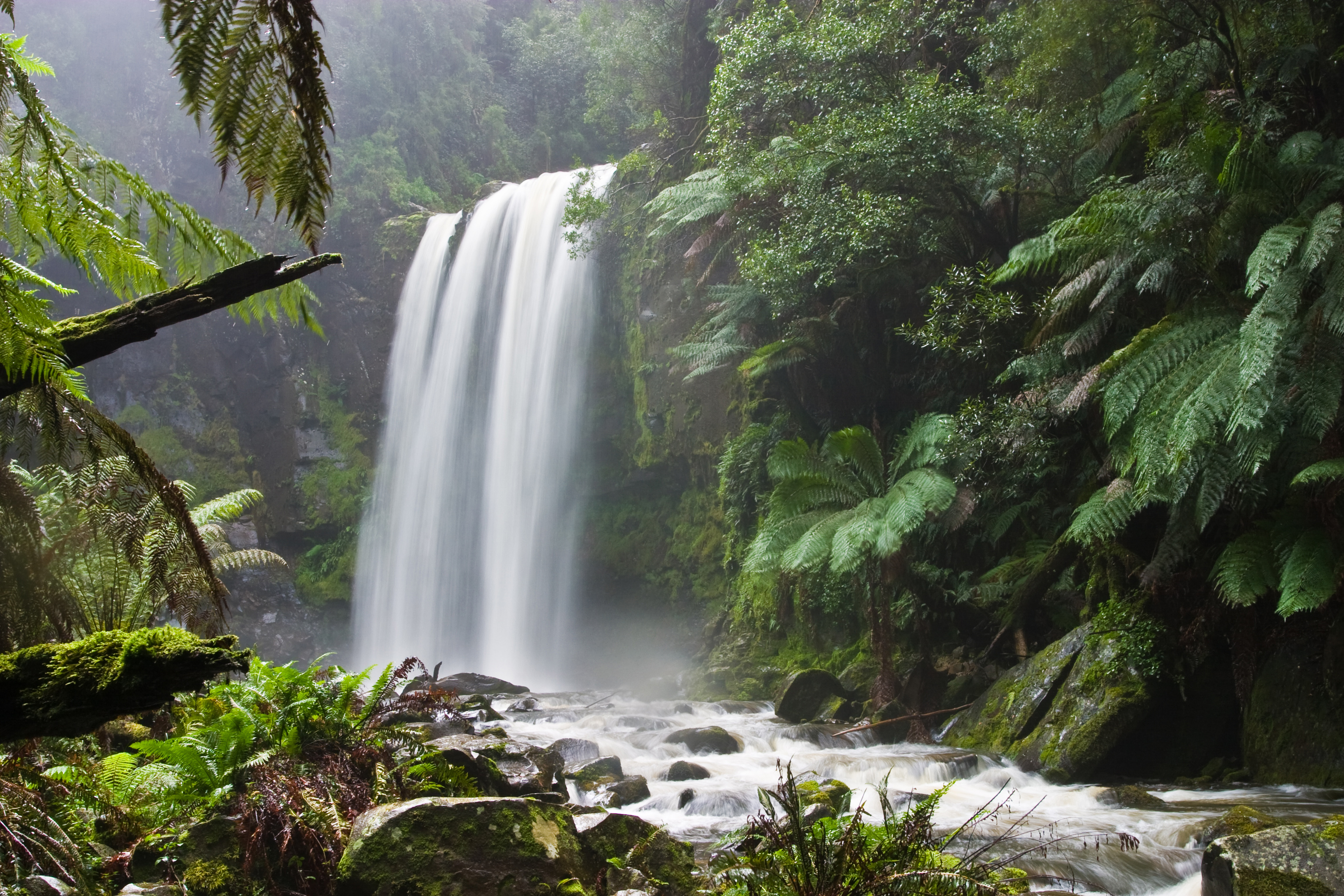
Hopetoun Falls, beech forest, near Great Otway National Park, Victoria.

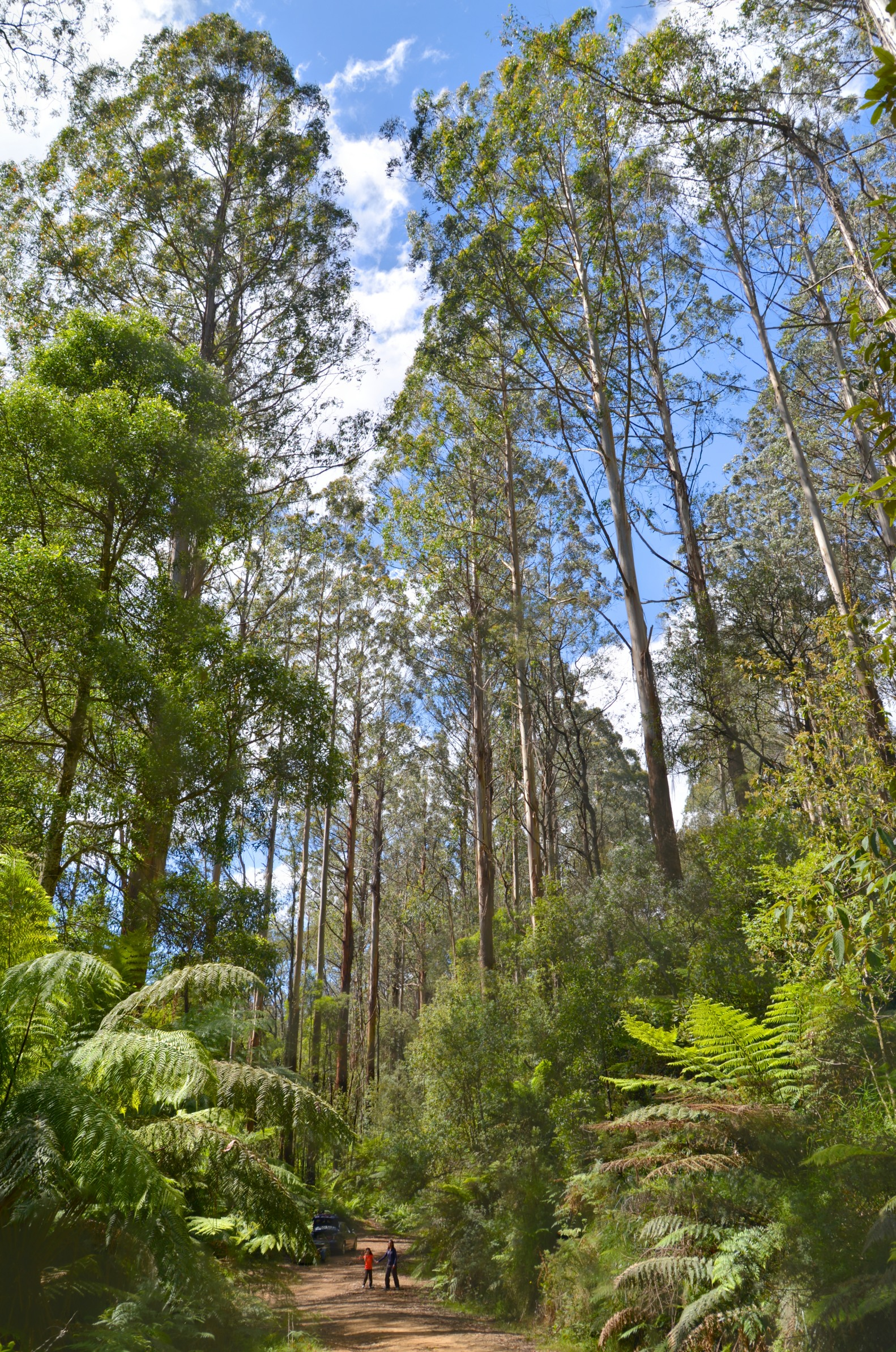
Toolangi State Forest near the Little Red Toolangi Treehouse

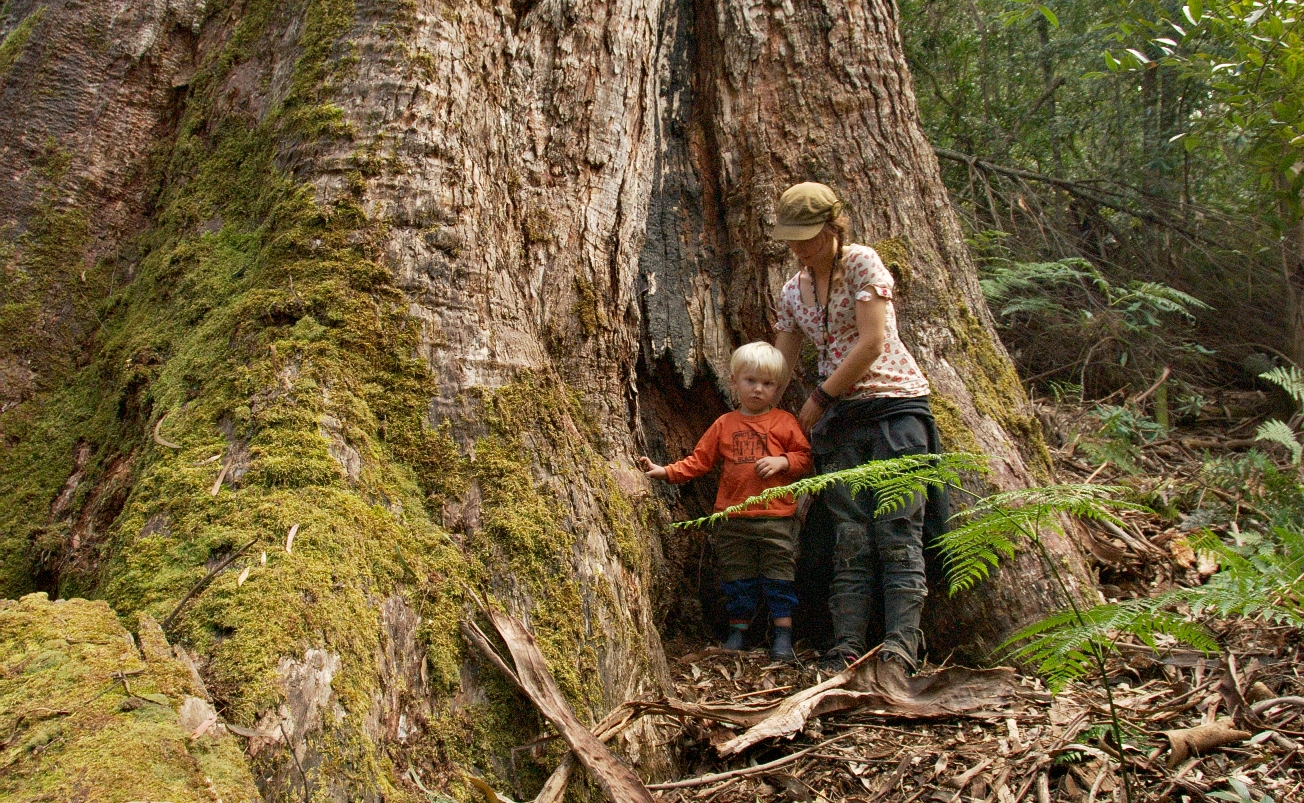
Old growth forest, near Errinundra National Park.

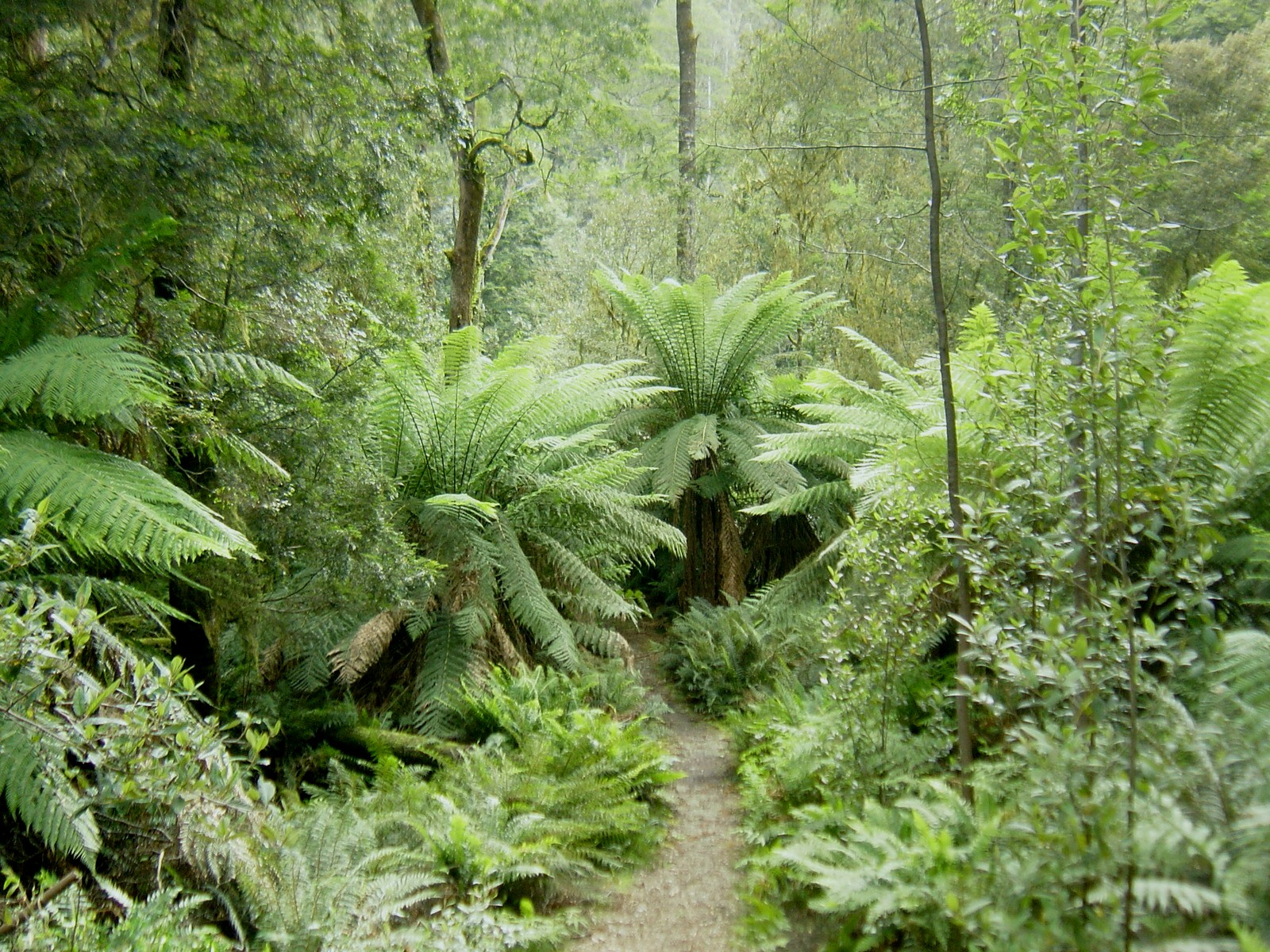
Rainforest in Tasmania's Hellyer Gorge is considered a Gondwanan relic.

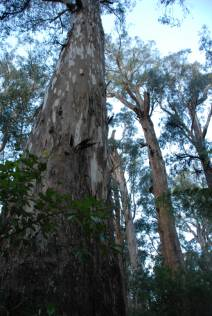
Brown Mountain old growth mountain ash

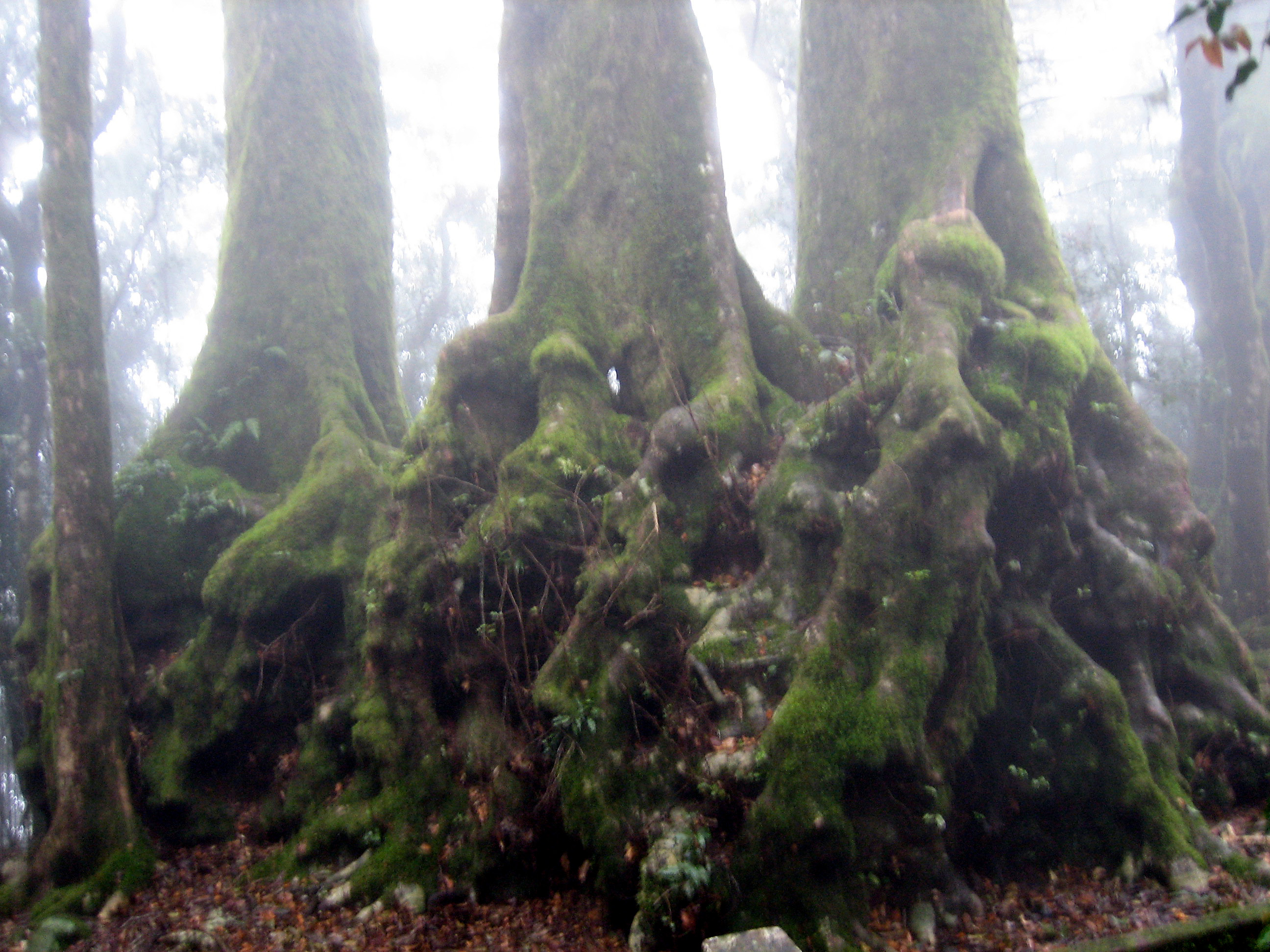
The buttressed roots of an Antarctic beech in Lamington National Park

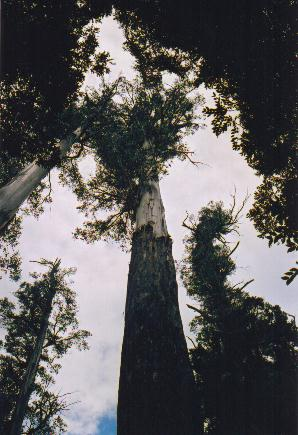
Tasmania's "Big Tree" is one of the tallest remaining mountain ash.

== See also ==
- Deforestation in Australia
- List of old-growth forests in Australia
- National Reserve System
- Protected areas of Australia
- Forestry in Tasmania
- Woodchipping in Australia
- Temperate and subtropical rainforests of New South Wales
