= Brodribb River =

River in Victoria, Australia

Brodribb
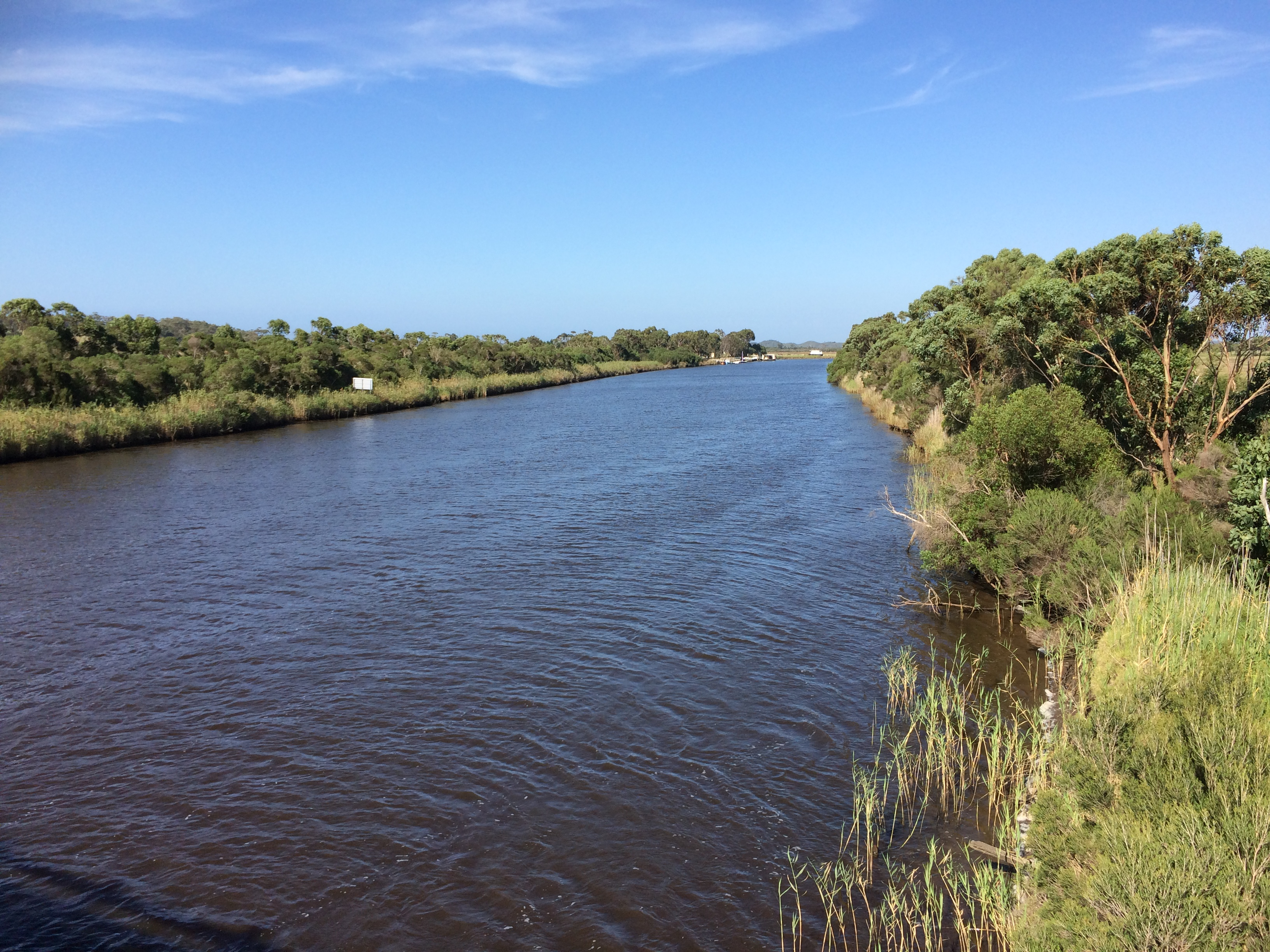
- Brodribb River, Marlo from Bridge

- Mouth of the Brodribb River in Victoria
- Etymology: In honour of William Adams Brodribb.

Location
- Country: Australia
- State: Victoria
- Region: South East Corner (IBRA), East Gippsland
- Local government area: Shire of East Gippsland

Physical characteristics
- Source: Errinundra Plateau
  - location: Errinundra National Park
  - elevation: 334 m (1,096 ft)
- Source confluence: South Branch and North Branch of the Brodribb River
- Mouth: confluence with the Snowy River
  - location: Lake Corringle-Lake Wat Wat Wildlife Reserve
  - coordinates: 37°46′45″S 148°30′52″E
  - elevation: 41 m (135 ft)
- Length: 105 km (65 mi)

Basin features
- River system: Snowy River catchment
- Tributaries
  - left: Ellery Creek, B A Creek, Ferntree Creek, Big River, Rich River, Tooti Creek, Jack River, Cabbage Tree Creek
  - right: Goongerah Creek, Joy Creek, Dead Bull Creek, Dead Calf Creek, Ironbark Creek, Martin Creek (Victoria), Sardine Creek, Wild Cow Creek, Dynamite Creek, Gravelly Creek, Camp Creek (Victoria)
- National park: Errinundra NP

The Brodribb River is a perennial river of the Snowy River catchment, in the East Gippsland region of the Australian state of Victoria.

== Course and features ==
Formed by the confluence of the South Branch and the North Branch of the river, the Brodribb River rises below the Errinundra Plateau within the Errinundra National Park east of the locality of Goongerah. The river flows generally south by west by south, joined by the Big, Rich, and Jack rivers and sixteen minor tributaries, flowing through a series of reserves and through Lake Curlip, before reaching its confluence with the Snowy River, within the Lake Corringle-Lake Wat Wat Wildlife Reserve in the Shire of East Gippsland. The river descends 337 metres (1,106 ft) over its 105-kilometre (65 mi) course.

An area of 17 square kilometres (6.6 sq mi) of wetlands along the lower reaches of the river has been identified by BirdLife International as an Important Bird Area (IBA) because it supports a small breeding population of the endangered Australasian bittern.

In its upper reaches, the river is traversed on multiple occasions by the Bonang Highway. In its lower reaches, the river is traversed by the Princess Highway, east of Orbost; and the Marlo Road, north of Marlo.

The catchment area of the river is administered by the East Gippsland Catchment Management Authority.

== Aboriginal massacre ==
At some time in 1850, 15 to 20 Gunai people were killed on the banks of the Brodribb River, a few miles south east of Orbost. The killing was reported to have been revenge for the murder of station cook Dan Dempsey, for lacing a gift of flour to local Gunai people with arsenic. The Aboriginal police were believed to have been involved in the massacre.

== Etymology ==
The river was named in honour of William Adams Brodribb, an early settler.

== See also ==
- List of rivers of Australia
- Gippsland massacres
