= Combienbar River =

Combienbar Coombienbar
- Mouth of the Combienbar River in Victoria

Location
- Country: Australia
- State: Victoria
- Region: South East Corner (IBRA), East Gippsland
- Local government area: Shire of East Gippsland

Physical characteristics
- Source: Three Sisters (Victoria)
  - location: east of Errinundra National Park
  - elevation: 853 m (2,799 ft)
- Mouth: confluence with the Errinundra River to form the Bemm River
  - location: near Boulder Flat
  - coordinates: 37°28′34″S 148°55′39″E
  - elevation: 129 m (423 ft)
- Length: 33 km (21 mi)

Basin features
- River system: Bemm River catchment
- Tributaries
  - left: Tiger Snake Creek, Swamp Creek, Stagg Creek
  - right: Cataract Creek, Fourteen Mile Creek, Hensleigh Creek, Cobon Creek, Bungywarr Creek, Bola Creek

The Combienbar River is a perennial river of the Bemm River catchment, in the East Gippsland region of the Australian state of Victoria.

== Course and features ==
Combienbar River rises below the Three Sisters, in a remote state forestry area east of the Errinundra National Park, and flows generally north by west, then south, then south by west, joined by eight minor tributaries, before reaching its confluence with the Errinundra River to form the Bemm River, near Boulder Flat, northwest of the town of Cann River in the Shire of East Gippsland. The river descends 720 metres (2,360 ft) over its 33-kilometre (21 mi) course.

The Combienbar River sub-catchment area is managed by the East Gippsland Catchment Management Authority.

== See also ==
- List of rivers of Australia
