= McKenzie River (Victoria) =

River in Victoria, Australia

McKenzie
- Mouth of the McKenzie River in Victoria

Location
- Country: Australia
- State: Victoria
- Region: South East Corner (IBRA), East Gippsland
- Local government area: Shire of East Gippsland

Physical characteristics
- Source: Jungle Hill, Errinundra Plateau
  - location: Errinundra National Park
  - elevation: 349 m (1,145 ft)
- Mouth: confluence with the Bemm River
  - location: near Bellbird Creek
  - coordinates: 37°37′55″S 148°53′13″E
  - elevation: 75 m (246 ft)
- Length: 15 km (9.3 mi)

Basin features
- River system: Bemm River catchment
- Tributaries
  - right: Watchmaker Gully, Pheasant Creek (Victoria)
- National park: Errinundra NP

The McKenzie River is a perennial river of the Bemm River catchment, in the East Gippsland region of the Australian state of Victoria.

== Course and features ==
McKenzie River rises below Jungle Hill, part of the Errinundra Plateau, in remote country in the Errinundra National Park, and flows generally south by east, joined by two minor tributaries, before reaching its confluence with the Bemm River, near Bellbird Creek, west of the town of Cann River in the Shire of East Gippsland. The river descends 274 metres (899 ft) over its 15-kilometre (9.3 mi) course.

The McKenzie River sub-catchment area is managed by the East Gippsland Catchment Management Authority.

The river is traversed by the Princes Highway between Orbost and Cann River.

== See also ==
- List of rivers of Australia
