= East Gippsland Water =

Water corporation in Victoria, Australia

- East Gippsland Water logo

Agency overview
- Formed: 1 July 2007
- Preceding agency: East Gippsland Region Water Authority
- Jurisdiction: Government of Victoria
- Headquarters: Bairnsdale, Victoria, Australia
- Minister responsible: Gayle Tierney, Minister for Water (Victoria)
- Agency executives: Therese Tierney, Chair of the Board; Michael Wandmaker, Managing Director
- Parent department: Department of Energy, Environment and Climate Action
- Website: www.egwater.vic.gov.au

East Gippsland Water (EGW) is a water services corporation in the eastern region of Gippsland, Victoria in Australia. It is owned by the Victorian Government and was formed as a corporation on 1 July 2007. EGW has a service area of 21,000 km^{2} (8,100 sq mi) in East Gippsland in the far south east of Victoria. The population within the service area is around 49,000 people.

East Gippsland Water is classified as an urban water corporation and manages drinking water, recycled water and wastewater in the service area. It has its headquarters in Bairnsdale. The service area includes Bairnsdale and Lindenow in the west, Paynesville and Lakes Entrance, and extends to the Wilderness Coast and Mallacoota near the New South Wales border. EGW provides water services as far north as the town of Dinner Plain on the Great Alpine Road in the Victorian Alps.

In a 2019 customer satisfaction survey of Victorian water utilities conducted by the Essential Services Commission, East Gippsland Water scored highest for value-for-money, and highly across other measures.

In July 2022, EGW was fined for discharging over 30 megalitres of wastewater from its Bairnsdale Wastewater Treatment Plant into the Macleod Morass, following wet weather. In April 2023 EGW was fined for discharging wastewater from its Newmerella wastewater treatment plant, and failing to comply with a regulatory notice from the Environmental Protection Authority (Victoria). In November 2023, EGW was ordered to pay $50,000 to a restoration project run by the East Gippsland Catchment Management Authority, and pay other costs, following the discharge of 138 megalitres of wastewater from its Paynesville water recycling plant. A further fine of almost $10,000 was imposed in March 2025, following the release of three megalitres of treated wastewater at Eagle Point.

East Gippsland Water is subject to price control regulation administered by the Essential Services Commission. In September 2022, the company submitted its pricing proposal for the period 1 July 2023 to 30 June 2028. In June 2023, the Essential Services Commission approved new prices for customers over the 5-year period from 1 July 2023 to 30 June 2028.

In 2024, the Victorian Treasurer agreed to increase the borrowing limit imposed on EGW from $3 million to $5 million to enable urgent work on the Paynesville water recycling plant. Investment was needed to achieve environmental compliance and address concerns with performance. Work on the Paynesville upgrade project commenced in February 2025, with the aim of tripling the water storage capacity and lowering the risk of discharges during extended wet periods.
