= 2006 in the environment =

This is a list of notable events relating to the environment in 2006. They relate to environmental law, conservation, environmentalism and environmental issues.

== Events ==
- The Southeast Asian haze, caused by continued uncontrolled burning from "slash and burn" cultivation in Indonesia, affected several countries in the Southeast Asian region and beyond, such as Malaysia, Singapore, southern Thailand, and as far as Saipan; the effects of the haze may have spread to South Korea.
- The Biodiversity Indicators Partnership is established.
- Colony collapse disorder became apparent in the North American bee population.
- International Year of Deserts and Desertification

=== January ===
- American aerospace company Boeing agreed to a $30 million settlement to end an eight-year lawsuit alleging that nuclear and rocket engine tests at the Santa Susana Field Lab caused cancer and other illnesses in 133 plaintiffs.
- Three companies in the Inner Mongolia region of China agree to pay $285,100 for polluting the Yellow River in 2004. It is the first lawsuit seeking compensation for Yellow River pollution.

=== February ===
- The government of New South Wales, Australia bans commercial fishing activities in Sydney Harbor due to high dioxin levels found in prawns and bream.

=== March ===
- The Merchant Shipping (Pollution) Act 2006 is given royal assent in the United Kingdom.
- The Prudhoe Bay oil spill occurred on a pipeline in western Prudhoe Bay, Alaska. Initial estimates said that up to 267,000 US gallons (6,400 bbl) were spilled over 1.9 acres (7,700 m^{2}), making it the largest oil spill on Alaska's north slope to date.
- The Conference of Parties (COP) 8 of the Convention on Biological Diversity (CBD) meets in Curitiba, Brazil and covered framework for monitoring implementation of the Biodiversity Indicators Partnership (BIP) 2010 targets. The BIP was first adopted by governments at the COP 6 in 2002.

=== April ===
- Construction of the Saemangeum Seawall is completed. It is located on the south-west coast of the Korean peninsula, and is the world's longest human-made dyke, measuring 33 kilometres. It runs between two headlands, and separates the Yellow Sea and the former Saemangeum estuary. From the moment it was announced environmental groups protested against the impact of the dyke on the local environment.
- Cambodia ratifies the ASEAN Agreement on Transboundary Haze Pollution, caused by continued uncontrolled burning from "slash and burn" cultivation in Indonesia. The haze affected several countries in the Southeast Asian region and beyond, such as Malaysia, Singapore, southern Thailand, and as far as Saipan; the effects of the haze may have spread to South Korea.

=== May ===
- The Zakouma elephant slaughter was a series of poaching massacres of African elephants in the vicinity of Zakouma National Park in southeastern Chad. These killings were documented in aerial surveys conducted from May through August 2006 and total at least 100 animals.
- An Inconvenient Truth, a documentary film about climate change and global warming, premiered at the Sundance Film Festival. It has been credited for raising international public awareness of climate change and re-energising the environmental movement. Al Gore jointly wins a Nobel Peace Prize for his work on the film and climate efforts in 2007.
- The BBC airs Are We Changing Planet Earth?, the first of a two-part documentary series about global warming narrated by British broadcaster and naturalist Sir David Attenborough.

=== June ===
- The Climate Change and Sustainable Energy Act 2006, an Act of the Parliament of the United Kingdom, is given royal assent. It aims to boost the number of heat and electricity microgeneration installations in the United Kingdom, so helping to cut carbon emissions and reduce fuel poverty.
- An International Whaling Commission meeting was held in St Kitts and Nevis.
- The Presbyterian Church (U.S.A.) Carbon Neutral Resolution passed.

=== July ===
- The Jiyeh Power Station oil spill occurred with the release of heavy fuel oil into the eastern Mediterranean after storage tanks at the thermal power station in Jiyeh, Lebanon, 30 km (19 mi) south of Beirut, were bombed by the Israeli Air force during the 2006 Israel-Lebanon conflict.

=== August ===
- The Côte d'Ivoire toxic waste dumping crisis occurred. It involved a local contracting company hired to dispose of post-cleaning waste products from a ship registered in Panama, the Probo Koala, at the port of Abidjan. The contractor's improper disposal of the waste prompted a health scare. The ship was chartered by the Dutch-based oil and commodity shipping company Trafigura Beheer BV.
- The Guimaras oil spill occurred in the Guimaras Strait off the cost of the Philippines. It is the worst oil spill ever in the Philippines, pouring 130,000 gallons of oil into Panay Gulf.
- The Framework Convention for the Protection of the Marine Environment of the Caspian Sea enters into force.

=== September ===
- Steve Irwin, an Australian environmentalist and television personality, dies as a result of an injury due to a stingray barb while carrying out underwater filming on the Great Barrier Reef.

=== October ===
- The Stern Review on the Economics of Climate Change is released for the British government by economist Nicholas Stern. The report discusses the effect of global warming on the world economy. Although not the first economic report on climate change, it is significant as the largest and most widely known and discussed report of its kind.

=== November ===
- The Yangtze Freshwater Dolphin Expedition 2006 begins to search for the baiji, which is now considered to be extinct.
- Livestock's Long Shadow - Environmental Issues and Options report is released by the Food and Agriculture Organization of the United Nations. The report states that the livestock sector is one of the top two or three most significant contributors to the most serious environmental problems, at every scale from local to global.
- The Australian Labor Party in Victoria wins elections based on protecting Goolengook as a preserve.

=== December ===
- A tree sit as part of the Berkeley oak grove controversy began in the United States.

== See also ==
- Human impact on the environment
- List of years in the environment
