= Hibbertia torulosa =

Yundi guinea-flower

Scientific classification
- Kingdom: Plantae
- Clade: Tracheophytes
- Clade: Angiosperms
- Clade: Eudicots
- Order: Dilleniales
- Family: Dilleniaceae
- Genus: Hibbertia
- Species: H. torulosa

Binomial name
- Hibbertia torulosa Toelken

Species of flowering plant

Hibbertia torulosa is a species of flowering plant in the family Dilleniaceae and is endemic to a restricted area of Victoria, Australia. It is a shrublet with hairy foliage, linear leaves and yellow flowers with six stamens on one side of two hairy carpels.

== Description ==
Hibbertia torulosa is a shrublet that typically grows to a height of up to 60 cm (24 in) and has knobby branches and foliage covered with star-shaped hairs. The leaves are linear, mostly 1.9–4.3 mm (0.075–0.169 in) long and 0.7–1.2 mm (0.028–0.047 in) wide on a petiole up to 0.25 mm (0.0098 in) long. The flowers are arranged mostly on the ends of short shoots with linear bracts 0.8–1.3 mm (0.031–0.051 in) long at the base. The five sepals are 4.3–5.4 mm (0.17–0.21 in) long and joined at the base, the outer lobes lance-shaped and the inner lobes egg-shaped. The petals are yellow, egg-shaped with the narrower end towards the base, 4.8–6.2 mm (0.19–0.24 in) long with six stamens fused at the base on one side of two hairy carpels. When grown in cultivation, flowers are present in most months.

== Taxonomy ==
Hibbertia torulosa was first formally described in 1995 by Hellmut R. Toelken and Robert John Bates in the Journal of the Adelaide Botanic Gardens from specimens collected near the Bemm River in 1994. The specific epithet (torulosa) means "knobby", referring to the branchlets.

== Distribution and habitat ==
This hibbertia is only known from the type collection in woodland near the Bemm River in Victoria.

== See also ==
- List of Hibbertia species
