= Integrated catchment management =

Environmental planning

Integrated catchment management (ICM) is a subset of environmental planning which approaches sustainable resource management from a catchment perspective, in contrast to a piecemeal approach that artificially separates land management from water management.

== Details ==
Integrated catchment management recognizes the existence of ecosystems and their role in supporting flora and fauna, providing services to human societies, and regulating the human environment. Integrated catchment management seeks to take into account complex relationships within those ecosystems: between flora and fauna, between geology, between soils and the biosphere, and between the biosphere and the atmosphere. Integrated catchment management recognizes the cyclic nature of processes within an ecosystem, and values scientific and technical information for understanding and analysing the natural world.

== See also ==
- Catchment Management Authority (New South Wales)
- Catchment Management Authority (Victoria)
- Motueka River
- List of drainage basins by area
