= Saint Patrick River =

Coordinates: 12°13′N 61°38′W

Location
- Country: Grenada

Not to be confused with Saint Patricks River in Australia

Mt. Rich estate map including a section of the river

The Saint Patrick River is a river of Grenada.

It passes through Snell Hall, Elie Hall, and Mt. Rich. Mt. Rich Petroglyphs are by it.

== See also ==
- List of rivers of Grenada
