= Mount Ellery =

Mountain in Victoria, Australia

Mount Ellery (Barumpa)
- Location within Victoria

Highest point
- Elevation: 1,280 m (4,200 ft)
- Coordinates: 37°23′36″S 148°46′41″E

Geography
- Location: Mount Ellery in Victoria, Australia
- Parent range: Errinundra Plateau

Mount Ellery (Gunai: Barumpa), with an elevation of 1,280 metres (4,200 ft) AMSL, is a mountain that is part of the Errinundra Plateau within the Errinundra National Park, located in the East Gippsland region of the Australian state of Victoria. The mountain is approximately 11 kilometres (6.8 mi) south of the hamlet of Goongerah.

Mount Ellery is the summit end-point for the proposed Sea to Summit walk in East Gippsland.
