= Mt. Rich Petroglyphs =

Rock art in Grenada

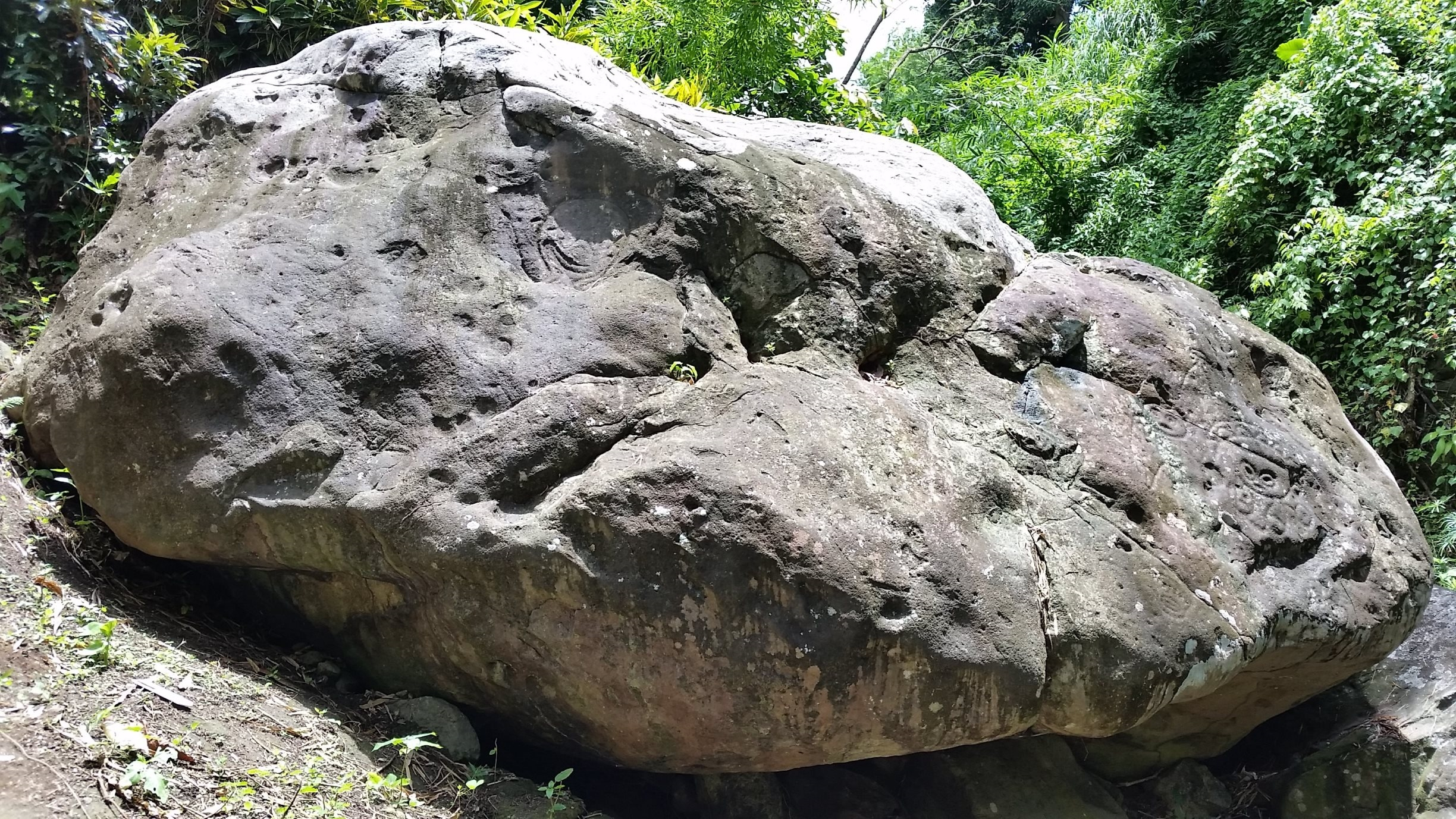
- Main stone at the Mt. Rich Petroglyphs

- Location within Grenada
- 12°11′36.28″N 61°38′34.47″W
- Type: Petroglyph
- Periods: Late Ceramic Age/Troumassoid Period (AD 700-1500)
- Cultures: Indigenous peoples of the Caribbean
- Location: Mt. Rich, St. Patrick Parish, Grenada

Site notes
- Owner: Mixed public and private
- Public access: Yes
- Website: http://www.mycedo.org

The Mt. Rich Petroglyphs are a series of pre-Columbian petroglyphs, set deep in a ravine along the Saint Patrick River in Mt. Rich, Grenada. The site consists of several boulders carved by ancient Amerindians, the largest of which contains over 60 engravings. Two "workstones" can also be found nearby, comprising six cupules.

== History ==
Given the diversity and sheer number of images (which may be well over 60), some researchers have hypothesized they represent a palimpsest of drawings carved at different times. For instance, a study of the design elements in the Mt. Rich petroglyphs, as compared to others in the Lesser Antilles, found that the earliest images at Mt. Rich may have been carved as early as AD 500. However, ceramic data from a nearby archaeological site (Montreuil) suggests they were carved slightly later, no earlier than AD 700, which is further supported by a radiocarbon dating. Other proxy evidence correlating a period of climatic aridity with population movements in South America and the southern Caribbean suggest most (if not all) of Grenada's rock art and workstones date between AD 750–900.

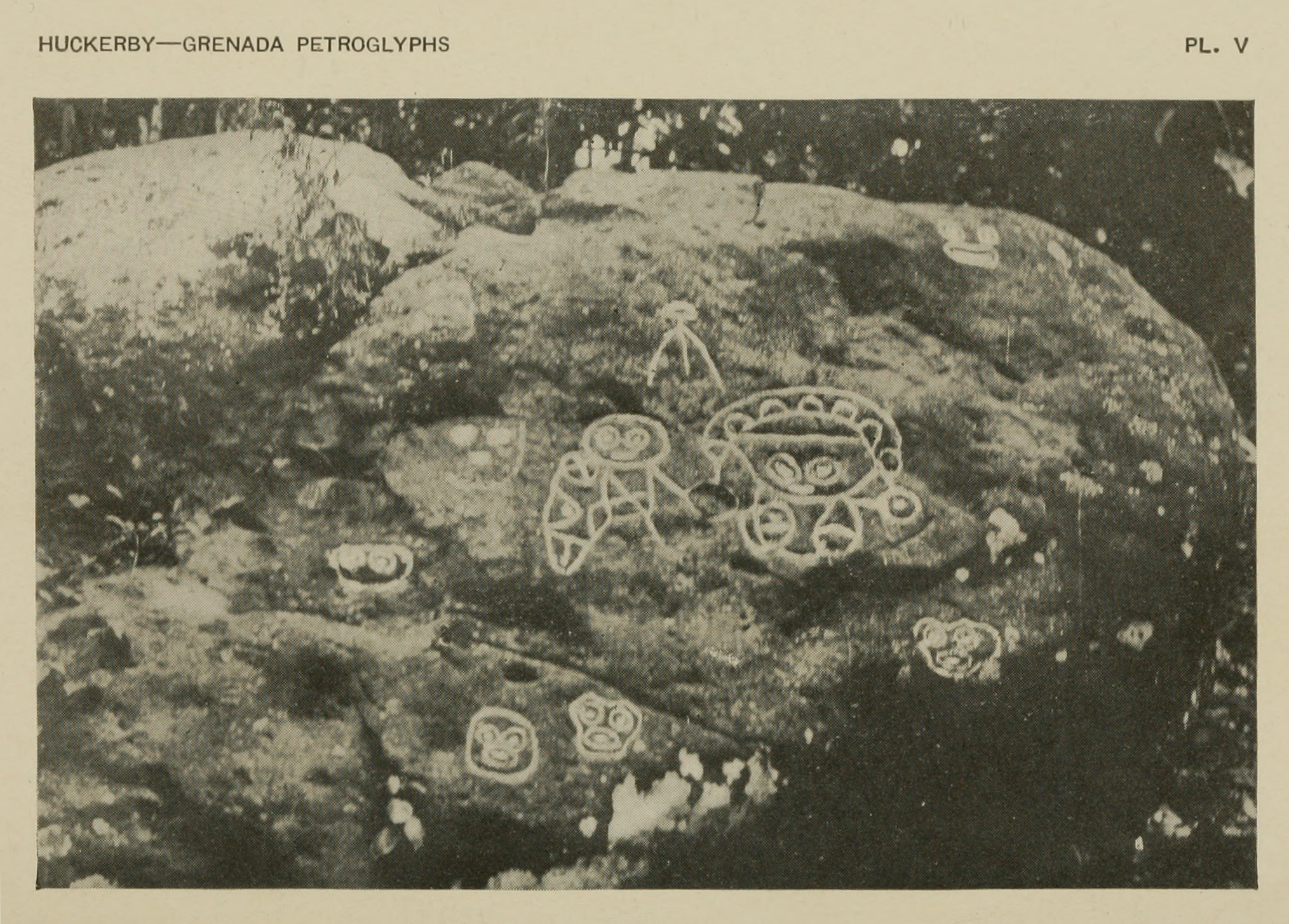
A Photo of the main stone, from Huckerby's 1921 book

The earliest historical reference to the Mt. Rich stones is a brief note dated 1833 in the Grenada Magazine, which describes "several hieroglyphical characters" carved on a stone below the Mount Rich sugar‐works. In February 1903, German geologist Karl Sapper visited several of Grenada's petroglyph sites with Rev. Thomas Huckerby, drawing a few of the images of Mt. Rich in his book on St. Vincent. In 1921, Thomas Huckerby, the Methodist minister who had hosted Sapper and previously written an article on St. Vincent's petroglyphs, published a small booklet about Grenada's petroglyphs through the Museum of the American Indian in New York (now part of the Smithsonian). The 1921 report contains photographs and discussion of the glyphs at Mt. Rich and two other sites near Victoria, Grenada. Since Huckerby's visit, several researchers have mentioned the site in their reports.

In 1986, Archaeologists Ann Cody recorded Mt. Rich in an inventory of the island's prehistoric sites. They observed that Huckerby's photographs did not match the current position of the main stone, leading them to hypothesize that the rock had rolled down the hill after Huckerby's visit. Others have since noted that, given its association with the other petroglyphs and workstones in the river, the main stone likely just moved slightly out of position since 1921, perhaps a result of people standing on top. Indeed, the 1833 article describes the stone as situated below the Mt. Rich sugar estate, indicating it was probably always in the ravine.

== Interpretation ==
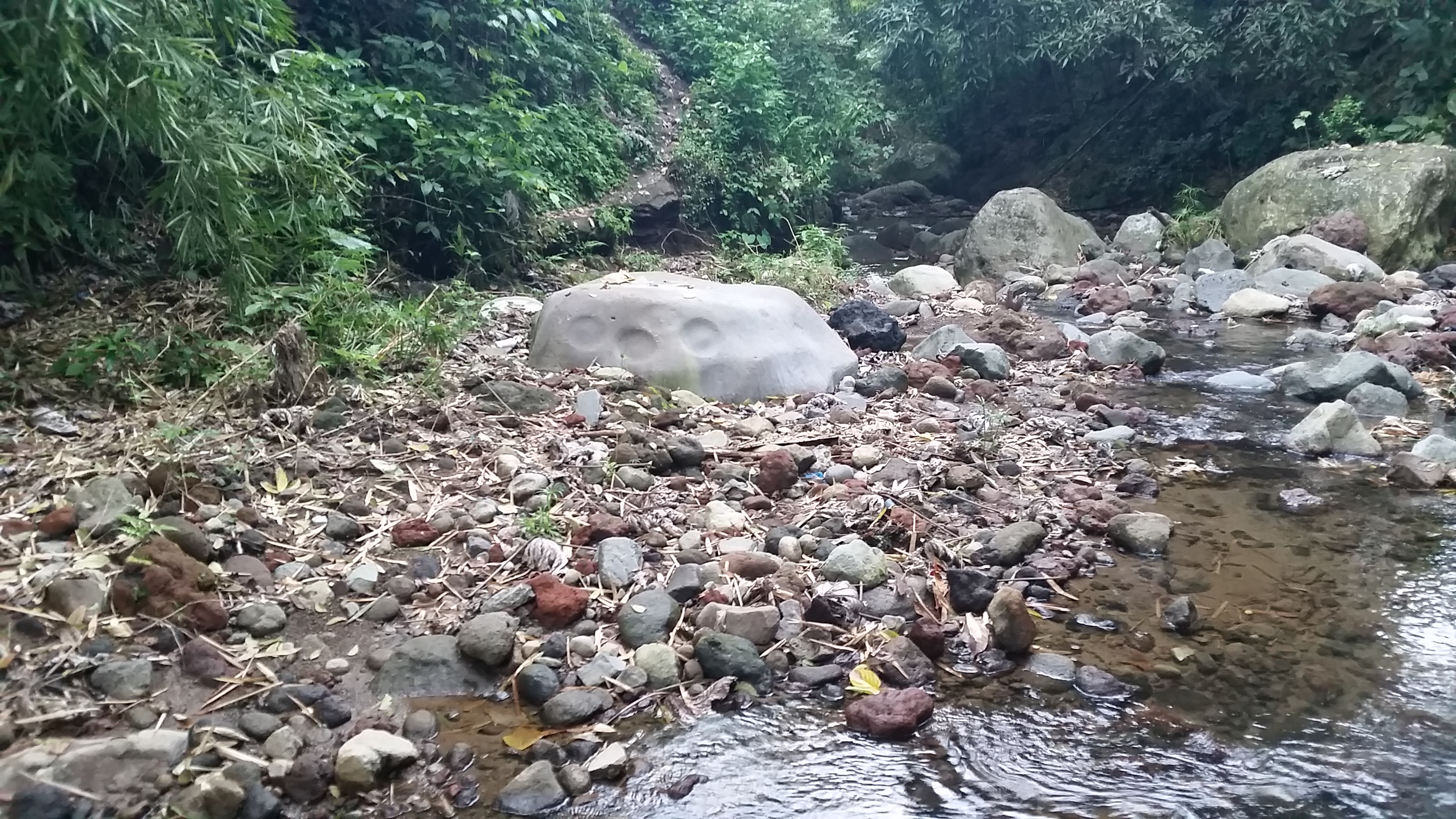
One of the workstones at the Mt. Rich Petroglyphs

While the original meaning of the Mt. Rich engravings can only be speculated, archaeologists have made several observations about rock art in the Caribbean, generally:

1. they always occur near water;
2. there are often "workstones" nearby;
3. some images occur on ceramics, but most do not;
4. there are three general categories: simple faces, elaborate faces, and geometric patterns;
5. the elaborate faces often have zoomorphic (animal-like) features.

Most Caribbean archaeologists hold that petroglyphs were drawn by shamans, perhaps to denote places where ancestors would gather. Like much of the New World, Amerindian groups in the Caribbean were animists, and sought to communicate with their ancestors. If petroglyphs are ritual spaces, then the accompanying workstones may be mortars upon which the shamans mixed hallucinogenic concoctions to connect with the ancestors before carving (or re-carving).

== Visiting ==
In 2014, a local youth group (MYCEDO) received a grant to renovate an old lookout building and turn Mt. Rich into a heritage attraction. In 2018, they opened the building to visitors, offering information and a viewing platform for a small fee. The group also conducts tours of their village and the abandoned plantation estates nearby. The Mt. Rich Petroglyphs are also part of the Ministry of Tourism's Petroglyph Path tour, which links several of Grenada's rock art sites.

== Official Status ==
Like all of Grenada's prehistoric and historic archaeological sites, there are no clear designations or regulations protecting the Mt. Rich site, despite being consistently recommended for listing on a national register of heritage sites (which has never been formalized). Technically, all these sites are protected under Grenada's National Museum Act of 2017, but this Act has only been partially implemented by the Government of Grenada.

== Related ==
- Indigenous peoples of the Caribbean
- Petroglyph
- Pre-Columbian art
- List of archaeological sites by country
  - Caguana Ceremonial Ball Courts Site
  - Isla de Mona
  - Caicara del Orinoco
  - Corantijn Basin
