= Presbyterian Church (U.S.A.) Carbon Neutral Resolution =

The Presbyterian Church (USA) Carbon Neutral Resolution was a resolution passed at the June, 2006, 217th General Assembly of the Presbyterian Church (USA) strongly urging all Presbyterians to 'immediately aspire to live carbon neutral lives'. It is believed that resolution was the first in the world by a major religious denomination for its followers to become carbon neutral.

The resolution also directed the Advisory Committee on Social Witness Policy to make available detail of how Presbyterians could take to reduce their energy consumption and recognised that 'the Christian mandate to care for creation and the biblical promise of the restoration of right relationships between God, human beings, and the rest of creation impels and inspires Presbyterians to act to reduce [their] energy usage'.

The resolution was based on a report by a task force prepared for the Advisory Committee on Social Witness Policy. After the Advisory Committee voted to postpone consideration of the report until the 2008 General Assembly, two General Assembly Commissioners bypassed the committee and were successful in getting the resolution adopted.

The Church first noted its 'serious concern' over global warming at the 1990 General Assembly, when it warned that 'the global atmospheric warming trend (the greenhouse effect) represents one of the most serious global environmental challenges to the health, security, and stability of human life and natural ecosystems'. Despite this, a survey carried out in 2004 revealed that over half of all Presbyterians had not taken even the 'simplest steps to decrease their energy usage', and that most congregations had not implemented energy conservation programs.

== See also ==
- Avoiding dangerous climate change
- Carbon footprint
- IPCC Fourth Assessment Report, 2007
