= Brown Mountain forest =

Forest in Australia

Brown Mountain
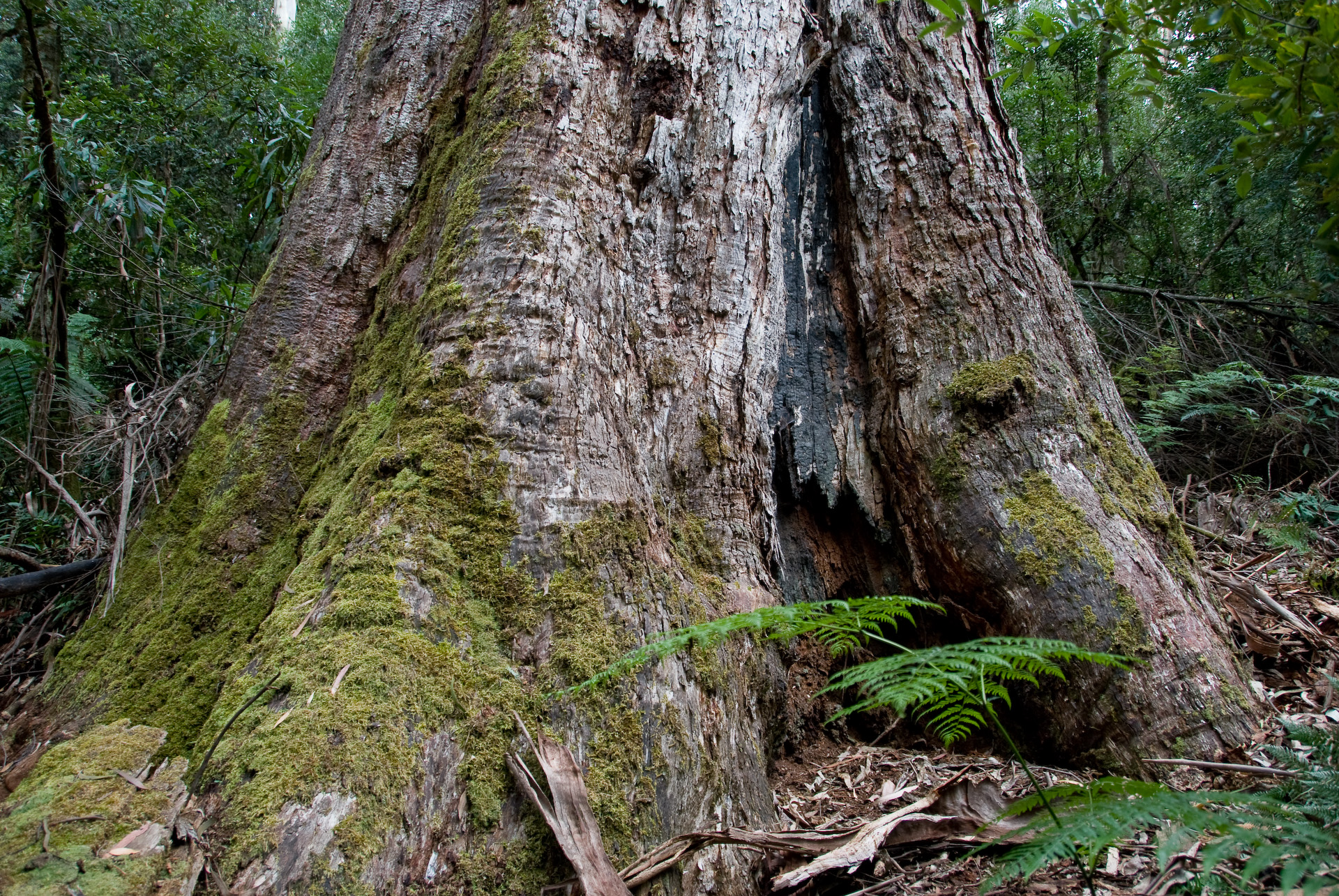
- Old growth forest on Brown Mountain

Highest point
- Elevation: 985 m (3,232 ft)
- Coordinates: 37.26°S 148.74°E

Geography
- Location: Victoria, Australia
- Parent range: Great Dividing Range

Climbing
- First ascent: Unknown
- Easiest route: Legges Road

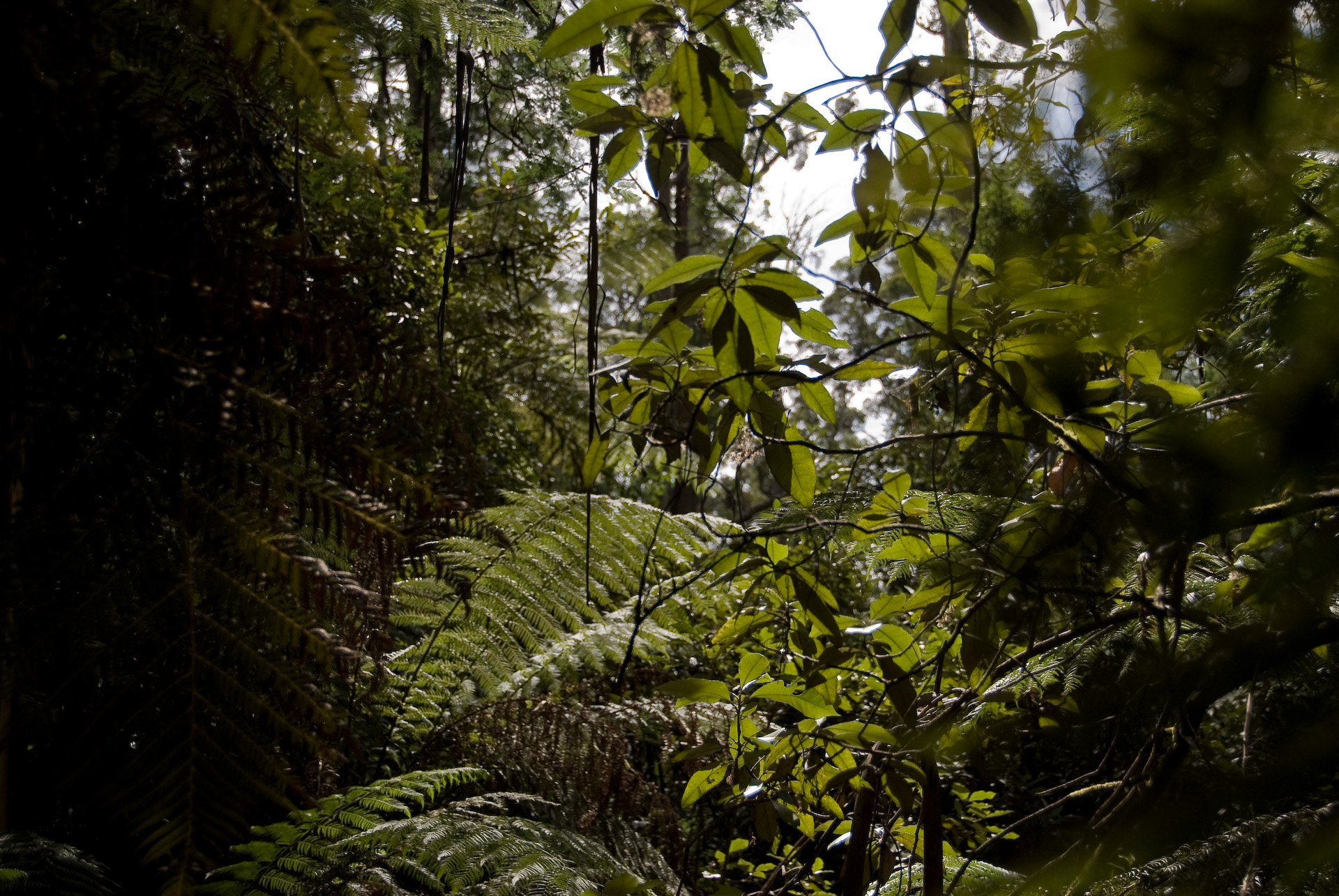
Brown Mountain forest

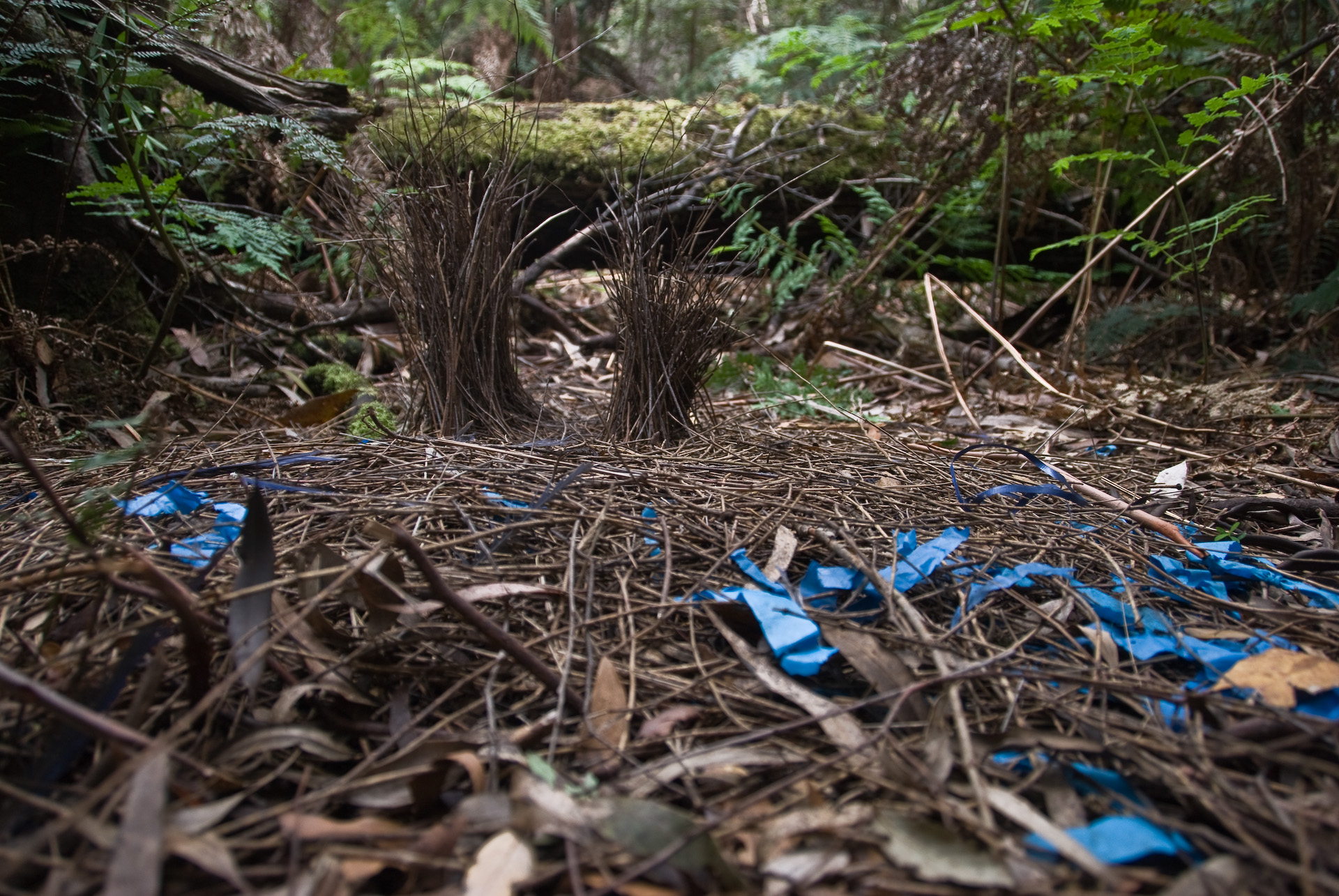
The bower of a bowerbird in Brown Mountain forest

The Brown Mountain forest is located in East Gippsland, Victoria (Australia), and is notable for containing large tracts of old growth forest, including over fifty shining gum trees estimated to be over 300 years old.

== Fauna ==
The eucalypt forest provides key habitat for rare and threatened species such as the powerful owl, the spotted quoll, mainland Australia's largest marsupial carnivore, and the long-footed potoroo. Other animals that inhabit the area include: yellow-bellied glider, southern boobook, mountain brushtail possum, sambar deer (introduced), greater glider and sugar glider.

== Flora and logging activity ==
Trees in Brown Mountain are at least 500 years old, according to a radiocarbon dating carried out by University of Waikato. The test was done on a tree felled in 2009, and is possibly the first test of its kind on an Australian tree. The test results said there was an 84% chance the tree was between 500 and 600 years old. Previously no definitive ages could be placed on the old growth trees of the area. The results may have impacts on the management of the area.

Some parts of Brown Mountain are already protected within the Errinundra National Park, other sections of forest designated as old growth by the Department of Sustainability and Environment between Legges Road and the Errinundra Road are under the control of VicForests, with logging being allowed.

The logging of the forest has been contentious due to the impact on rare and threatened species, the impact on water supplies, the associated carbon emissions. Environmentalists have called for the unprotected Brown Mountain forest area to be incorporated into the National Park reserve system planned to link the Errinundra National Park with the Snowy River National Park.

In 2008, logging recommenced in the Brown Mountain forest, despite Labor Party policy statements during the 2006 Victorian election campaign that they would protect Victoria's last remaining stands of old growth forest available for logging.

Environment Minister Gavin Jennings confirmed that logging the Brown Mountain forest was contentious in his answer to questions in parliament from Greens MP Sue Pennicuik about the logging in progress.

"Is there activity currently being undertaken in East Gippsland that is a source of contention in relation to the appropriateness of it being allocated for harvesting activity and being subject to protest activity?’, I can confirm that that is absolutely happening."

East Gippsland's Eucalyptus nitens forest biomass contains at least 700 (and possibly up to 2000) tonnes carbon per hectare ("green carbon") above ground. Recovery of the carbon debt from clearing intact natural eucalypt forests through afforestation or reforestation takes more than 100 years. Research into the age class structure of Brown Mountain's trees and the forest's carbon capacity is ongoing. 85% of the wood harvested in Victoria's forests is converted to woodchip (mostly for use in paper), sawdust and waste.

A temporary injunction on logging was ordered on September 14, 2009, by Justice Jack Forrest, after the environmental group Environment East Gippsland sued state-owned timber agency VicForests in the Supreme Court, arguing it would be failing its duty to protect native animals if it logged the two remaining coups as planned.

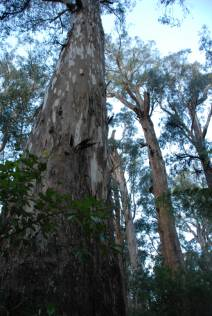
Brown Mountain old growth shining gum

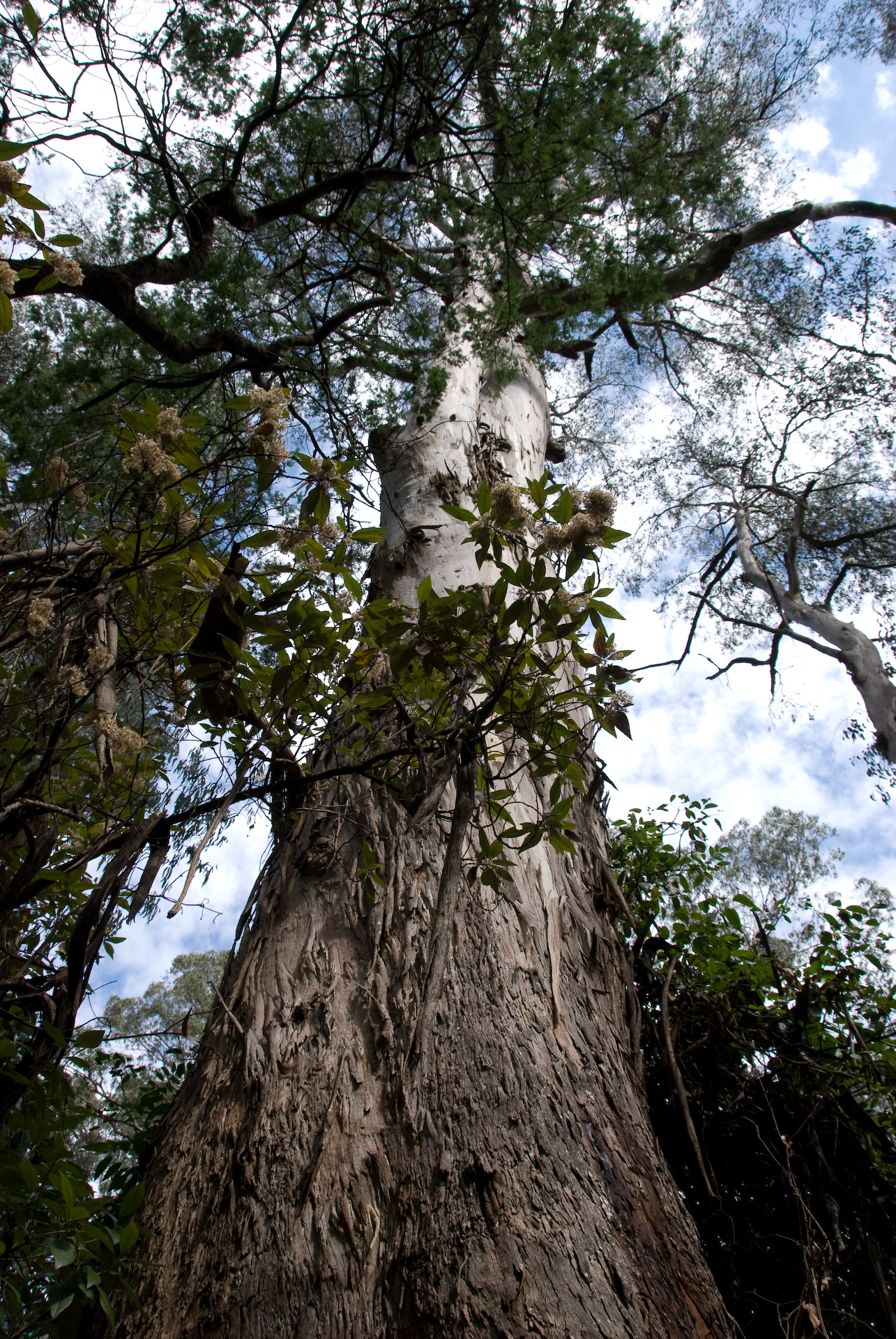

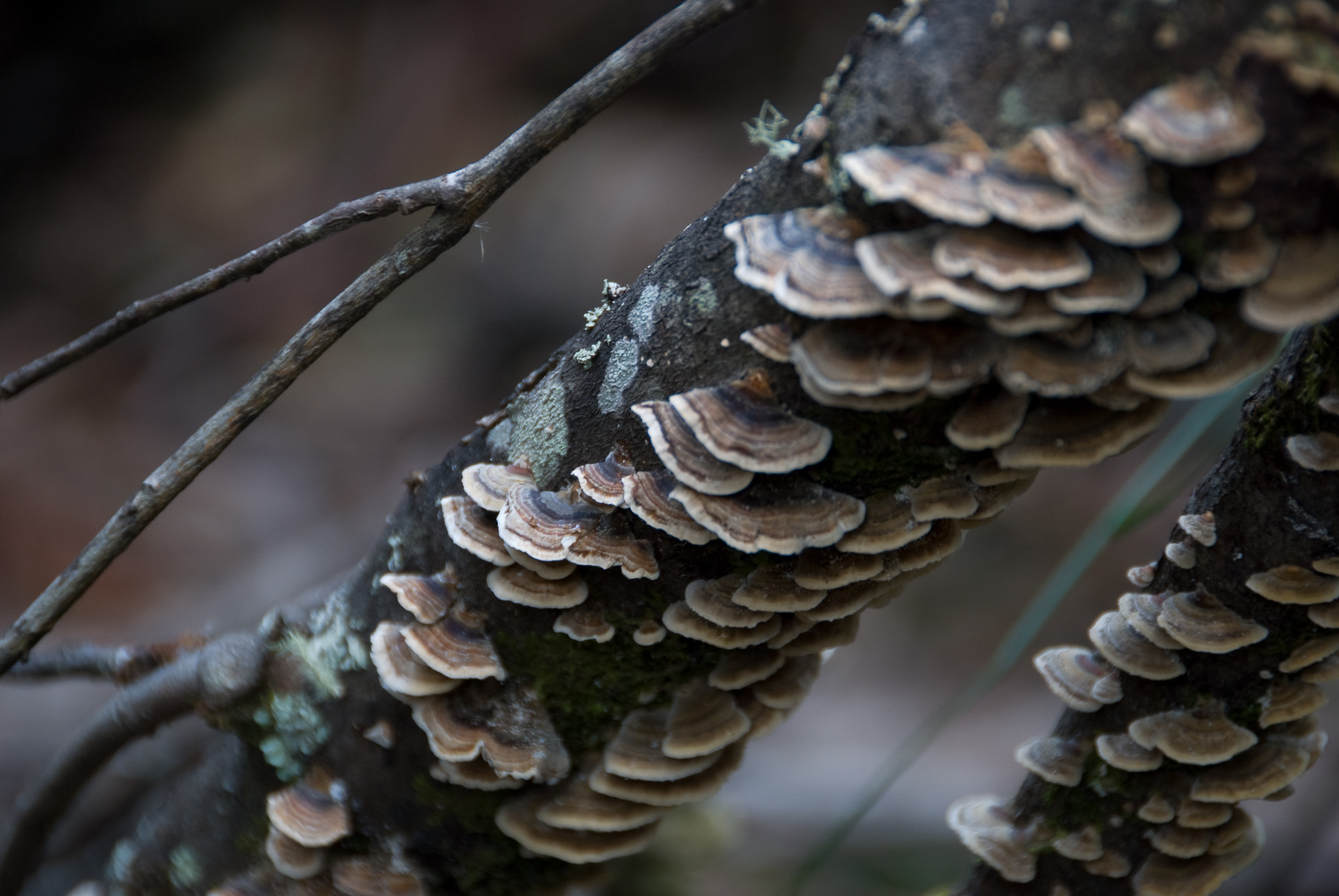

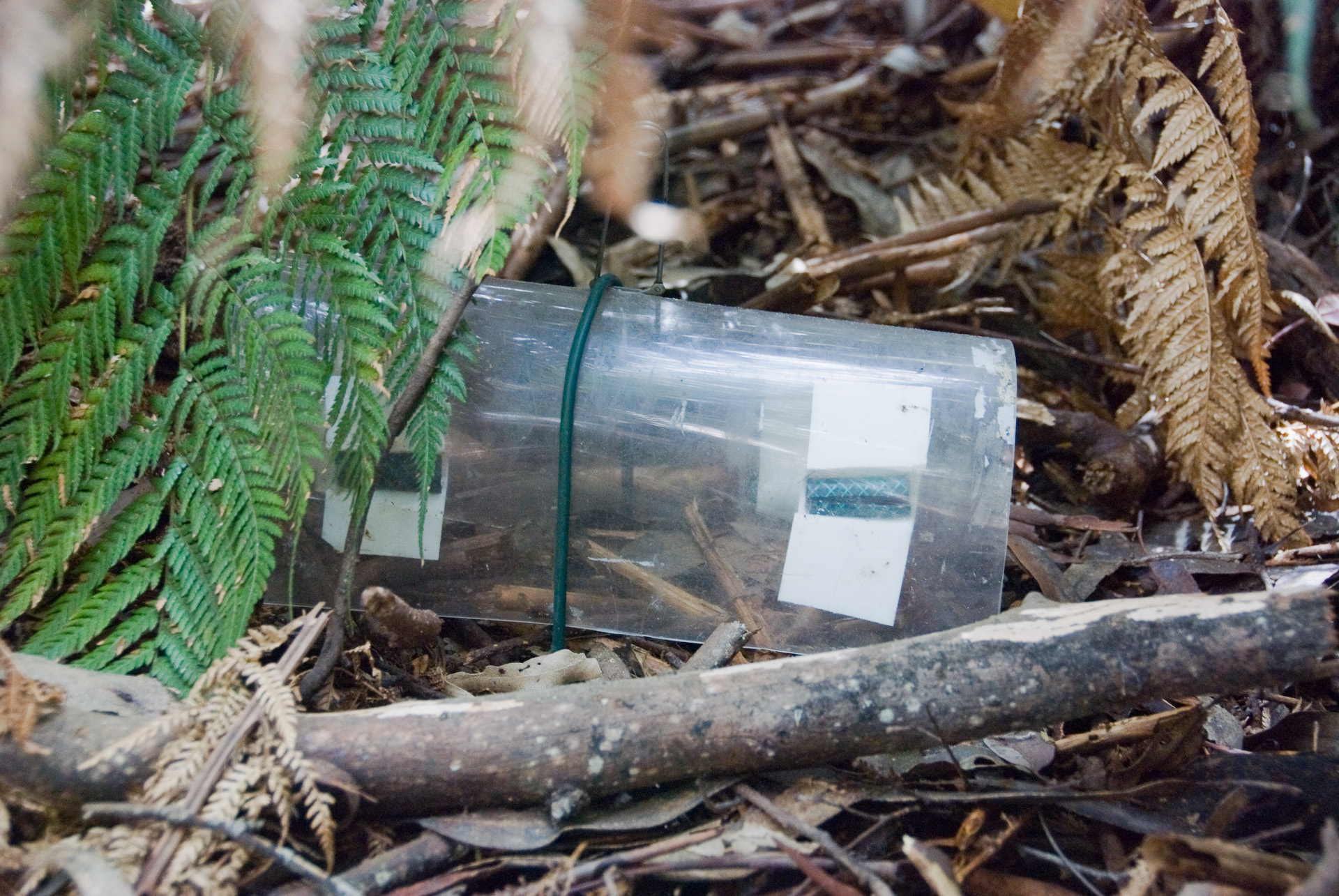
A "hair trap", to capture hairs from long-footed potoroos, for DNA identification.

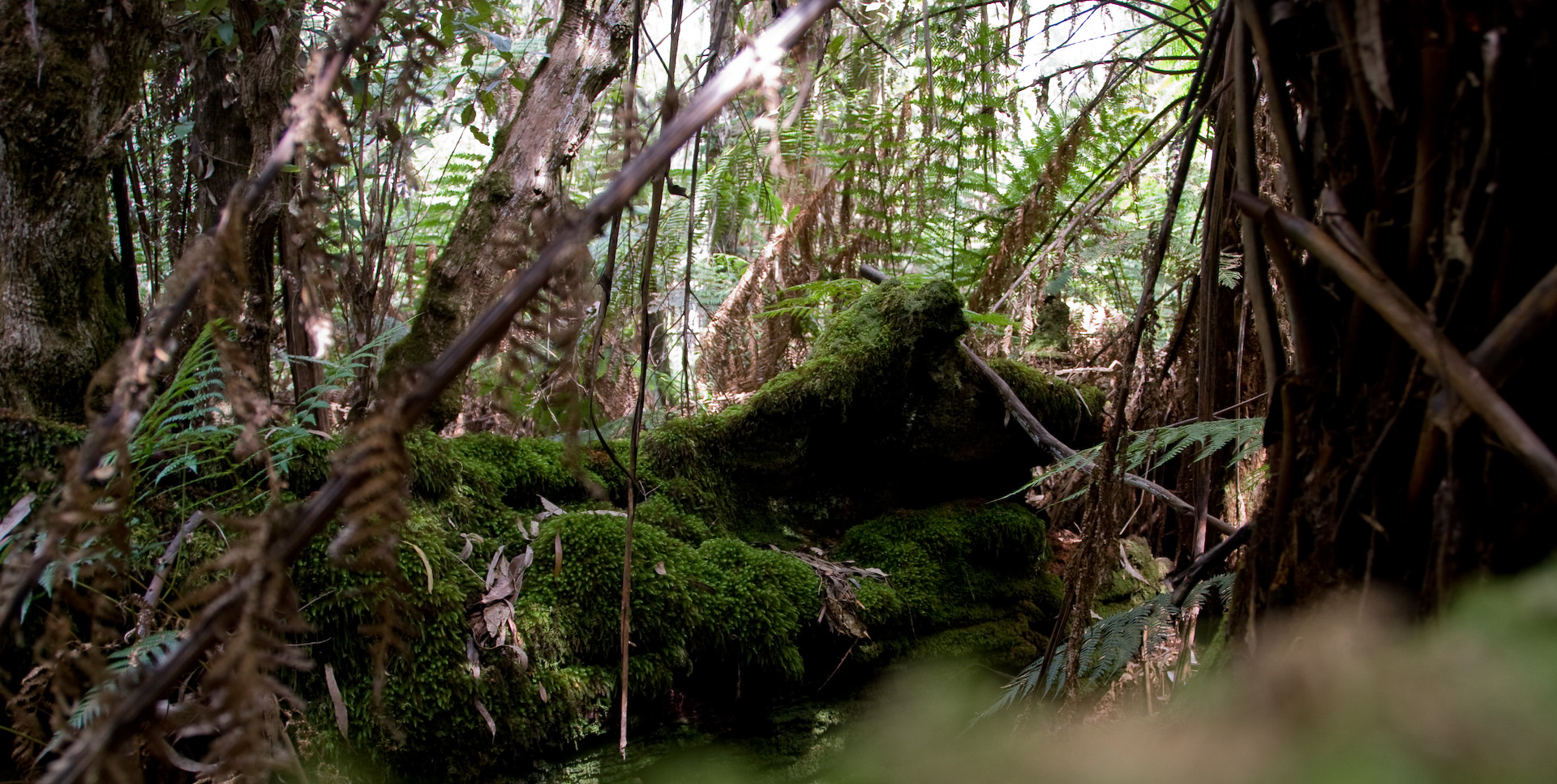

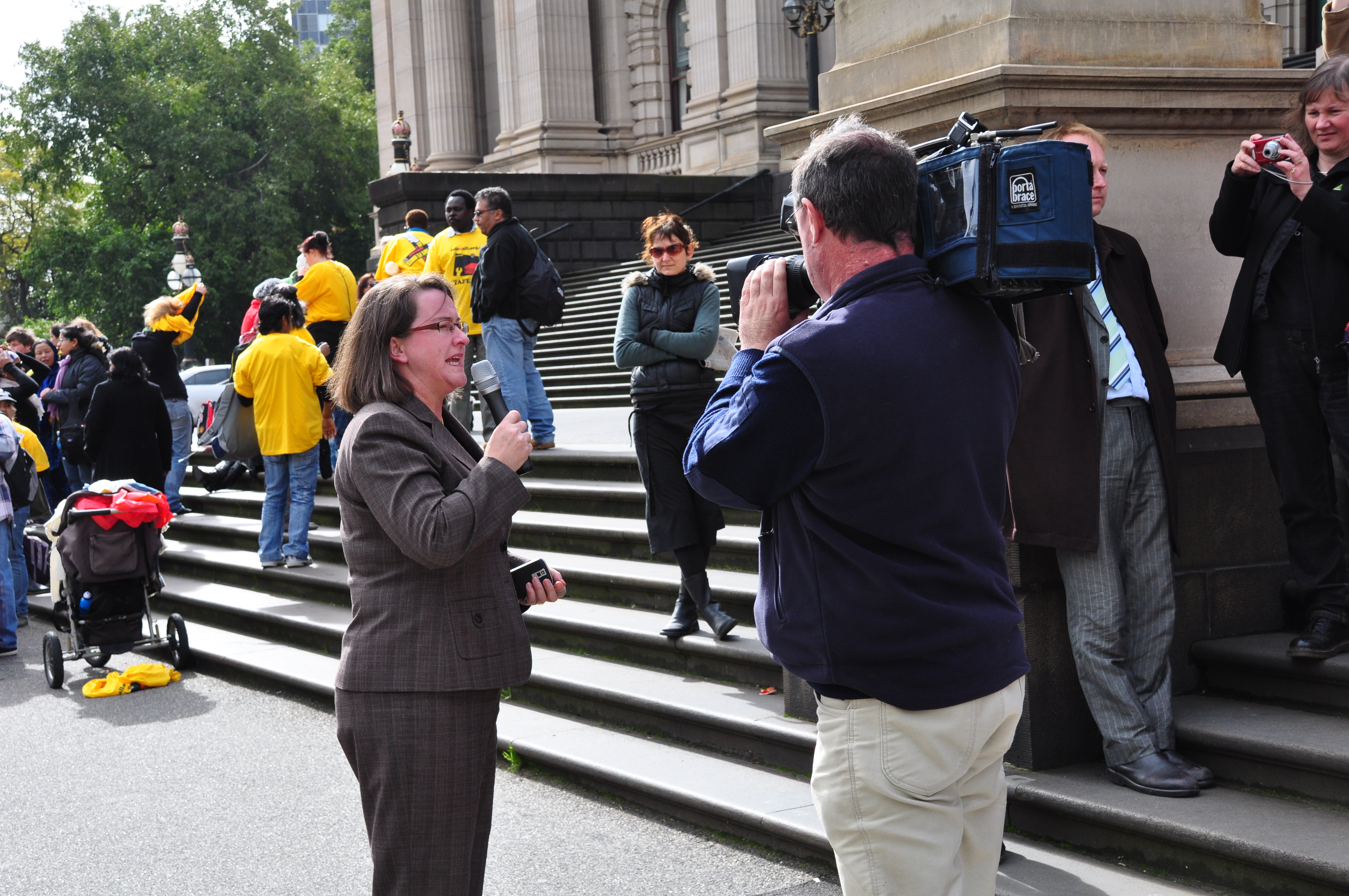
Mary Wooldridge addressing a protest about logging of Brown Mountain forest

== See also ==
- Protected areas of Victoria
