= Bemm River =

River in Victoria, Australia

Bemm
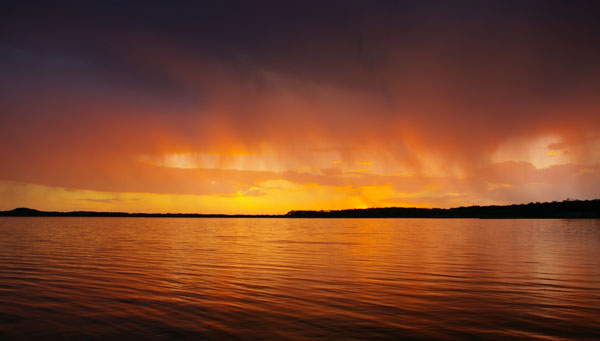
- Mouth of the Bemm River at Sydenham Inlet, 2006.

- Mouth of the Bemm River in Victoria
- Etymology: Aboriginal (Gunai): binn or birn meaning "fish hawk"
- Native name: Binn (Kurnai)

Location
- Country: Australia
- State: Victoria
- Region: South East Corner (IBRA), East Gippsland
- Local government area: Shire of East Gippsland
- Town: Bemm River

Physical characteristics
- Source confluence: Errinundra River and Combienbar River
  - location: Boulder Flat
  - coordinates: 37°28′34″S 148°55′39″E
  - elevation: 165 m (541 ft)
- Mouth: Sydenham Inlet, Bass Strait
  - location: Cape Conran Coastal Park
  - coordinates: 37°45′52″S 148°58′37″E
  - elevation: 0 m (0 ft)
- Length: 58 km (36 mi)

Basin features
- River system: East Gippsland catchment
- Tributaries
  - left: Pyramid Creek, Dinah Creek, Jungle Creek, Summer Creek
  - right: Nixon Creek, Goolengook River, Crabhole Creek, McKenzie River (Victoria), Bellbird Creek
- National park: Cape Conran CP

The Bemm River is a perennial river, located in the East Gippsland region of the Australian state of Victoria.

== Course and features ==
Formed by the confluence of the Errinundra and Combienbar rivers, the Bemm River rises below near Boulder Flat, northwest of the town of Cann River. The river flows generally south then south by east, through the Bemm River Scenic Reserve and the Cape Conran Coastal Park, joined by the Goolengook and McKenzie rivers and six minor tributaries, before reaching its mouth with Bass Strait via Sydenham Inlet in the Shire of East Gippsland, near the settlement of Bemm River. The river descends 165 metres (541 ft) over its 58 kilometres (36 mi) course.

The catchment area comprises mainly public land, including Errinundra National Park and the Lind National Park. These areas have a broad range of ecosystems including cool and warm temperate rainforest, ancient wet eucalypt forest, coastal heathland and banksia woodland. The Bemm River catchment area is managed by the East Gippsland Catchment Management Authority.

== Etymology ==
The name of the river is derived from the Aboriginal words binn or birn of the Gunai people, meaning "fish hawk".

== See also ==
- East Gippsland Catchment Management Authority
- List of rivers of Australia
