= Regional Forest Agreement =

Series of plans for conservation of Australian forests

The Regional Forest Agreements (RFA) are 20 year plans for the conservation and sustainable management of Australia's native forests, and are intended to provide certainty to commercial forestry operations while protecting environmental values. The 10 RFA's were progressively signed between 1997 and 2001. The RFA process grew out of the 1992 National Forest Policy Statement.

The Agreements relies on a mix of community and industry consultation combined with scientific research. While the Agreements are supported by forestry industry, they are widely criticized by environmentalist groups.

In Tasmania, a forestry operation that is undertaken in accordance with an RFA is not required obtain environmental approvals otherwise required by the Environment Protection and Biodiversity Conservation Act, nor to protect rare or threatened species listed in the CAR Reserve System. A conclusive presumption was added to the agreement in 2007 which states "The Parties agree that the CAR Reserve System, established in accordance with this Agreement, and the application of management strategies and management prescriptions developed under Tasmania's Forest Management Systems, protect rare and threatened fauna and flora species and Forest Communities". That is, the threatened species have simply been declared to be protected without regard for actual circumstances.

== Regions ==
There are currently 10 regions covered by RFAs:

- Western Australia,
- West Victoria,
- North East Victoria,
- Central Highlands Victoria,
- Gippsland Victoria,
- East Gippsland Victoria,
- Tasmania,
- Southern New South Wales,
- Eden New South Wales,
- North East New South Wales

== See also ==
- Forestry
- Deforestation
- Environment Protection and Biodiversity Conservation Act 1999
- Montréal Process
- Woodchipping in Australia
