= Goolengook =

Region in Australia

Coordinates: 37°27′18″S 148°48′56″E

The Goolengook valley is a remote forested region of south-eastern Australia, located near Orbost in the far eastern corner of Victoria. It contains a number of forest types including a rare warm temperate/cool temperate "Overlap Rainforest".

Goolengook is approximately 90 km^{2} of forest. Some of the forest has been logged but there is over 20 km^{2} of mature and old growth forest remaining. Some of the best stands of temperate rainforest for this part of Australia occur there.

It is the traditional land of the Bidawal Aboriginal people.

In 2006 the State Government suspended logging while an independent (but government-appointed) assessment was initiated to determine if it should be added to the Victorian Conservation Reserve System.

After ten years of campaigning for the protection of Goolengook, the Victorian State election of November 2006 saw the Australian Labor party returned, with a promise to protect the Goolengook block within a new National Park.

== Ecology ==
It is home to several endangered species such as the long-footed potoroo, sooty owl and spot-tailed quoll. Goolengook area is one of a limited number of critical sites for the conservation of threatened treeferns – specifically slender tree-fern (Cyathea cunninghamii) and skirted tree-fern (Cyathea × marcescens|Cyathea × marcescens). This is due in large part to the general infrequency of prescribed fire and wildfire within the forest block and the low levels of logging disturbance across the upper Goolengook River catchment.

== See also ==
- 2006 in the environment
- Goongerah, Victoria
- Rainforest
