= East Gippsland =

Region of Victoria, Australia

Coordinates: 37.3101°S 148.1366°E

East Gippsland is the eastern region of Gippsland, Victoria, Australia covering 31,740 km^{2} (12,250 sq mi) (14%) of Victoria. It has a population of 48,715.

== Geography ==
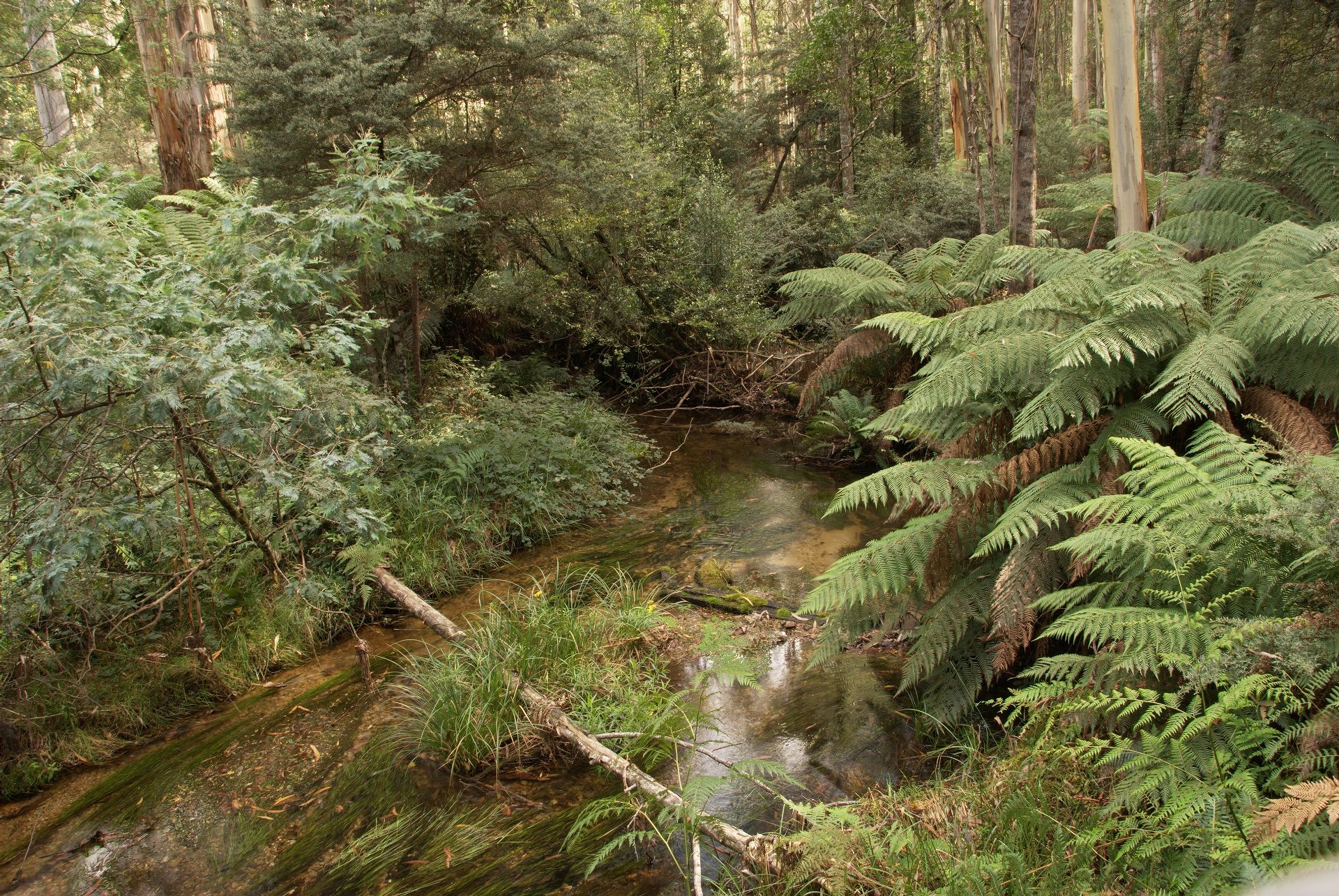
Bonang River

The Shire of East Gippsland, also called Far East Gippsland, covers two-thirds (66%) of East Gippsland's area and holds half (50%) of its population. The Shire of East Gippsland is confusingly also referred to simply as East Gippsland. It excludes the Shire of Wellington (Central Gippsland). This article (currently) refers mainly to "Far East Gippsland".

East Gippsland's major towns include, from west to east, Bairnsdale (the largest town and administrative centre), Paynesville, Lakes Entrance, Orbost and Mallacoota. Smaller, but significant, towns in the more mountainous northern areas include Ensay, Swifts Creek, Omeo, and Buchan.

=== Catchment area ===
East Gippsland extends from the western watershed of the Mitchell and Thomson River catchments east and north to the New South Wales border. Rugged terrain makes farming difficult, even with fertilisers. The major river basins of the Mitchell, Tambo and Nicholson drain into the Gippsland Lakes, which in turn empty into the sea through an artificially maintained opening at Lakes Entrance.

== Parks ==
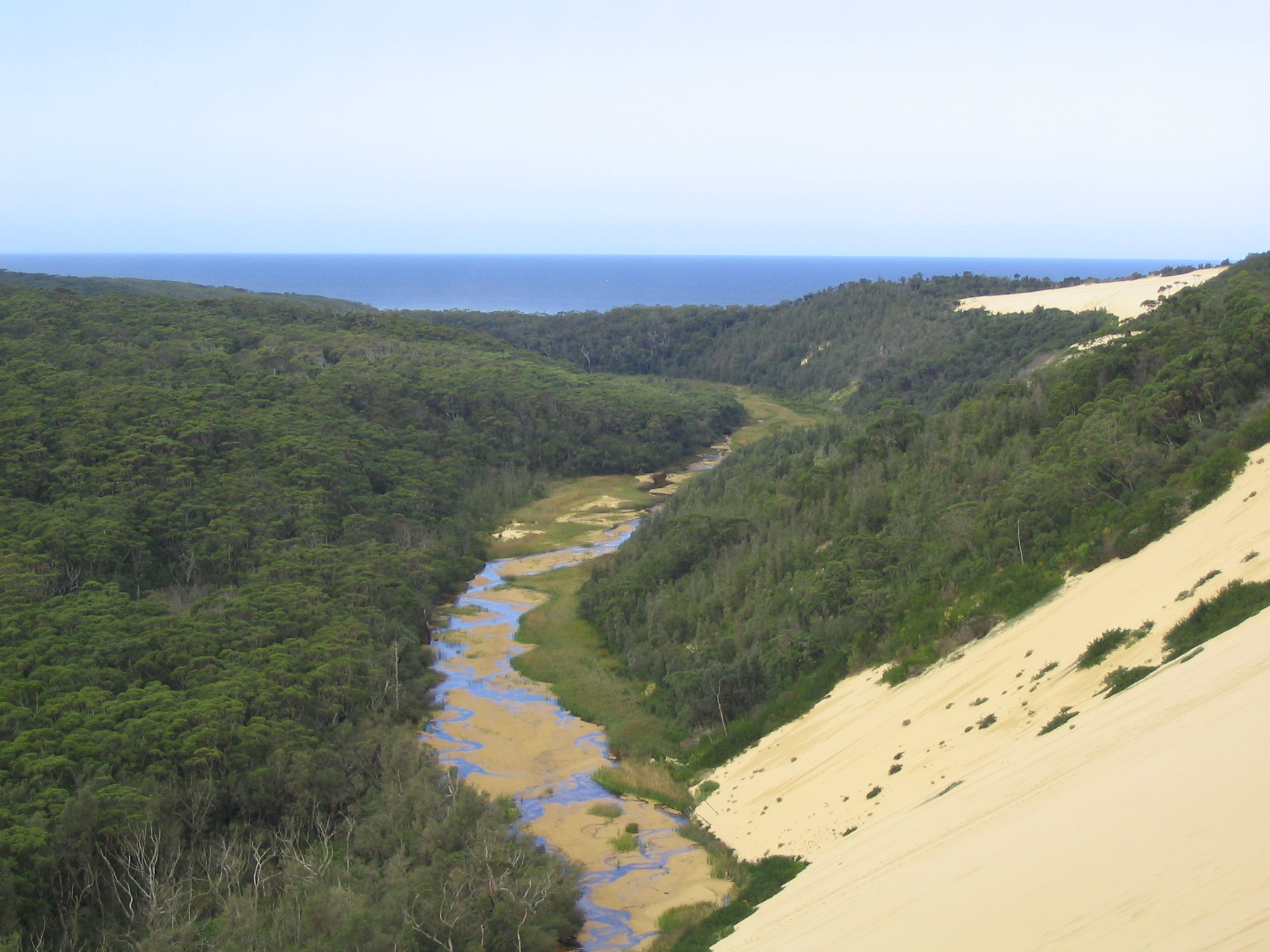
Thurra River in Croajingolong National Park

More than 17,000 km^{2} (6,600 sq mi) of East Gippsland is public land with 2,680 km^{2} (1,030 sq mi) in national parks, two of the largest being Snowy River National Park and Errinundra National Park. Both are remote and inaccessible, but they are otherwise entirely different. Snowy River National Park features dramatic gorges and powerful rapids formed by the descent of the Snowy River. Apart from gorges and southern slopes, this park is in a rain-shadow area forming the southern border of the Monaro Tableland. Consequently, many species more typical of inland New South Wales and Victoria are found here. Errinundra National Park is much wetter - inaccessible from June to October in most years - and features some of the most ancient forests in Australia, a matter of controversy as employment in the remote areas east of the Snowy was mainly dependent upon timber milling before the end of VicForest in 2024. Croajingolong National Park between Marlo and Mallacoota features extensive coastal heathlands and tea tree scrub, as well as the only major area of warm temperate rainforest in Victoria. The 4,193 km^{2} of privately owned land is mainly red gum plains, coastal plains, mountain plateaux and fertile river valleys.

== Tourism ==
The area is a major tourist destination, especially for watersports, and is noted for its mild climate. The Great Alpine Road leads north from Bairnsdale into the Australian Alps via Swifts Creek and Omeo, and onto the major ski resorts of Dinner Plain and Mount Hotham. This area is also very popular for bushwalking in the summer. The Buchan district is popular with tourists for its limestone caves. Further east, the Snowy River and several smaller stream catchments, including the Thurra, Wingan, Genoa, Bemm River and Cann River, enter the Tasman Sea.

== Forestry ==
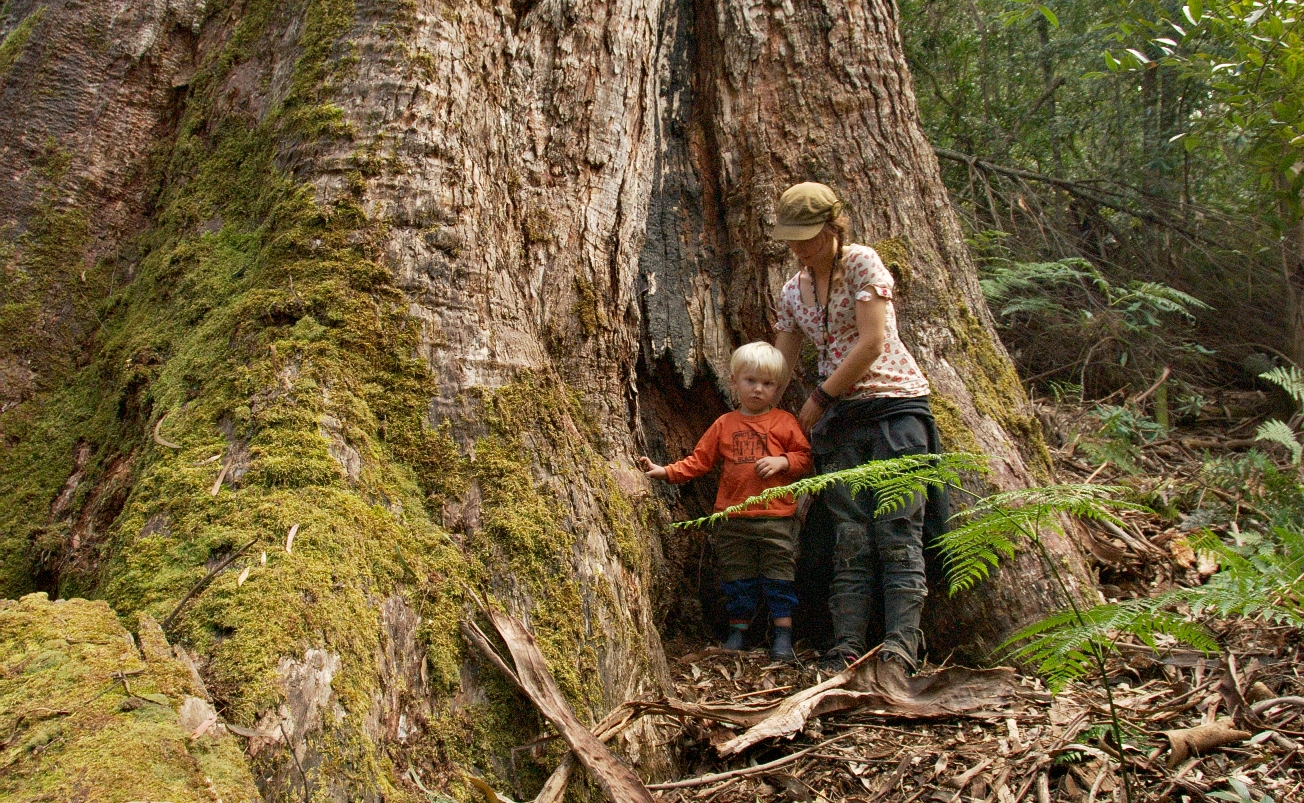
Old growth forest in Brown Mountain, near Errinundra National Park. Logging in 2008 cleared this area.

The major industry is often considered to be forestry, which provides less than 1 percent of employment for the region. The East Gippsland Regional Forest Agreement (RFA) was signed by Commonwealth and Victorian governments on 3 February 1997, and is Australia's first RFA. It covers a region similar, but not identical to the East Gippsland Shire. It sets aside 5,811 km^{2} (2,244 sq mi) from logging, an increase of 1.3% over pre-RFA reserves. Central Gippsland is covered by the Gippsland RFA (signed 31 March 2000), which covers an area similar to the Shire of Wellington, and places 7,805 km^{2} (3,014 sq mi) in reserves.

Logging of native forests has caused sustained controversy in East Gippsland, particularly due to the unique species found in areas east of the Snowy River, and the contentious public debate surrounding native forest, particularly old-growth, harvesting. This is despite managed forest having a mitigation effect in climate change.

== Environmental issues ==
In April and November 2022, East Gippsland Water got fined $9,246 for discharging over 30 million litres of wastewater into Macleod Morass wetland which made the facility exceed its licence given by EPA Victoria and failing to comply with their regulatory notice obligation.

== See also ==
- Catchment Management Authority (Victoria)
- Electoral district of Gippsland East
- Shire of East Gippsland
- Forests of Australia
