= South East Corner =

- Region
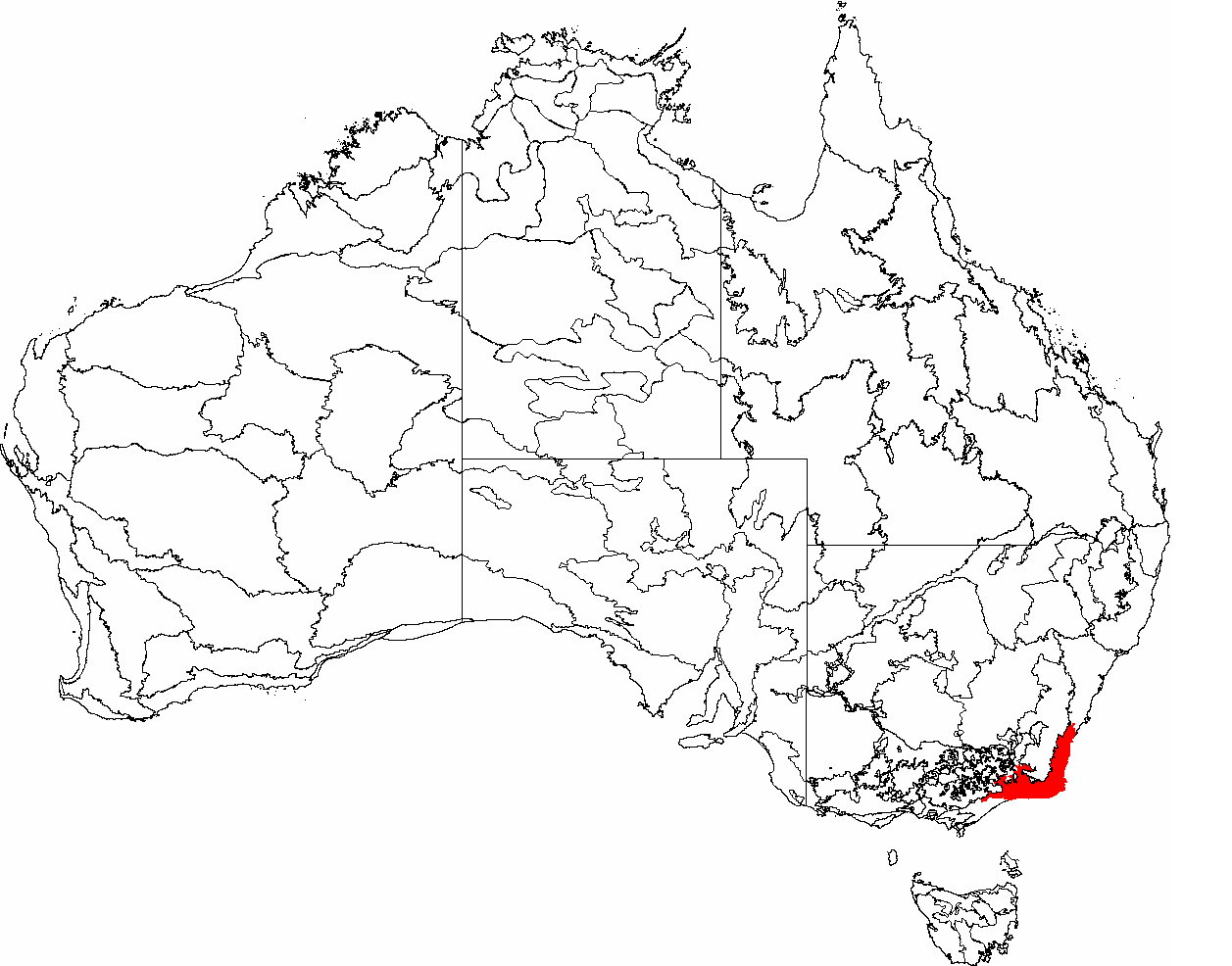
- The interim Australian bioregions, with the South East Corner in red
- Country: Australia
- State: Australia

Area
  - Total: 25,320.53 km^{2} (9,776.31 sq mi)
Localities around South East Corner
Australian Alps	South Eastern Highlands	Sydney Basin
South Eastern Highlands	South East Corner	Tasman Sea
South East Coastal Plain	Tasman Sea	Tasman Sea

The South East Corner is an interim Australian bioregion located in eastern Victoria and south-eastern New South Wales. It has an area of 2,532,053 hectares (6,256,840 acres). The South East Corner bioregion is part of the Southeast Australia temperate forests ecoregion, and it also features the Lowland Grassy Woodland.

== Subregions ==
The South East Corner bioregion consists of three subregions:

- East Gippsland Lowlands (SEC01) – 623,515 hectares (1,540,740 acres)
- South East Coastal Ranges (SEC02) – 1,734,517 hectares (4,286,080 acres)
- Bateman (SEC03) – 174,020 hectares (430,000 acres)
