= Catchment Management Authority (Victoria) =

The Catchment Management Authorities (CMAs) were established in Victoria under the Catchment and Land Protection Act 1994. Originally known as Catchment and Land Protection Boards, the CMAs were changed to their present name in 1997.

Catchment management authorities are unique because the area they govern corresponds to the naturally occurring drainage basins, enabling integrated catchment management.

== Catchment Management Authorities ==
There are 10 CMAs covering the whole of Victoria, these are divided into a total of 39 river basins (some basins are shared by more than one CMA):

- Corangamite
  - Barwon basin
  - Corangamite basin
  - Moorabool basin (part)
  - Otway basin
- East Gippsland
  - East Gippsland basin
  - Mitchell basin
  - Snowy basin
  - Tambo basin
- Glenelg Hopkins
  - Glenelg basin
  - Hopkins basin
  - Portland basin
- Goulburn Broken
  - Broken basin
  - Goulburn basin
- Mallee
  - Avoca basin (part)
  - Mallee basin
  - Wimmera basin (part)
- North Central
  - Campaspe basin
  - Loddon basin
  - Avoca basin (part)
  - Wimmera basin (part)
- North East
  - Kiewa basin
  - Ovens basin
  - Upper Murray basin
- Port Phillip and Western Port
  - Bunyip basin
  - Maribyrnong basin
  - Moorabool basin (part)
  - South Gippsland basin (part)
  - Werribee basin
  - Yarra basin
- West Gippsland
  - Latrobe basin
  - South Gippsland basin (part)
  - Thomson basin
- Wimmera
  - Millicent Coast basin
  - Wimmera basin (part)

== Regional catchment strategies ==
Every 5 years the CMAs are required under Section 12 of the Act, to produce a regional catchment strategy, which is a statement of how the CMA plans to manage its region over the coming 5 years and is developed with the principles of integrated catchment management. It should cover the condition of the land and water, assess land degradation and prioritise areas for attention, set out a program of works to be undertaken and who will be undertaking the works, specify how the works and land and water condition will be monitored and provide for review of the strategy. The regional catchment strategy can also undertake to provide incentives to landholders, educational programs, research and other services.

== See also ==
- Integrated catchment management
- Catchment management
