= Errinundra National Park =

National park in Victoria, Australia

- IUCN category II (national park)
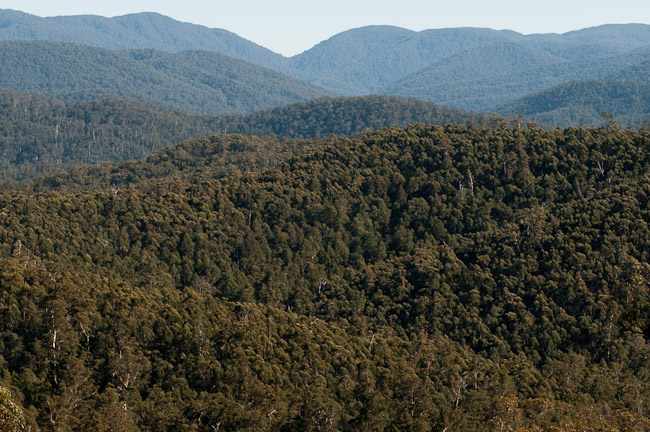
- Errinundra National Park

- Location within Victoria
- Location: Victoria
- Nearest city: Club Terrace
- Coordinates: 37°17′09″S 148°53′41″E
- Area: 268.75 km^{2} (103.76 sq mi)
- Established: 15 July 1988
- Governing body: Parks Victoria
- Website: Official website

The Errinundra National Park is a national park located in the Gippsland region of Victoria, Australia. The 26,875-hectare (66,410-acre) national park is situated 373 kilometres (232 mi) east of Melbourne via the Princes Highway and is centred on the Errinundra Plateau, a southwards extension of the Monaro Tablelands of New South Wales.

== Features ==
The Errinundra National Park preserves the largest remaining cool temperate rainforest in Victoria and supports some of south eastern Australia's most spectacular old growth forests. There are also many rare and threatened species of flora and fauna, including powerful owls, tiger quolls and long-footed potoroos.

Cool and warm temperate rainforest, wet open forest, montane forests and woodlands are the dominant vegetation communities. There is also a sub-alpine wetland.

The majority of the park is accessible only in the drier months. In winter, rain and snow generally make the unsealed roads impassable.

There has been extensive logging of all forest types surrounding the park including Brown Mountain forest and there have been some instances of logging within the national park's boundaries due to administrative errors. In addition, logging occurred in many areas before the national park was established.

== See also ==
- Tarra-Bulga National Park
- Protected areas of Victoria
- List of national parks of Australia
