= Paradise Beach, Victoria =

Paradise Beach
- Town
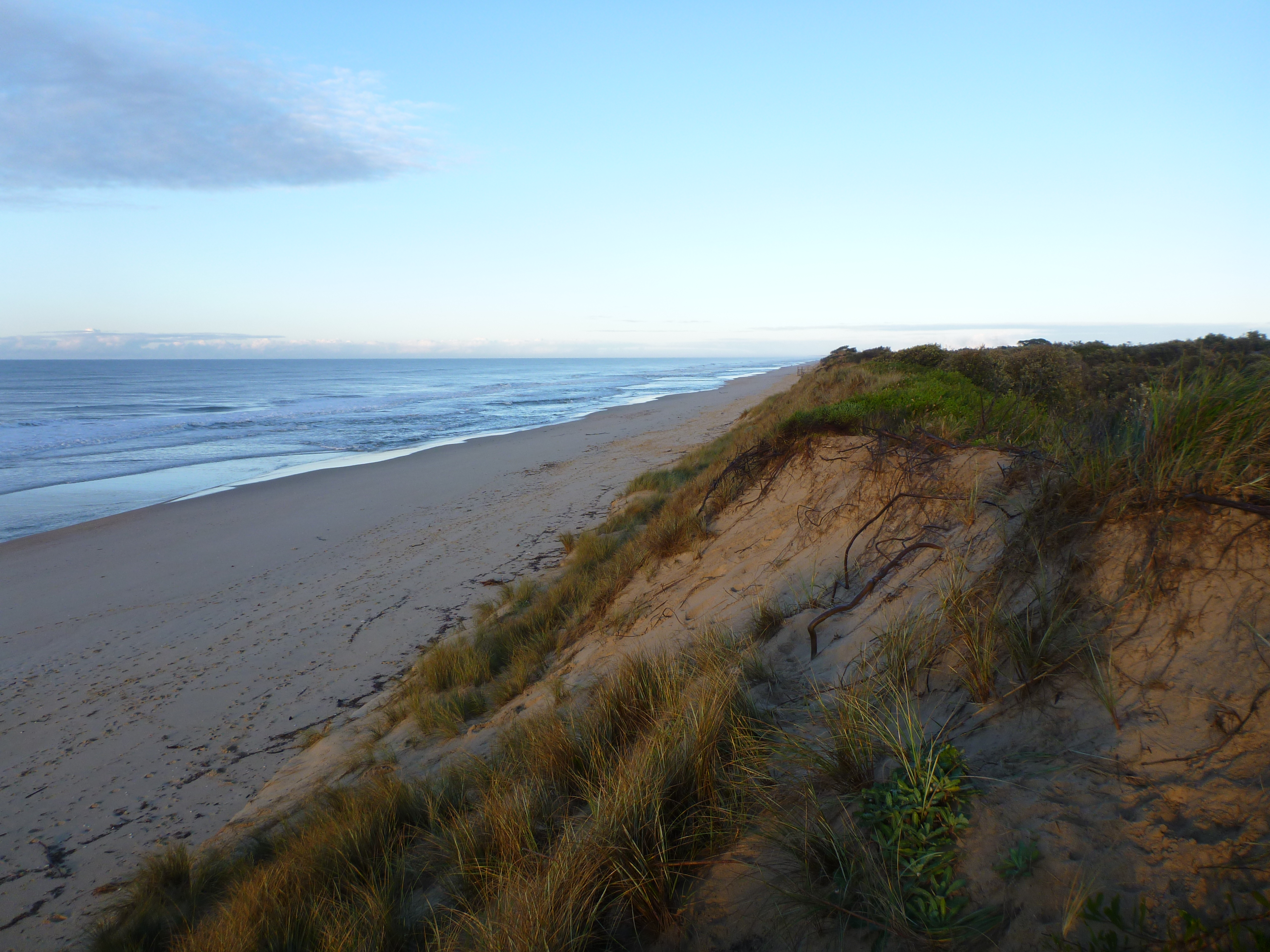

- Coordinates: 38°08′14″S 147°26′59″E
- Country: Australia
- State: Victoria
- LGA: Shire of Wellington
- Location: 250 km (160 mi) SE of Melbourne; 42 km (26 mi) SE of Sale; 87 km (54 mi) NE of Yarram

Government
  - State electorate: Gippsland South
  - Federal division: Gippsland

Population
  - Total: 160 (2016 census)
- Postcode: 3851

Paradise Beach is a town situated on the Ninety Mile Beach in Gippsland Victoria. Located near the holiday hamlet of Golden Beach. As with the case of most holiday hamlets in Australia, the housing is unoccupied for most of the year, families moving in to stay during the summer months. The beaches there offer long distances for walking and fishing, but are not patrolled. Together with its nearest neighbour there were 750 houses but only 444 persons on Census night 2016. It has kangaroos on the golf course, a playground near the shops and a lookout deck near the ocean beach. There are many nearby wildlife reserves which are sanctuaries for water birds and other species. Seaspray and Loch Sport are nearby settlements which are slightly more developed with eating places and a caravan park.

Pastoralist William Letts purchased the land from the state government and it become known as Letts' beach. In the late 1940s, a developer changed the name from Letts' Beach to the more appealing Paradise Beach and Golden Beach. In the early 1950s the area was promoted as the "Surfers Paradise of Victoria". In 2011 there were 330 persons within the twin towns of Golden Beach and Paradise Beach.

In 2020, the Wellington Shire Council decided to acquire the remaining 750 undeveloped lots in a coastal subdivision located between Paradise Beach and The Honeysuckles. This area, marketed and sold between 1955 and 1969, attracted many buyers, including migrants from Melbourne. The subdivision consisted of approximately 11,800 small lots, many of which were later identified as being located in flood-prone areas.
