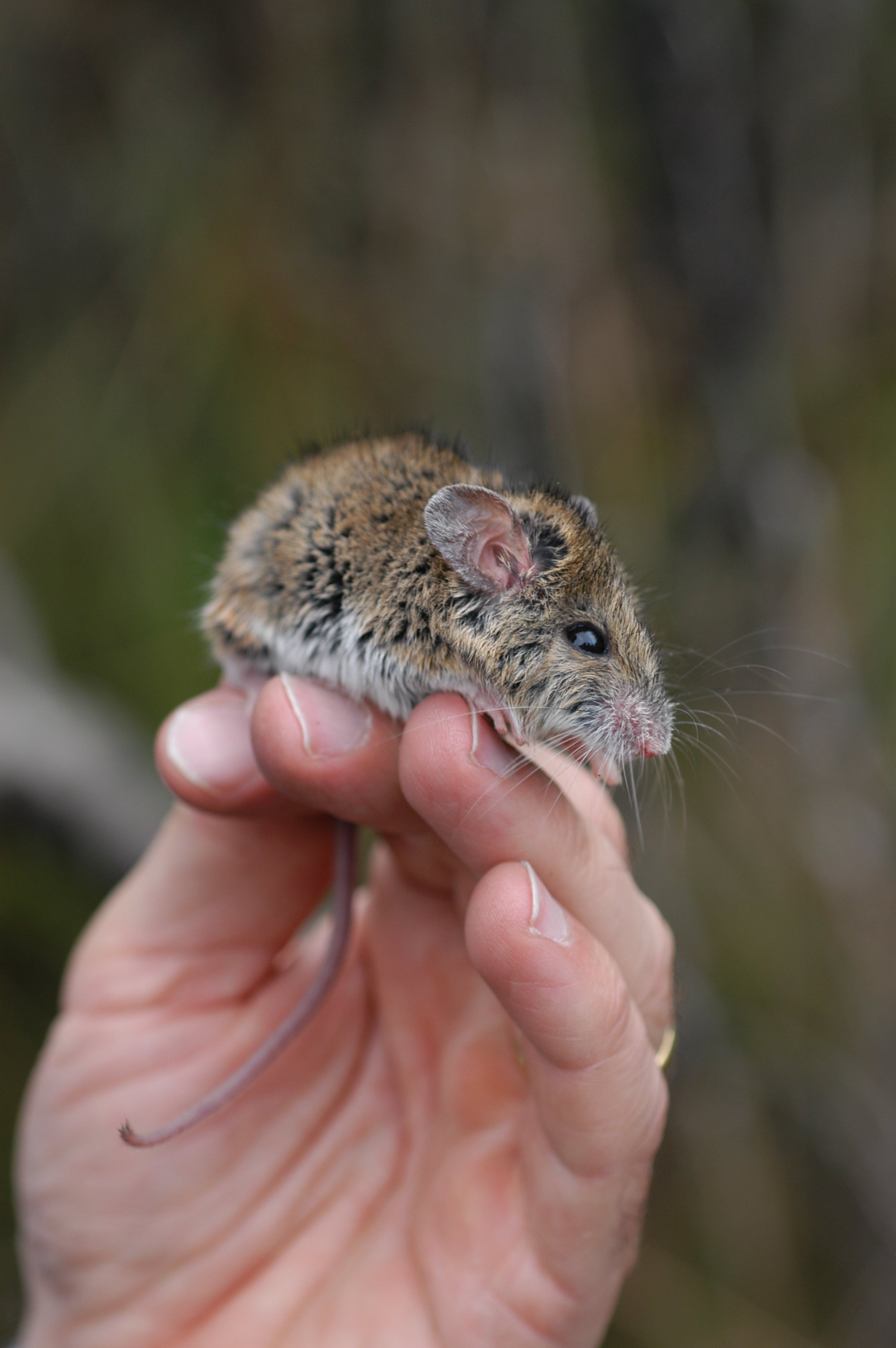

Conservation status
- Vulnerable (IUCN 3.1)

Scientific classification
- Kingdom: Animalia
- Phylum: Chordata
- Class: Mammalia
- Order: Rodentia
- Family: Muridae
- Genus: Pseudomys
- Species: P. novaehollandiae

Binomial name
- Pseudomys novaehollandiae (Waterhouse, 1843)

= New Holland mouse =

Species of rodent

The New Holland mouse (Pseudomys novaehollandiae) also known as a Pookila is a species of rodent in the family Muridae. It was first described by George Waterhouse in 1843. It vanished from view for over a century before its rediscovery in Ku-ring-gai Chase National Park north of Sydney in 1967. It is found only in south east Australia, within the states of New South Wales, Queensland, Victoria, and Tasmania.

== Description ==
The New Holland mouse has a grey-brown fur with a dusky-brown tail, which is darker on the dorsal side. Its body length is roughly 65–90mm, with a tail length of 80–105 mm (3.1–4.1 in), and a hind foot length of approximately 20–22 mm (0.79–0.87 in). The New Holland mouse's size has been shown to vary slightly depending on the environment. Populations of New Holland mice that live in Tasmania, have a slightly larger body weight than those that are from New South Wales and Victoria. Despite this, however, the head shape and length share the measurements as in Tasmania, New South Wales, and Victoria.

It has also been noted that the New Holland mouse looks very similar to the common house mouse, which was introduced to the area by European settlers. It can be differentiated from the common house mouse however by its ears and eyes, which are slightly larger than the common house mouse. Also, the New Holland mouse lacks the presence of a notch on the upper incisors and a 'mousy' odor is absent.

== Habitat and ecology ==
The New Holland mouse is a nocturnal species inhabiting environments such as woodlands, forests with a heathland understorey and vegetated sand dunes, and open heathlands. It is a social species. The mice live in burrows carved out by colonies in softer sands.

The New Holland mouse has been shown to increase in prominence promptly after a wildfire or sand mining has occurred; usually two to three years afterwards. The species is most common during the early/mid portions of vegetation succession. In Tasmania however, they have been found in areas that contained vegetation as far as 16 years post fire.

== Diet ==
The New Holland is omnivorous. While active at night, it spends a majority of its time foraging for seeds above ground. Although seeds are the most prominent component of the New Holland mouse's diet, it also consumes leaves, fungi and small invertebrates.

Studies observed that overall they consumed 27% dicotyledon leaf, 29% fungi, 17% invertebrates, and 14% seeds. There can be dietary differences depending on the local vegetation.

== Reproduction ==
Most New Holland mice are born between the months of August and January, and their breeding patterns are based on the amount of food obtained, which depends on rainfall. Litters are normally between one and six mice. During their first year of reproduction, females will normally produce only one litter a season, but during their second year they can produce up to three or four litters. Males reach sexual maturity at around twenty weeks, females mature at around thirteen weeks. Births occur in the mother's nest during the day.

== Populations ==
The New Holland mouse's geographic range consists of fragmented populations throughout Tasmania, Victoria, New South Wales, and Queensland. Based on genetic evidence, it is believed that the New Holland mouse existed in one large population on mainland Australia. Furthermore, based on the distribution of subfossils, it has been suggested that the species has experienced a dramatic contraction of its normal range since the region was settled by Europeans.

The New Holland mouse is as of 2021 listed as a vulnerable species due to its population size (estimated at 8,000) and density, and their rates of decline.

The first living animals were recorded in the state of Victoria in 1970 on the Mornington Peninsula. The New Holland mouse has since been discovered in Victoria at a number of near coastal locations, mostly to the east of Melbourne, including Cranbourne, Langwarrin, Yanakie Isthmus, the south-western end of the Ninety Mile Beach and a number of sites near Loch Sport, Mullundung State Forest and Providence Ponds. A number of these populations are now thought to be extinct.

One known population occurs to the west of Melbourne, in the eastern Otway Ranges near Anglesea. The Anglesea population, discovered in 1980, comprises a number of sub-populations which were intensively studied by Deakin University researchers throughout the 1980s and 1990s. Some of the Anglesea sub-populations became extinct after the 1983 Ash Wednesday bushfires. Others have persisted until at least the mid-1990s. The current status of the Angelsea sub-populations is uncertain, but they may be now locally extinct.

In October 2021, as part of a survey across north-eastern Tasmania on the mouse, an individual was detected on Flinders Island for the first time in 17 years on the island, and the first in 12 years in the state.

== Major threats ==
The New Holland mouse has steadily been put in greater peril over time. There are many dangers that plague the Pseudomys novaehollandiae and pose a severe threat to its very existence. One such threat in direct relation to the habitat of the mouse is the fact that modifications of the land that these creatures inhabit are being made in the process of the developing the land for other beneficiary uses. The development of these lands are in no way for the benefit of the mice upon which they call home. In addition, the invasion of several types of weeds and fungus, harmful to the mice, have begun growing in the environment, in close proximity, to the habitats of the New Holland mice. The fungus, commonly referred to as "Cinnamon Fungus", emits a pathogen which alters the fauna and structure of the potential resources such as vegetables of which the mice rely on for food. Also, equally as dangerous to the existence of the mice is the inappropriate management of fire and the subsequent environmental constraints such events have on the ability for populations to access the necessary sustenance to survive and reproduce. As a result of such fires, habits may be left fragmented with no suitable patches of land capable of sustaining a suitable life for the mice. Another potential danger to this species of mice that has been identified regards the climate of the environments these particular mice inhabit. Many scientists have speculated on various climatic environmental processes in a given location and created detailed models to project the status of the species in the future. Current models display strong evidence towards an eventual decline of about 50% in population.

The most severe and pressing danger in regards to the existence of the New Holland mouse comes directly from the threat of predators in the environment. Predation is brought upon by the natural predators in the environment. Such predators include the red fox, cats, and dogs. These animals have been identified as the major predators due to the reported increase in populations of predators in areas where large populations of the New Holland mouse have been documented. In addition to the increase of predators, an increase in competition for resources in the environment has also been noted as a contributor to their decline. The competition is most frequently encountered between other species of rodents in the same habitat.

== Conservation plans ==
The New Holland mouse is primarily threatened by alteration and loss of suitable habitat. At first the loss of habitat was mainly caused by clearing, but now frequent fires and predation by the introduced red fox and cat are potential threats to this species. The species was regarded as rare when it was discovered in 1970, many of the areas that once supported the New Holland mouse now have small to non-existent populations of this species. The Scientific Advisory Committee determined that "(1). [The New Holland mouse] is in a demonstrable state of decline which is likely to result in extinction; and (2) very rare in terms of abundance or distribution".

The conservation objectives in relation to the New Holland mouse are as follows: "To prevent further decline in population and restore the existing distributional range of the species to its pre-European extent so that the New Holland mouse can survive, flourish and retain its potential for evolutionary development in the wild".

It is currently known that loss in successional vegetation is leading to the decline of the New Holland mice, but it is also possible loss of plant species diversity is also a factor. Populations that became extinct did so very rapidly, normally between one and three years, however, colonisation was also very quick, average of .9 to 2 years. This suggests that there are many suitable habitats that can house these mice. In 1990, after many studies of small mammals in Victoria were conducted, Deakin University received $10,000 from the National Estate Grants Program to review the populations and distributions of the New Holland mouse, and to identify the processes of habitat modification which threatens the species. This research found that there are multiple populations in different areas that have already become extinct, there are still mice in some areas that are considered uninhabitable and those populations are decreasing, and that a lot of heath has been burnt leading to the extinction of certain populations.

Long-term persistence of this species will probably require well-planned fire management regimes within its habitat, throughout its range. Prescribed burning is currently conducted for a variety of reasons, including protection of human life and property, and habitat management. Management for the New Holland mouse should be incorporated into appropriate FFMV fire protection plans. The New Holland mouse occurs in association with other native mammals, including the brown antechinus (Antechinus stuartii), white-footed dunnart (Sminthopsis leucopus), southern brown bandicoot (Isoodon obesulus), bush rat (Rattus fuscipes), swamp rat (Rattus lutreolus) and eastern pygmy possum (Cercartetus nanus). Activities such as prescribed burning may not always benefit these species, nor the many other vertebrates, invertebrates, plants and other organisms present. Nevertheless, regimes could be formulated to adequately cater for some specific requirements, given that there is sufficient area of habitat. Small-scale mosaic burns should not endanger other vertebrate species at a local level, and may benefit native plants.

The 2021 survey and conservation assessment in north-eastern Tasmania, funded by the Commonwealth Government, will inform a national recovery plan for the mouse.

=== Conservation efforts to combat feral cats ===
- Threat Abatement Plan for Predation by Feral Cats (DEWHA, 2008)

=== Conservation efforts to combat red fox ===
- Threat Abatement Plan for Predation by European red fox (DEWHA 2008)

=== Conservation efforts to combat habitat loss ===
- Living with Fire – Victoria's Bushfire Strategy (DSE, 2008)
- Threat Abatement Plan for Disease in Natural Ecosystems caused by Phytophthora cinnamomi (DEWHA, 2009)

=== Other conservation efforts ===
- Draft Flora and Fauna Guarantee Action Statement - New Holland Mouse Pseudomys novaehollandiae (DSE, 2009)
- Flora and Fauna Guarantee Action Statement No. 74, New Holland Mouse Pseudomys novaehollandiae (DNRE, 1996)

== Conservation status ==
The New Holland mouse is classified as vulnerable by the IUCN. It is listed as a threatened (vulnerable) species on the Commonwealth Environment Protection and Biodiversity Conservation Act 1999, and as threatened on the Victorian Flora and Fauna Guarantee Act 1988. An Action Statement has also been prepared for the New Holland mouse under this Act.

It is also listed as endangered in Victoria on the Department of Sustainability and Environment 2003 advisory list of threatened vertebrate fauna.
