= Ninety Mile Beach =

Ninety Mile Beach may refer to:

== Beaches ==
- Eighty Mile Beach, Western Australia, formerly called Ninety Mile Beach
- Ninety Mile Beach, New Zealand
- Ninety Mile Beach, Victoria, in Australia
- Ninety Mile Beach Marine National Park, in Victoria, Australia

== Other ==
- "Ninety Mile Beach", a song by Wolf Alice from the 2013 EP Blush
