= Gippsland Lakes Coastal Park =

Protected area in Victoria, Australia

- IUCN category II (national park)
- Location within Victoria
- Location: Victoria
- Nearest city: Lakes Entrance
- Coordinates: 38°6′S 147°30′E
- Area: 17,600 ha (68 sq mi)
- Established: April 1979
- Governing body: Parks Victoria jointly with the Gunaikurnai Land and Waters Aboriginal Corporation
- Website: Official website

The Gippsland Lakes Coastal Park is a coastal park in the East Gippsland region of Victoria, Australia. The park is located approximately 240 km (150 miles) east of the capital city of Melbourne.

== Location and features ==
The 17,600-hectare (43,000-acre) park was established in April 1979 and is set on the east coast of Victoria, with its eastern boundary facing Bass Strait and its western boundary facing both The Lakes National Park and the eastern shores of the Gippsland Lakes. The park's northern boundary is south of Lakes Entrance and its southern boundary is north of Seaspray. The park includes the Ninety Mile Beach. Since 2010, the park has been managed by Parks Victoria jointly with the Gunaikurnai Land and Waters Aboriginal Corporation.

== See also ==
- Ninety Mile Beach Marine National Park
- Protected areas of Victoria
- The Lakes National Park
