= Rotamah Island =

Island in Victoria, Australia

- Location within Shire of East Gippsland

Geography
- Location: Gippsland Lakes
- Coordinates: 37°58′34″S 147°43′37″E

Administration
- Australia
- State: Victoria

Rotamah Island, or Gellung-warl in the Kurnai language, is a river island in The Lakes National Park, in the Gippsland Lakes of Victoria, Australia, about 6 kilometres (3.7 mi) from Paynesville, from which it is accessible by boat.

== Features ==
- Eucalypt and banksia woodland
- Prolific bird life with over 190 species recorded
- Kangaroos, wallabies, possums, echidnas and Hog Deer

== Recent history ==
- 1975 - Purchased by the Victorian Government
- 1978 - Rotamah and Little Rotamah Islands added to The Lakes National Park
- 1979-2001 - Birds Australia leases the island's homestead to operate as the Rotamah Island Bird Observatory
