= Rotamah Island Bird Observatory =

Coordinates: 37.9747°S 147.7252°E

Rotamah Island Bird Observatory was established in 1979 on Rotamah Island in the Gippsland Lakes National Park in eastern Victoria, Australia, by Birds Australia as Australia's second bird observatory, in order to provide a base for the study and enjoyment of the birds of the area.

Rotamah Island had previously been a farming property, and the observatory was established in 'Overstrand', the homestead built in 1908. In 1985 the observatory was visited by Prince Charles and Diana, Princess of Wales. The natural vegetation of Rotamah Island is eucalypt woodland. There is also a causeway linking the island to Ninety Mile Beach. These factors give visitors easy access to both freshwater and marine habitats. There is a small population of the introduced Hog Deer on the island.

In 2001 negotiations between Birds Australia and Parks Victoria, on renewal of the lease to the observatory, broke down and Birds Australia's association with Rotamah Island ended.
