= Paynesville, Victoria =

Paynesville
- Town
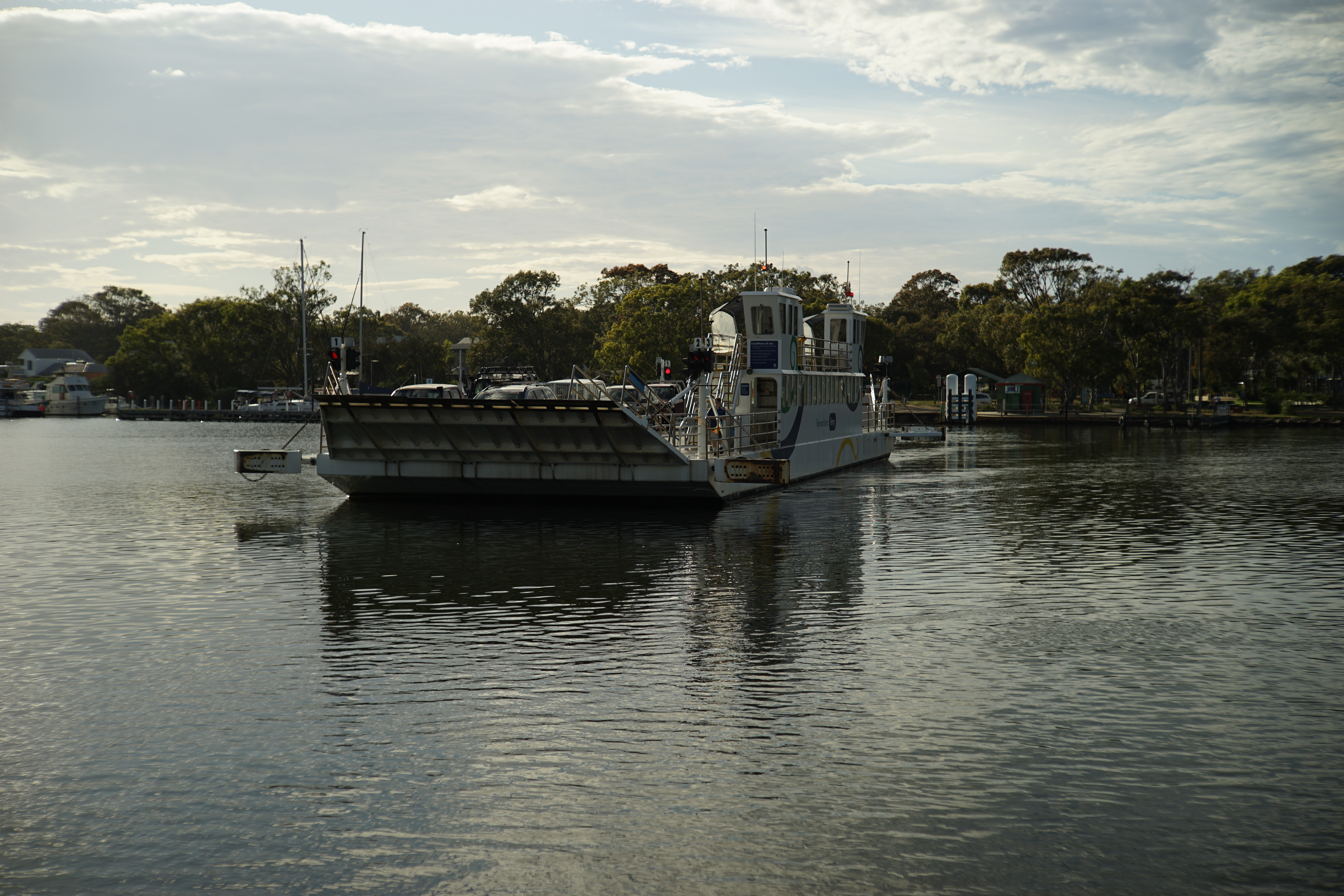
- Raymond Island chain ferry travelling from the Island towards the mainland at Paynesville, Victoria.

- Coordinates: 37°55′0″S 147°43′0″E
- Country: Australia
- State: Victoria
- LGA: Shire of East Gippsland
- Location: 293 km (182 mi) E of Melbourne; 79 km (49 mi) NE of Sale; 17 km (11 mi) SE of Bairnsdale

Government
  - State electorate: Gippsland East
  - Federal division: Gippsland

Population
  - Total: 3,636 (2021 census)
- Postcode: 3880

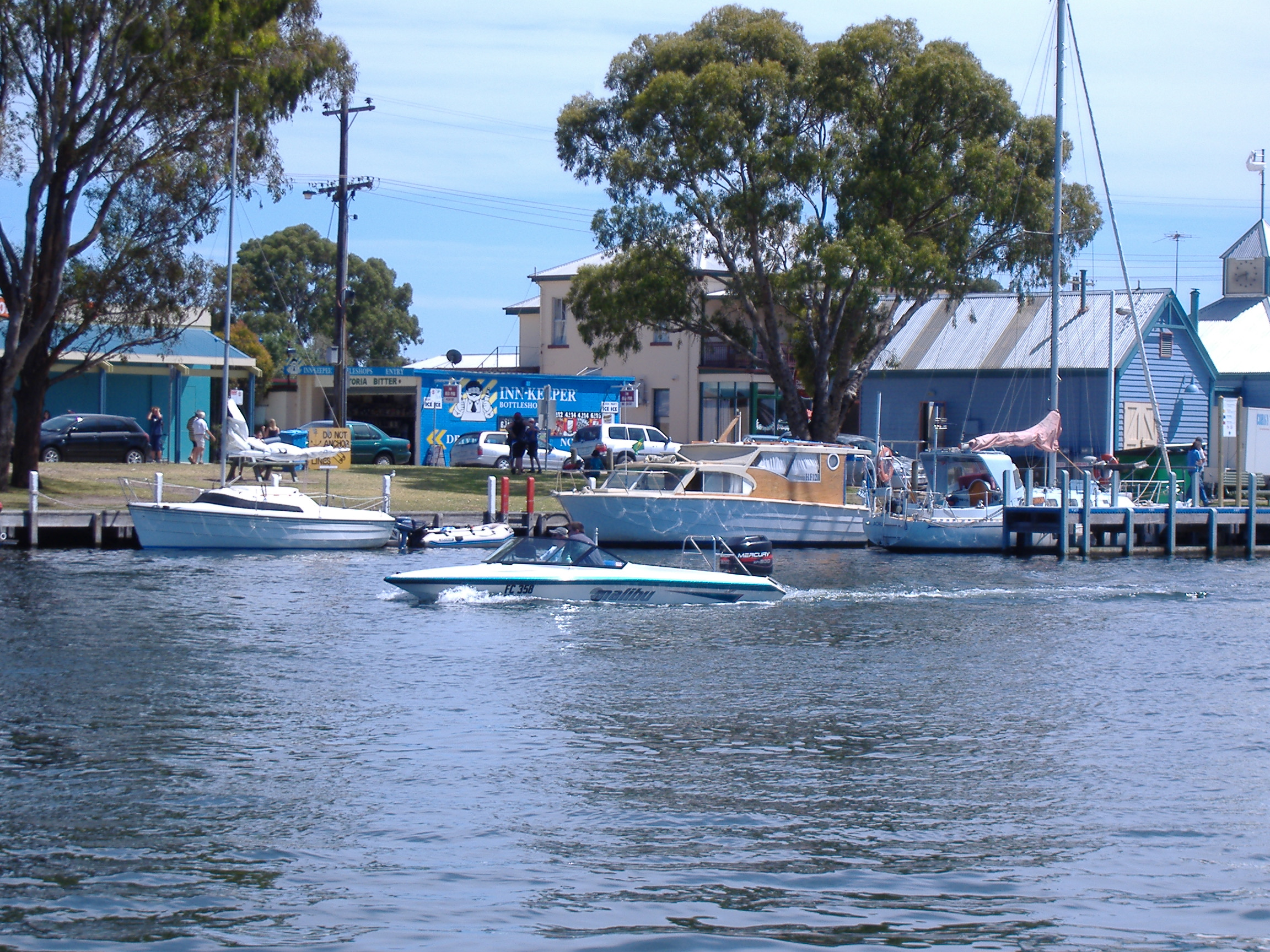
View of the foreshore at Paynesville, Victoria, Australia

Paynesville is a town in the Shire of East Gippsland, Victoria, Australia. At the 2021 census, Paynesville had a population of 3,636. The town is located 293 kilometres (182 mi) by road east of the state capital, Melbourne. It is known as the boating capital of Victoria.

== History ==
Paynesville was originally called Toonalook, which is an Aboriginal name for "place of many fish". The post office opened on 8 November 1879 as Toonalook and was renamed Paynesville in 1886 by the Dickson family, who still reside in the area.

== Raymond Island ==
Raymond Island is a small island accessible via the Raymond Island Ferry. The island is predominantly residential and is well known for its large koala population. It has been at the centre of occasional local debate over the construction of a bridge to allow for better access and further development.

== Sport ==
Paynesville is also well represented in the sporting arena, with sailing, bowls, tennis and netball clubs in the town, as well as a thriving local football and cricket club, the latter having won back to back Grand Finals in the Bairnsdale Cricket Association for 2007 and 2008. The town has an Australian Rules football team competing in the East Gippsland Football League. The team last won a premiership in 2013, the same year as the Hawthorn Hawks won their grand final in the AFL.

The Gippsland Lakes Yacht Club (GLYC), based in Paynesville, conducts sail training and sailability programs.

== Fishing ==
Paynesville is located on the eastern end of Lake Victoria, near Lake King, two of the larger Gippsland Lakes and is a good launching point for exploring the lakes. It provided access to some of the best fishing to be found in Victoria, however, fish stocks have been significantly depleted through over-fishing, nutrient run-off and destruction of sea-grass habitat.

== Tourism ==
Other tourist attractions in the area include:

- Paynesville Maritime Museum
- Raymond Island – well known locally for its large koala population.
- Ninety Mile Beach – accessible by boat from the town.
- The Lakes National Park
- Carey Baptist Grammar School Camp Toonalook

Nearby towns include Bairnsdale, Metung, Eagle Point, and Lakes Entrance.

== Education ==
The town is served by Paynesville Primary School and Paynesville Uniting Kindergarten

Carey Baptist Grammar School has an outdoor education camp near Paynesville called Camp Toonallook.
