= RIBO =

RIBO can stand for:

- Rotamah Island Bird Observatory

Ribo is the nickname of football player Rivaldo

ribo- is a combining form referring to the sugar ribose or some compound with a ribose component, including:

- ribonucleic acid (RNA)
- riboflavin = vitamin B_{2}
