= Golden Beach, Victoria =

Golden Beach
- Town
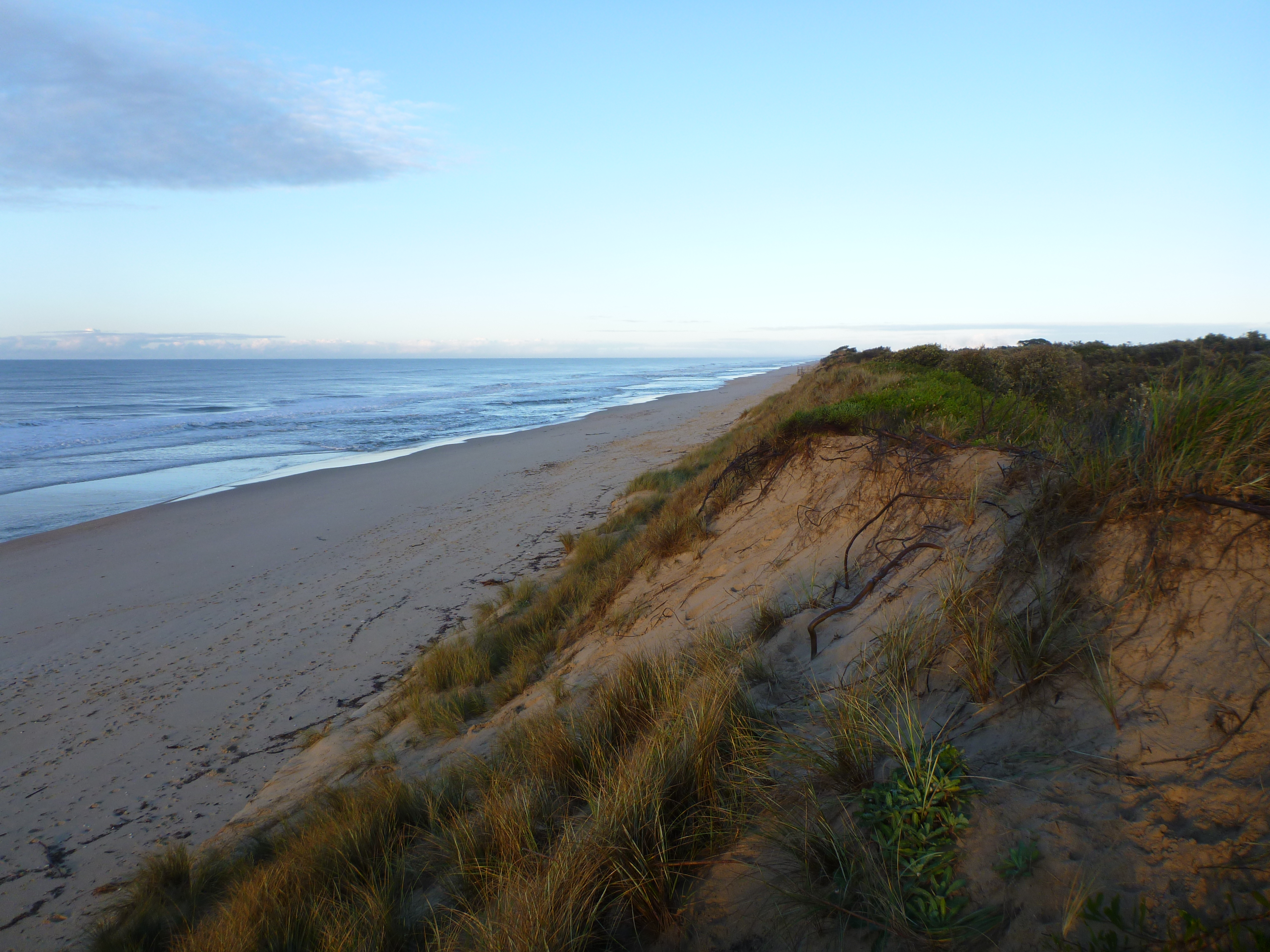

- Coordinates: 38°08′15″S 147°26′58″E
- Country: Australia
- State: Victoria
- LGA: Shire of Wellington
- Location: 248 km (154 mi) SE of Melbourne; 40 km (25 mi) SE of Sale; 85 km (53 mi) NE of Yarram

Government
  - State electorate: Gippsland South
  - Federal division: Gippsland

Population
  - Total: 293 (2016 census)
- Postcode: 3851

Golden Beach is a town situated on the Ninety Mile Beach in Gippsland Victoria. The beaches there offer long distances for walking and fishing, but are not patrolled. It has kangaroos on the golf course, a playground near the shops and a lookout deck near the ocean beach. There are many nearby wildlife reserves which are sanctuaries for water birds and other species. Seaspray and Loch Sport are nearby settlements which are slightly more developed with eating places and a caravan park.

Pastoralist William Letts purchased the land from the state government and it become known as Letts' beach. In the late 1940s, a developer changed the name from Letts' Beach to the more appealing Paradise Beach and Golden Beach. In the early 1950s the area was promoted as the "Surfers Paradise of Victoria". In 2011 there were 330 persons within the twin towns of Golden Beach and Paradise Beach.

In 2020, Wellington Shire Council initiated the compulsory acquisition of the remaining 750 undeveloped lots in a coastal subdivision between Paradise Beach and The Honeysuckles. The lots were originally sold between 1955 and 1969, attracting many buyers, including a significant number of migrants from Melbourne. The subdivision comprised approximately 11,800 small blocks, some of which were later identified as being located in flood-prone areas.
