= Banksia Swamp =

Banksia Swamp is a swamp in Victoria, Australia. It is located within the Gippsland Lakes complex.

The name refers to the plant genus Banksia, which grows in the area.
