= Ninety Mile Beach Marine National Park =

Protected area in Victoria, Australia

- IUCN category II (national park)
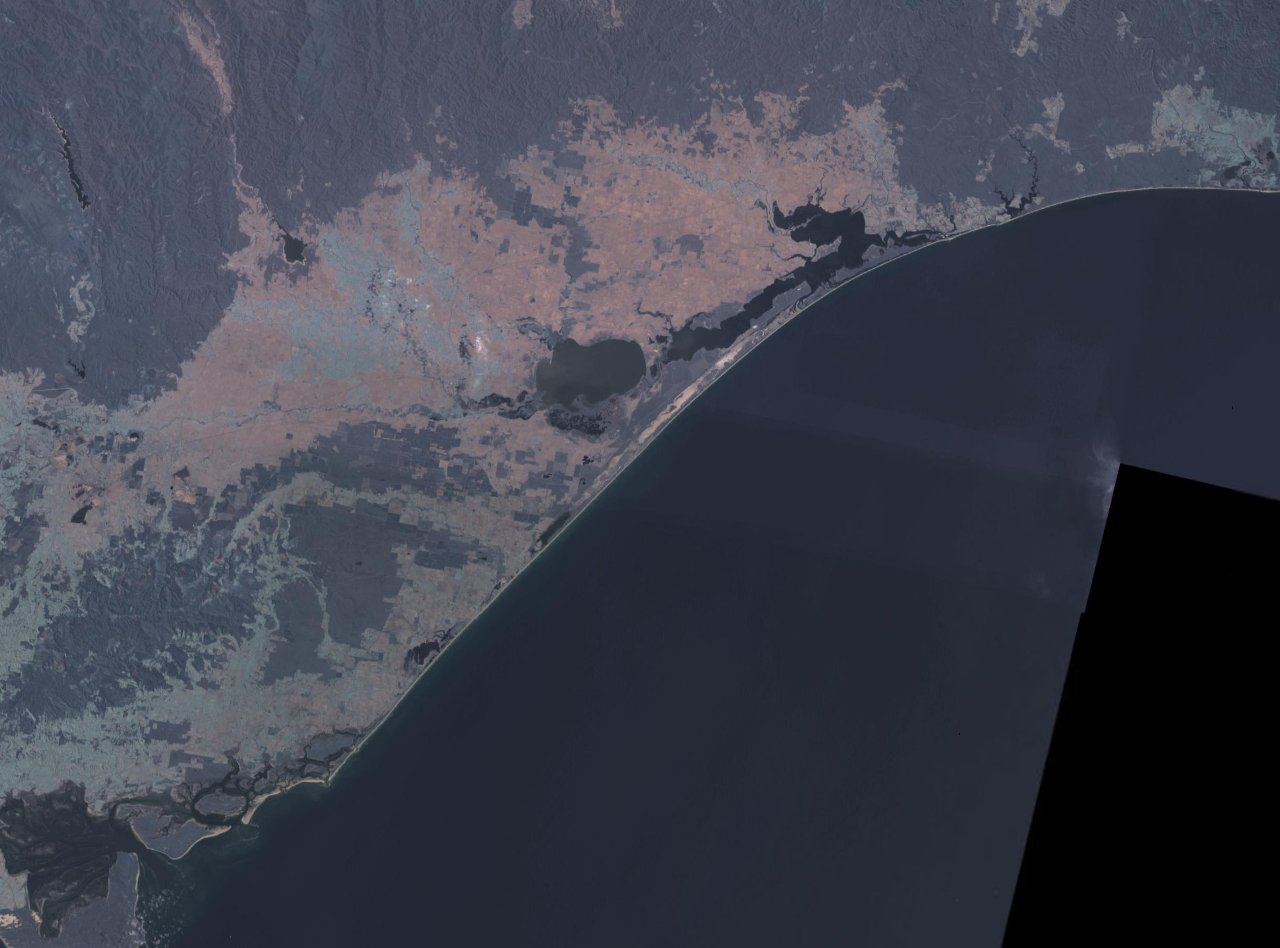
- False colour NASA landsat image of Ninety Mile Beach, the Gippsland Lakes, and national park

- Location within Victoria
- Location: Victoria
- Nearest city: Sale
- Coordinates: 38°25′S 147°11′E
- Area: 27.5 km^{2} (10.6 sq mi)
- Established: 16 November 2002
- Governing body: Parks Victoria
- Website: Official website

The Ninety Mile Beach Marine National Park is a protected marine national park in situated off the Gippsland coast in eastern Victoria, Australia. The 2,750-hectare (6,800-acre) marine park was gazetted on 16 November 2002 and is situated 30 kilometres (19 mi) south of Sale and located adjacent to the Gippsland Lakes Coastal Park.

== See also ==
- Protected areas of Victoria
- List of national parks of Australia
