= 1943 Seaspray RAAF incident =

1943 incident involving an RAAF plane

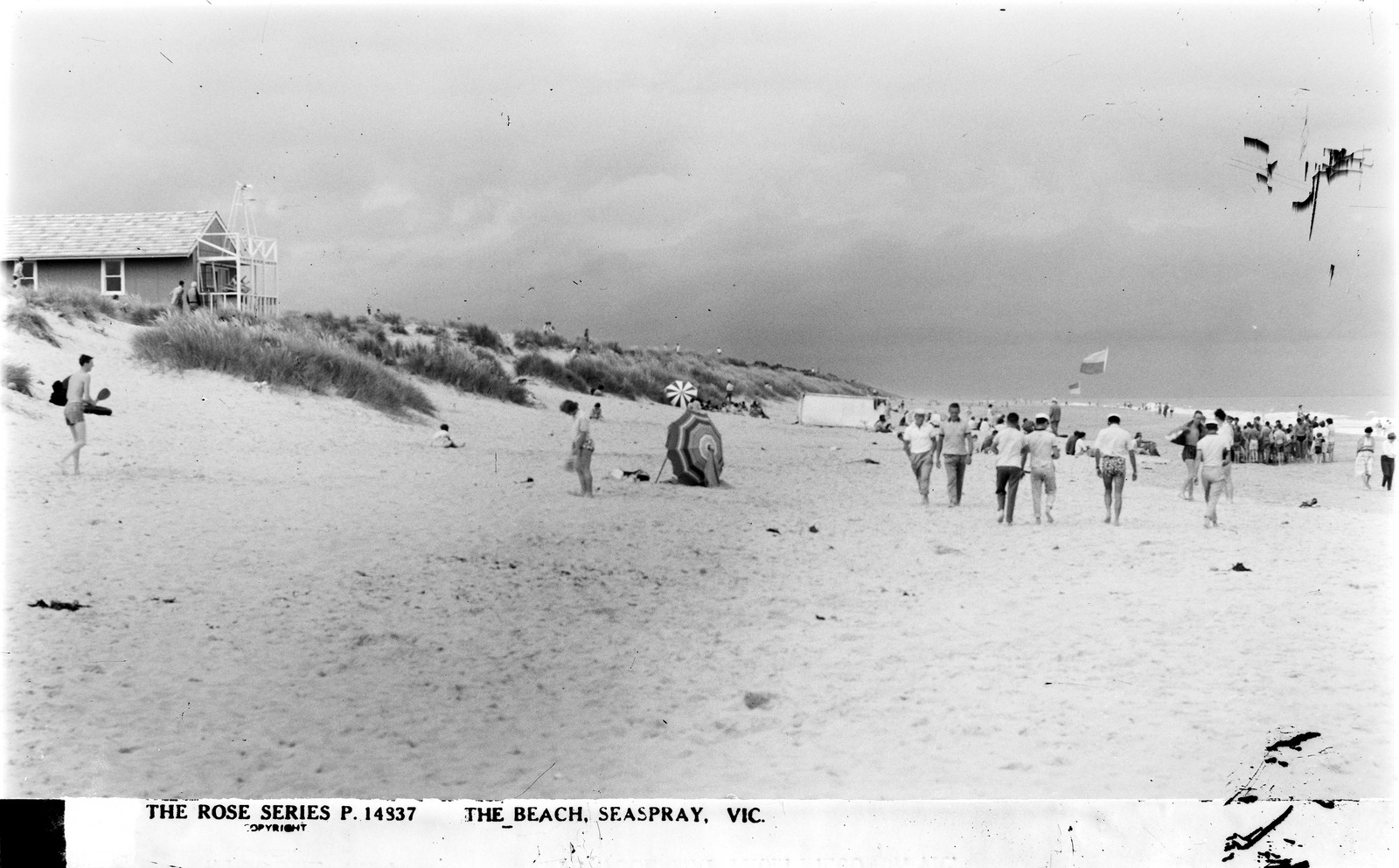
- Seaspray beach, circa 1920-1954
- Date: 27 December 1943
- Location: Seaspray, Victoria; 38°22′45.7″S 147°11′16.6″E
- Injuries: 7
- Arrests: 1
- Verdict: Acquitted

The 1943 Seaspray RAAF incident was an incident in Seaspray, Victoria on 27 December 1943 involving a Royal Australian Air Force plane that was flying off Seaspray Beach at a low level, towing a drogue target on a wire. After the target was released, the wire failed to wind in, injuring people on the beach. Seven people were injured, including two who had their legs amputated. These were Sale residents Hector Luxford and Noreen Cullen. People with more minor injuries included two children aged 16 and 14 who received injuries from sand propelled into the air.

The pilot involved in this incident, Lindsay White, was almost immediately placed under arrest, being put under constant guard. White was acquitted in a court-martial, saying that apart from feeling a "distinct tug", he was not aware of the injuries caused, and that he did not see the beach.

As for the survivors, Luxford and Cullen received compensation of £3000, however, this was not adequate to pay for the medical care they both required. Cullen, who was only 17 at the time of the incident, spent four months in hospital learning to walk again with prosthetics, and ultimately married Bill Waud in 1948, changing her name to Noreen Waud and having two children. A plaque has since been installed at the beach where the accident occurred. Noreen Waud died on 3 May 2021.
