= Ninety Mile Beach, Victoria =

Beach in Victoria, Australia

Ninety Mile
- Beach
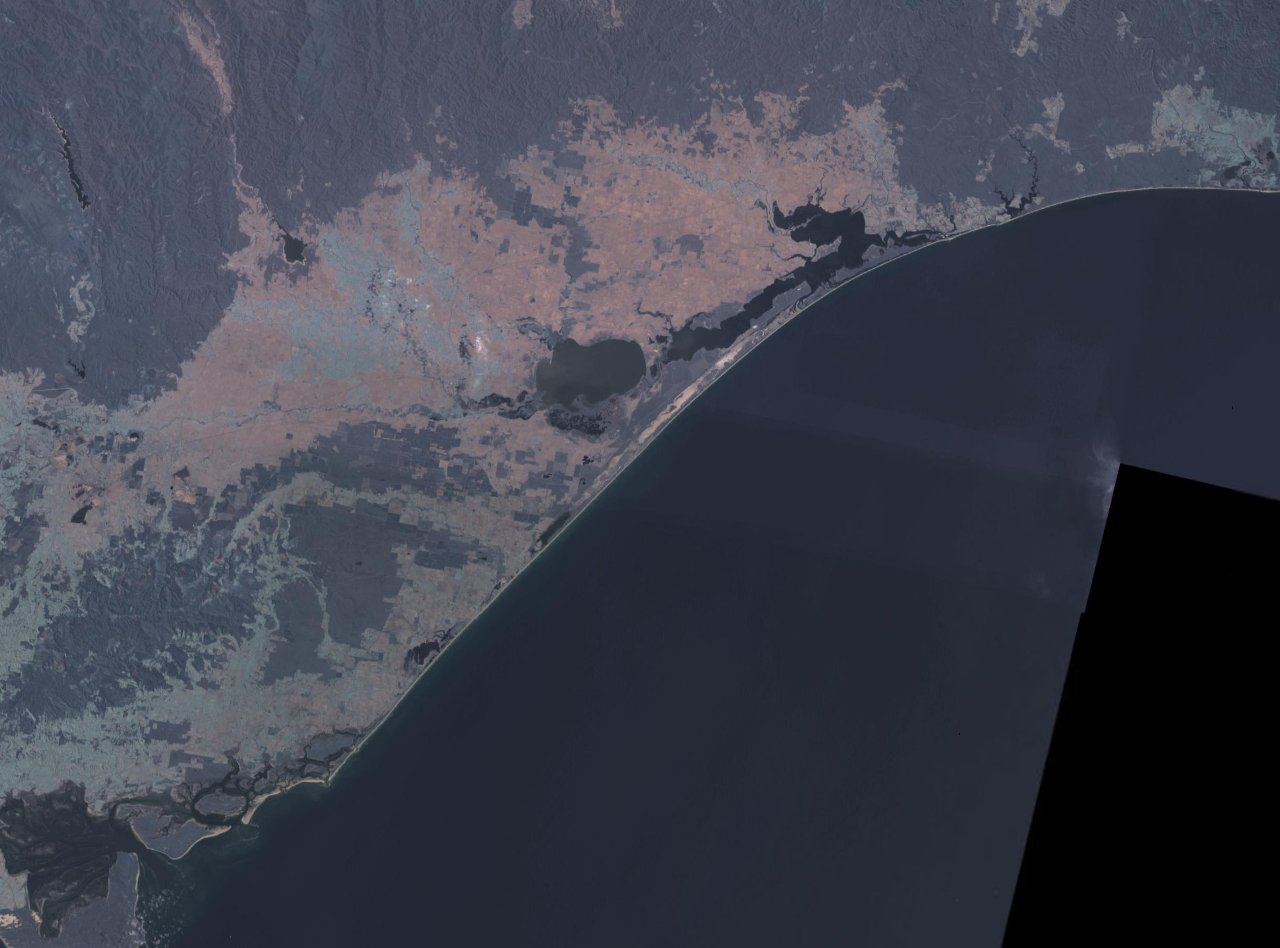
- False colour NASA landsat image of Ninety Mile Beach and the Gippsland Lakes

- Location within Victoria
- Coordinates: 38°18′8″S 147°17′15″E
- Location: East Gippsland, Australia

The Ninety Mile Beach is a sandy stretch of beach on the south-eastern coastline of the East Gippsland region of Victoria in Australia. The beach faces Bass Strait and backs the Gippsland Lakes. The beach is just over 151 kilometres (94 mi) in length, running north-eastward from a spit near Port Albert to the man-made channel at Lakes Entrance.

Behind the beach are long sandy dunes that separate the Gippsland Lakes from Bass Strait. The beach is an uninterrupted stretch of untamed coastline; it does not have any rocky headlands or platforms, and offshore there are only a few ribbons of reef which are periodically covered by sand.

In the northern section, the beach runs along a sandbar on what amounts to a series of tidal islands. Behind this are several large lakes and numerous shallow littoral lagoons. The three main lakes are Lake King, Lake Victoria and Lake Wellington, partially contained within The Lakes National Park.

== Location ==
The Ninety Mile Beach is located about 260 kilometres (160 mi) from Melbourne and can be reached from the South Gippsland Highway passing the coastal towns of McLoughlins Beach, Woodside, Seaspray, Golden Beach, and Loch Sport. The beach is located within the Gippsland Lakes Coastal Park, with the Ninety Mile Beach Marine National Park located off-shore.

== Tourism ==
Ninety Mile Beach attracts a large number of visitors each year and offers a wide variety of activities such as camping, picnicking, whale watching, and beach and water-based activities. The beach has golden sand, with crashing waves and a natural bush environment.

It is part of the Ninety Mile Beach Marine National Park, which covers 2,750 hectares and 5 kilometres (3.1 mi) of coastline, 30 kilometres (19 mi) south of Sale. There are basic camping facilities within the park at Emu Bight, as well as accommodation at Seaspray and Lakes Entrance.

Rotamah Island, which is part of the Lakes National Park, has a large bird observatory, and can be visited by boat from Paynesville, about 6 kilometres (3.7 mi) away.

Coastal towns of Woodside, Loch Sport, Seaspray, Golden Beach and Lakes Entrance are popular tourist towns, attracting large numbers of visitors during the warmer months. Woodside, Seaspray and Lakes Entrance have life saving beach patrols during the summer season.

Surf fishing is a key drawcard for the area, with main varieties of fish including snapper, flathead and gummy sharks. Port Albert, McLoughlins Beach, Lochsport and Lakes Entrance have jetties and temporary berthing facilities.

== Ecology ==
The beach's length ensures that the waves break too close to the beach for good surfing, and there are strong rip currents and cross-currents that make conditions rather hazardous. The local authorities recommend that anyone who wishes to swim should do so at Woodside, Seaspray and Lakes Entrance, which have life saving beach patrols during the summer season.

The beach is believed to be the fourth longest uninterrupted beach in the world, behind Praia do Cassino on the Brazilian southern coast, Padre Island on the US Gulf Coast and Eighty Mile Beach in Western Australia, which is actually 140 miles (230 km) long.

== Gallery ==
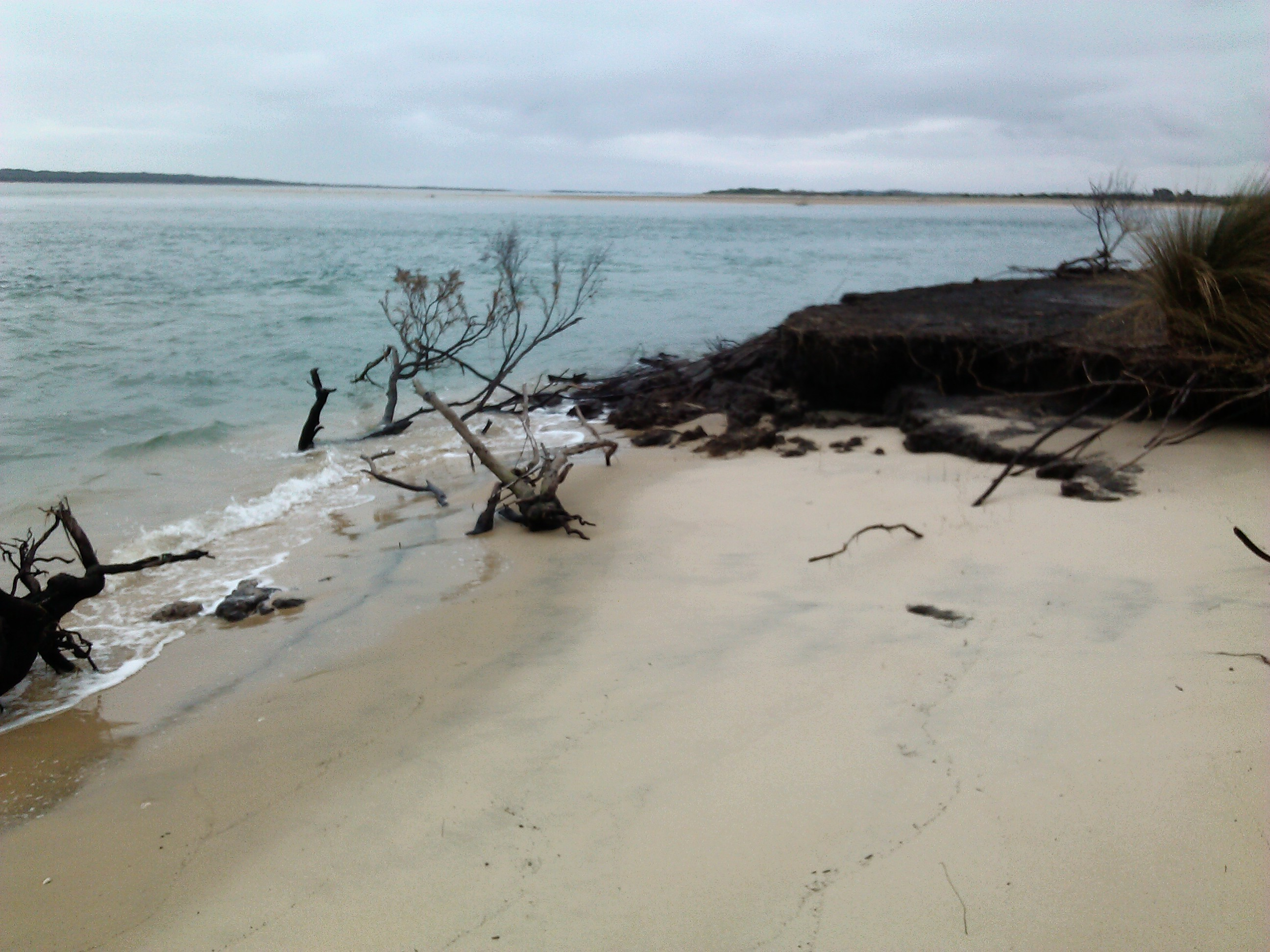
Western edge of Ninety Mile Beach

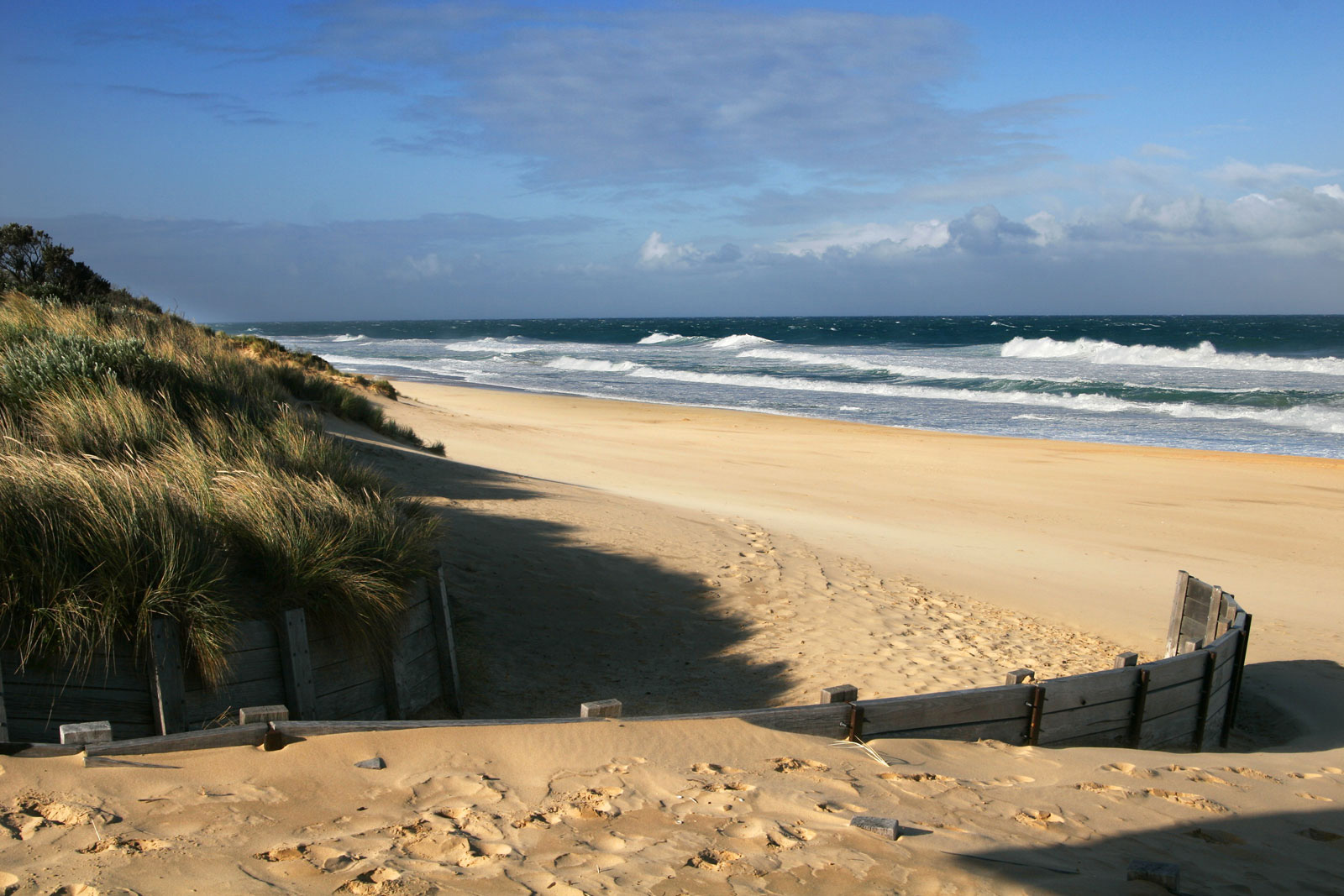
Ninety Mile Beach at Lakes Entrance

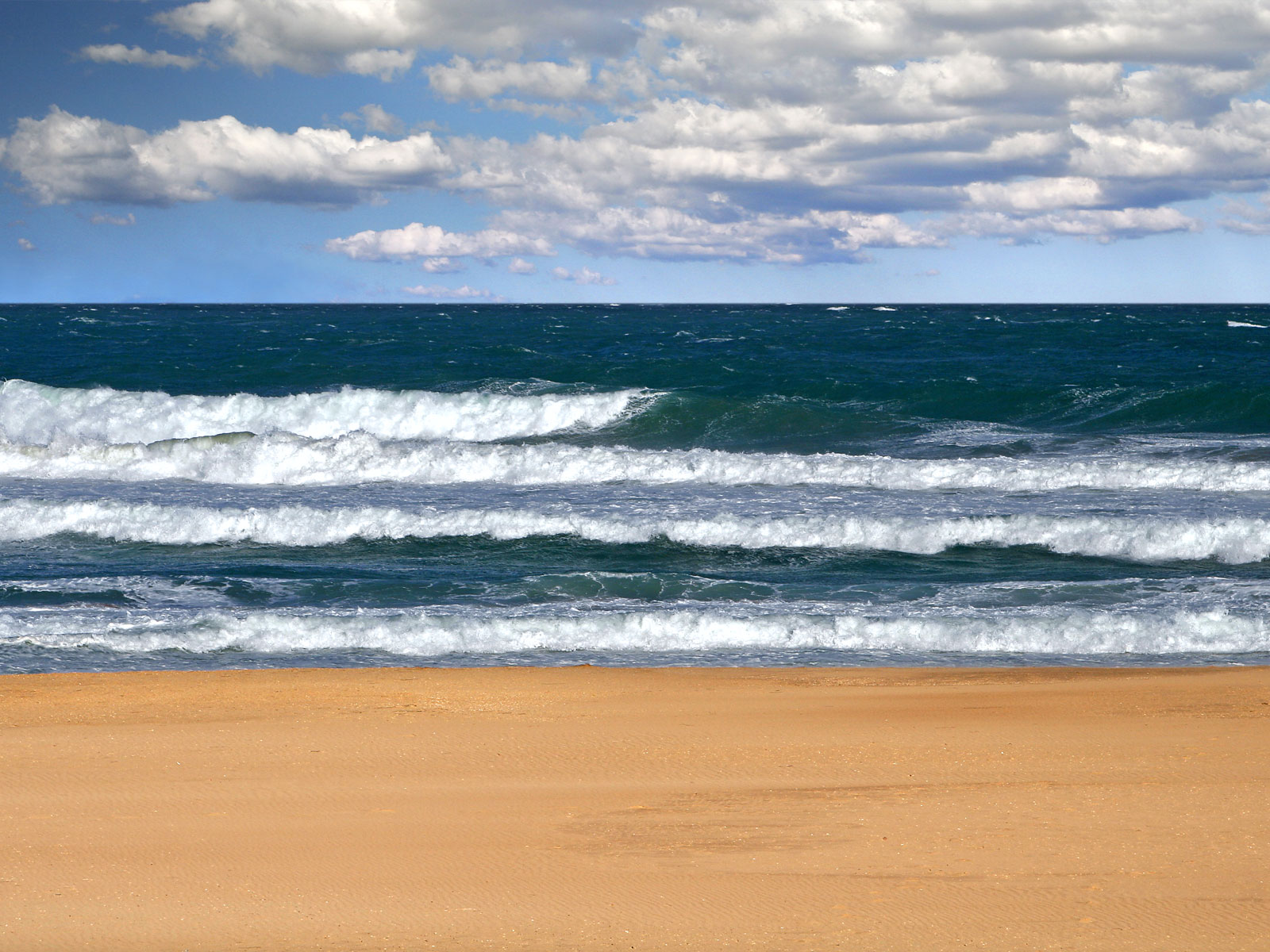
Ninety Mile Beach at Lakes Entrance

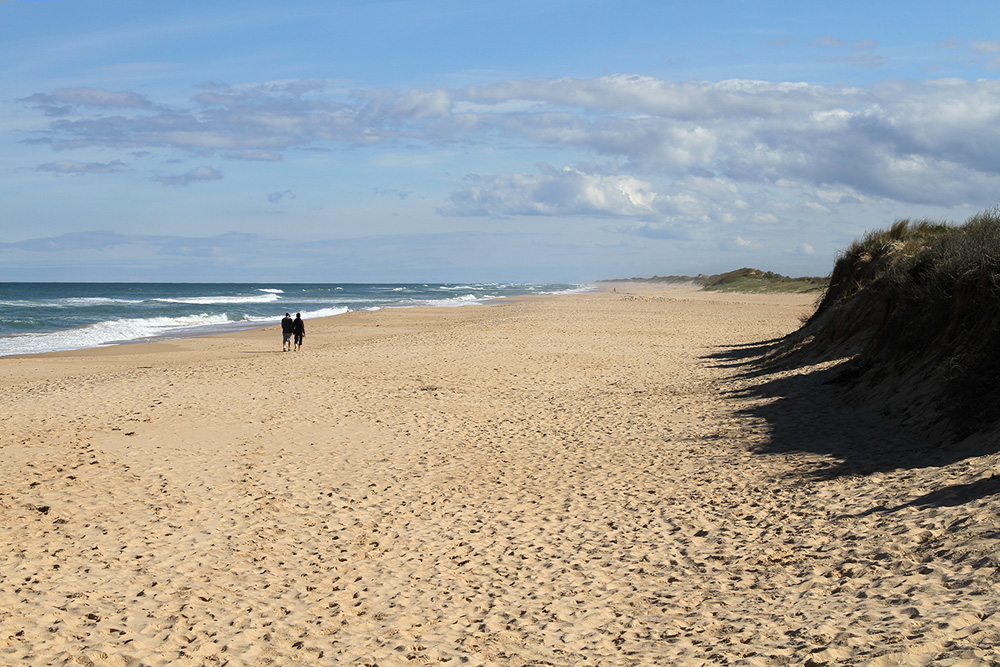
Ninety Mile Beach/ McLoughlins Beach at Seaspray
