= Loch Sport =

- Town
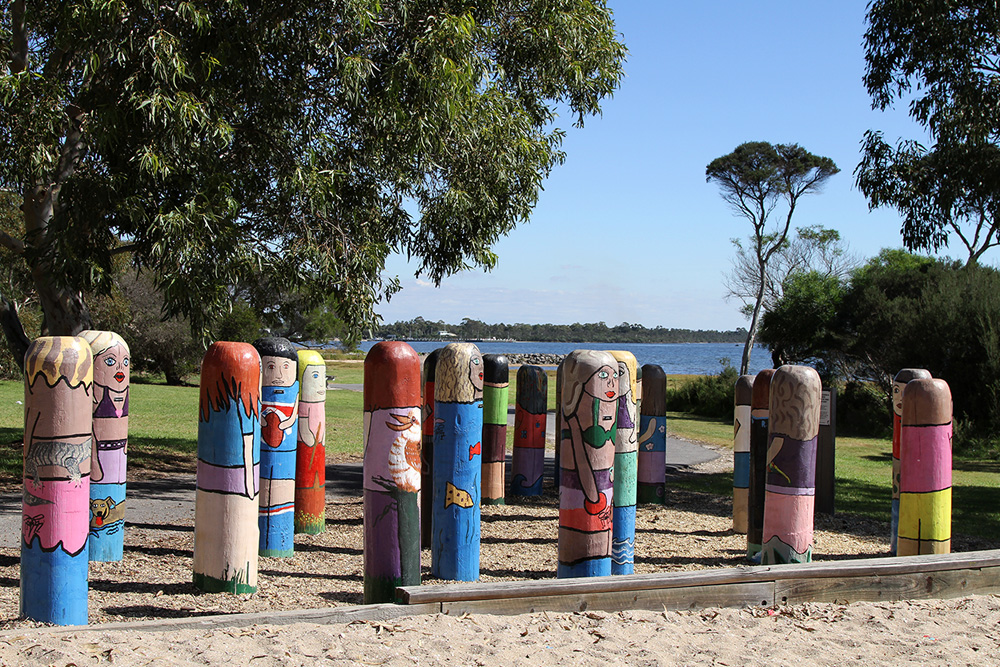
- Painted figures in the Lions Park on Lake Rd beside Lake Victoria

- Interactive map of Loch Sport
- Coordinates: 38°03′28″S 147°34′10″E
- Country: Australia
- State: Victoria
- LGA: Shire of Wellington
- Location: 269 km (167 mi) E of Melbourne; 56 km (35 mi) E of Sale; 28 km (17 mi) NE of Golden Beach

Government
  - State electorate: Gippsland South
  - Federal division: Gippsland

Population
  - Total: 1,020 (2021 census)
- Postcode: 3851

Loch Sport is a town situated on the Ninety Mile Beach and Lake Victoria in Central Gippsland, eastern Victoria, Australia. At the 2021 census, it had a permanent resident population of 1020. This is an increase of 206 from the 2016 census.

== History ==
Before European settlement, the area was used for hunting and fishing, and the collection of water yams and other vegetable food. Some of their descendants still live in regional townships. Aboriginal middens are still present.

In the 19th century British settlers cleared the land and began farming. Sandy soils dominate the flat coastal heath scrubland, which is surrounded by brackish lakes on the north and Bass Strait on the south. Later in the 19th century Melburnians discovered the recreational potential of the lakes—fishing, swimming and boating—and by the beginning of the 20th century Loch Sport was accessible via a dirt track, with plots of land surveyed for the nascent township. With increasing use of private cars, more people bought property in the town which, in 1980, was one of the last Victorian towns to receive electricity.

== Facilities ==
Loch Sport has a primary school, a bowls and tennis club, a caravan park, a marina, a pub, RSL club, boat club, service station with 24/7 fuel, post office and general store, hardware and garden centre, bakery, police station and supermarket, newly built in 2019. It also has a pharmacy, medical centre, real estate agent, a cafe, several massage therapists, and an art gallery. Golfers play at the course of the Loch Sport Golf Club on Spermwhale Head Road.

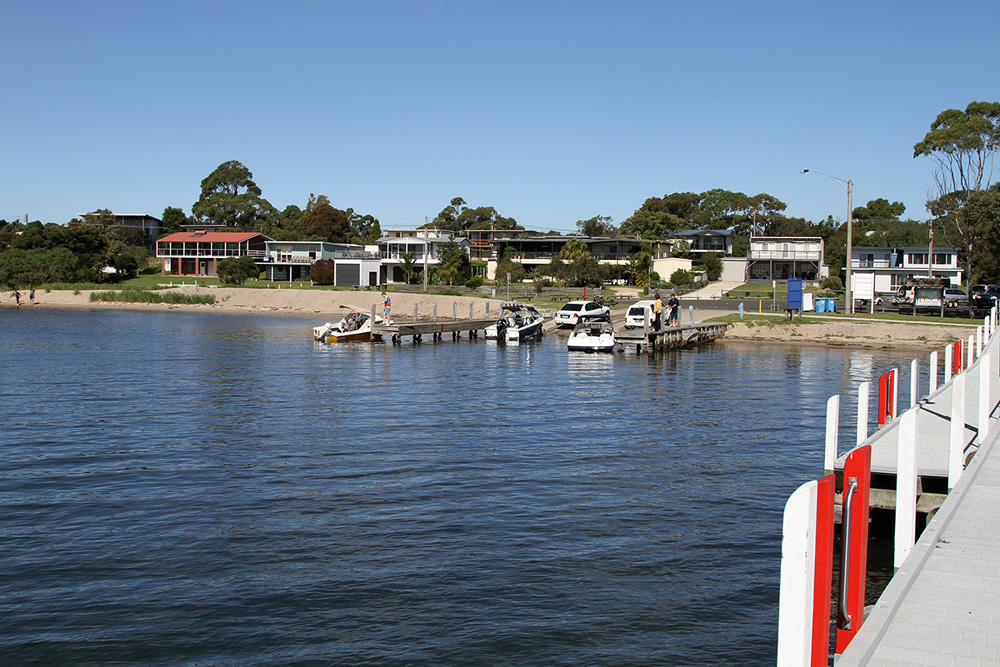
The boat launching ramps and houses on Victoria Parade

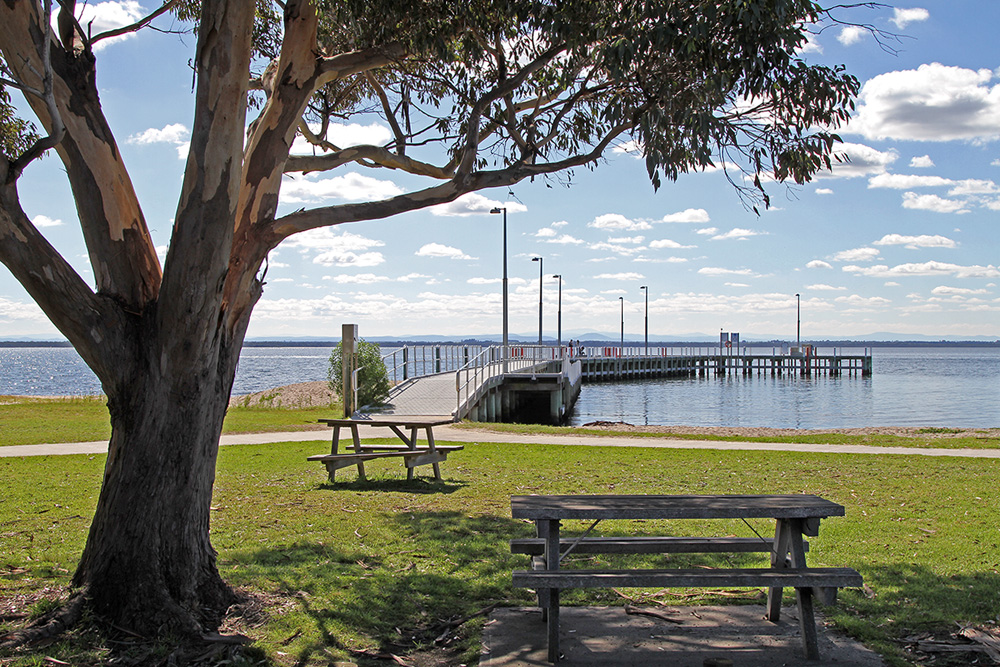
Looking north to the jetty and Lake Victoria

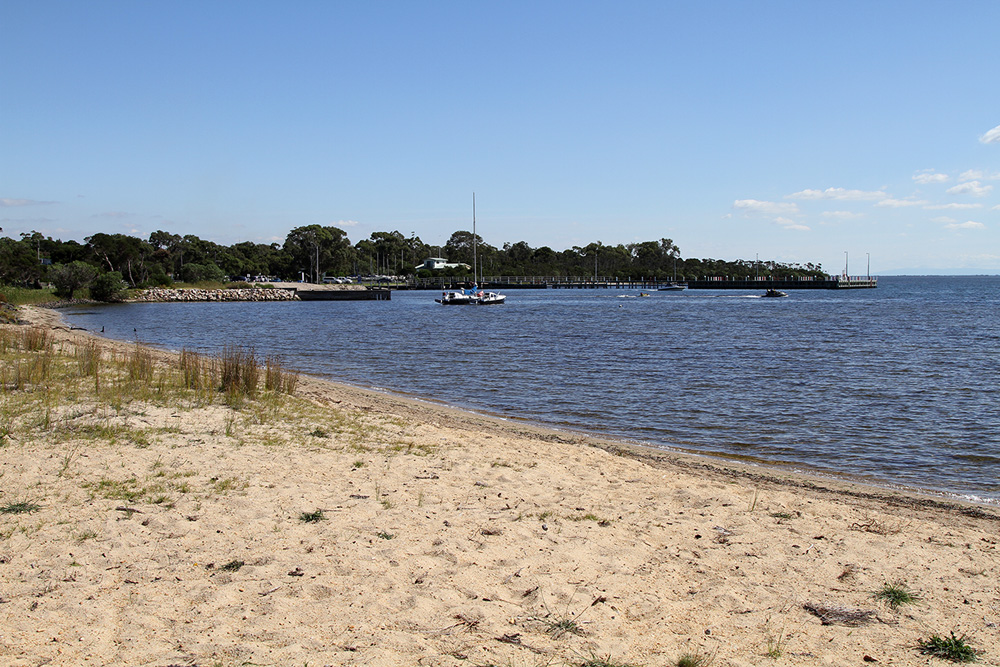
Looking west along the Lake Victoria shoreline towards the jetty

== Environment ==
Next to the township lies the 2,390-hectare (5,900-acre) Lakes National Park which supports populations of kangaroos, echidnas, koalas, emus and many other birds, and a wide variety of wildflowers. It is also known for its large salt marsh mosquitos.
