= The Lakes National Park =

National park in Victoria, Australia

- IUCN category II (national park)
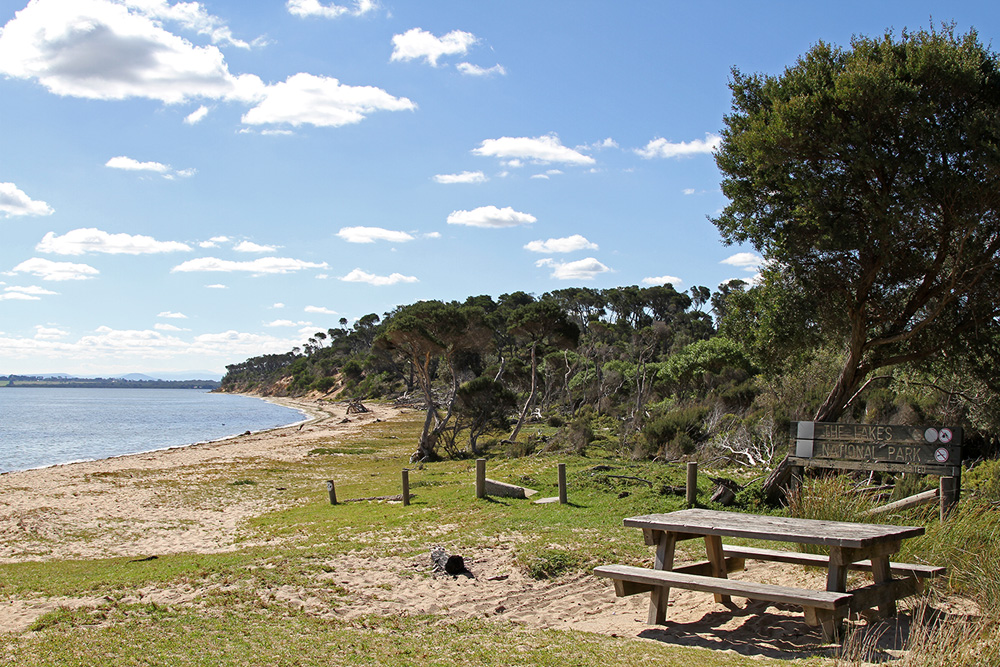
- The park boundary on Pelican Bay in Loch Sport

- Location within Victoria
- Location: Victoria
- Nearest city: Lakes Entrance
- Coordinates: 37°59′S 147°40′E
- Area: 2,390 ha (9.2 sq mi)
- Established: 1956
- Governing body: Parks Victoria jointly with the Gunaikurnai traditional owners'
- Website: Official website

The Lakes National Park is a national park in the East Gippsland region of Victoria, Australia. The national park is located approximately 245 km (152 miles) east of the capital city of Melbourne.

== Location and features ==
The 2,390-hectare (5,900-acre) park is set on the east shore of the Gippsland Lakes, fringed by the waters of Lake Victoria and Lake Reeve. The park includes Sperm Whale Head peninsula and Rotamah and Little Rotamah Islands. The park is managed by Parks Victoria jointly with the traditional owners, the Gunaikurnai.

An area of 1,451 hectares (3,590 acres) was initially set aside as a nature reserve in 1927, with the park proclaimed in 1956. Rotamah Island and Little Rotamah Island were added to the park in 1978.

== See also ==
- Gippsland Lakes Coastal Park
- Protected areas of Victoria
- List of national parks of Australia
