= Seaspray, Victoria =

Seaspray Victoria
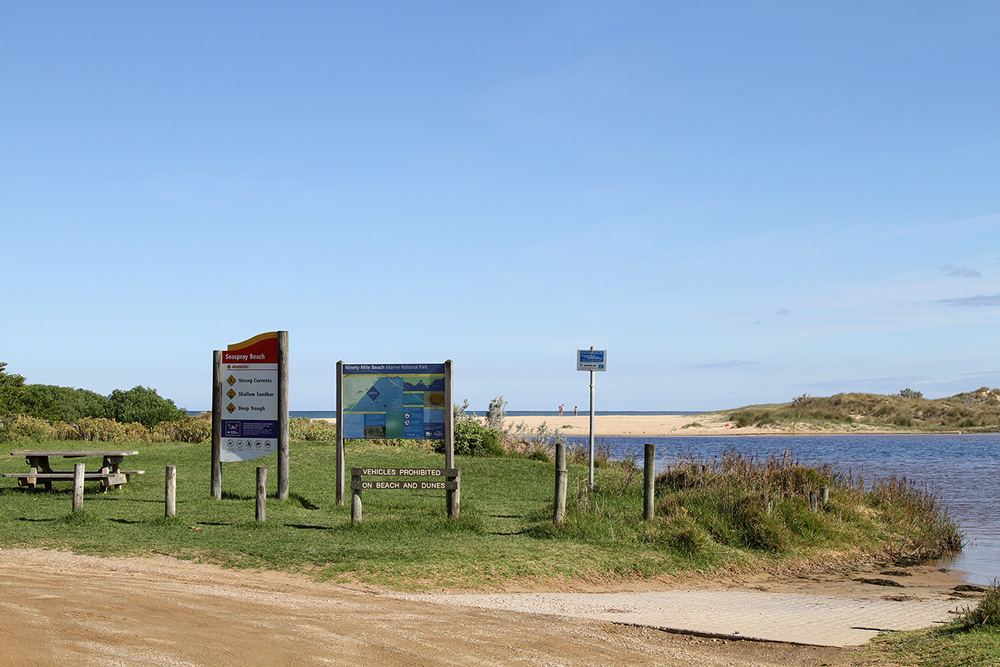
- Parks and water are prominent attractions

- Coordinates: 38°23′00″S 147°10′00″E
- Population: 322 (2016 census)
- Postcode(s): 3851
- Location: 242 km (150 mi) east of Melbourne; 34 km (21 mi) south of Sale; 62 km (39 mi) north east of Yarram
- LGA(s): Shire of Wellington
- County: Buln Buln
- State electorate(s): Gippsland East
- Federal division(s): Gippsland

Seaspray is a town in the Gippsland region of Victoria, Australia. The town is located on the Ninety Mile Beach, about 10 kilometres (6.2 mi) off the South Gippsland Highway, in the Shire of Wellington, 242 kilometres (150 mi) east of the state capital, Melbourne.

At the 2016 census, Seaspray had a population of 322.

Seaspray's main recreational features and tourism attractions focus around swimming, surfing and other watersports, as well as fishing on the Ninety Mile Beach. There is also fishing in the creek, walks, tennis, picnic and playground facilities, and regular markets.

In winter, people are likely to see southern right whales cavorting close to shore.

The town is home to a Surf Life Saving Club and hosts annual Surf Life Saving Carnivals. In 2015, the Seaspray Surf Life Saving Club underwent a $2.6 million rebuild after the previous club rooms had been badly damaged by violent storms in 2007. This first stage of the rebuild included better operational control facilities, a first-aid centre, equipment storage, and a function area with views across the town and beach. Future stages will include a patrol tower, extensive outside decking to expand the function area, and larger storage facilities.

== History ==
The original inhabitants of the area were the Gunaikurnai or Kurnai people, who have lived in the Gippsland area for over 20,000 years.

In 1943, seven people were injured at Seaspray Beach, two seriously, after a target being towed by an RAAF plane struck a number of people on the beach.

Seaspray hosted an overnight stop on the Great Victorian Bike Ride during its seventh running in 1990, and again in 2017.

== Gallery ==
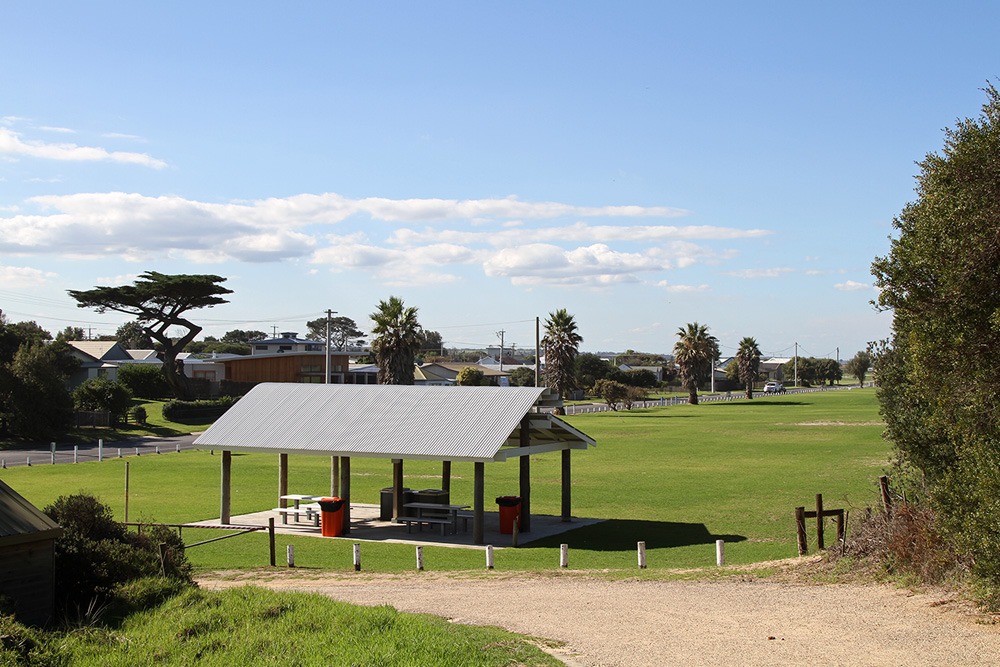
Looking across the Coastal Reserve to the town from near the Surf Life Saving Club (SLSC), 2016

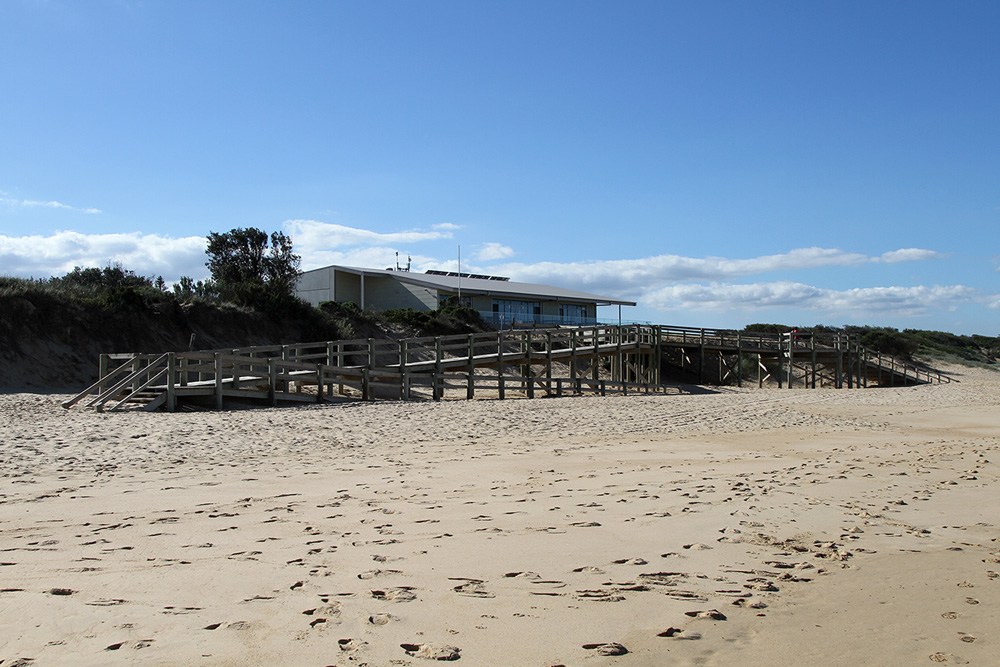
First stage rebuild of the SLSC, 2016

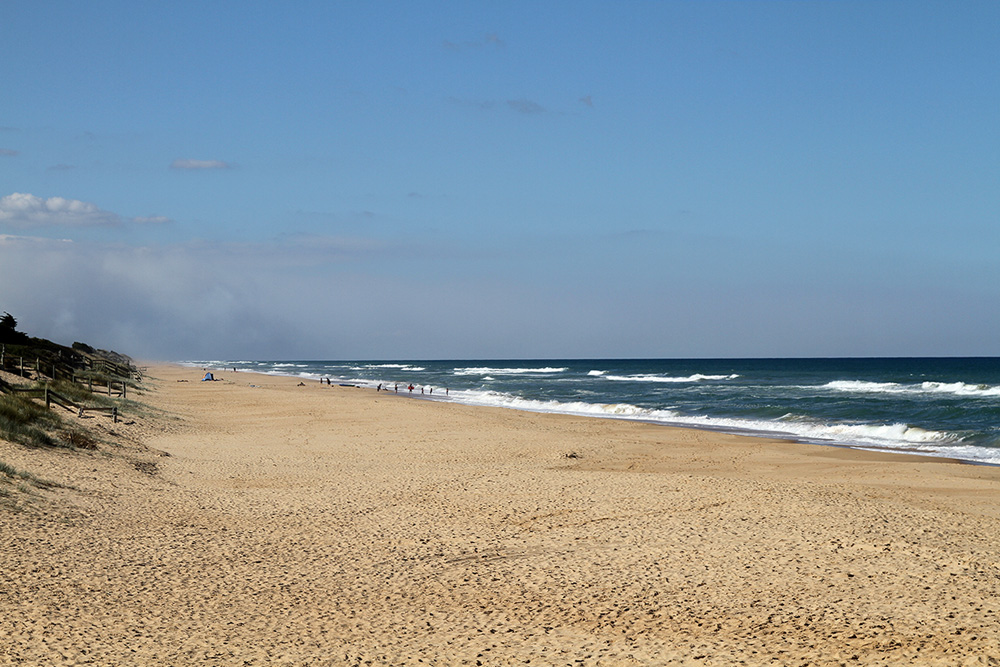
View north-east along the Ninety Mile Beach, 2016

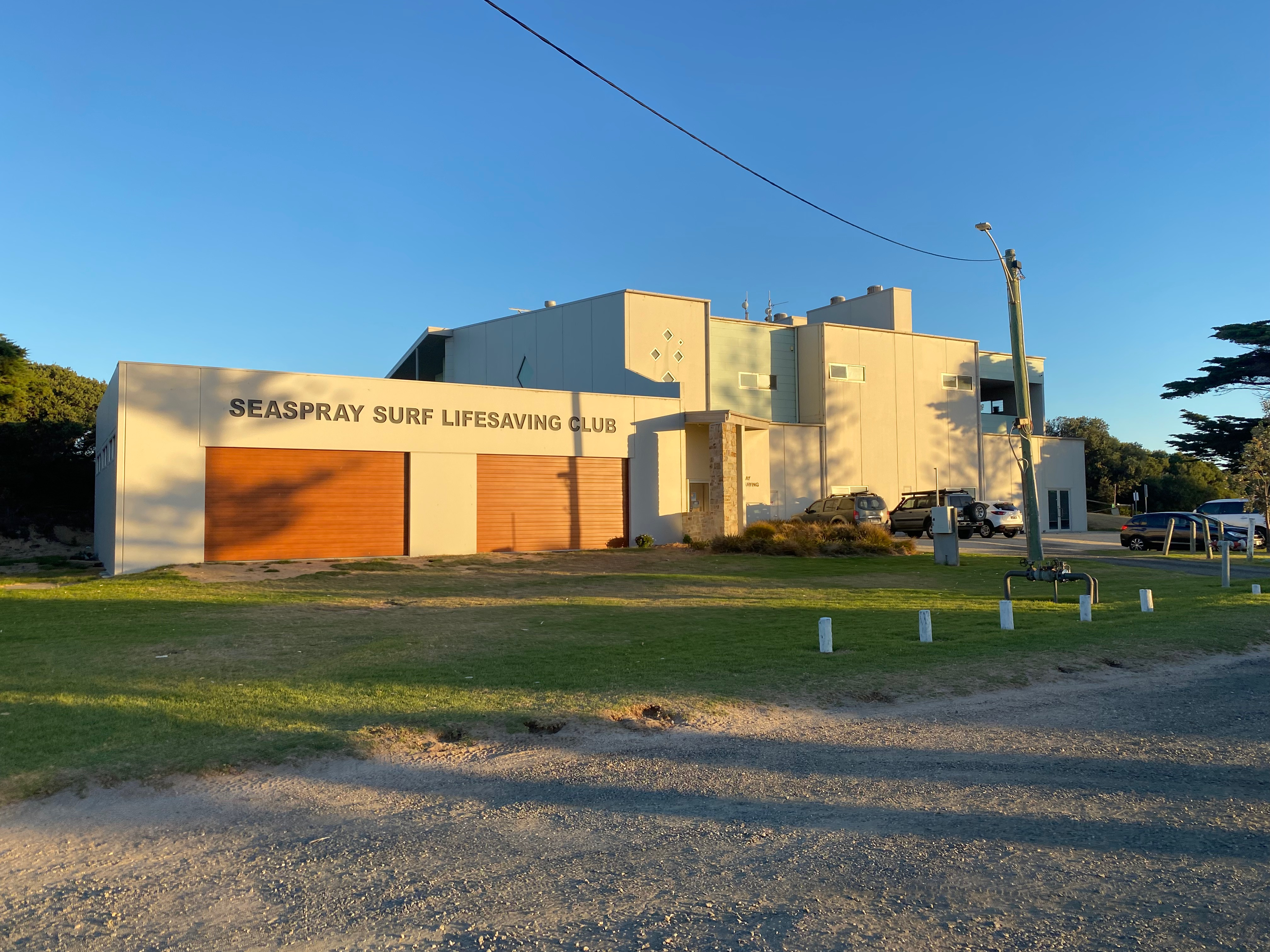
The SLSC as seen from the road, 2024

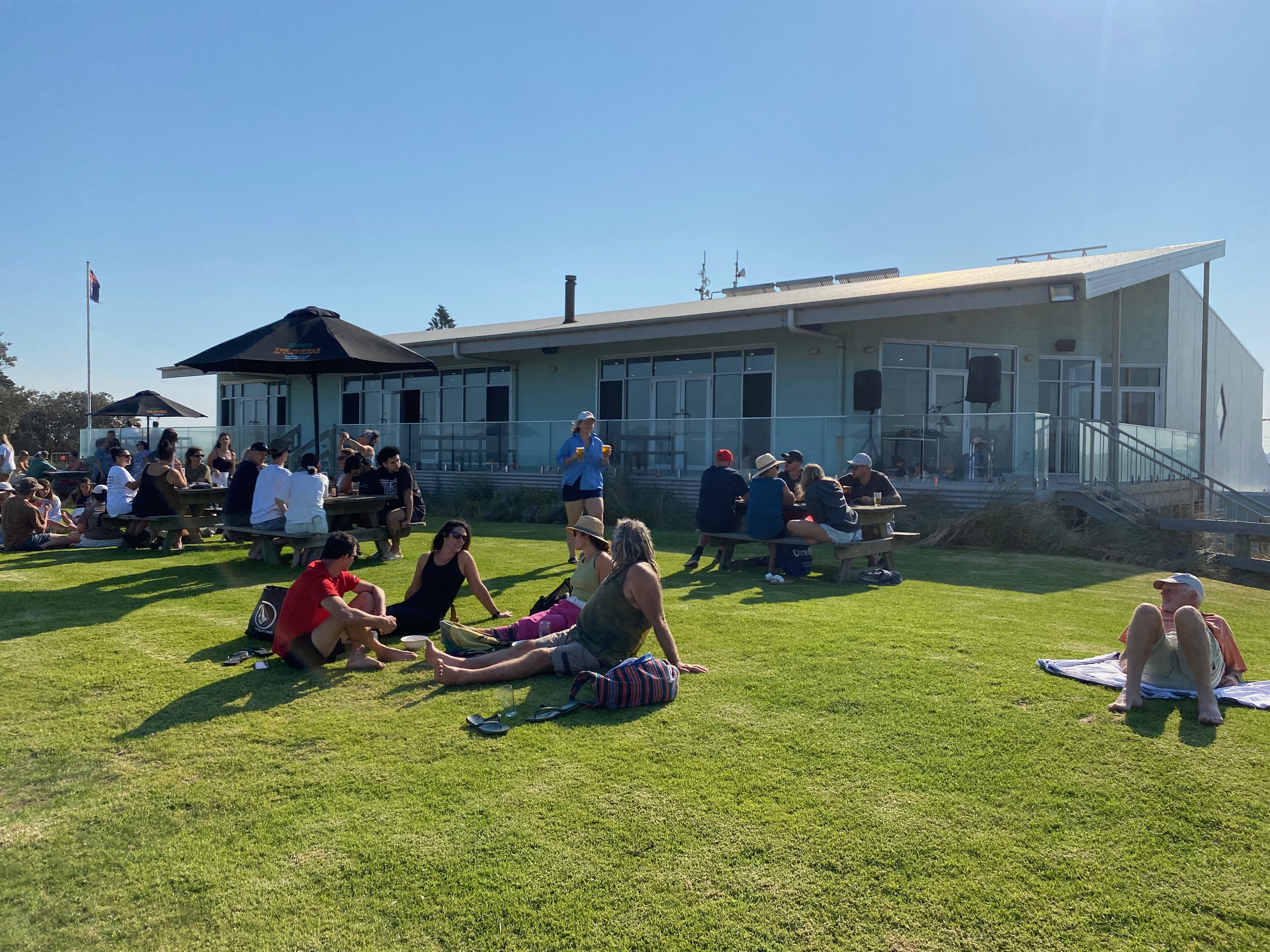
Outdoor seating at the SLSC, 2024
