= Lakes Entrance =

- Town
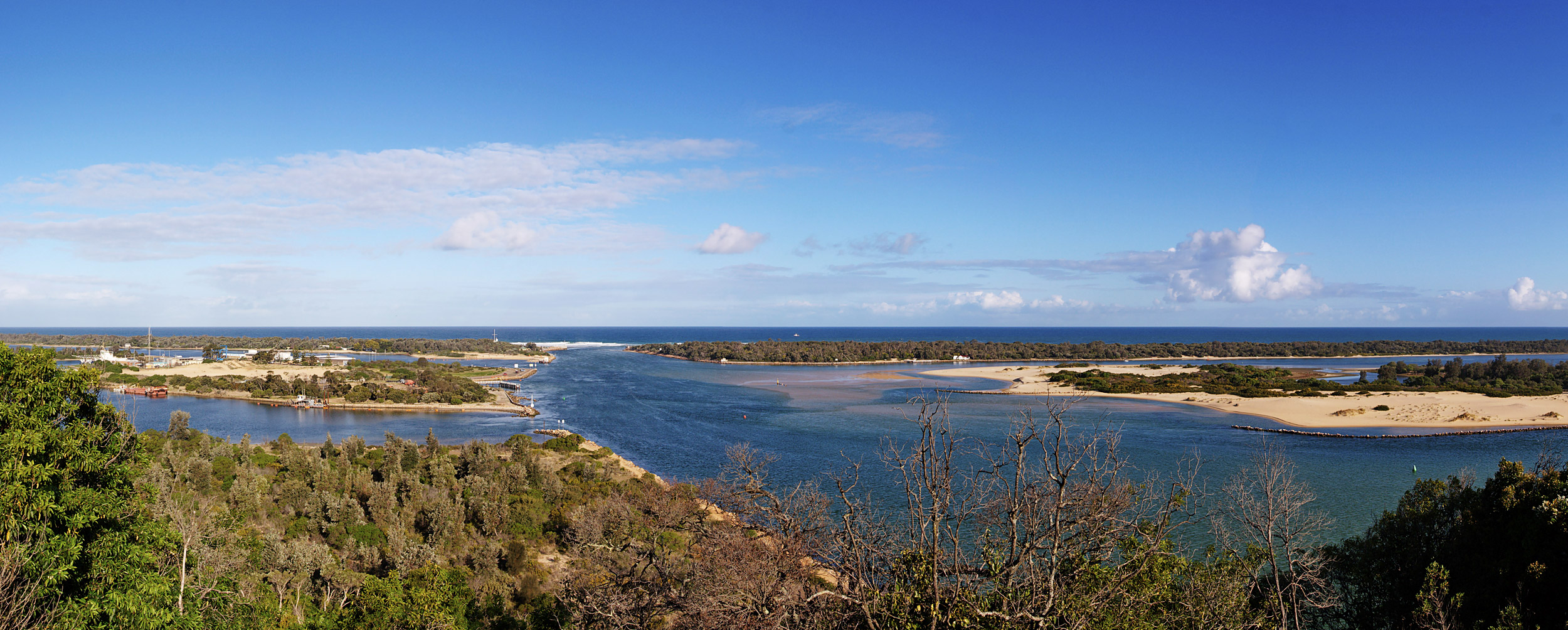
- Lakes Entrance. The town is on the left and "The Entrance" is near the centre

- Interactive map of Lakes Entrance
- Coordinates: 37°52′0″S 147°59′0″E
- Country: Australia
- State: Victoria
- LGA: Shire of East Gippsland
- Location: 321 km (199 mi) E of Melbourne; 40 km (25 mi) SE of Bairnsdale

Government
  - State electorate: Gippsland East
  - Federal division: Gippsland
- Elevation: 2 m (6.6 ft)

Population
  - Total: 5,145 (2021 census)
- Postcode: 3909
- Mean max temp: 19.7 °C (67.5 °F)
- Mean min temp: 10.3 °C (50.5 °F)
- Annual rainfall: 719.1 mm (28.31 in)

Lakes Entrance is a town in the Shire of East Gippsland, Victoria, Australia. It is situated approximately 320 kilometres (200 mi) east of Melbourne, near a managed, artificial channel connecting the Gippsland Lakes to Bass Strait. At the 2016 census, Lakes Entrance had a population of 4,810.

The township was originally named Cunninghame, the Post Office of that name opening on 5 February 1870. It was renamed Lakes Entrance on 1 January 1915.

== Description ==
The great Lakes Entrance, which lies almost at sea level, can be reached from Melbourne via Bairnsdale and the town of Kalimna to the north-west by a stretch of the Princes Highway, which snakes down and around a point protruding into the Gippsland Lakes known as "Jemmy's Point". Views of The Entrance and of the Lakes can be seen from various look-outs on Jemmy's Point. The Princes Highway leaves the north-east side of the town through hilly countryside towards Nowa Nowa and Orbost. It has the largest number of inland waterways in the southern hemisphere. The ninety-mile beach is a big tourist attraction and the various national parks of Gippsland touch the coastline of Lakes Entrance. Two of the most scenic driving routes are also a part of this region, the Great Alpine Road and The Sydney to Melbourne Coastal Drive.

Lakes Entrance is predominantly a fishing and tourism-driven town; the main beach front is a harbour for commercial fishing and recreational watersport operations. The surf beach is patrolled by the Lakes Entrance Surf Life Saving Club (SLSC) between November and March every summer, with lifeguard patrols from late December to late January. The waterfront is populated by the fishing fleet and two floating restaurants. The town's main residential areas lie farther inland.

Lakes Entrance has a number of camping and caravan parks, and free camping spots in Colquhoun State Forest.

It can be reached from Melbourne on a train to Bairnsdale, followed by an approximately 35 minute connecting bus ride.

Nearby major towns include Bairnsdale and Orbost. Lakes Entrance falls within the Shire of East Gippsland. Other towns include Swan Reach, Johnsonville, Kalimna, Nicholson, Metung and Lake Tyers.

== Population ==
According to the 2016 census of Population, there were 4,810 people in Lakes Entrance.

- Aboriginal and Torres Strait Islander people made up 3.8% of the population.
- 75.9% of people were born in Australia. The next most common country of birth was England at 3.9%.
- 84.1% of people spoke only English at home.
- The most common responses for religion were No Religion 32.5%, Catholic 20.6% and Anglican 15.9%.

== Climate ==
Climate data for Lakes Entrance (Eastern Beach Road) (2006–2022)
| Month | Jan | Feb | Mar | Apr | May | Jun | Jul | Aug | Sep | Oct | Nov | Dec | Year |
|---|---|---|---|---|---|---|---|---|---|---|---|---|---|
| Record high °C (°F) | 44.6 (112.3) | 46.4 (115.5) | 39.0 (102.2) | 34.4 (93.9) | 29.1 (84.4) | 23.0 (73.4) | 23.4 (74.1) | 26.4 (79.5) | 35.7 (96.3) | 35.4 (95.7) | 41.6 (106.9) | 42.4 (108.3) | 46.4 (115.5) |
| Mean daily maximum °C (°F) | 24.4 (75.9) | 23.6 (74.5) | 22.6 (72.7) | 20.2 (68.4) | 17.9 (64.2) | 15.1 (59.2) | 15.4 (59.7) | 16.0 (60.8) | 18.1 (64.6) | 19.6 (67.3) | 21.2 (70.2) | 22.9 (73.2) | 19.7 (67.5) |
| Mean daily minimum °C (°F) | 15.2 (59.4) | 14.8 (58.6) | 13.5 (56.3) | 11.1 (52.0) | 8.5 (47.3) | 6.3 (43.3) | 5.9 (42.6) | 6.4 (43.5) | 7.7 (45.9) | 9.6 (49.3) | 11.6 (52.9) | 13.2 (55.8) | 10.3 (50.5) |
| Record low °C (°F) | 6.5 (43.7) | 8.0 (46.4) | 7.0 (44.6) | 4.5 (40.1) | 0.0 (32.0) | −0.8 (30.6) | −2.4 (27.7) | −2.0 (28.4) | 0.4 (32.7) | 2.5 (36.5) | 3.8 (38.8) | 5.9 (42.6) | −2.4 (27.7) |
| Average precipitation mm (inches) | 46.7 (1.84) | 53.0 (2.09) | 63.6 (2.50) | 67.1 (2.64) | 41.8 (1.65) | 86.9 (3.42) | 47.5 (1.87) | 58.6 (2.31) | 50.0 (1.97) | 59.9 (2.36) | 75.6 (2.98) | 67.1 (2.64) | 719.1 (28.31) |
| Average precipitation days | 8.1 | 8.1 | 9.3 | 9.1 | 8.6 | 11.5 | 12.0 | 11.8 | 10.0 | 10.4 | 10.3 | 10.1 | 119.3 |
Source: (2006–)

== Sports ==
The town has an Australian rules football team competing in the East Gippsland Football League.

The town is home to a hockey club in the East Gippsland Hockey Association, although the club still plays under the name of its original home town, Swan Reach.

Golfers play at the course of the Lakes Entrance Golf Club on Golf Links Road, which has 18 holes.

== Gallery ==
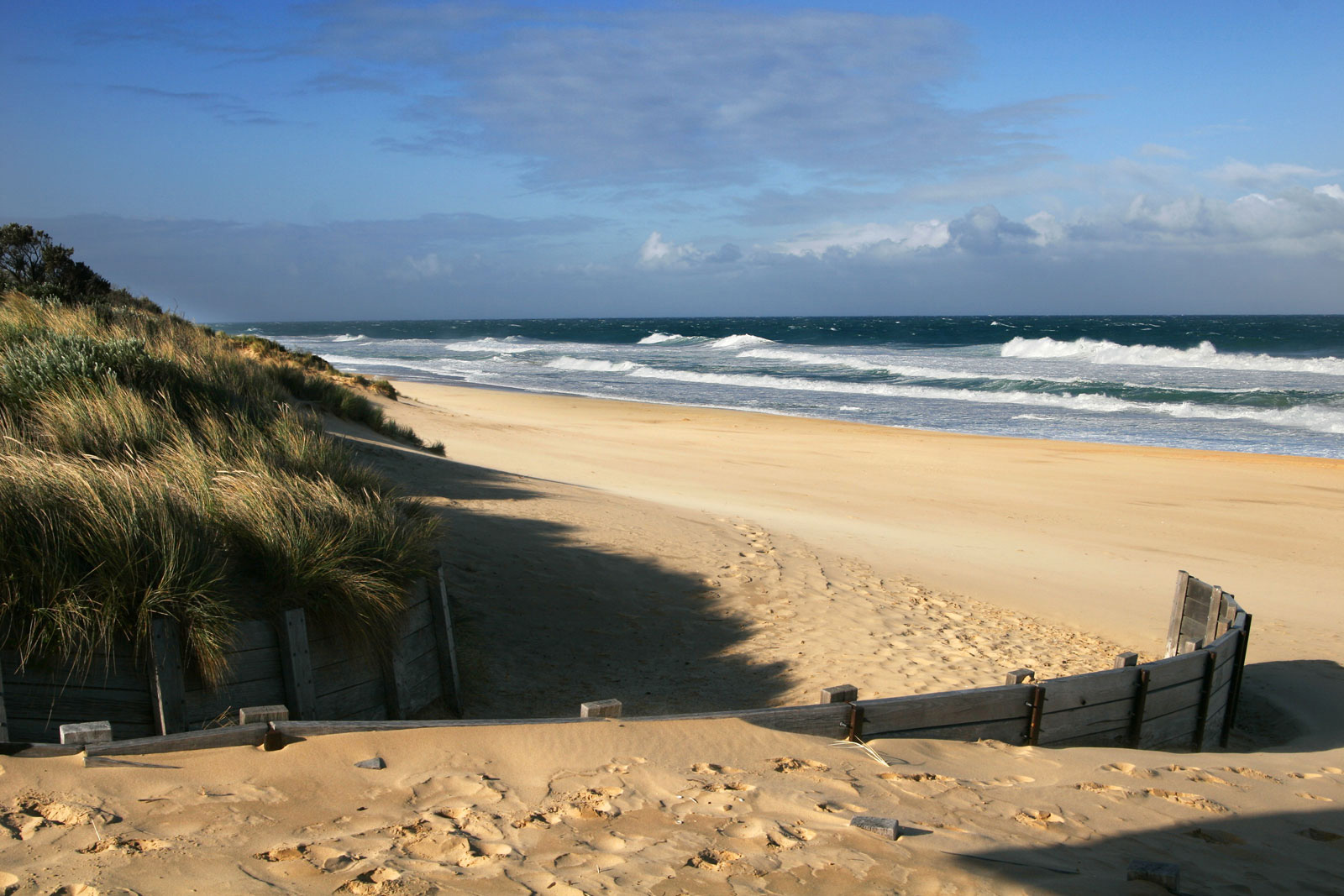
90 mile beach

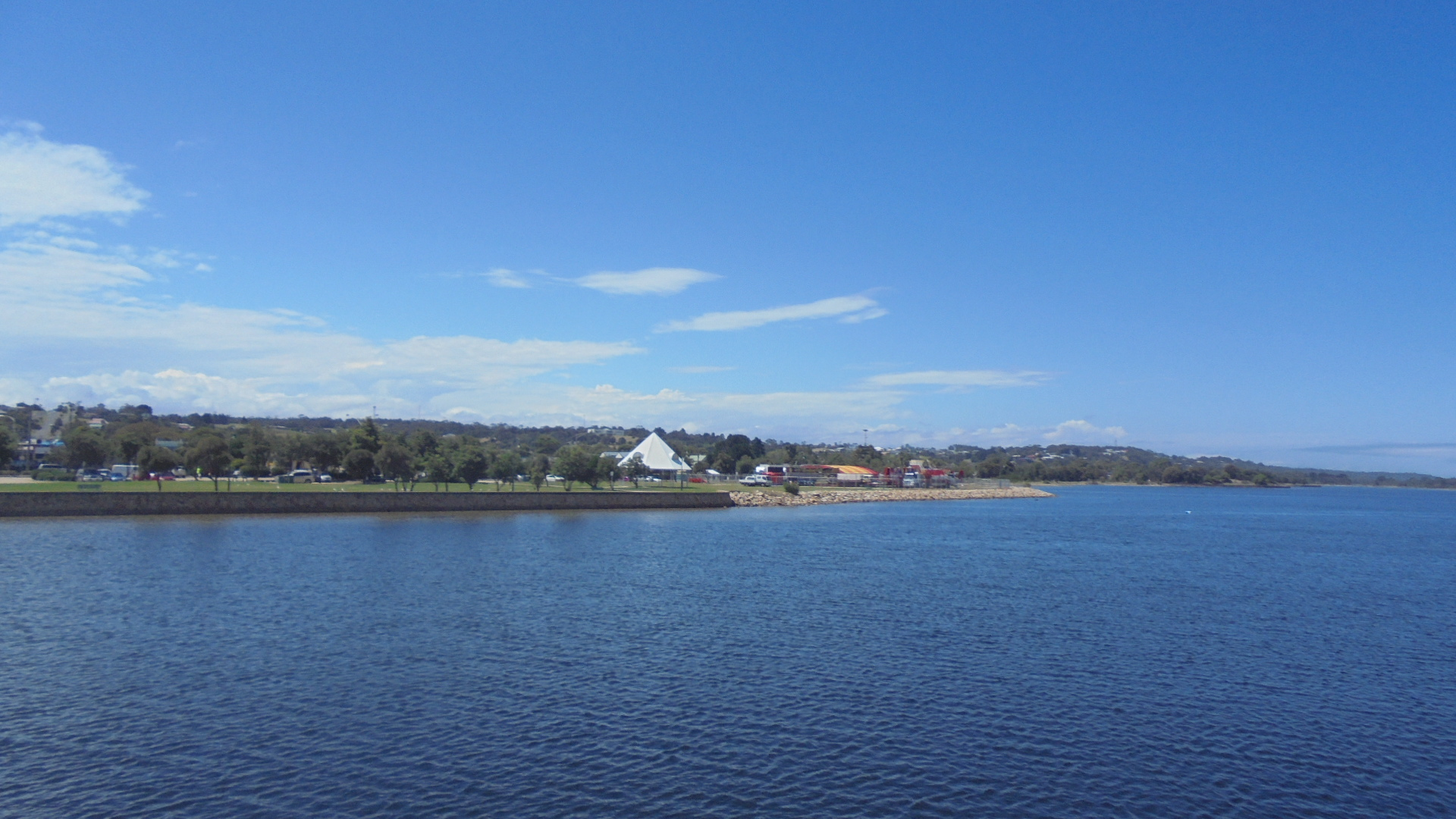
Cunningham Arm

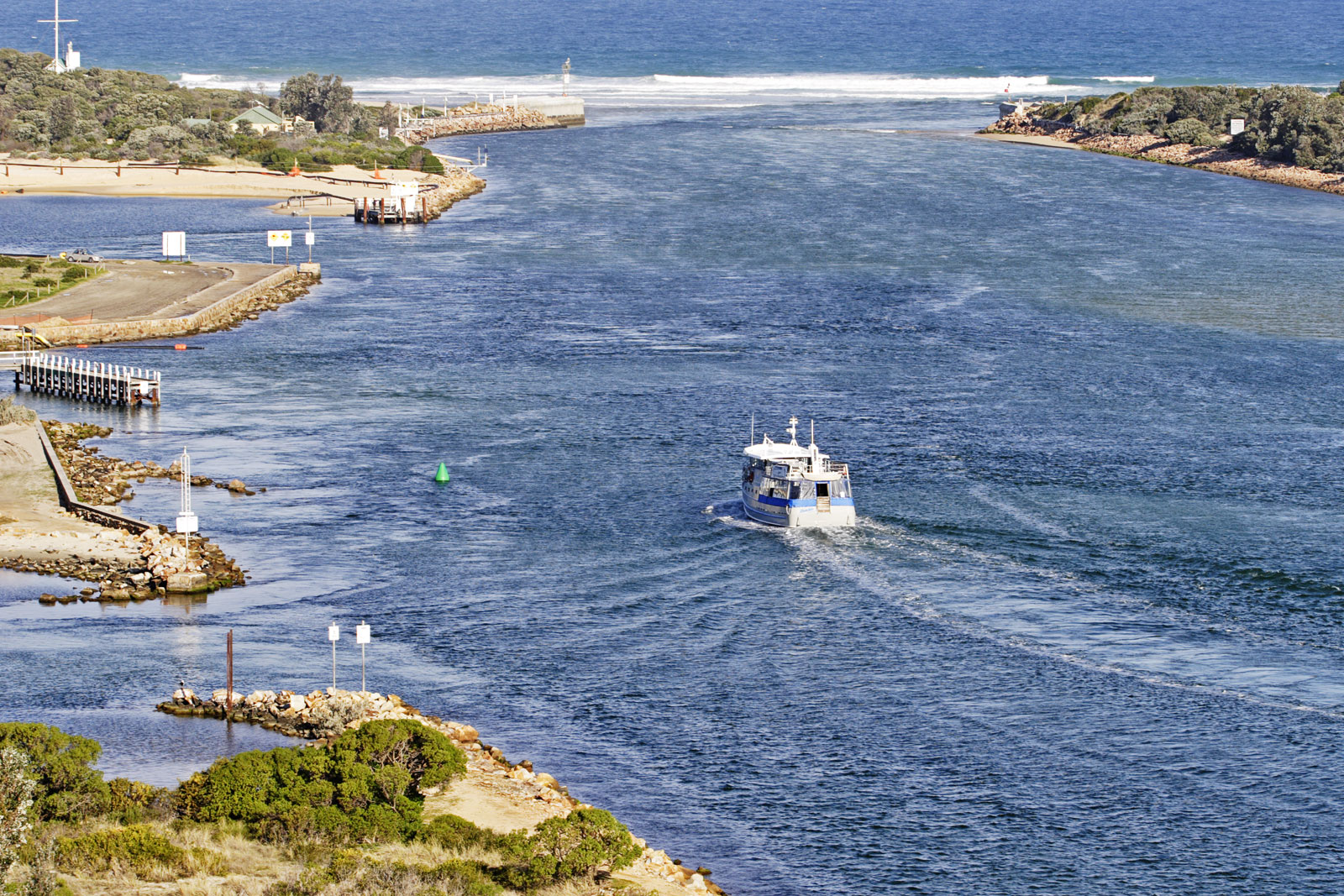
The Entrance to Gippsland Lakes at Lakes Entrance

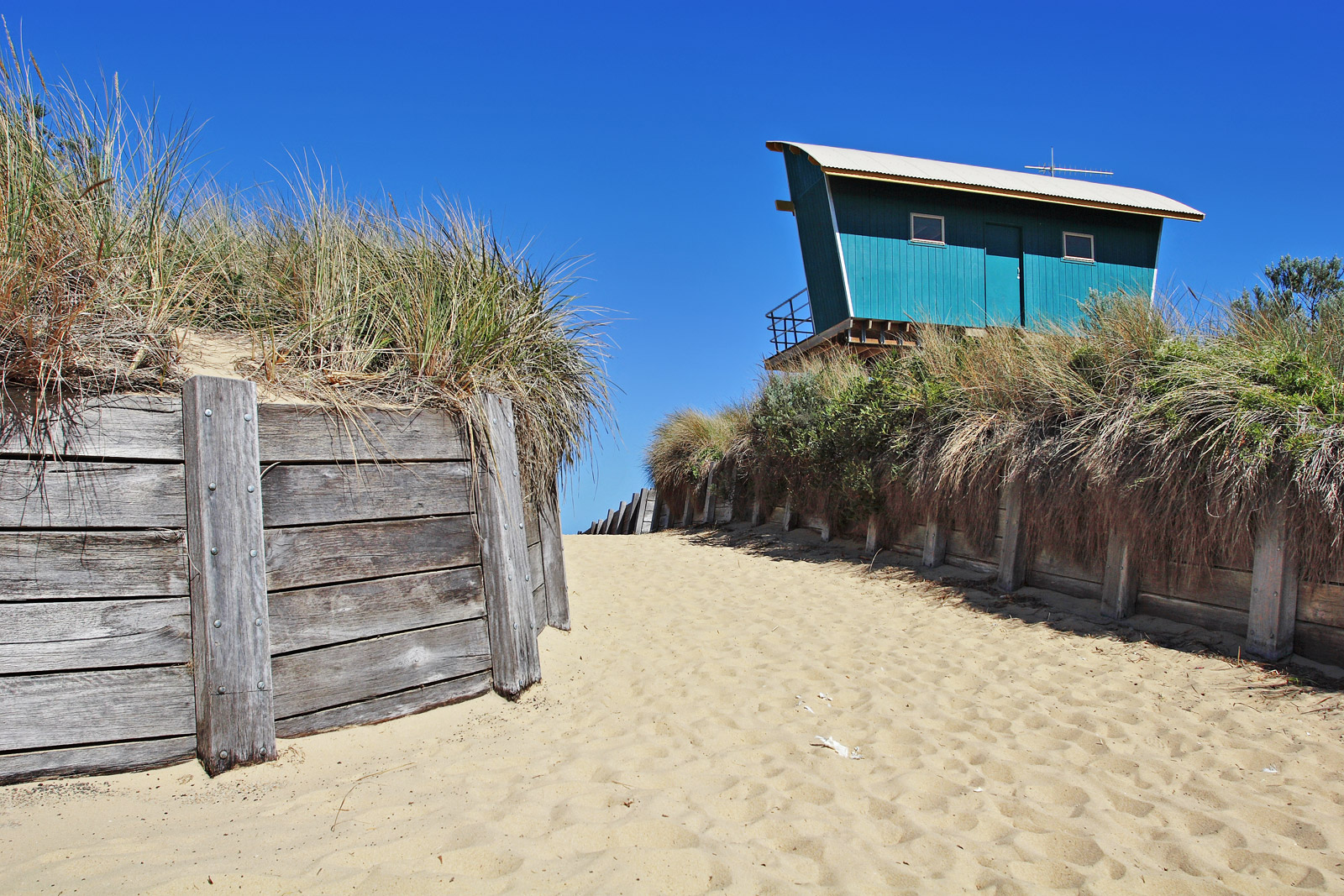
The Lakes Entrance SLSC's Lookout Tower on the Main Surf Beach

== See also ==
- The Lakes National Park
