= Gippsland Lakes =

Lake network in Victoria, Australia

- Lake Wellington, Lake Victoria, Lake King, Lake Reeve, Lake Tyers, Lake Coleman
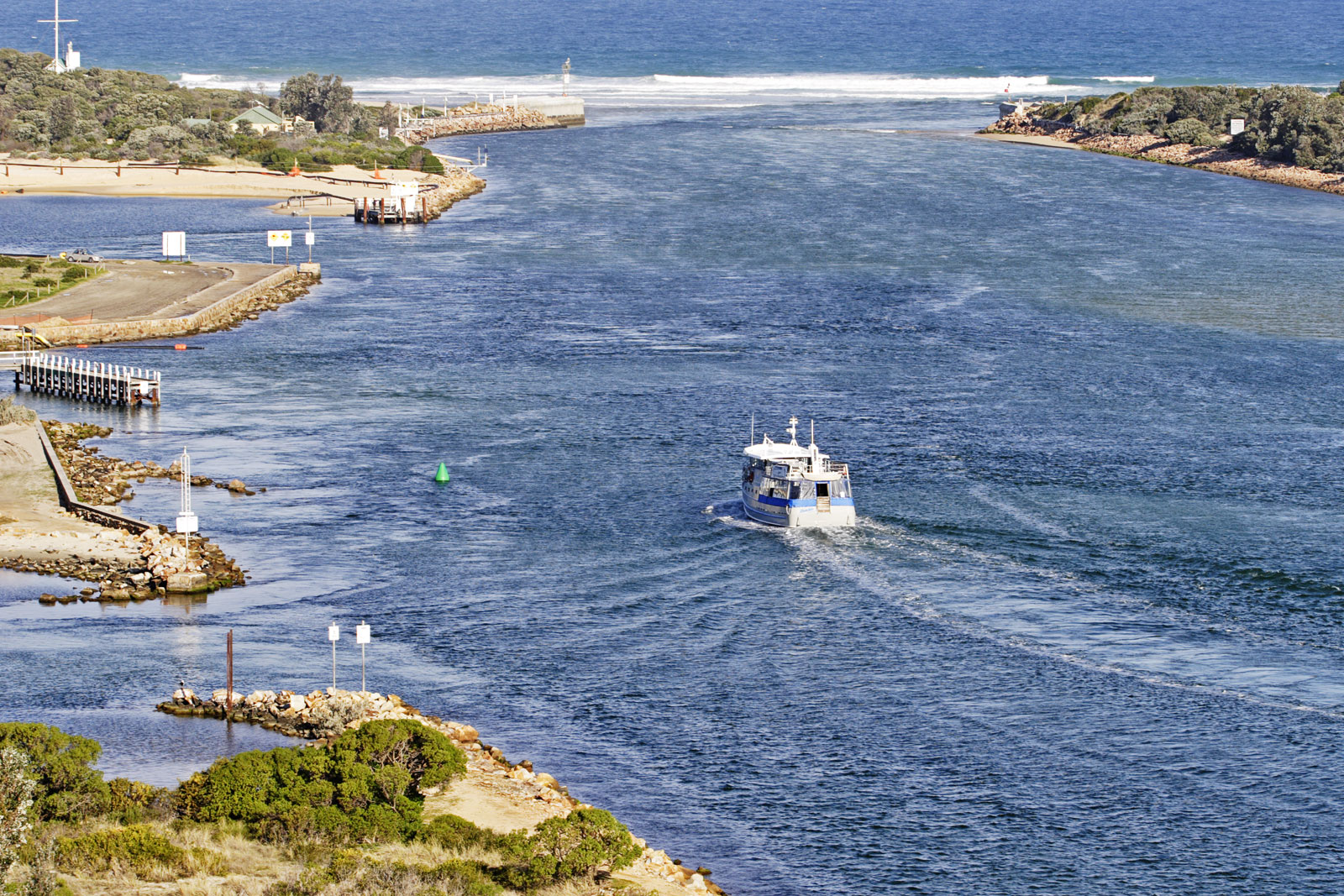
- The Entrance to Gippsland Lakes

- Location within Victoria

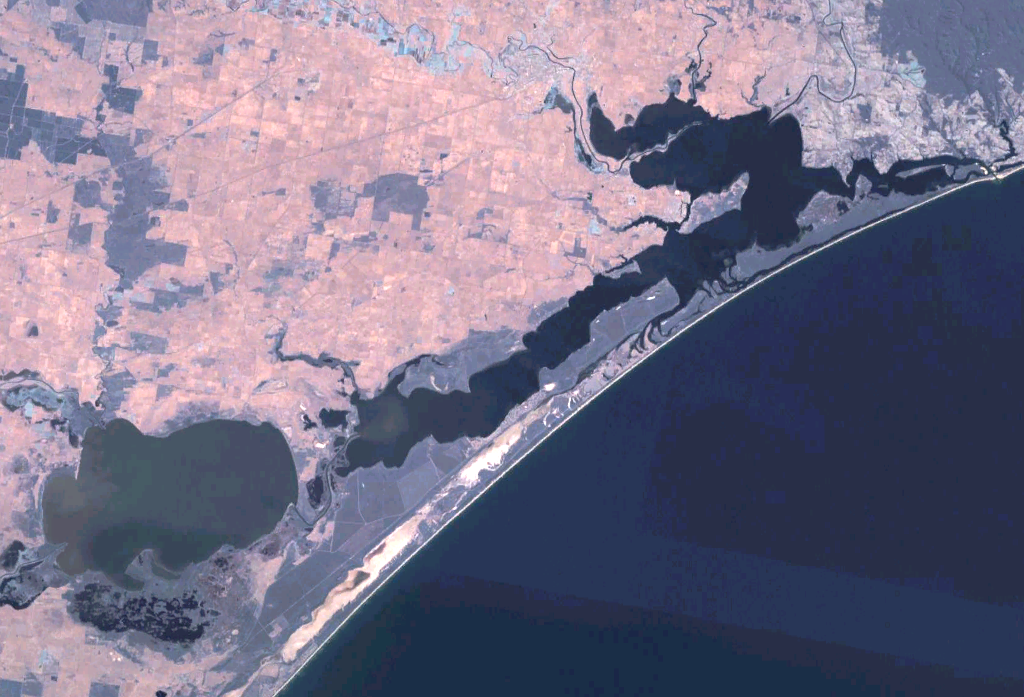
- Landsat 7 imagery of the Gippsland Lakes. Lakes Entrance is visible in the top right of the image.
- Location: Gippsland, Victoria
- Coordinates: 38°00′S 147°39′E
- Primary inflows: Avon, Thomson, Latrobe, Mitchell, Nicholson and Tambo rivers
- Primary outflows: Bass Strait
- Basin countries: Australia
- Surface area: 354 km^{2} (137 sq mi)
- Surface elevation: 0 m (0 ft)
- Settlements: Lakes Entrance, Bairnsdale

Ramsar Wetland
- Designated: 15 December 1982
- Reference no.: 269

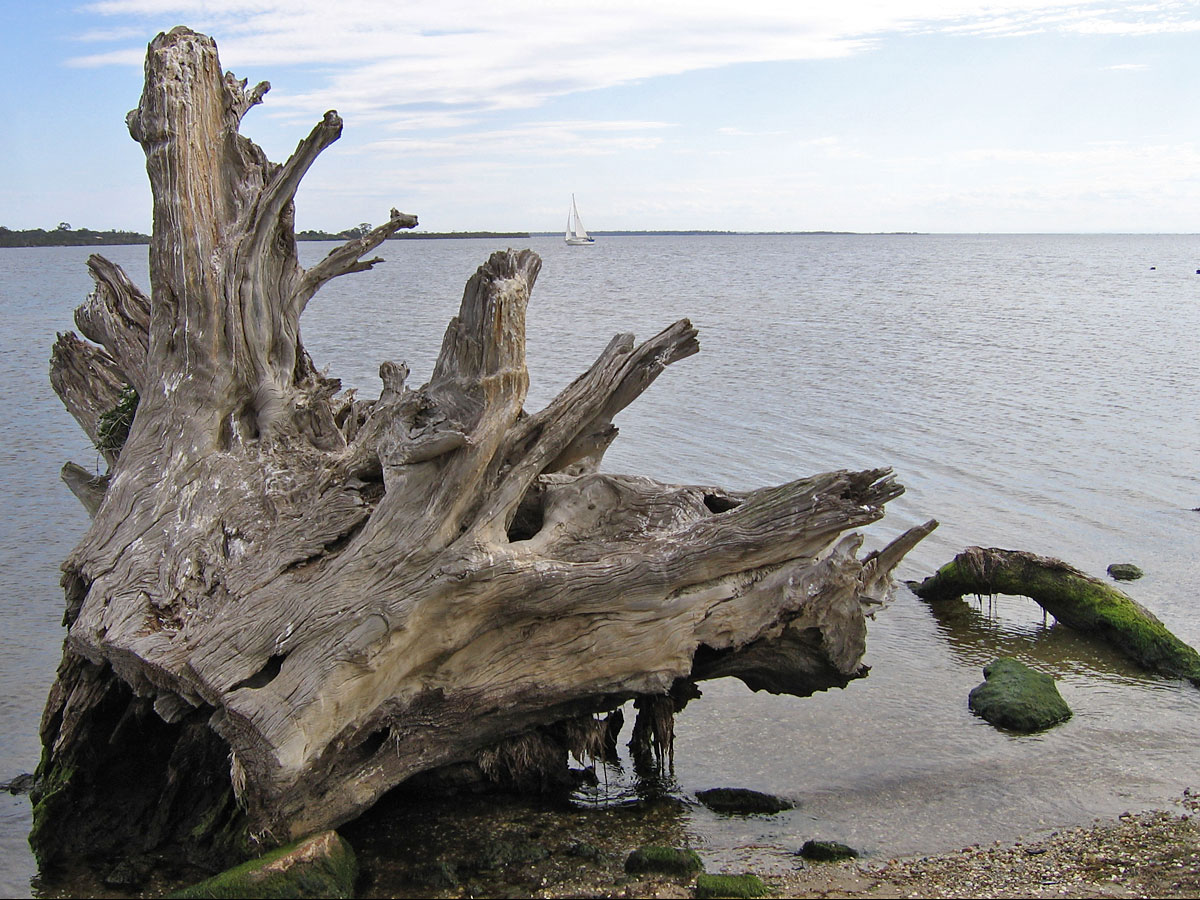
Lake King from Shaving Point in Metung

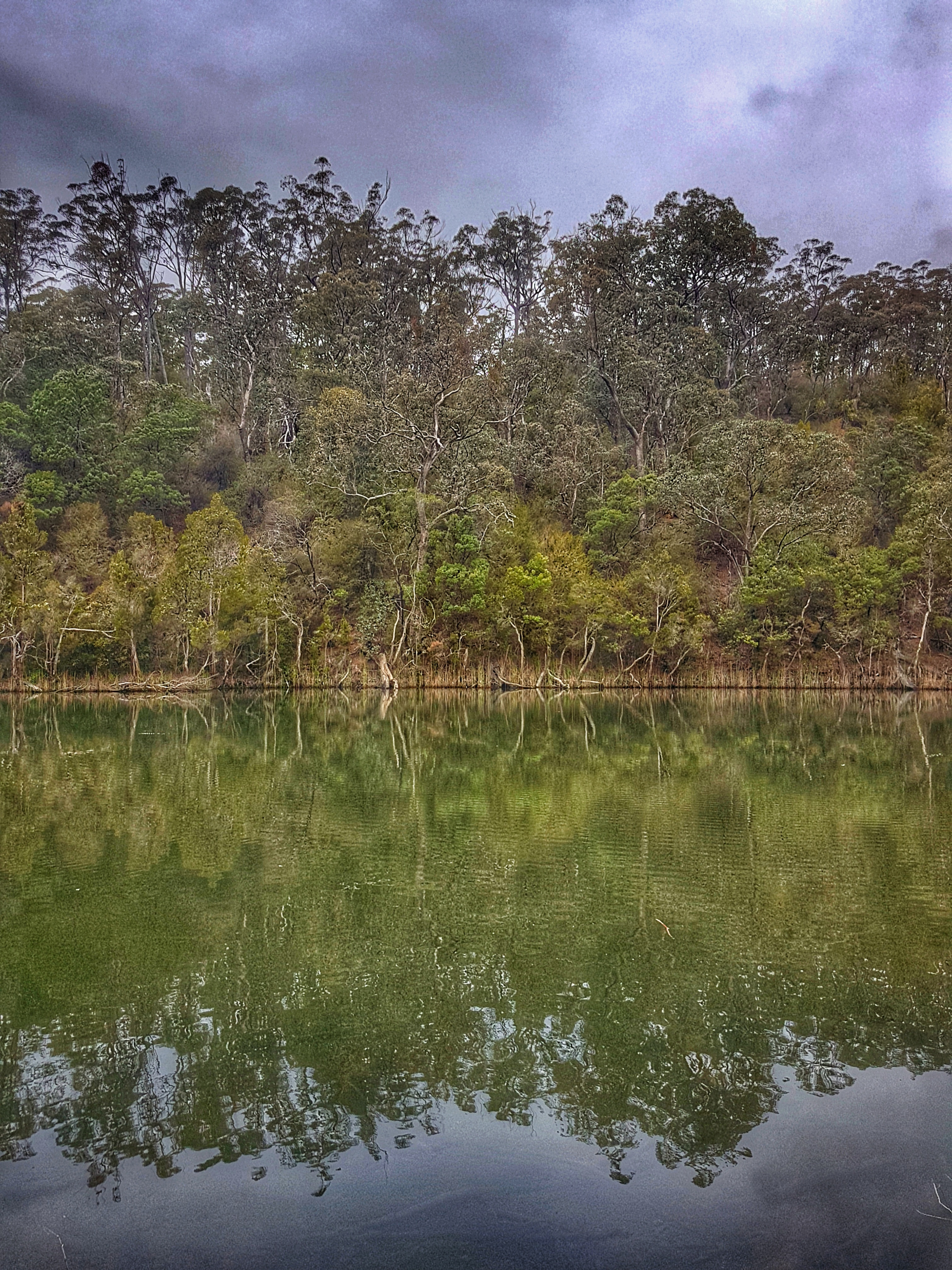
Lake Tyers, Gippsland Lakes, Victoria, Australia

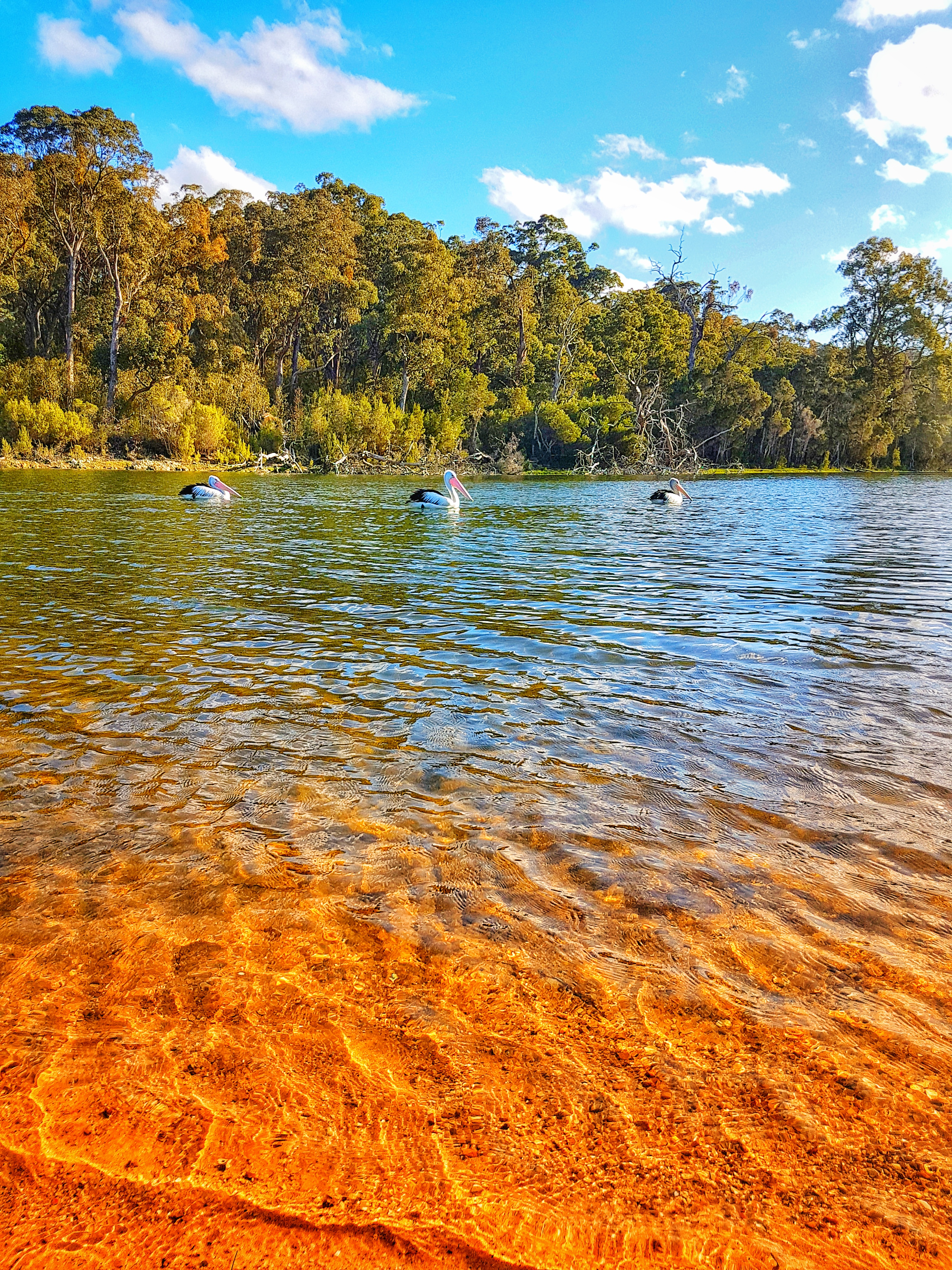
Trio of pelicans at Lake Tyers, Gippsland Lakes, Victoria, Australia

The Gippsland Lakes are a network of coastal lakes, marshes and lagoons in East Gippsland, Victoria, Australia covering an overall area of about 354 km^{2} (137 sq mi) between the rural towns of Lakes Entrance, Bairnsdale and Sale. The largest of the lakes are Lake Wellington (Gunai language: Murla), Lake King (Gunai: Ngarrang) and Lake Victoria (Gunai: Toonallook). The lakes are collectively fed by the Avon, Thomson, Latrobe, Mitchell, Nicholson and Tambo Rivers, and drain into Bass Strait through a short canal about 2 km (1.2 mi) southwest of Lakes Entrance town centre.

== History ==
The Gippsland Lakes were formed by two principal processes. The first is river delta alluvial deposition of sediment brought in by the rivers which flow into the lakes. Silt deposited by this process forms into long jetties which can run many kilometres into a lake, as exemplified by the Mitchell River silt jetties that run into Lake King. The second process is the action of sea current in Bass Strait which created the Ninety Mile Beach and cut off the river deltas from the sea.

Once the lakes were closed off a new cycle started, whereby the water level of the lakes would gradually rise until the waters broke through the barrier beach and the level would drop down until it equalised with sea-level. Eventually the beach would close-off the lakes and the cycle would begin anew. Sometimes it would take many years before a new channel to the sea was formed and not necessarily in the same place as the last one.

In 1889, a wall was built to fix the position of a naturally occurring channel between the lakes and the ocean at Lakes Entrance, to stabilise the water level, create a harbour for fishing boats and open up the lakes to shipping. This entrance needs to be dredged regularly, or the same process that created the Gippsland Lakes would render the entrance too shallow for seagoing vessels to pass through.

Due to flooding in 2011, Gippsland Lakes experienced blooms of bioluminescent Noctiluca scintillans.

== Overview ==
Lake	Gunai name	Area km^{2} (sq mi)	Reference
Lake Wellington	Murla	150 (58)	
Lake Victoria	Toonallook	150 (58)	
Lake Reeve	Walmunyee'ra	52 (20)	
Lake King	Ngarrang	44 (17)	
Lake Coleman	Nukkin-Ya	13 (5)	
Lake Tyers	Wannang-gatty	9.5 (3.7)	

== Tourism ==
The Gippsland Lakes provide a major hub for tourism, particularly for recreational boating and fishing enthusiasts. The lakes network can be explored by cruise, water taxi, or boat and kayak hire. On the fringes of the lakes are several tourist towns that swell to support the tourist trade, particularly in the summer months.

Lakes Entrance is the largest of the towns on the lakes with a population of 4,500. The town is well serviced with resorts, hotels and facilities. It is located with easy access to both the lakes network and the surf beach on Ninety Mile Beach, which is patrolled each summer.

Metung is a small village located on the tip of a peninsula sitting in the Gippsland Lakes, surrounded almost completely by water. It is an upmarket tourist destination with many dining options and artisan galleries.

Much of Paynesville’s accommodation and infrastructure are located on the network of canals. One of the key attractions is Raymond Island, known for its koala population.

The diversity of the brine waters of the lakes, surf beaches along Ninety Mile Beach and fresh water streams that feed the lakes, make the Gippsland Lakes a popular fishing destination. Local fish varieties include bream, mullet, flathead, luderick and trevally. Paynesville, Lakes Entrance and Metung all offer a number of jetties, boat ramps and berthing facilities.

== Environment ==
The lakes support numerous species of wildlife and there exist two protected areas within: The Lakes National Park and Gippsland Lakes Coastal Park. The Gippsland Lakes wetlands are protected by the international Ramsar Convention on wetlands. There are also approximately 400 indigenous flora species and 300 native fauna species. Three plants, two of them being orchid species, are listed as endangered. The numbers of southern right whales and humpback whales using the Lake Entrance area show increases in recent years, as the populations have started to recover from illegal hunts by the Soviet Union with help from Japan in 1960s-1970s.

Gippsland Lakes' marine water quality is monitored by the Environment Protection Authority of Victoria, along with Port Phillip and Western Port.

The water quality in East Gippsland Lakes in the 2021-2022 period declined compared to the previous one mostly due to the heavy rains bringing nutrients to the water in 2021 which lead to cyanobacteria to bloom until May 2022.

=== Burrunan dolphins ===
The lakes are home to about 50 of the recently described species of bottlenose dolphin, the Burrunan dolphin (Tursiops australis). The other 150 or so of this rare species are to be found in Port Phillip.

=== Birds ===
The wetlands provide habitat for about 20,000 waterbirds – including birds from as far afield as Siberia and Alaska. The lakes have been identified by BirdLife International as an Important Bird Area (IBA) because they regularly support over 1% of the global populations of black swans, chestnut teals and musk ducks, as well as many fairy terns.

== Photo ==
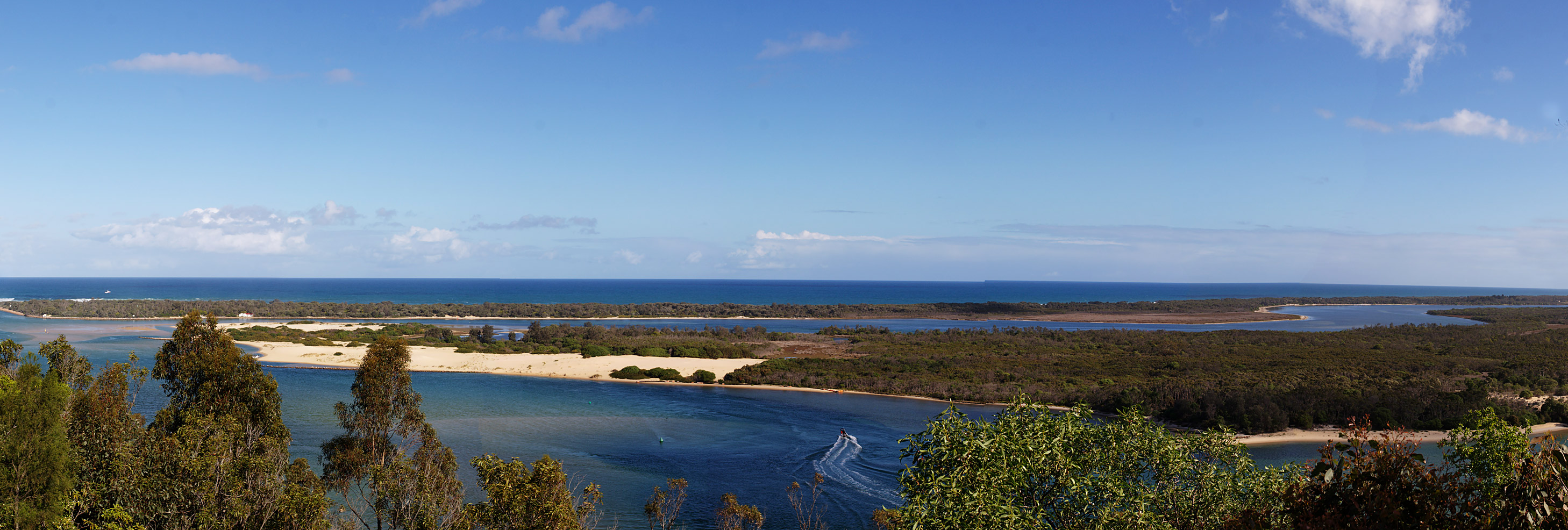
Gippsland Lakes

== See also ==
- Banksia Swamp
- Gippsland Lakes Coastal Park
