= Warrowen massacre =

Apparent mass killing in Australia

The Warrowen massacre was an apparent mass killing of Bunurong people by a group of Kurnai people in the vicinity of present-day Brighton, Victoria, Australia. It is dated to the early 1830s, close in time to the founding of Melbourne. The killing was recorded separately several years later by William Thomas and George Augustus Robinson, based on testimony from Aboriginal sources. Thomas stated that at least 60 people had been killed. According to Robinson, the massacre contributed to the end of an entire Bunurong clan, the Yowengerre, allowing a Kurnai clan to take over their territory.

== Background ==
Early European settlers in the Western Port and Gippsland regions of Victoria were told that there had been a long-running conflict between indigenous groups, with "each carrying out surprise attacks on the other and killing several people at a time". According to Robinson, the victims of the massacre at Warrowen were the Yowengerre (or Yowenjerre) and the perpetrators were the Borro Borro Willun. There was an "existing tenuous connection" between the two, as their respective neighbours exchanged women for marriages. The Yowengerre (or Yowenjerre) were the easternmost clan of the Bunurong people, occupying the Tarwin River watershed and parts of Wilsons Promontory. The traditional country of the Borro Borro willun (clan) of the Gunai (Kurnai) was the Avon River of Gippsland. The Borro Borro were surrounded by a larger group, the Braiakaulung (Briakalung), but were more closely linked with the Brataualung to the south.

== Events ==
The main sources for the massacre are the letters of William Thomas, the Assistant Protector of Aborigines of Port Phillip. In an 1840 letter to Superintendent Charles La Trobe, he wrote that "about four years ago 77 people were killed at Little Brighton not nine miles from Melbourne". The letter listed "events in which the Bonurong had suffered at the hands of the Kurnai", in order to "explain to La Trobe the deadly enmity that had existed for a very long time between the Bonurong and their eastern neighbours". He further explained that he had "known about these historic events almost from when he arrived in Melbourne, and that they formed part of the Bonurong singing".

In a later report in 1849, Thomas recorded that:

[the] blacks remember the awful affair at Warrowen (place of sorrow) near where Brighton now stands, where in 1834 nearly a quarter of the Western Port blacks were massacred by the Gippsland blacks who stole up on them before dawn of day."

Thomas gave further detail of the massacre in his description of an incised tree in a paper on Aboriginal monuments and inscriptions:

[They have] no monuments whatever further than devices on trees where any great calamity have befallen them. On a large gum tree in Brighton, on the estate of Mr McMillan was a host of blacks lying as dead carved on the trunk for a yard or two up. The spot was called Woorroowen or incessant weeping. Near this spot in the year 1833 or 4, the Gippsland blacks stole at night upon the Western Port or Coast tribe and killed 60 or 70 of them.

While passing through Gippsland in 1844, George Augustus Robinson wrote in his diaries that "the natives of Gippsland have killed 70 of the Boongerong [Bunurong] at Brighton". His informant was Munmunginna (transcribed by Robinson as "Mun mun jin ind"), whose father was from the Yowengerre clan.

According to Fels (2011), the massacre was "well known to early settlers, is mentioned in histories of Brighton, and pioneers' accounts – it was commonplace information in early Melbourne history". Cooper states:

The aboriginals told the settlers of a tradition which they had of a great tribal fight in the vicinity of Landcox Park. Large numbers of those engaged were killed. Settlers in the early days found bones, & evidences of camp fires having been numerous on the place pointed out as the scene of the fight.

== Location ==
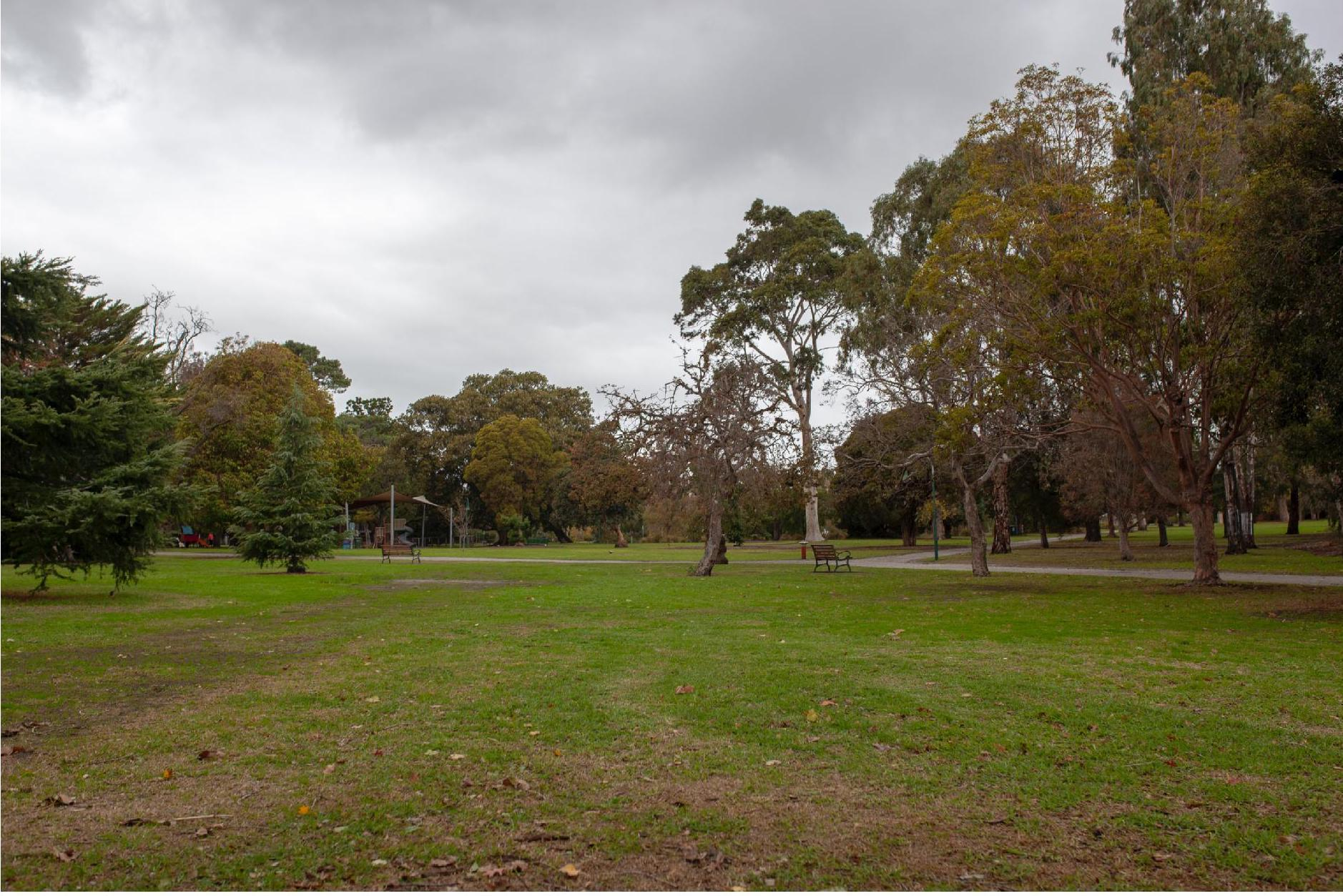
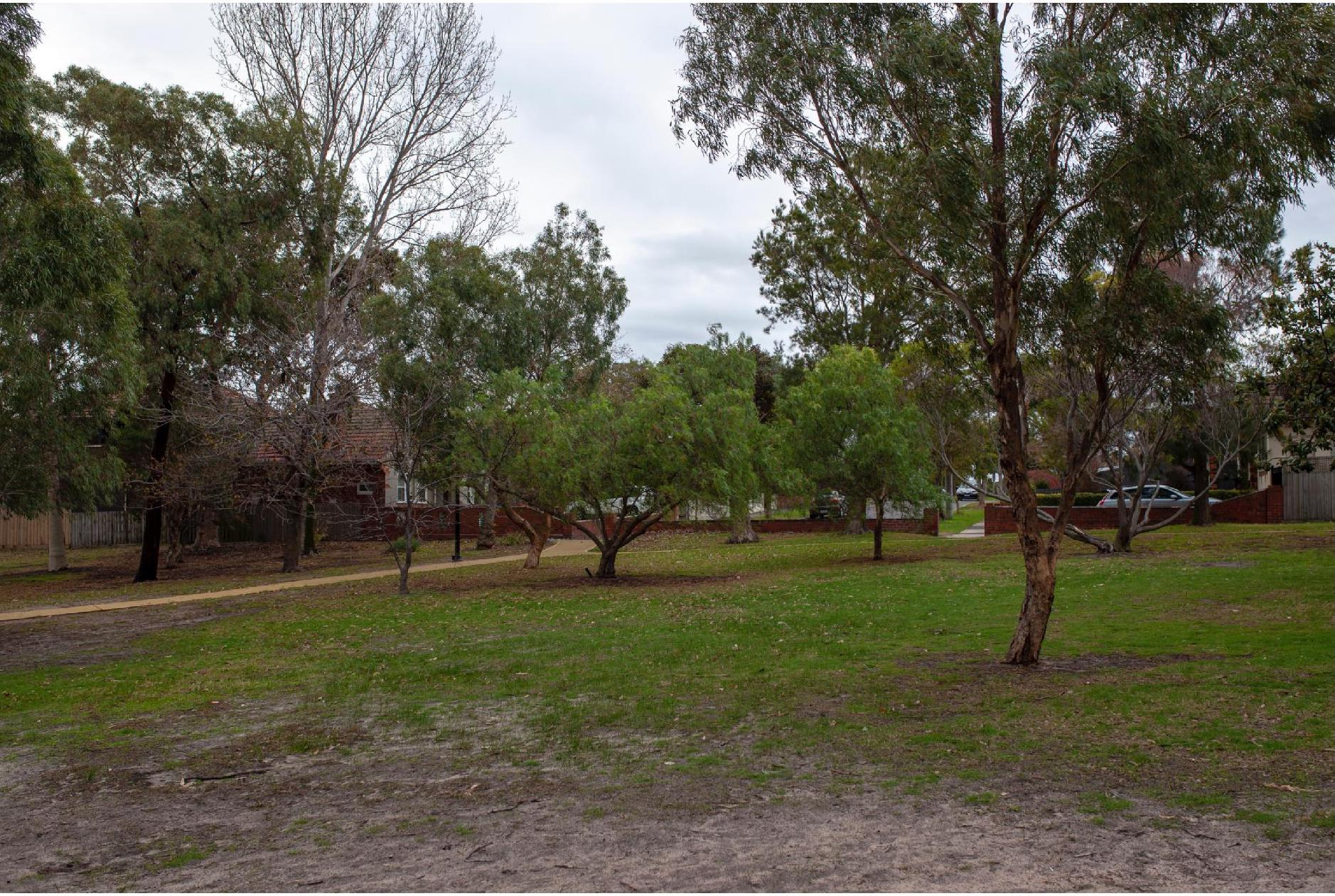
Landcox Park (top) and Hurlingham Park (bottom)

Thomas named the place of the killings as "Little Brighton" or in the local language Warrowen (also spelt Warowen, Worawen, Worrowen or Woorroowen), meaning "place of sorrow" or "incessant weeping". Robinson also gave Brighton as the location of the massacre. The area was one of the Bunurong's regular places of encampment, but was also used by "anyone travelling to and from Melbourne, even though the route was outside their own country". The Bunurong continued to use the area after the killings, as in 1843 "Worawen" was listed as the place of death of Worrowurk, a 28-year-old man.

Based on accounts from early settlers, Fels (2011) identifies this location with two parks in present-day Brighton East. John Butler Cooper's history of Brighton states that the first European settlers found bones in the area and were told of "a great tribal fight in the vicinity of Landcox Park". Another account held by the Brighton Historical Society mentioned bones being ploughed up in Hurlingham Park. According to Fels, the two parks are "practically contiguous" and "before being renamed separately by Europeans, they would have been the same place or space". The pioneers' accounts state that the tree Thomas mentioned stood until the 1860s when it was felled by lightning.

== Related incidents and aftermath ==
In his letter to La Trobe, Thomas recorded two other mass killings inflicted on the Bunurong by the Kurnai. In the first, which he dated to about 1820, "nearly half the tribe were killed" at Buckkermitterwarrer (Baggamahjarrawah) near Arthurs Seat. The second was at Kunnung near Koo Wee Rup, where he was told twelve women, children and elderly were killed. The Kunnung massacre was also recorded by James Maxwell Clow, who gave the number of dead as 25. Thomas also recorded in 1840 a revenge expedition by the Bunurong which resulted in the deaths of nine people.

In 1844, Robinson noted that the Yowengerre "once powerful are defunct and the country in consequence is unburnt having no native inhabitants ... this is the reason why the country is so scrubby". He stated there were only two survivors of the clan, Munmungina and Kurburra (also Kaborer or Carborer). However, Robinson's hypothesis about unburnt country as evidence of depopulation has been challenged by Ian Clark, who believes it was based on a false analogy with other areas. By 1844 the Borro Borro had permanently relocated into what had previously been Yowengerre country. According to Wilson & Ellender (2002), the "push factors" for the move would have been overpopulation, inter-Aboriginal conflict and conflict with Europeans, particularly Angus McMillan who had taken over their lands to establish his "Bushy Park" estate.

== See also ==
- List of massacres of Indigenous Australians
