= Gorrie =

Gorrie may refer to:

== People ==
=== Surname ===
- Alan Gorrie (born 1946), Scottish bassist, guitarist, keyboardist and singer
- Dave Gorrie (born 1930), American former UC Santa Barbara and Pepperdine Head Baseball Coach
- Donald Gorrie (born 1933), Scottish Liberal Democrat politician, and former Member of the Scottish Parliament
- John Gorrie (disambiguation), multiple people
- Nayuka Gorrie (born 1990/1991), Aboriginal Australian writer and actor
- Veronica Gorrie (born 1971/1972), Aboriginal Australian writer, mother of Nayuka

=== Given name ===
- Charles Gorrie Wynne (1911–1999), significant figure in optical lens design

== Places ==
- Gorrie, Ontario, an urban community in Huron County, Ontario
- Gorrie Airfield, Royal Australian Air Force airfield north of Larrimah, Northern Territory, Australia during World War II
- Gorrie Lake (Ontario), lake in Timiskaming District, Ontario, Canada, east of Temagami

== See also ==
- Arthur Gorrie Correctional Centre, prison located on the Ipswich Motorway at Wacol in the western suburbs of Brisbane, Australia
- Brasfield & Gorrie, privately held construction management, general contracting, and design-build service provider
- Gorry, a surname
- John Gorrie Memorial Bridge carries US 98 and US 319 over the Apalachicola Bay, connecting Apalachicola with Eastpoint
- John Gorrie State Museum, Florida State Park located in Apalachicola, a block off U.S. 98
