= Gorries =

Gorries may refer to:

- Paul Gorries (born 1981), South African sprinter
- Gorries, nickname of the Orthodox Mennonites

== See also ==
- Gorrie (disambiguation)
- Gorries (disambiguation)
- Gorry
