= Warrigal Creek Massacre =

Massacre in Victoria, Australia

Coordinates: 37°40′14″S 146°39′57″E

Warrigal Creek is the site of an 1843 massacre of Gunai/Kurnai people in colonial Victoria, during the Australian frontier wars. The creek is on a farm near Sale, 200 kilometres (120 mi) east of Melbourne, in the South Gippsland area of Victoria, Australia.

== Massacre ==
In July 1843, a man named Ronald Macalister was killed by Aboriginal men near Port Albert, on the coast of Victoria. The Scottish colonist and pastoralist, Angus McMillan, led a group of around 20 colonists to attack and kill several groups of Aboriginal people across a number of days. The group of Gaelic-speaking Scotsmen was known as the "Highland Brigade". The attack on the Brataualung people camped at Warrigal Creek was one of several incidents resulting in loss of life among the Gunai Kurnai people.

Ronald Macalister was murdered by two blackfellows about five miles from Port Albert, on the west side of Tarra Creek. He was on his way to Mason's Station, known as Green Mount. A party got up by McMillan went in pursuit of the murderers, to avenge Macalister's death. After an absence of some weeks they returned.

— R. T. Easterby (1912)

The estimates of numbers of deaths vary: some historical accounts say that 60 people were killed, while other sources suggest that up to 150 people may have been killed. Some historians assert that the number of 60 is an exaggeration, despite the witness accounts. The statistical discrepancies likely emerged because Macmillan's group killed Aboriginal people at five different locations in the area.

A witness, William Hoddinott of East Bairnsdale, wrote an account of the Highland Brigade in 1925 under the pseudonym of 'Gippslander'. Hoddinott wrote a similar account in 1940.

The brigade coming up to the blacks camped around the Waterhole at Warrigal Creek surrounded them and fired into them, killing a great number, some escaped into the scrub, others jumped into the waterhole, and, as fast as they put their heads up for breath, they were shot until the water was red with blood. I knew two blacks, who though wounded came out of the hole alive. One was a boy at the time about 12 or 14 years old. He was hit in the eye by a slug, captured by the whites, and made to lead the 'brigade' from one camp to another.

— Gippslander, The Gap (1925)

Hoddinott said that more than 100 Aboriginal people were killed on that day.

About two years later, Assistant Protector of Aborigines William Thomas learnt that because of the deaths, there were not many Aboriginal people left in the area.

there are not many left, he said he had a Brother who had been in Gippsland almost from the first his name was Bunton [Hugh Buntine] & kept a public house in Gipps Land by the Dirty Water Holes & a cattle Station adjoining to Mr Mc Allister, who was killed, and that after Mr McAllister’s murder great slaughter of the blacks took place, & that on his brothers Station a cart Load of Blks bones might be gatherd up, he stated that the Blks were fond of Mr Mcalisster and Mr McAllister of them, but in Mr McAllisters absence some his Men had stole some Lubras, and on the Blks wanting them they deliberately shot the blacks that this was unbeknown to Mr McAllister & when he returned they met him on the road &killed him. I asked him if he thought that such was the case, he said yes it is well known, in the neighbourhood of his brother.

— William Thomas (21 April 1845). Diary of William Thomas.

Historian Peter Gardner, in a review of all accounts of the massacre, wrote that MacMillan and the Highland Brigade aimed to wipe out all the Aboriginal people in the area. Gardner concludes that McMillan's group initially killed two family groups at Warrigal Creek waterhole and then a few days later killed another 60 people at the mouth of Warrigal Creek, then killing three other groups at Freshwater Creek, Gammon Creek, and Red Hill.

Macalister was apparently talking to them when a blow from a "waddy" ended his career. It was the last serious outrage by the blacks. Aroused to fury, the settlers mobilised and beat up the country from Glenaladale to the sea. It was stated that the punitive expedition came early upon some of the blacks wearing Macalister's clothes; but no member of the party was ever induced to give further particulars. But from that day onward the natives recognised that Gippsland was a white man's country, and gave no further trouble.

— H.P.B., "Forgotten History", The Australasian (17 July 1920)

Despite the widespread belief that MacMillan led several massacres, as of 2021 there are over 12 monuments in the Gippsland region dedicated to him.

== See also ==
- Gunaikurnai people
- Gippsland massacres
- List of massacres of Indigenous Australians

== Bibliography ==
- The Book of the Bush
- "The Settling of Gippsland - A Regional History", by Patrick Morgan, published by Gippsland Municipalities Association, Traralgon, 1997 ISBN 0-646-33857-9
- Gardner, Peter, 'The Warrigal Creek massacre', Journal of the Royal Australian Historical Society, pp. 47–51, June, 1980.
