= Albert Mullett =

Aboriginal spokesperson

Albert Mullett (1933–2014) was a respected Aboriginal elder in Victoria, Australia, and spokesperson for members of the Gunai/Kurnai peoples, Gippsland, Victoria. His ancestry includes Gunditjmara and Gunai/Kurnai clans. He was actively involved in Aboriginal education and the preservation of Koorie cultural heritage for many years. He was also a skilled craftsman of shields, boomerangs and artifacts.

== Early and personal life ==
Although born in Melbourne, Albert Mullett lived with his family on the fringe of Lake Tyers Mission, on the opposite side of the lake, as “part-Aboriginal” families were forced to leave the mission. His family survived by following seasonal work up and down the coast. His family was affected by government policies that allowed for the taking away of Aboriginal children – he lost two brothers that he was never to meet.

== Native title ==
Mullett was a leading figure who led the Gunai/Kurnai people to gain full native title over their traditional lands in 2010 and he was a respected master-craftsman of traditional wooden artefacts.

== Indigenous Honour Roll ==
In 2013 Mullett was inducted into the Victorian Indigenous Honour Roll. The following statement was made at the announcement:

Born in Melbourne, Uncle Albert Mullett is a greatly respected Gunai Elder and community leader in Gippsland. He has made many important contributions in the fields of education, cultural advocacy, land management and native title. He has worked closely with numerous cultural and heritage bodies, as well as government, private sector and community-run organisations. After 15 years of tireless campaigning for Native Title rights, Albert played a leading role in the negotiation of the historic Gunai/Kurnai Native Title Settlement Agreement which was signed in 2010. Albert is also a respected master-craftsman of traditional wooden artefacts, including shields and boomerangs.

== Boorun's Canoe ==
Boorun's Canoe was an exhibition held at Melbourne Museum from 6 July 2012 to 7 November 2012. The exhibition was a celebration of the traditions of Victorian Aboriginal culture and its continuation and strength. The exhibition tells the story of how Mullett taught his grandson, Steaphan Paton, and other young men in his family, to build a bark canoe, an age-old tradition that has been practised for many years by the Gunai/Kurnai people of Gippsland. Boorun's Canoe is a significant project showcasing the strength and pride of cultural knowledge being passed through generations and the vital importance of community maintaining and teaching culture.

Albert Mullett died on 7 July 2014. His funeral was held at The Knob Reserve in Stratford where an estimated 2000 people paid their respects.
