= Old Gippstown =

Open-air museum in Moe, Victoria, Australia

- Established: 1973
- Location: Moe, Victoria, Australia
- Coordinates: 38.1846383°S 146.2344812°E
- Owner: Gippstown Reserve Committee of Management
- Website: www.oldgippstown.com.au

Old Gippstown is an open-air museum and reconstructed pioneer township located in Moe, Victoria, Australia.

It portrays the settlement era of Gippsland from the 1850s through to the 1950s.

Set in 3 hectares of parkland, Old Gippstown is visited by over 20,000 people each year.

== Founding and history ==
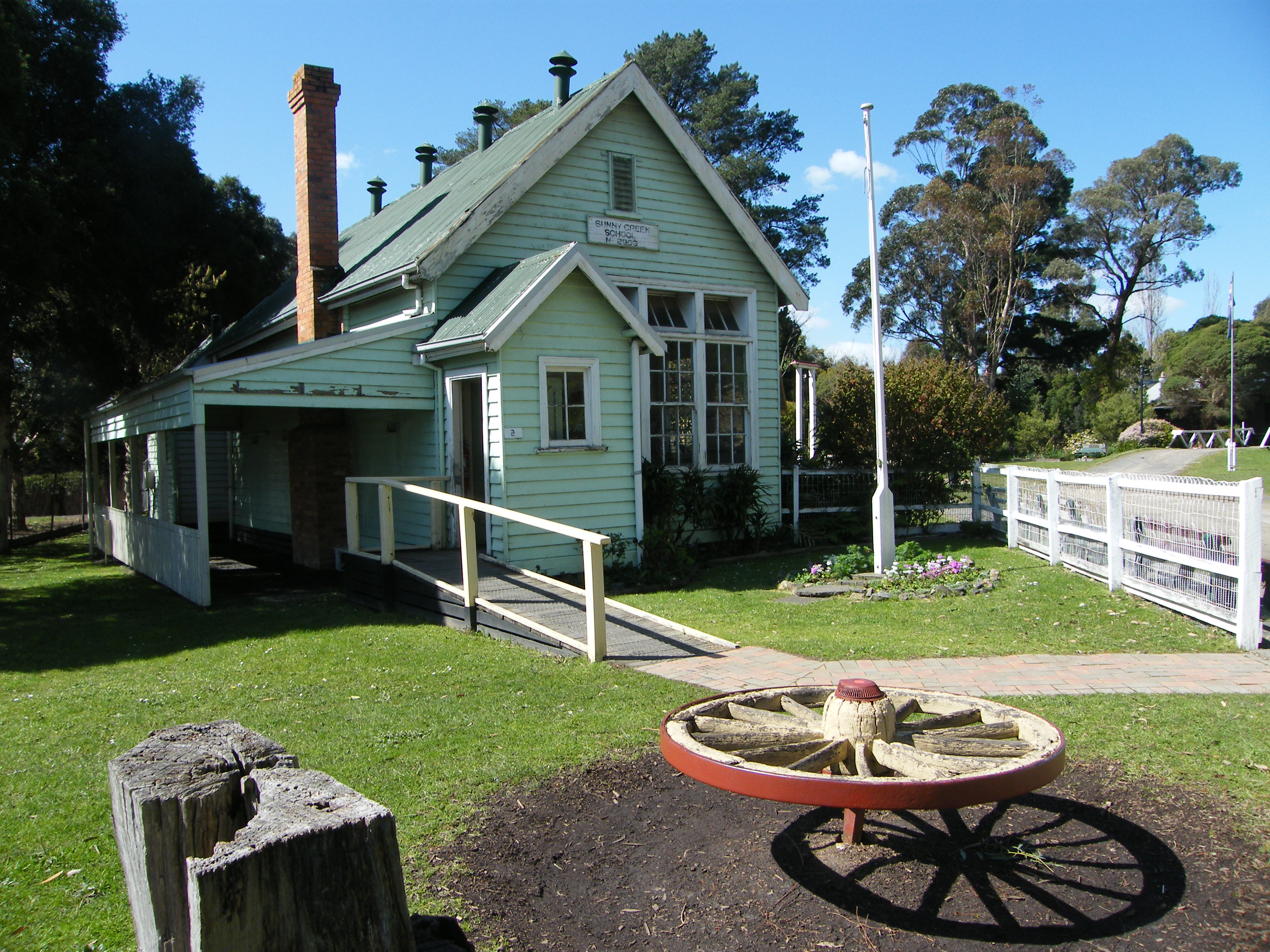
Sunny Creek School

The park was established in late 1967 by the City of Moe Development Association. It was laid out by architect Fritz Suendermann. It opened as the Gippsland Folk Museum in 1973 and was later renamed Old Gippstown. Officially opened in 1973, Old Gippstown provides large-scale exhibits illustrating the history of the Gippsland region. In the 1990s the park came under the authority of the Department of Sustainability and Environment (now DEECA), and the collection is owned by the state of Victoria.

Today, Old Gippstown is managed by the Gippstown Reserve Committee of Management, a group of volunteers who oversee the operations and strategy of the Park. The park is mostly staffed by volunteers who work to maintain the ever-expanding collections of artefacts, vehicles and buildings that typify the heritage of the Gippsland area.

== Buildings ==
Old Gippstown has over forty historical buildings, mostly dating from the mid-19th century to the early 20th century.

- Sunny Creek School – SS2903. The school building at Old Gippstown dates from the 1920s, but the school itself operated from 1889 through to 24 June 1966.
- Water Wheel. Old Gippstown's Water Wheel was originally used to generate electricity for a boarding house in Buxton.
- Moe Holy Trinity Anglican Church. The church was dedicated on 3 December 1895 and deconsecrated in 1968 after a new church was built.

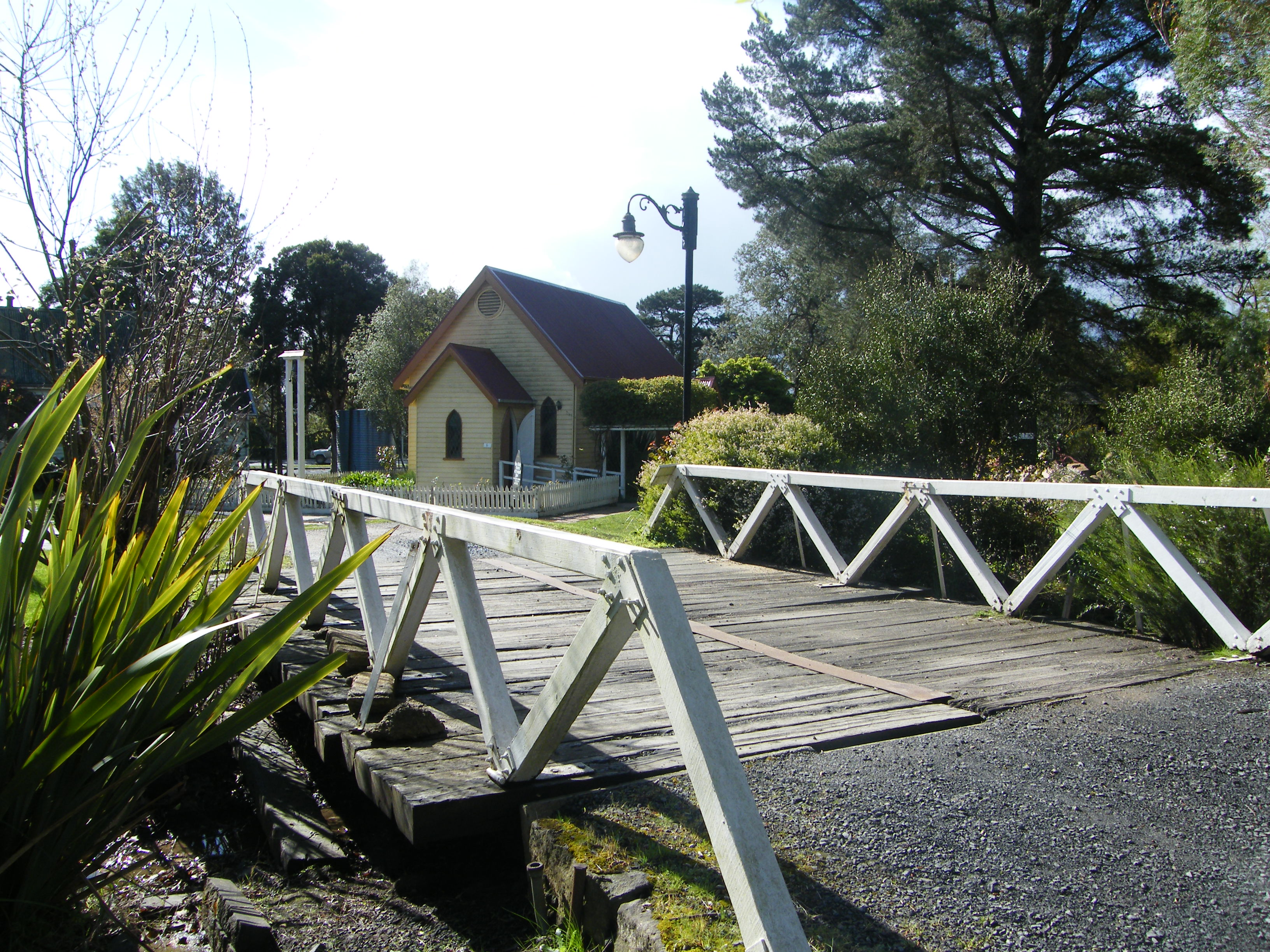
Moe Holy Trinity Anglican Church

- Angus McMillan’s Bushy Park homestead. Built for McMillan in 1848, it was originally located on the Avon River between Boisdale and Briagolong.
- Coach House. Originally built as a barn on a Willow Grove farm, it now houses part of Old Gippstown's extensive horse-drawn vehicle collection.
- Rhoden's Cobb and Co Inn. It was built near Pakenham in 1863 as a refreshment stop for the Cobb and Co coach route from Melbourne to Sale.
- Meeniyan National Bank. Built for the Colonial Bank of Australasia just before 1900, it became a National Bank of Australasia branch in 1914.
- "Loren" Iron House. In the mid-19th century gold rush period there was a large population increase and insufficient housing, so complete pre-fabricated buildings were imported, including iron houses like Loren.
- Narracan General store. The original Narracan general store was built in 1889.
- Narracan Mechanics' Institute Hall. This building was built in 1905 replacing a building from 1878. It is currently used by a number of local groups and is one of the newest Masonic Lodges in Victoria.

== Collections ==
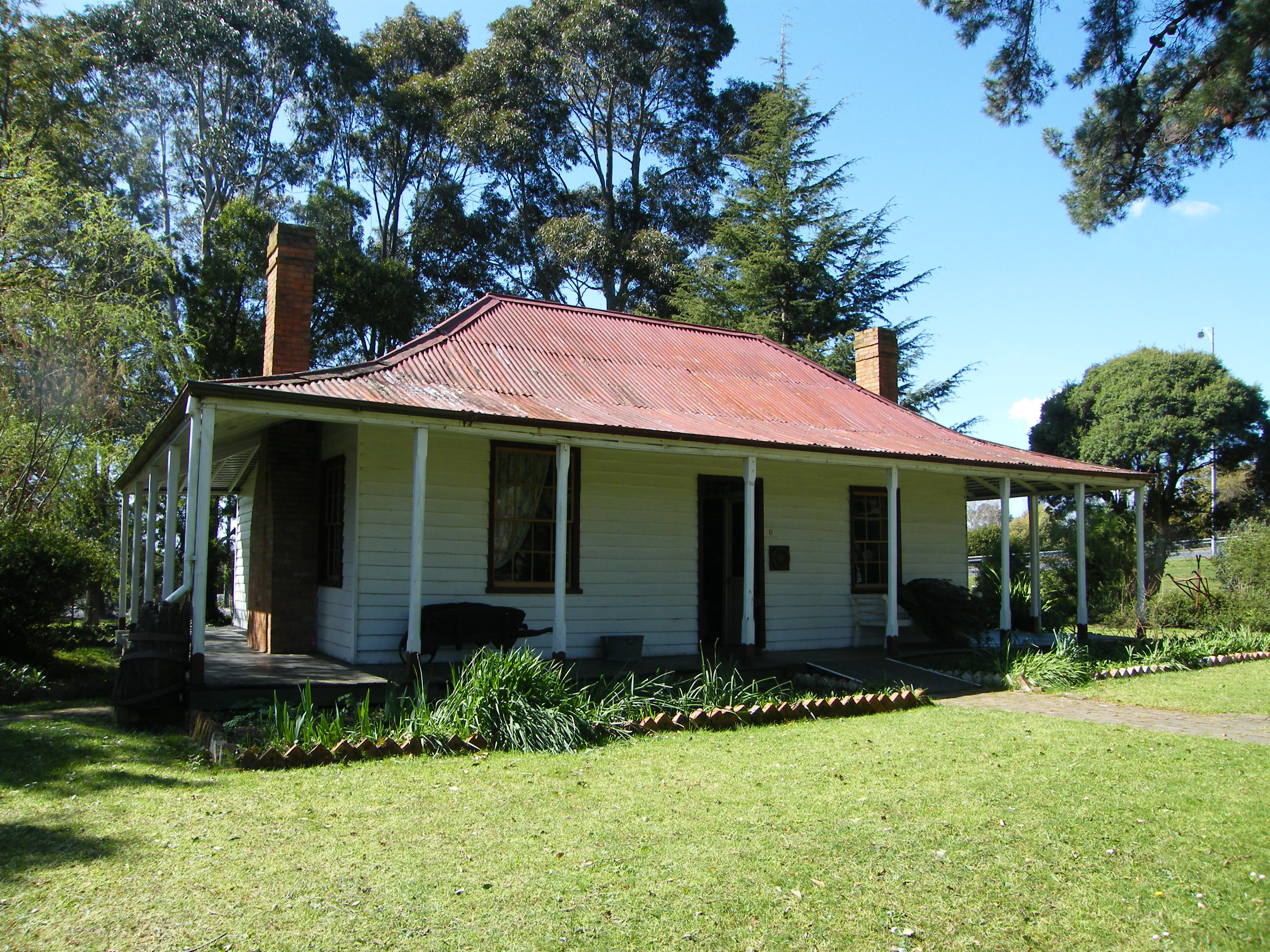
Angus McMillan's Bushy Park homestead

The extensive historical collection on display at the park comprises various antiques, artwork, books and papers, the largest publicly owned collection of horse-drawn vehicles, machinery, tools, and a wide range of unique and forgotten devices all representing the pioneer era in Gippsland. There is also a display of military antiques from the first and second world wars.

== Events ==
A large number of events are held at Old Gippstown throughout the year, including Australia Day, Father's Day Car Show, Pirates Day, Fairies and Unicorns Day, Christmas and Carols in the Park, as well as others. In addition, the Park grounds and function rooms are frequently hired for weddings, reunions and other special occasions.

== Groups which use Old Gippstown ==
Old Gippstown is used by a broad range of community groups, including those doing meditation, crafts, arts, car clubs and more. In addition it is the meeting place for the Old Gippstown Men's Shed, Latrobe Valley Woodworking and Woodturning Club and the Old Gippstown Masonic Lodge. Many school groups also regularly take excursions to Old Gippstown, and the Park's function rooms are often hired out to training organisations and other local businesses who wish to make use of the space available and the easy-to-reach location.
