= McGorry =

McGorry is a surname. Notable people with the surname include:

- Brian McGorry (born 1970), English footballer
- Matt McGorry (born 1986), American actor and activist
- Patrick McGorry (born 1952), Australian psychiatrist

== See also ==
- Gorry
- McGarry
- McGrory
