= John Gorrie (disambiguation) =

John Gorrie (1803–1855) was an American physician, scientist, inventor, and humanitarian.

John Gorrie may also refer to:

- John Gorrie (director) (born 1932), British television director
- Sir John Gorrie (judge) (1829–1892), British colonial judge and diplomat
- John Gorrie (elder) (born 1950), Kurnai Elder of East Gippsland, Victoria, Australia
