= Veronica Gorrie =

Aboriginal Australian writer

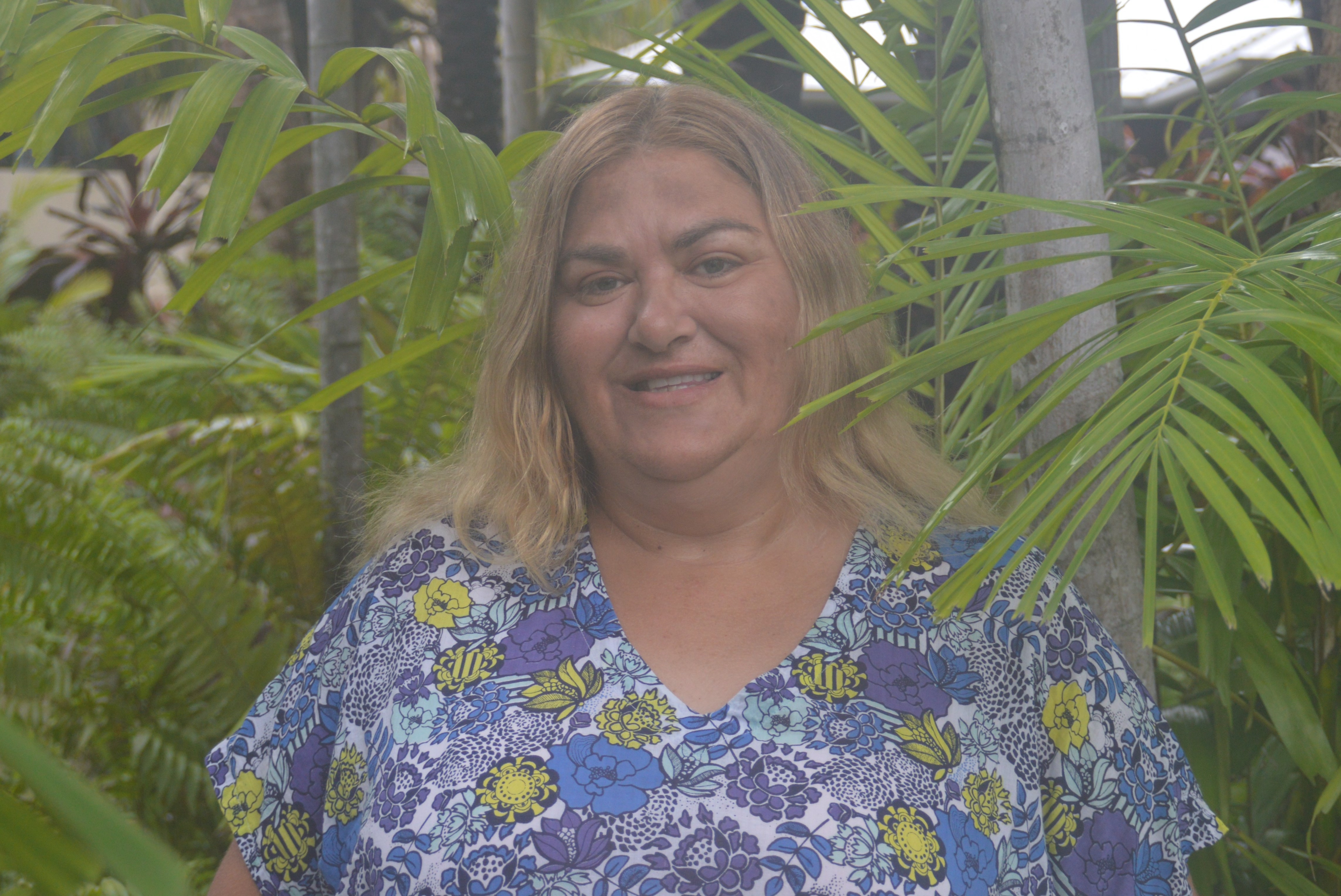
- Born: 1971 or 1972 (age 54–55)
- Children: 3, including Nayuka Gorrie
- Writing career
- Notable works: Black and Blue: A memoir of racism and resilience
- Notable awards: Victorian Prize for Literature (2022)

Veronica Gorrie (born 1971/1972), also known as Veronica Heritage-Gorrie, is an Aboriginal Australian writer. She is a Gunai woman of the Krauatungalang clan. Her first book, Black and Blue: A Memoir of Racism and Resilience, a memoir reflecting on her Aboriginality and the decade she spent in the police force, was released in 2021. Black and Blue won the Victorian Prize for Literature, Australia's richest literary award, in 2022.

== Early life and education ==
Veronica Gorrie was born in 1971 or 1972, daughter of John (Gunai Krauatungalang) and Heather (a white first-generation Australian). John is a former Aboriginal liaison officer and child protection worker who was the first known Aboriginal man to receive a Public Service Medal.

Gorrie grew up in Morwell, in the Gippsland region of Victoria.

== Career ==
Beginning in 2001, Gorrie worked as a police officer in the Queensland Police Service. While she joined the force wanting to "help to eliminate or eradicate the fear and mistrust [Aboriginal] people have towards police," she has since discussed "witness[ing] brutality, excessive use of force, black deaths in custody and ongoing racism" during her time in the occupation, and was medically discharged in 2011. Since her retirement, she has sharply criticised Australian police, claiming they are "mainly white, dominated by men, and built on systemic racism, misogyny, homophobia, and bullying."

After her retirement from police work, she embarked upon a writing career, appearing at the 2020 and 2021 Emerging Writers' Festivals and the 2021 Sydney Writers' Festival. Her first book, Black and Blue: A memoir of racism and resilience, was published by Scribe in 2021. The book is written in two parts, Black and Blue, which focus on her Aboriginality and time in the police respectively. The book received generally positive reviews. Meriki Onus in Australian Book Review called it "an enthralling book" and "a beautiful story of survival and family," and Jessie Tu in The Sydney Morning Herald declared that it "astonishes with its degree of truth, trauma and resilience" and that it "should be mandatory reading material for all emerging and current cops". Meanwhile, in a more negative review in Kill Your Darlings, Fernanda Dahlstrom remarked that "[g]reater exploration of how she came to abolitionism, and some signposting of where the story was going, would have strengthened this account of her struggle with racism and disadvantage from both sides of the law."

Her first play, "Nullung" ("paternal grandmother" in Gunai), based on an extract from Black and Blue about her grandmother, was presented as a play reading by Melbourne Theatre Company in 2021, the first known time the Gunai language was featured in a stage performance.

== Personal life ==
Gorrie has lived in various locations in Australia including Brisbane, Mount Isa, Toongabbie, Bundaberg, and Biloela. She left her partner, father of Nayuka, when she was 19, and went to stay with her parents in the suburb of Fitzroy in Melbourne. In 1995, she and her child(ren) travelled by bus from Gippsland to Bundaberg in Queensland. In July 2004 her partner left her, and she for safety reasons moved across central Queensland until the family landed in Brisbane, where they spent ten years while Nayuka was as an adolescent. As of 2021, she was living in Victoria.

Gorrie is also known as Veronica Heritage-Gorrie.

She has three children, Nayuka, Paul, and Likarri. Nayuka is a writer, actor and activist who has appeared on ABC's Black Comedy and Q+A.

== Recognition and awards ==
Black and Blue: A memoir of racism and resilience won both the Victorian Premier's Literary Award for Indigenous Writing and the Victorian Prize for Literature (Australia's richest literary award, with a A$100,000 prize) in 2022. It was also nominated for that year's Victorian Premier's Prize for Nonfiction, but lost to Amani Haydar's The Mother Wound.

It was shortlisted for the Douglas Stewart Prize for Non-Fiction at the 2022 New South Wales Premier's Literary Awards.

== Works ==
=== Books ===
==== Written ====
- Black and Blue: A Memoir of Racism and Resilience: 2021

==== Edited ====
- When Cops Are Criminals: 2024

=== Plays ===
- Nullung: 2021
