= Nayuka Gorrie =

Indigenous Australian writer and actor

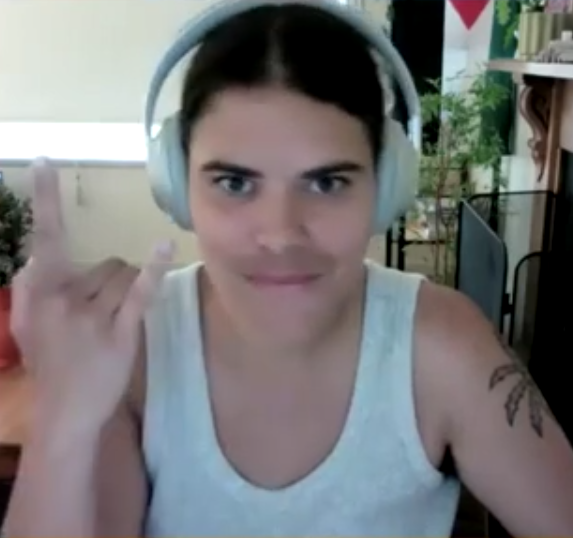
- Gorrie in 2023
- Born: Natalie Gorrie; 1990 (age 35–36) Victoria, Australia
- Notable works: Black Comedy
- Parents: Veronica Gorrie

Nayuka Gorrie (born 1990), formerly Natalie Gorrie, is an Australian writer, actor, and screenwriter. They are known for writing and performing in the third and fourth seasons of Black Comedy, for exploring their Black queer identity, feminist politics, and social commentary.

== Early life and education ==
Nayuka Gorrie was born in 1990 as Natalie Gorrie, born at the Mercy Hospital in East Melbourne. Their mother was a 19-year-old university student at the time. They are an Aboriginal person of Gunai (mother), Gunditjmara (paternal grandmother), Wiradjuri, and Yorta Yorta (both paternal grandfather) descent. They are the child of writer and former police officer Veronica Gorrie, whose father John Gorrie grew up at Lake Tyers Mission and was the first Aboriginal person to receive a Public Service Medal.

Gorrie moved around as a child. Their brother and sister were born in Moe. Aged 19, Veronica left Nayuka's father and went to stay with her parents in Fitzroy, Melbourne, with Nayuka. In 1995, Nayuka travelled with Veronica and 6-month-old baby sister by bus from Gippsland in Victoria to Bundaberg in Queensland, the home town of sister's stepfather, as Veronica married him. The family lived for some time in Biloela, central Queensland, where Veronica became a police officer. Gorrie later wrote "The longest I've lived in the same house was four years. I never stayed at a school longer than three". They spent ten years in Brisbane as an adolescent, and completed high school there. They have said that they were a nerd growing up, loved reading, and their favourite films were Matilda and The Matrix.

Their paternal grandfather was CEO of the Victorian Aboriginal Community Services Association Limited in Collingwood, and was friends with maternal grandfather John Gorrie. Nayuka did not grow up with their biological father, and although they spent time with him on occasional visits, the meetings brought on severe anxiety.

Gorrie moved to Melbourne aged 21 to attend university. As part of an internship program, they worked during the two long vacations for Australia Post as part of a legal team, in programs that included work place relations, acquisitions and mergers, and competition and consumer law. They also represented Victoria at the Congress Youth Forum of the National Congress of Australia's First Peoples.

At the age of 22, Gorrie was campaigning globally for Indigenous and environmental rights. They attended the 2012 United Nations Climate Change Conference an Indigenous representative of the Australian Youth Climate Coalition, and in May 2013 represented Indigenous youth at the UN Permanent Forum on Indigenous Issues held in New York City.

== Career ==
=== Published writing ===
Gorrie has written numerous opinion pieces and essays in various publications and website, including The Guardian, The Saturday Paper, Vice, Junkee, Archer magazine, The Lifted Brow, NITV, Kill Your Darlings, and The Sydney Morning Herald. Their essays have appeared in Queerstories (2018), Going Postal (2018), Growing Up Queer in Australia (2020) Animals make us human (2020), and Nothing to hide : voices of trans and gender diverse Australia (2022).

In August 2017, Gorrie wrote an opinion piece on the NITV website called "Being black and queer in Australia right now" in the lead-up to the same-sex marriage postal survey in Australia. They have also published opinion pieces on the Australia Day debate,

They also write satire, such as a 2017 piece called "A week in review: The diary of a reformed racist on Reconciliation Week".

As of 2021 they were writing a book of essays exploring contemporary colonialism.

=== Writing for TV ===
Gorrie wrote and performed in the third and fourth seasons of the ABC Television series Black Comedy (2018–2020). They also co-wrote several episodes of the second series of Get Krack!n.

Gorrie wrote for season two of the SBS drama The Heights, aired in 2020.

In 2020, Gorrie wrote for Thalu, a live-action children's TV series featuring a group of Indigenous children who are trying to save their community, directed by Hunter Page-Lochard and co-written by comedian David Woodhead, who had also featured in Black Comedy.

=== Other work ===
At the 2017 Melbourne Fringe, in partnership with the Koorie Heritage Trust, Gorrie produced a large event called Apocalypse in Blak, subtitled "An End of the World Party", in which the apocalypse was the colonisation of Australia. It featured artists in a range of disciplines, and included Carly Sheppard, Neil Morris, Meriki Onus, Dtarneen Onus Williams, Alice Skye, Paul Gorrie, and Sojugang!

== Media and festival appearances ==
In 2017, Gorrie gave an address at the Disrupted Festival of Ideas in Perth, entitled "What We Mean When We Talk About 'Ending White Supremacy'".

In May 2018 they appeared at the Melbourne Writers Festival along with Nakkiah Lui in a presentation called "How I Survived", in which they related how they managed to break into television comedy writing as Aboriginal and Torres Strait Islander women, and supported each other in the process.

In September 2019, Gorrie was one of a discussion panel at an event called "Recognition, Justice and Hope for Our Youth" at the Alfred Deakin Institute at Deakin University in Melbourne. Economist Jon Altman moderated, while the other two on the panel were Muriel Bamblett, child welfare advocate and former chair of SNAICC; and Justin Mohamed, Victorian Commissioner for Aboriginal Children and Young People.

In November 2019, they appeared on the ABC panel program Q+A aired in conjunction with Broadside, a feminist ideas festival presented by the Wheeler Centre. Others on the panel were Ashton Applewhite, Mona Eltahawy, Hana Assafiri, and Jess Hill. The program received a number of complaints and the episode was later removed from ABC iview streaming service. They appeared at the festival, their opening address titled "Things My Mother Never Told Me", which dealt with the ongoing impacts of the Stolen Generations, which includes the loss of language.

In March 2024, Gorrie moderated a session at Blak & Bright festival, featuring LGBTQIA+ writers Laniyuk, Kirli Saunders, and Stone Motherless Cold.

In May 2024, they appeared at an event called "Let It Bring Hope" at the Melbourne Writers Festival, paired with Palestinian poet Sara Saleh, in which they read their works of care and solidarity.

== Recognition ==
- 2018: Recipient, Wheeler Centre "The Next Chapter" recipient (a writing award), used to write a book of essays
- 2020: Named by Women's Agenda as one of "10 Indigenous women blazing a trail in Australia today"

== Personal life ==
Gorrie is non-binary and uses they/them pronouns. They learnt as an adolescent that they have Scheuermann's disease, which affects the spine.

In 2015, they left a six-and-a-half-year relationship and moved to the Melbourne suburb of Fitzroy. In 2017, Gorrie was living in Brisbane, but when they visited Melbourne, always gravitated towards Fitzroy, which they say has been a place of safety for Aboriginal people.

In a 2018 interview they spoke about the online abuse, including death threats, that Indigenous writers and public figures were frequently subjected to, saying that these are attempts to silence Indigenous voices in public discourse.

In August 2019, Gorrie announced they were pregnant. In November of that year, they gave birth to premature twins, who spent three months in a neonatal intensive care unit before being able to come home, just as the COVID-19 pandemic in Australia was starting. The family moved from Brunswick to a town in South Gippsland at the end of 2020.
