= Gorry =

Gorry is a surname. Notable people with the surname include:

- Charles Gorry (1878–1950), Australian cricketer
- G. Anthony Gorry, American computer scientist
- Katrina Gorry (born 1992), Australian women's soccer player
- Patrick Gorry (1896–1965), Irish politician

== See also ==
- Gorrie (disambiguation)
- Gorries (disambiguation)
- Lénaëlle Gilleron-Gorry (born 1995), French figure skater
- McGorry
