= Gunaikurnai people =

Aboriginal Australian nation of south-east Australia

kurnai
Kurnai
- Location of Gunaikurnai Country in Victoria

Total population
- 3000~

Languages
- Kurnai language, English

Religion
- Australian Aboriginal mythology, Christianity, Irreligion

Related ethnic groups
- see List of Indigenous Australian group names

The Kurnai (KUR-ny) people constitute an Aboriginal Australian nation of south-east Australia. They are the Traditional Custodians of most of present-day Gippsland and much of the southern slopes of the Victorian Alps. The Kurnai nation is composed of five major clans. During the 19th century, many Kurnai people resisted the incursions by early European squatters and subsequent settlers, resulting in a number of deadly confrontations, and massacres of the indigenous inhabitants. There are about 3,000 Kurnai people today, predominantly living in Gippsland. The Kurnai dialects are the traditional language of the Kurnai people, although there are very few fluent speakers now.

== Creation story ==
It is told that the first Kurnai came down from the north west mountains, with his canoe on his head. He was known as Borun, the pelican. He crossed the Tribal River (where Sale now stands) and walked on into the west to Tarra Warackel (Port Albert). He heard a constant tapping sound, as he walked, but could not identify it. At the deep water of the inlets Borun put down his canoe and discovered, much to his surprise, there was a woman in it. She was Tuk, the musk duck. He was very happy to see her and she became his wife and the mother of the Kurnai people.

== Archaeology ==
Cloggs Cave, near Buchan, was first frequented by people by about 23,000 years ago, while occupation at New Guinea Cave in the same area has been dated to over 20,000 years. In the 19th century, such caves were not used for residence; they were the domains of mulla-mullung, magic-workers of either sex. In Cloggs Cave, artifacts (sticks of Casuarina wood smeared with animal fat) of the type associated in the 19th century with GunaiKurnai death-magic rituals were found. Other features of the cave included broken stalactites and a grindstone (the fragments were also of ritual significance) and miniature fireplaces used for small fires of short duration; these indicate a continuity of ritual practice for at least 12,000 years.

== Clan names ==
The name of this Aboriginal nation has been alternatively written in such forms as Gunai, Kurnai, Gunnai, and Ganai. As a compromise, the group is now often referred to as the Gunaikurnai or Gunai/Kurnai. The names of clans or tribes have also attracted a number of alternative spellings. Alternative names arose as Aboriginal languages had no written form before European settlement. Thus Aboriginal words and tribal names can have many alternative spellings, as the oral transmission from the Indigenous people may have been heard or recorded differently by various early European sources. It is also possible that the European sources correctly recorded alternative pronunciations and dialects of the indigenous people.

== Clans and languages ==
The Kurnai nation is made up of five major clans or tribes. Various closely related dialects were spoken among the people of the region in pre-European times, although these have now been largely lost. Each clan spoke a different dialect with its own name, though these different names may largely reflect recording differences of early Europeans as discussed above. The clans are summarised in the table below:

Clan	Translation^{#}	General location	Tribal Country included...
Brataualung	"Men belonging to the place of fire" (unclear)	Throughout South Gippsland	Wilsons Promontory, along the coast east to Cape Liptrap and Tarwin Meadows, and west to Port Albert and as far as the mouth of Merriman Creek near Seaspray. Inland to about Mirboo. The Wilsons Promontory area was shared with the Boonwurrung people of the Kulin nation.
Braiakalung	"Men belonging to the west"	To the west of the Mitchell River, centred on the current site of Sale	Predominantly to the west of the Mitchell River, Lake Wellington and Providence Ponds, including the Avon and Latrobe Rivers. North-east to Mount Baw Baw and as far north as Mount Howitt in the Victorian Alps.
Brabiralung	"Belonging to men" or "belonging to manly men"	Central East Gippsland, mainly between the Mitchell and Tambo Rivers	The low-lying lands in the south around present day Bairnsdale and Bruthen. Up along the Mitchell, Nicholson, and Tambo Rivers into the low mountains of the Great Dividing Range between Swifts Creek and Omeo, and towards Dargo.
Tatungalung	"Belonging to the sea (or the south)", possibly "belonging to the sea in the south"	Around the Gippsland Lakes and along the coast west from Lakes Entrance	The Ninety Mile Beach from Lakes Entrance south-west to the mouth of Merriman Creek near Seaspray. Around Lake Victoria and Lake Wellington in the Gippsland Lakes, as well as Raymond Island in Lake King.
Krauatungalung	"Belonging to the east"	Centred on Orbost and the Snowy River	East along the coast as far as Point Hicks, and west to Lake Tyers Mission and Lakes Entrance. It included the Cann, Bemm, Brodribb, and Buchan Rivers, and inland to the mountains as far north as about Black Mountain near Wulgulmerang. Their inclusion as one of the Gunaikurnai is contested by Norman Tindale

=== Neighbouring nations ===
The Kurnai nation was bordered to the west of the Brataualung and Braiakalung by the lands of the Kulin nation centred on present day Melbourne, specifically the Wurundjeri and Boonwurrung clans. To the east, bordering the Krauatungalung from around Cann River and out to Mallacoota, were the Bidawal people. To the north, in the Australian Alps and around the upper Murray River, were a number of clans, including the Jaitmathang whose lands bordered the Brabawooloong south of Omeo.

According to European accounts, the Kurnai nation were actively fighting with the Boonwurrung at the time of European invasion. There are records of a "Warrowen massacre" in present-day Brighton which saw invading Kurnai warriors of the Borro Borro willun clan wipe out around 60 Boonwurrung Yowenjerre clan members, effectively eliminating the clan and allowing the Kurnai to occupy Boonwurrung lands near Wilsons Promontory. However, there is little record of the Borro Borro willun clan outside of this incident.

The Kurnai (and the Ngarigo of modern New South Wales) were reported to eat their enemies.

== Resistance to European settlement ==
The Kurnai people resisted the European invasion of their land. It is extremely difficult to ascertain the numbers killed in the guerilla warfare undertaken, or the numbers who died in the massacres that were inflicted upon the Gunaikurnai by the superior weaponry of the Europeans. A partial list from letters and diaries for an exhibition called Koorie, mounted by the Museum of Victoria in 1991, included:

- 1840 – Nuntin- unknown number killed by Angus McMillan's men
- 1840 – Boney Point – "Angus McMillan and his men took a heavy toll of Aboriginal lives"
- 1841 – Butchers Creek – 30-35 shot by Angus McMillan's men
- 1841 – Maffra – unknown number shot by Angus McMillan's men
- 1842 – Skull Creek – unknown number killed
- 1842 – Bruthen Creek – "hundreds killed"
- 1843 – Warrigal Creek – between 60 and 180 shot by Angus McMillan and his men
- 1844 – Maffra – unknown number killed
- 1846 – South Gippsland – 14 killed
- 1846 – Snowy River – 8 killed by Captain Dana and his Australian native police
- 1846-47 – Central Gippsland – 50 or more shot by armed party hunting for a white woman supposedly held by Aborigines. No such woman was ever found
- 1850 – East Gippsland – 15-20 killed
- 1850 – Murrindal – 16 poisoned
- 1850 – Brodribb River – 15-20 killed

In 1846, Gippsland squatters, Henry Meyrick, wrote in a letter to his relatives in England:

The blacks are very quiet here now, poor wretches. No wild beast of the forest was ever hunted down with such unsparing perseverance as they are. Men, women and children are shot whenever they can be met with ... I have protested against it at every station I have been in Gippsland, in the strongest language, but these things are kept very secret as the penalty would certainly be hanging ... For myself, if I caught a black actually killing my sheep, I would shoot him with as little remorse as I would a wild dog, but no consideration on earth would induce me to ride into a camp and fire on them indiscriminately, as is the custom whenever the smoke is seen. They [the Aborigines] will very shortly be extinct. It is impossible to say how many have been shot, but I am convinced that not less than 500 have been murdered altogether.

In 1863, Reverend Friedrich Hagenauer established Rahahyuck Mission on the banks of the Avon River, near Lake Wellington, to house the Gunaikurnai survivors from west and central Gippsland. The mission sought to discourage all tribal ritual and culture. It closed in 1908 and the few remaining residents were moved to the Lake Tyers Mission.

== Native title agreement ==
The Kurnai launched a native title claim in 1997 following on from the successful Mabo native title case of 1992. On 22 October 2010 the case was settled in the Federal Court under the Native Title Act (1993). The Court recognised the Gunaikurnai as traditional owners, and found that they held native title over much of Gippsland. Based on these findings the Victorian Government entered into an agreement with the Gunaikurnai on the same day, the first agreement reached under the Traditional Owner Settlement Act (2010)

Maps of the area covered under the agreement and the native title determination shows that it does not fully cover the entire area thought to comprise the traditional lands of the Gunaikurnai, however most of the original nation is covered. Notable exclusions are to the west, including Wilsons Promontory, to the east of the Snowy River, and exclusions in the north, particularly the northeast region. Also included as part of the settlement is 200 metres (660 ft) offshore into the sea. Only Crown land within the area is affected by the determination and agreement, with all existing rights on Crown land being protected for their full term, and there being no impact in any way in relation to private land.

The agreement included the following key points:

- ten national parks and reserves were transferred to the Gunaikurnai to be jointly managed with the State. The parks and reserves are The Knob Reserve at Stratford, Tarra-Bulga National Park, Mitchell River National Park, The Lakes National Park, Gippsland Lakes Coastal Park, New Guinea Cave in the Snowy River National Park, Buchan Caves Reserve, Land in the Lake Tyers catchment area, Gippsland Lakes Reserve at Raymond Island, and Corringle Foreshore Reserve at the mouth of the Snowy River.
- the Gunaikurnai people have rights to access and use Crown land for traditional purposes within existing laws. These uses can include hunting, fishing, camping, and gathering.
- funding to be provided to the Gunaikurnai for the purposes of managing their affairs, for investment in economic development and strengthening of their cultural identity, and to meet their obligations under the settlement. The total value of the funding is A$12 million, contributed to equally by the State and Federal Governments. $2 million was to be paid to Gunaikurnai at the time the settlement came into force, with the remaining $10 million invested through an independent trust to provide income for purposes outlined previously for a period of at least twenty years.

== Places named after the Gunaikurnai ==
- Kurnai College is a Victorian state school in the Latrobe Valley of Gippsland, which is in the western part of the Gunaikurnai's traditional nation, in the lands of the Brayakooloong clan. It has campuses in the towns of Morwell and Churchill.
- Krowathunkooloong Keeping Place is an Aboriginal culture, history and heritage museum located in Bairnsdale in Brabawooloong country. It is named for the Krowathunkooloong clan that occupied the Orbost and Snowy River area. It houses displays related to Aboriginal culture, history, arts and crafts, with the aim of raising the profile, awareness, understanding and pride in the Gunaikurnai people's history in Gippsland. The museum was first named in 1991 and opened to the public in 1994.

== Notable Gunaikurnai people ==
- John Gorrie (born 1950), Aboriginal liaison officer, child protection worker and elder
- Ricky Harrison (born 1959), musician from Aboriginal band No Fixed Address
- Veronica 'Ronnie' Gorrie (born 1971/1972), writer
- Nayuka Gorrie (born 1990), writer and activist
- Albert Mullet (1933-2014), community leader and craftsman
- Lidia Thorpe, Victorian Greens Politician, former MP for Northcote. First Aboriginal woman elected to the Parliament of Victoria.

== See also ==
- Alfred William Howitt
- Gippsland massacres
- Gunaikurnai language
- Warrigal Creek
- White woman of Gippsland

== Sources ==
- "Agreements with Traditional Owners: Gunaikurnai Settlement Agreement". Official site. Department of Sustainability and Environment. 1 October 2012.
- Clark, Ian D. (14 July 2006). "Aboriginal Language Areas in Victoria: A Report to the Victorian Aboriginal Corporation For Languages" (PDF). Archived from the original (PDF) on 21 July 2013.
- "The five clans of the Kurnai". Bataluk Cultural Trail website. Gippsland and East Gippsland Aboriginal Co-operative.
- Flood, Josephine (2004). Archaeology of the Dreamtime. Marleston: J.B Publishing. p. 25. ISBN 1-876622-50-4.
- "Gunai and Kurnai, Koorie and Koori". Bataluk Cultural Trail website. Gippsland and East Gippsland Aboriginal Co-operative.
- "Gunaikurnai Native Title Agreement Fact Sheets and Related Material". Department of Justice. November 2010a.
- "Gunaikurnai Native Title Agreement FAQs". Department of Justice. 27 February 2013. Archived from the original on 19 April 2013.
- "Gunaikurnai native title agreement; Determination Area Map" (PDF). Department of Justice. November 2010b.
- Morey, Stephen (2016). "Two traditional stories in the Ganai language of Gippsland". In Austin, Peter K.; Koch, Harold; Simpson, Jane (eds.). Language, land & song: Studies in honour of Luise Hercus (PDF). Aboriginal History. pp. 378–391. ISBN 978-0-728-60406-3.
- "Gunaikurnai Native Title Settlement Agreement (Map)" (PDF). Official site. Department of Sustainability and Environment. 22 August 2011. Archived from the original (PDF) on 30 March 2012.
- "Krowathunkooloong, Brabawooloong Country, The Keeping Place (Bairnsdale)". Bataluk Cultural Trail website. Gippsland and East Gippsland Aboriginal Co-operative.
- Raue, Ben; agencies (18 November 2017). "Northcote byelection: Greens' Lidia Thorpe takes Melbourne seat from Labor". The Guardian. ISSN 0261-3077.

== Bibliography ==
- Gardiner, P.D. (1990). Our Founding Murdering Father: Angus McMillan and the Kurnai tribe. Ngarak Press. ISBN 1-875254-01-3.
- Gardiner, P.D. (1994). Through Foreign Eyes: European perceptions of the Kurnai Tribes of Gippsland. Ngarak Press. ISBN 1-875254-13-7.
- Gardiner, P.D. (1996). The language of the Kurnai Tribes of Gippsland. Ngarak Press. ISBN 1-875254-19-6.
- Gardiner, P.D. (2001). Gippsland Massacres: The Destruction of the Kurnai tribes 1800-1860. Ngarak Press. ISBN 1-875254-11-0.
