= Krauatungalang =

Indigenous Australian people

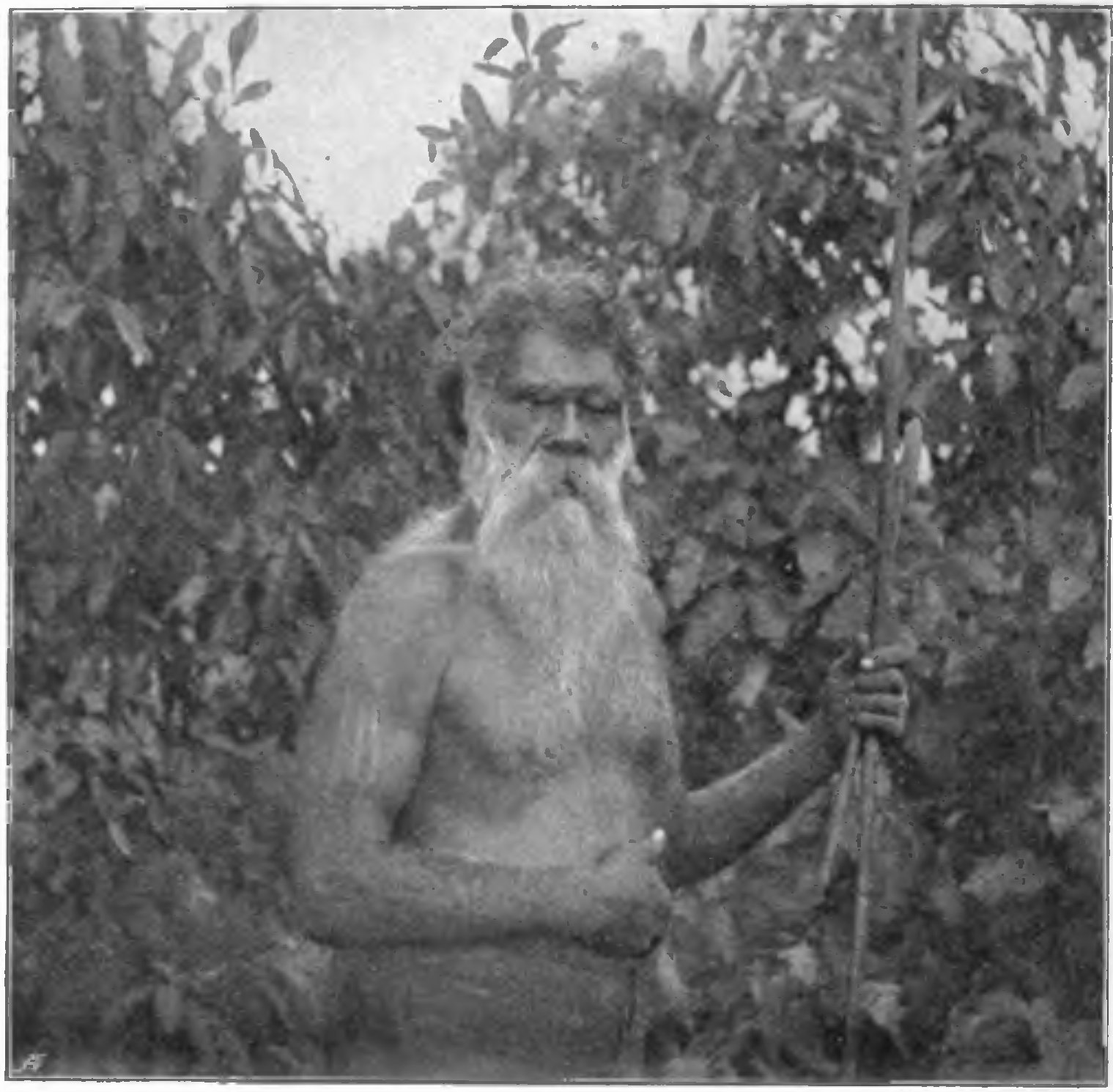
One of the Krauatungalung, c. 1904.

The Krauatungalung are an Indigenous Australian people, of East Gippsland, in the state of Victoria, Australia. They are regarded as a group of the Kurnai, though Tindale states that their inclusion as one of the Gunai is artificial.

== Name ==
According to Alfred William Howitt the ethnonym Krauatungalung is composed of krauat (east) and -galung, a suffix meaning 'of'/'belonging to'. The name they referred to themselves by is Mukdhang, meaning 'good (mak) speech' (ðang).

== Country ==
The Krauatungalung country traditionally encompassed 5,700 square kilometres (2,200 sq mi) of tribal territory, from Cape Everard (Point Hicks) to Lakes Entrance. It covers several rivers, the Cann, Brodribb, Buchan, and the Snowy River. Its inland boundary is at the Black Mountain.

== Alternative names ==
- Gunggala-dhang, the Bidawal exonym for the Krauatungalung
- Karnathun (composed of ngatban (no) and ka:nai (man))
- Krauatun-kurnai
- Kroatungolung
- Krow-ithun-koolo
- Krowathun-Koolung
- Muk-dhang
- Thangkwai (Thangguai/Thang quai), another exonym, meaning 'rough speech'

Source: Tindale 1974

== Notable people ==
- John Gorrie (born 1950), Aboriginal liaison officer, child protection worker and elder
- Veronica Gorrie (born 1971/1972), writer

== Sources ==
- Clark, Ian D. (14 July 1996). Aboriginal Language Areas In Victoria: A Report to the Victorian Aboriginal Corporation For Languages. Victorian Aboriginal Corporation For Languages.
- Dixon, R. M. W. (2002). Australian Languages: Their Nature and Development. Cambridge University Press.
- Gaughwin, Denise; Sullivan, Hilary (1984). McBryde, Isabel (ed.). "Aboriginal boundaries and movement in Western Port, Victoria" (PDF). Aboriginal History. 8 (1): 80–98. ISSN 0314-8769.
- Howitt, A. W. (1886). "On the Migrations of the Kurnai Ancestors". The Journal of the Anthropological Institute of Great Britain and Ireland. 15: 419–420.
- Howitt, A. W. (2010) [First published 1904]. The Native Tribes of South-East Australia. Cambridge University Press. pp. 73–74. ISBN 978-1-108-00632-3.
- Tindale, Norman Barnett (1974). "Krauatungalung (VIC)". Aboriginal Tribes of Australia: Their Terrain, Environmental Controls, Distribution, Limits, and Proper Names. Australian National University Press. ISBN 978-0-708-10741-6.
