= Raymond Island =

Island in Victoria, Australia

- Town
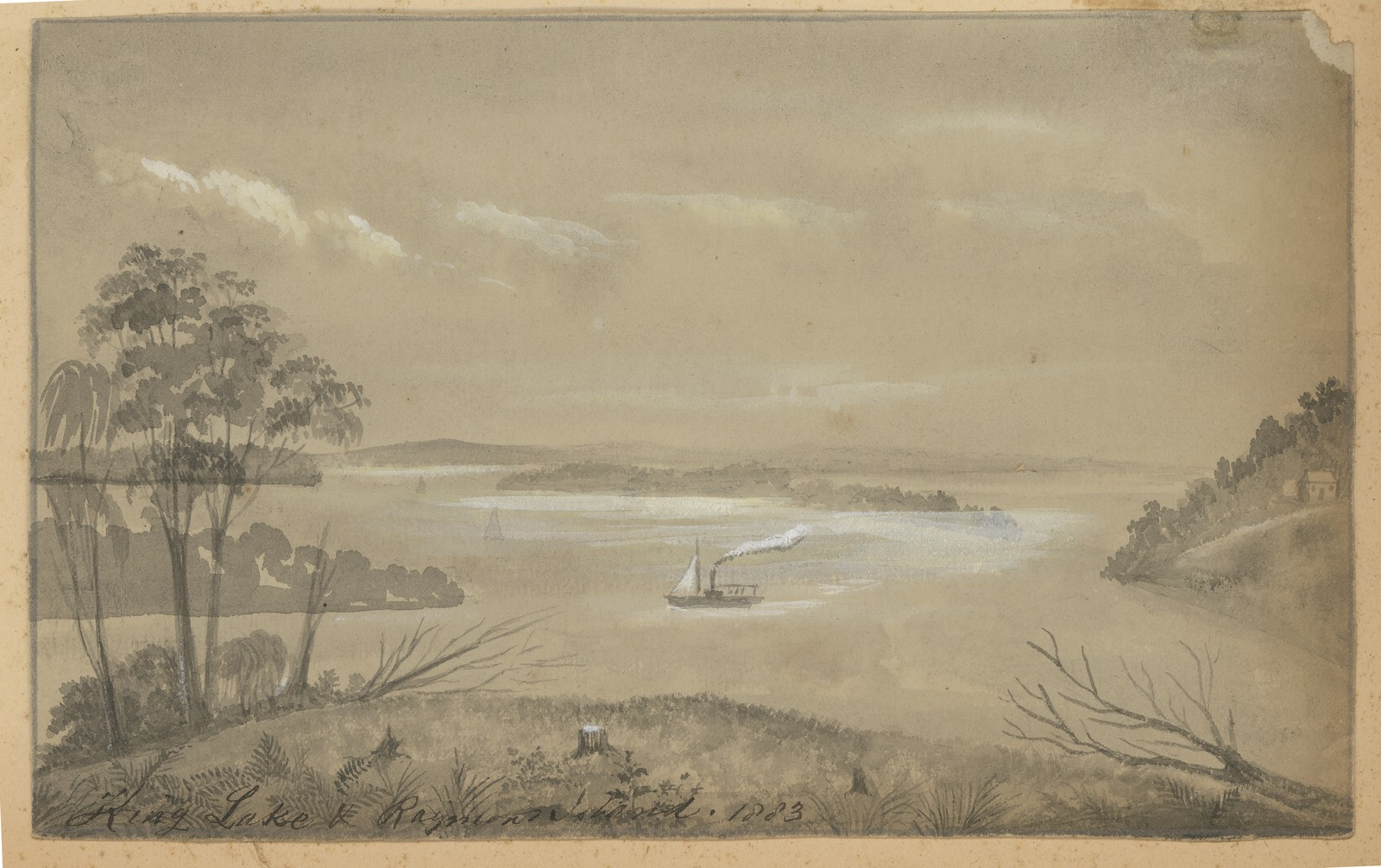
- King Lake and Raymond Island, 1883, Daniel Long State Library Victoria

- Interactive map of Raymond Island
- Coordinates: 37°55′0″S 147°44′0″E
- Country: Australia
- State: Victoria
- LGA: Shire of East Gippsland
- Location: 293 km (182 mi) E of Melbourne; 79 km (49 mi) NE of Sale; 18 km (11 mi) SE of Bairnsdale
- Established: 1884 (Township)

Government
  - State electorate: Gippsland East
  - Federal division: Gippsland

Population
  - Total: 589 (2021 census)
- Postcode: 3880

Raymond Island (Gunai/Kurnai language: Bunjil-baul) is a town located on a small island in the Gippsland Lakes in eastern Victoria, Australia, about 300 km (190 miles) from Melbourne. The island is approximately 6 km (3.7 miles) long by 2 km (1.2 miles) wide, with an area of approximately 7.5 square kilometres (2.9 square miles). It is just 200 m (660 ft) off the coast, across from the town of Paynesville. The island is named after William Odell Raymond, originally a magistrate from New South Wales, who established himself as a squatter in Gippsland in the 1840s.

Raymond Island is well known locally for its large koala population, originally introduced to the island in 1953, and for the Raymond Island Ferry, a chain ferry that links the island to Paynesville on the mainland.

== Raymond Island Ferry ==
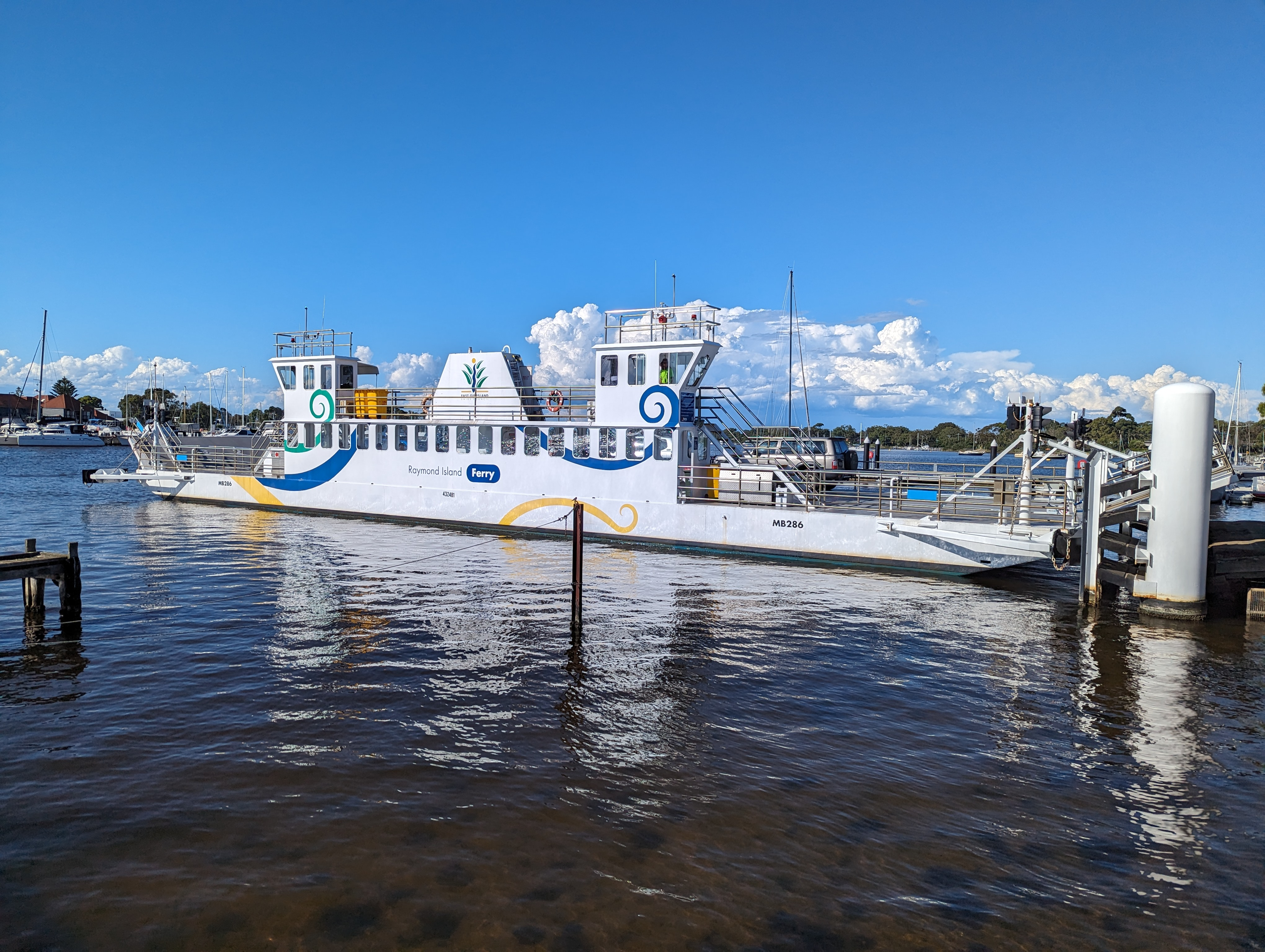
Raymond Island Ferry, docked at Raymond Island.

The Raymond Island Ferry, operated by the East Gippsland Shire Council, provides the only link between the island and the mainland, but also acts as an effective barrier to faster development of the island community. A ferry has run between Paynesville and Raymond Island since 1889, and has been an integral and sometimes controversial feature of life on Raymond Island. Some continue to call for the ferry to be replaced by a bridge, but others believe the ferry is an integral part of life on the island.

In 2011, the East Gippsland Shire Council conducted another review of "Raymond Island Access", based on an action in the Council Plan 2009–2013 to "develop a plan to resolve access to Raymond Island". That followed earlier studies which supported the maintenance of the existing ferry service (e.g., in 2003). Before the inauguration of the current chain ferry in 1997, the topic was the subject of an academic paper in the Rural Society Journal, which examined "the controversy over the proposal to link Raymond Island, Victoria to the mainland through construction of a bridge, to replace the current ferry service". Opinions remain divided about the relative merits of a ferry and a bridge.

== Raymond Island Institutions ==
The Raymond Island Community Association (RICA) hosts regular meetings for residents and ratepayers, and has roots that go back to 1949. The RICA was formed in 2003 as an amalgamation of the Raymond Island Advancement League (RIAL) which was started in 1949, and Raymond Island Protection (RIP) which was formed in 1988.

The Raymond Island Landcare Group formed in 1994 and reportedly covers 759 hectares. Its stated mission is to "protect and enhance the natural environment of Raymond Island by maintaining and protecting the natural attractions of the Island and development of low impact tourism infrastructure in harmony with maintaining the Island's character".

At one stage, thanks to the work of Reg Medling and Gordon Winch, Raymond Island had its own bowling green at the Medwin Bowling Club. With the help of volunteers, a two-rink green was created on a vacant block of land owned by Gordon and Beryl Winch, at 7-15 Eighth Avenue, just down from First Parade. The green officially opened on 15 February 1987, but no longer exists.

Raymond Island briefly had a Post Office from 3 April 1967 until 11 April 1968. It was run by Annette Anderson, who operated it from a small hut at the back of her home. The post office closed when Mrs. Anderson tendered her resignation upon moving away from the island.

More long-lived was the Raymond Island primary school (number 3384), which opened to students on 14 February 1902. The site of the school is on the corner of Gravelly Point Road and Centre Road, marked by a commemorative plaque. The first Head Teacher was Mrs Jemima Thompson, who received a dispensation to teach as a married women. At one stage, student enrolments reached 41 but, by 1912, enrolments had fallen to the point that the school closed on 31 August. However just 18 months later, on 27 January 1914, an influx of new students led to its reopening. Only 28 new enrolments were recorded between 1914 and 1934, resulting in the closure of the school for the final time in December 1934. After closing, the old school building was removed to Devon Road, Paynesville, where it became a private home.

In 1897, Fred Barton (snr) held the first Presbyterian church service on Raymond Island, in a private home. Barton applied to the Lands Department for a church site soon after, and obtained three acres on the corner of Gravelly Point Road and Centre Road, opposite what would become the school site. A bark hut was built on the site, and services were held there until the church and Sunday School were removed to the newly built school in 1902.
