= Gippsland massacres =

Series of mass murders of the Gunai Kurnai people in Victoria, Australia

Gippsland (Australia)

The Gippsland massacres were a series of mass murders of Gunai Kurnai people, an Aboriginal Australian people living in East Gippsland, Victoria, committed by European settlers and the Aboriginal Police during the Australian frontier wars.

== History ==
The perpetrators often did not record or speak about their actions for fear of prosecution and the death penalty under colonial law, as happened after the Myall Creek massacre. The names of many of the perpetrators remain on the rivers, roads and islands of Gippsland. Scots pastoralist Angus McMillan played a significant role in the massacres of Gippsland in retribution for the murder of a fellow pastoralist by the Gurnai Kurnai people.

Gippsland squatter Henry Meyrick wrote in a letter home to his relatives in England in 1846:

The blacks are very quiet here now, poor wretches. No wild beast of the forest was ever hunted down with such unsparing perseverance as they are. Men, women and children are shot whenever they can be met with … I have protested against it at every station I have been in Gippsland, in the strongest language, but these things are kept very secret as the penalty would certainly be hanging … For myself, if I caught a black actually killing my sheep, I would shoot him with as little remorse as I would a wild dog, but no consideration on earth would induce me to ride into a camp and fire on them indiscriminately, as is the custom whenever the smoke is seen. They [the Aborigines] will very shortly be extinct. It is impossible to say how many have been shot, but I am convinced that not less than 450 have been murdered altogether.

The following list of massacres was compiled by settlers from white perpetrator sources such as letters and diaries, and thus does not take into account knowledge passed by word-of-mouth by the Gunai Kurnai people.

1840 - Nuntin- unknown number murdered by Angus McMillan's men
1840 - Boney Point - "Angus McMillan and his men took a heavy toll of Aboriginal lives"
1841 - Butchers Creek (now known as Boxes Creek, Metung) - 30-35 shot by Angus McMillan's men
1841 - Maffra - unknown number shot by Angus McMillan's men
1842 - Skull Creek - unknown number murdered
1842 - Bruthen Creek - "hundreds murdered"
1843 - Warrigal Creek - up to 150 people shot by Angus McMillan and his men
1844 - Maffra - unknown number murdered
1846 - South Gippsland - 14 murdered
1846 - Snowy River - 8 murdered by Captain Dana and the Aboriginal Police
1846-47 - Central Gippsland - 50 or more shot by armed party hunting for a white woman supposedly held by Aborigines; no such woman was ever found.
1850 - East Gippsland - 15-20 murdered
1850 - Murrindal - 16 poisoned
1850 - Brodribb River - 15-20 murdered

In 2020, the Wellington Shire Council voted against removing the monuments to Angus McMillan.

== See also ==
- List of massacres in Australia
- List of massacres of Indigenous Australians
