= John Gorrie (elder) =

- Born: John Anthony Gorrie; 10 March 1950 (age 76); Victoria, Australia
- Occupations: Public servant, Indigenous advocate
- Children: Veronica Gorrie

John Anthony Gorrie PSM (born 10 March 1950) is the first Aboriginal Australian person awarded the Public Service Medal, in 2005.

== Early life and education ==
John Anthony Gorrie was born on 10 March 1950 to single mother and Gunaikurnai woman Linda, and was placed in the Royal Park children's home in Melbourne. The authorities returned him to her after she married Carl Turner and applied for custody, and he grew up with her at Lake Tyers Mission, an Aboriginal reserve.

He is a Kurnai elder of the Krauatungalung clan, whose traditional lands are located in East Gippsland in Victoria.

He has positive memories of his childhood there, including movie nights, his friends, and swimming in the lake. However, his mother remained fearful of the authorities, and would hide him whenever inspectors visited Lake Tyers.

== Career ==
Gorrie started work as an Aboriginal liaison and advocacy officer and in the Victorian Department of Human Services in 1991, and was the only Indigenous worker there when he began. He continued to work at the department, completing 21 years at the end of 2011.

== Recognition ==
After working for 14 years in the field of child protection, he was given the Public Service Medal "for outstanding public service in improving the relationship between the Department of Human Services and the Aboriginal community". As a result of his work, new programs were created by the department, and Aboriginal people's interactions with the department improved. The number of Indigenous employees had increased to 20 by 2011.

== Personal life ==
As of 2023 Gorrie was living in Sale, and continues to visit Lake Tyers, which he still considers as "home". His mother and father are buried in the New Cemetery there.

His daughter is writer Veronica Gorrie, and his grandchild is writer, actor and activist Nayuka Gorrie.
