= Angus McMillan =

Australian colonialist leader

Member of the Victorian Legislative Assembly for Gippsland South
- In office 1 October 1859 – 1 November 1860
- Preceded by: Seat established
- Succeeded by: George Hedley

Personal details
- Born: 14 August 1810 Glen Brittle, Scotland
- Died: 18 May 1865 (aged 54) Iguana Creek, near Bairnsdale, Victoria
- Resting place: Sale, Victoria
- Spouse: Christina MacDougald
- Children: Two sons
- Occupation: Explorer, pastoralist
- Known for: European colonisation, Gippsland massacres

Angus McMillan (14 August 1810 – 18 May 1865) was a Scottish-born explorer, pioneer pastoralist, and perpetrator of several of the Gippsland massacres of Gunai people.

Arriving first in New South Wales in 1838, McMillan rose swiftly in Australian colonial society as a skilled explorer. His explorations led to the opening of the Gippsland region for pastoralism, displacing the Gunai Aboriginal people who were the traditional owners of the land. Relations between McMillan and the Gunai reached their nadir in 1843 when, in retribution for the murder of a fellow pastoralist and the killing of livestock, McMillan led the first of several armed assaults culminating in the massacre of between 60 and 150 people at Warrigal Creek. The massacre had no impact on McMillan's relations with other colonists and he went on to become a successful Gippsland pastoralist himself, with more than 150,000 acres (61,000 ha) of property. However a series of poor financial decisions brought him to near-bankruptcy in the 1860s. Forced to return to exploration and surveying, he was badly injured in an accident near Dargo, Victoria, and died on 18 May 1865.

McMillan is commemorated in public art and place names in Gippsland, including, until 2018, the Division of McMillan in Australia's Federal Parliament. In 2018, the Australian Electoral Commission announced the Division would be renamed, following a community campaign against honouring a man involved in massacring Gunai people.

== Early life ==
Angus McMillan was born in Glen Brittle, Isle of Skye, Scotland, the fourth son of Ewan McMillan, a sheep farmer. After an early life of hardship and deprivation, both in Glen Brittle and subsequently at Kilbride Farm, South Uist, he migrated to Australia in 1838. Under the initial employ of Captain Lachlan Macalister, he gained experience of Australian pastoralism on the Monaro, New South Wales before moving to manage the Currawang station near Delegate.

== Exploration ==
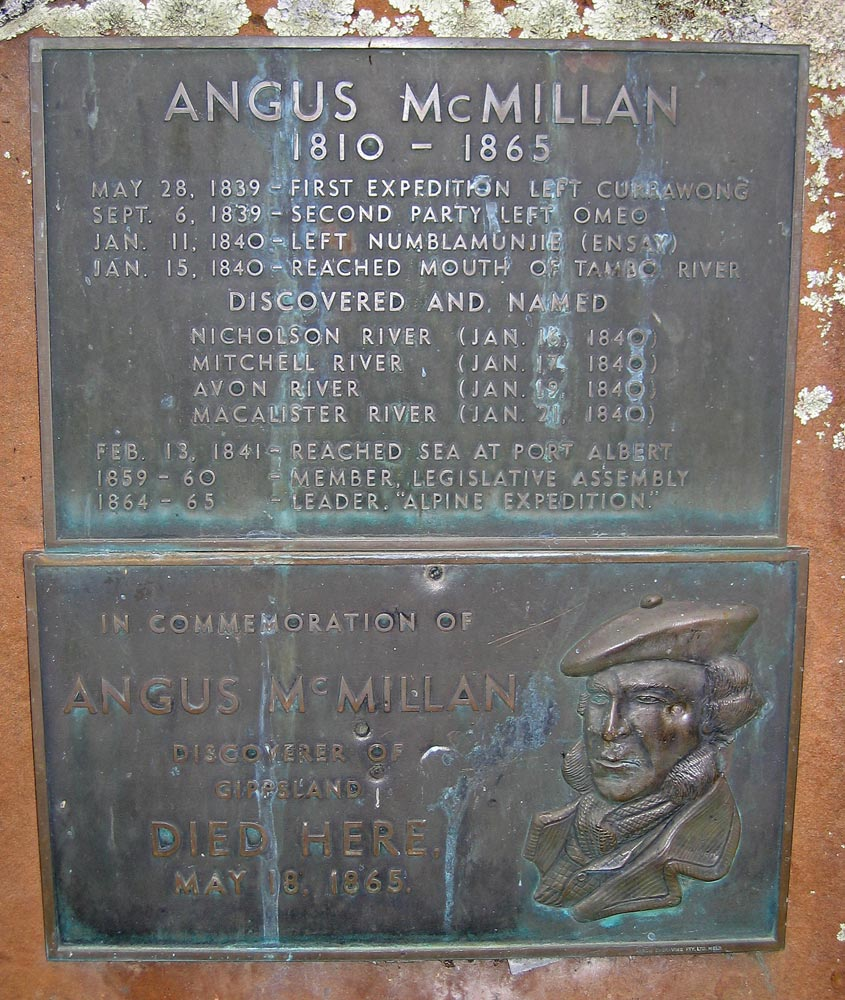
Memorial cairn at Iguana Creek on the Dargo Road, listing dates of McMillan's major expeditions

By the late 1830s, wealthy landholders in New South Wales had become interested in the Gippsland region of Victoria and funded exploration of the region. Macalister knew the early settlers in the high country of Gippsland around Benambra and Omeo as they too were from the Monaro. He put forward McMillan as a candidate to further explore the plains of Gippsland proper nearer to the coast. A second interest sent Polish scientist-explorer Count Paul Strzelecki to also explore Gippsland.

=== Expedition to Omeo ===
On 28 May 1839 McMillan travelled south on his first exploration of the Gippsland plains, accompanied by Jimmy Gabber, an elder of the Monaro people. The expedition was unsuccessful; in a letter to colonial administrator Charles La Trobe, McMillan reported that six days after leaving Currawong, Gabber declined to go further for fear of encountering the Gunai people, Gippsland's indigenous inhabitants. McMillan refused to turn back, whereupon Gabber waited for a quiet moment and attempted to kill McMillan with a club. Gabber retreated when McMillan raised his pistol, but still refused to go on.

McMillan therefore continued alone, heading west towards Buchan and Omeo. No significant agricultural lands or watercourses were discovered along McMillan's path, and neither did he encounter the region's indigenous inhabitants, the Gunai people. After two weeks in Omeo, McMillan returned northeast across the plains to Currawong.

=== Expedition to Sale ===
Despite the apparent failure of this first expedition, Macalister remained optimistic about pastoral opportunities in Gippsland. At Macalister's urging McMillan commenced a second expedition in December 1839, moving southwest by west across the plains towards the existing settlement of Sale. On his return to Currawang in early 1840, he reported to Macalister that he crossed several watercourses draining toward the east, each surrounded by fine potential grazing land. McMillan had named them as the Nicholson, the Mitchell, the Avon and Macalister rivers. He had also promptly contacted colonial officials, to register claims along the Avon River for cattle stations in his own and Macalister's names.

=== Subsequent expeditions ===
McMillan completed several more expeditions over the following two years. While he was not necessarily the first to visit many locations, his explorations were the most important in terms of European settlement of Gippsland proper. In 1841, on the final of his early expeditions, he located a suitable port for the region, at present day Port Albert.

The route established then by McMillan varies substantially from the current major north–south route through Gippsland today. McMillan travelled further west along the ranges than the current Great Alpine Road. This route follows the Great Alpine Road south through the Tambo Valley to Bruthen, then West to Bairnsdale and Sale along the Princes Highway, then south from Sale to Port Albert. For several decades, Gippsland operated essentially on this north–south axis, following this route from Benambra and Omeo to Port Albert, but, in the 1860s, a road was opened from Melbourne to the east, and this was followed a couple of decades later by a rail line. These developments, along with development of significant east–west shipping on the Gippsland Lakes at the time, reoriented travel and transport to the simpler east–west axis, and demoted the Benambra and Omeo regions to a side branch of this main route.

=== Gippsland massacres ===
Increasing European settlement in Gippsland dispossessed the indigenous Gunai people, who were progressively forced off their land to make way for pastoral activities. Clashes had occurred for some decades prior to McMillan's explorations but relations between Europeans and the Gunai reached their nadir in 1843 when McMillan's colleague Macalister was killed by an Aboriginal man. In retaliation McMillan organised an armed assault on the Gunaikurnai people leading to the massacre of between 60 and 150 Aboriginal people at Warrigal Creek. Violence between the Indigenous population and European settlers continued until the 1860s.

McMillan was the leader of the "Highland Brigade", a group of Gaelic-speaking men who undertook reprisal raids on the Gunaikurnai.

McMillan was the source of the White woman of Gippsland rumour, with a letter he wrote to the Sydney Morning Herald on 28 December 1840, which facilitated settler reprisals against the Gunaikurnai people.

== Later life ==
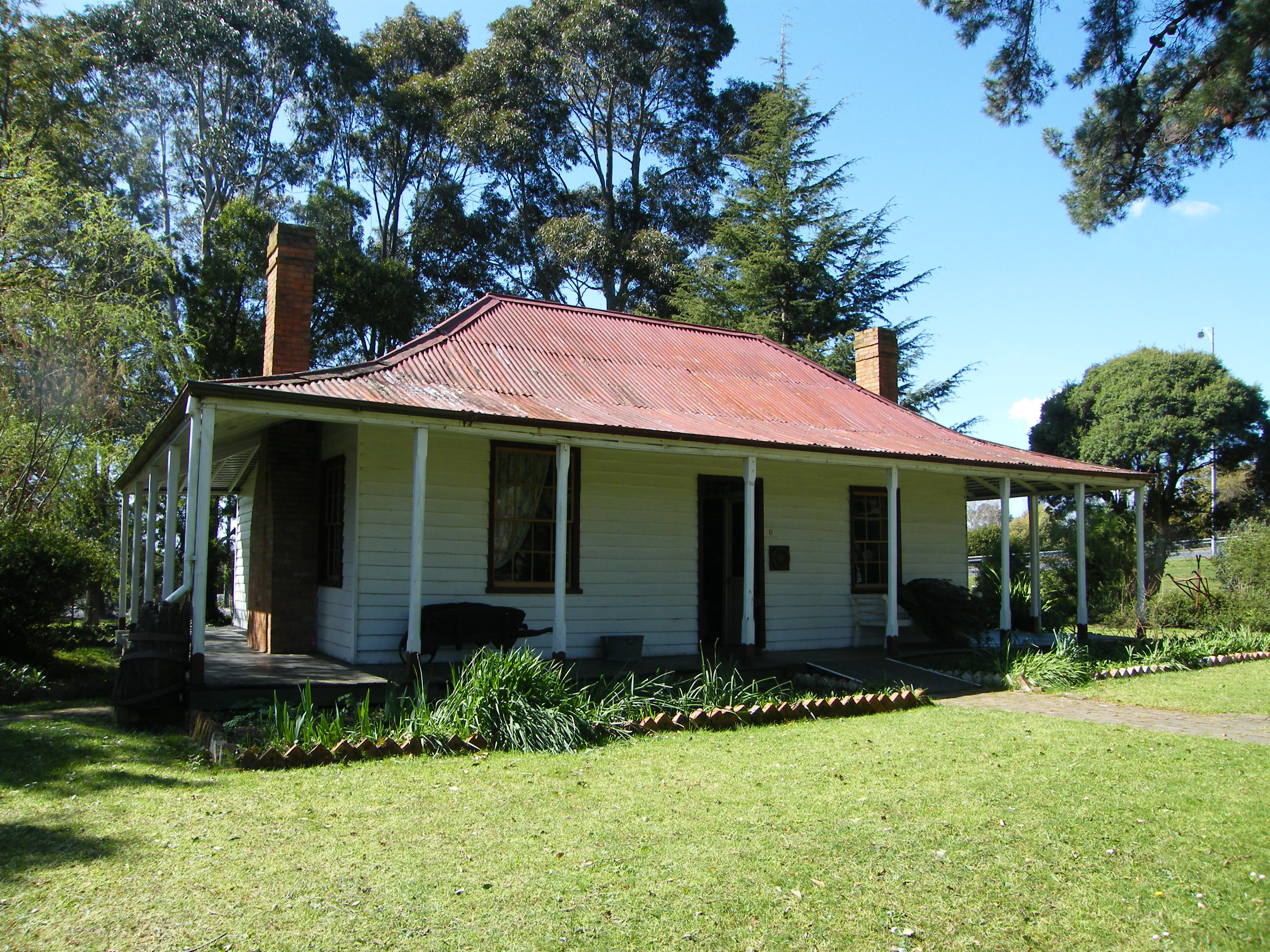
"Bushy Park," McMillan's home along the Avon River. Relocated to Old Gippstown in 1969

His explorations at an end, McMillan established himself as an independent squatter on land along the Avon River which he named "Bushy Park." Development was slow, with an 1845 census of the region showing only six acres under cultivation and livestock comprising 600 head of cattle and six horses. McMillan persisted, and, by the 1856 census, he was recorded as the owner of 150,000 acres, upon which he ran the region's second-largest holding of sheep and third-largest of cattle. In the same year, "Bushy Park" itself was recorded as an eight-room home attached to a four-room cottage, adjacent to a stable, wool store, barn, a worker's hut and a six-acre orchard.

In 1857, McMillan married a local woman, Christina MacDougald. They had two sons. From October 1859 to November 1860, he was a member of the Legislative Assembly for South Gippsland, less than a decade after Victoria was first declared a separate colony. His properties had generated substantial wealth, but by 1861 a series of poor financial decisions coupled with devastating bushfires, had left him in debt. The bulk of his Gippsland properties were sold and by the end of the year his only holding was the land immediately surrounding his Bushy Park home.

In need of money, in 1864, McMillan acceded to a request from the Victorian Government to lead a team of men into Gippsland's alpine region with the aim of mapping and clearing tracks to support local mining operations. Within six months McMillan and his men had constructed more than 220 miles (350 km) of track through rugged terrain near Omeo and Dargo. It was to be McMillan's last expedition; in May 1865 he was clearing a track near Dargo when a pack-horse slipped and fell, crushing him beneath it. McMillan was carried to the public house in Iguana Creek, suffering serious internal injuries. He died on 18 May and was buried in the public cemetery in Sale.

== Legacy ==
McMillan's death left his wife and sons destitute, until a public outcry at their plight forced the Victorian Government to come to their aid with a gratuity of £2000. His feats as an explorer were the subject of public testimonials.

McMillan's Bushy Park homestead was preserved, and was relocated to Old Gippstown in Moe, Victoria, in 1969.

McMillan's earlier reputation as a pioneering explorer has been tarnished since his role in the murders of Aboriginal people became more widely known. In the late 1970s, historian Peter Gardner highlighted McMillan's key role in the frontier conflicts, in particular the Warrigal Creek massacre. In the 1980s, historian Don Watson highlighted his role as leader of the Highland Brigade.

His great-great-niece, Cal Flyn, added to these accounts in her book Thicker than Water (2016), a memoir and historical account of what she discovered after researching his deeds. He has been dubbed "the butcher of Gippsland".

In 1948, the Federal Division of McMillan was proclaimed in his honour, covering western Gippsland. The first elections in the new electorate were held in 1949. Submissions were made to the Australian Electoral Commission redistributions of Victoria in 2002 and 2010 to have the name changed. In March 2016, Russell Broadbent, the sitting Member for McMillan, agreed with Greens and Labor candidates for McMillan that the electorate should be renamed at the next electoral redistribution, due to McMillan's well-documented massacres of local Aboriginal people. In 2018, the Australian Electoral Commission renamed the federal seat Division of Monash.

Nineteen monuments honouring McMillan exist in Gippsland, including at Wellington, Heyfield, Yarram, Omeo and Lucknow. After considering 240 community submissions in the wake of the Black Lives Matter movement, which included about half in favour of removing two stone cairns dedicated to McMillan on land owned by the Wellington Shire Council, the Council voted against the move on 17 June 2020.

Amateur historian Rob Christie challenged Peter Gardner's conclusions about McMillan in his book A Convenient Scapegoat: Angus McMillan and the Gippsland Massacres, arguing that McMillan, while involved, was not the instigator or prime mover of the atrocities. In turn, Gardner criticised Christie's interpretations as relying on cherry picking and straw man arguments.

== Sources ==
- Bride, T.F. (Ed) (1899) Letters from Victorian pioneers. Melbourne.
- Gardner, P.D. (1990). Our Founding Murdering Father: Angus McMIllan and the Kurnai Tribe of Gippsland 1839-1865. Ngarak Press. ISBN 9781875254019.
- Morgan, P. (1997) The Settling of Gippsland: A Regional History. Traralgon: Gippsland Municipalities Association.
