= Gippsland =

Gippsland Region
- Region
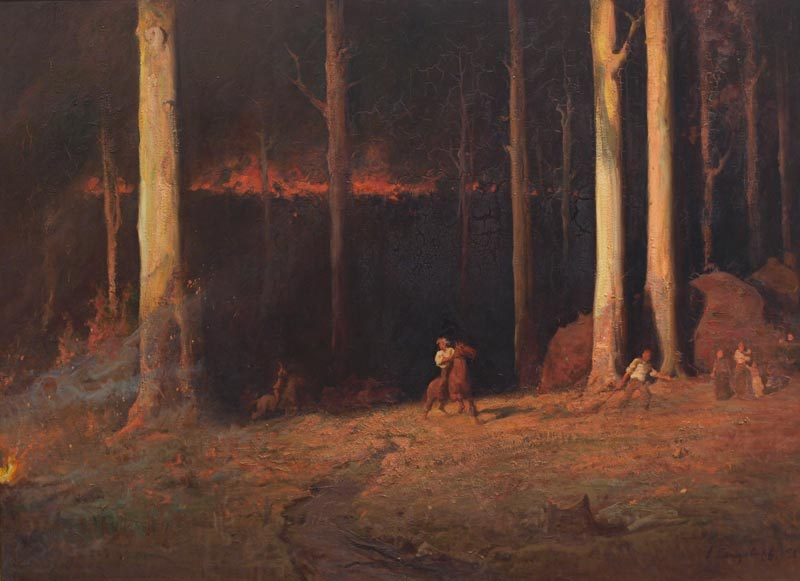
- John Longstaff's Gippsland, Sunday night, 20 February 1898, depicting the "Red Tuesday" bushfires that ravaged Gippsland

- Coordinates: 37°51′S 147°35′E
- Country: Australia
- State: Victoria
- LGA: (by population); Latrobe; Baw Baw; East Gippsland; Wellington; Bass Coast; South Gippsland
- Location: 120 km (75 mi) E of Melbourne

Government
  - State electorate: Bass; Gippsland East; Gippsland South; Morwell; Narracan
  - Federal division: Gippsland; Monash

Area
  - Total: 41,556 km^{2} (16,045 sq mi)

Population
  - Total: 271,266 (2016 census) (Note: Population figure is the combined population of all LGAs in the region)
  - Density: 6.52772/km^{2} (16.90672/sq mi)
- Time zone: UTC+10 (AEST)
  - Summer (DST): UTC+11 (AEDT)
Regions around Gippsland Region
Hume	Hume	New South Wales
Greater Melbourne	Gippsland Region	Tasman Sea
Bass Strait	Bass Strait	Bass Strait

Gippsland (/ˈɡɪpslænd/) is a rural region in the southeastern part of Victoria, Australia, mostly comprising the coastal plains south of the Victorian Alps (the southernmost section of the Great Dividing Range). It covers an elongated area of 41,556 km^{2} (16,045 sq mi) east of the Shire of Cardinia (Melbourne's outermost southeastern suburbs) between Dandenong Ranges and Mornington Peninsula, and is bounded to the north by the mountain ranges and plateaus/highlands of the High Country (which separate it from Hume region in Victoria's northeast), to the southwest by the Western Port Bay, to the south and east by the Bass Strait and the Tasman Sea, and to the east and northeast by the Black–Allan Line (the easternmost section of the Victoria/New South Wales state border).

Gippsland is divided by the Strzelecki Ranges and tributaries of the Gippsland Lakes into West Gippsland, South Gippsland, Latrobe Valley, Central Gippsland and East Gippsland. At the 2016 Australian census, Gippsland had a population of 271,266, with the principal centres Traralgon, Warragul, Drouin, Bairnsdale, Moe, Sale, Morwell, Wonthaggi, Leongatha, and Phillip Island. Gippsland is known for mining, power generation and farming as well as its tourist destinations — Phillip Island, Wilsons Promontory, the Gippsland Lakes, Walhalla, the Baw Baw Plateau, and the Strzelecki Ranges. It also includes around a hundred islands, mostly between the mainland and Tasmania.

== History ==
The traditional owners are Indigenous Australians of the Gunai nation and in part of West Gippsland the Bunurong nation. Before permanent European colonisation, the area was visited by sealers and wattle bark gatherers who did not settle. Samuel Anderson (1803–1863), a Scottish immigrant from Kirkcudbright, agriculturist and explorer, arrived in Hobart, Tasmania, in 1830, and in 1835 established a squatter agricultural settlement on the Bass River in Gippsland, the third permanent colonial settlement in Victoria (then called the Port Phillip District). His business partner Robert Massie joined him in 1837. Both had worked for the Van Diemen's Land Company at Circular Head, Tasmania. Samuel's brothers Hugh (1808–1898) and Thomas (1814–1903) arrived at Bass shortly after, where they established a successful farming venture.

Further European colonisation followed two separate expeditions to the area.

During his expedition to the South (December 1839 – May 1840) in March 1840, Polish explorer Paweł Edmund Strzelecki led an expedition across Gunai country, and gave his own names to many of their natural landmarks and places. Following these expeditions, the name "Gippsland" stuck, a name chosen by Strzelecki in honour of the New South Wales Governor, George Gipps, his sponsor.

Angus McMillan led the second European expedition between 1840, naming Gunai country "Caledonia Australis". The naming of this geographical region, however, remained the name given by P. E. Strzelecki – Gippsland.

The township of Bass was surveyed and colonised in the early 1860s.

The intensive colonisation of south Gippsland began late in the 1870s. A story of that process is told in, The land of the Lyre Bird (1920).

Before the Victorian state government decision to cancel plans for hosting the 2026 Commonwealth Games, Gippsland was set to serve as one of its hosts in regional Victoria.

== Geography ==
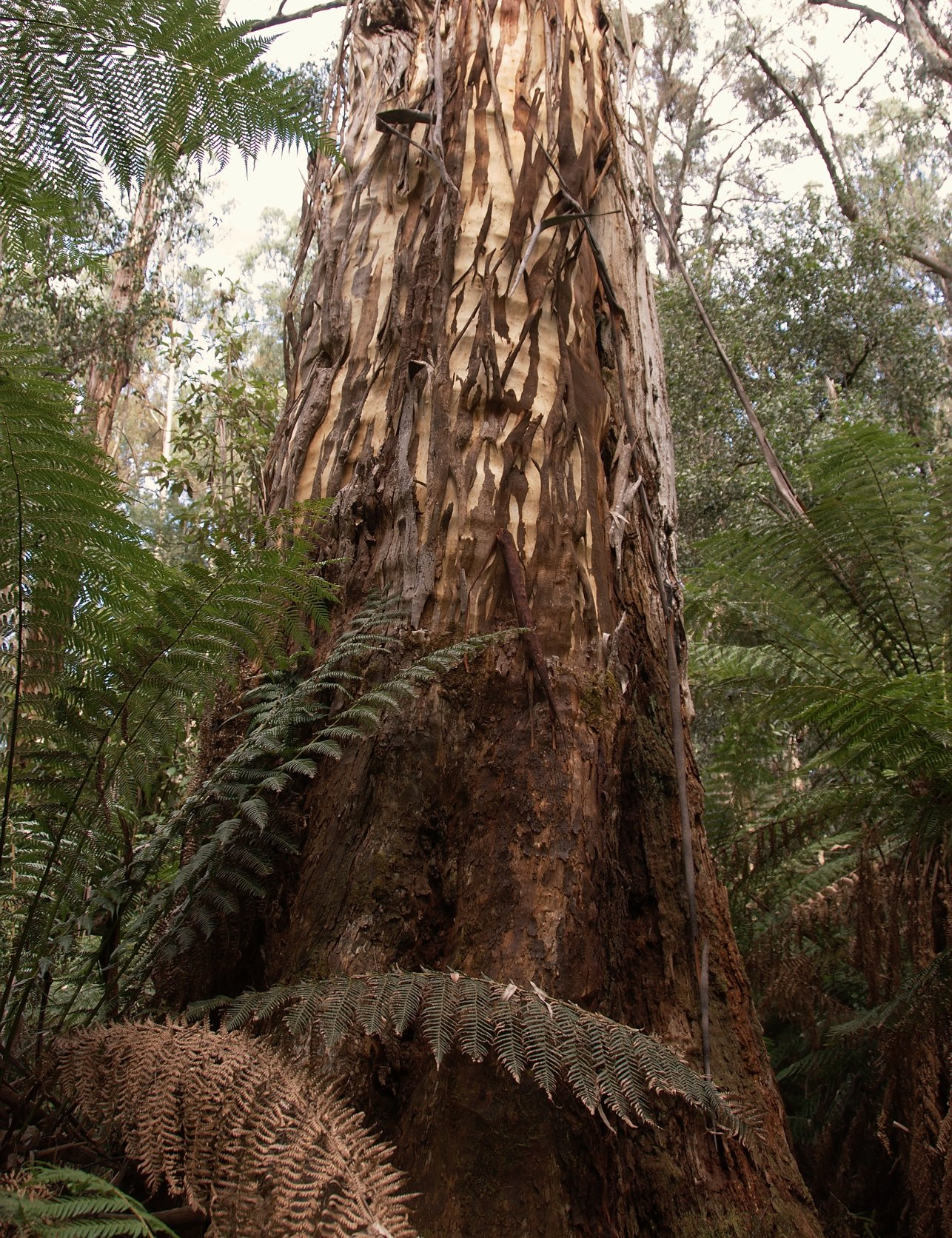
Old growth forests in East Gippsland

Gippsland pastureland with grazing cattle

Gippsland is traditionally subdivided into four or five main sub–regions or districts:

- West Gippsland (roughly equivalent to the Baw Baw Shire)
- South Gippsland (Bass Coast and South Gippsland Shires)
- the Latrobe Valley (Latrobe City and areas of Baw Baw to the north)
- East Gippsland (Shires of Wellington and East Gippsland).
- Sometimes a fifth region, Central Gippsland (corresponding approximately to the Shire of Wellington), is added to refer to the drier zone between the Gippsland Lakes and Yarram.

Gippsland Plains Grassy Woodland is an endangered vegetation community within the region.

== Climate ==
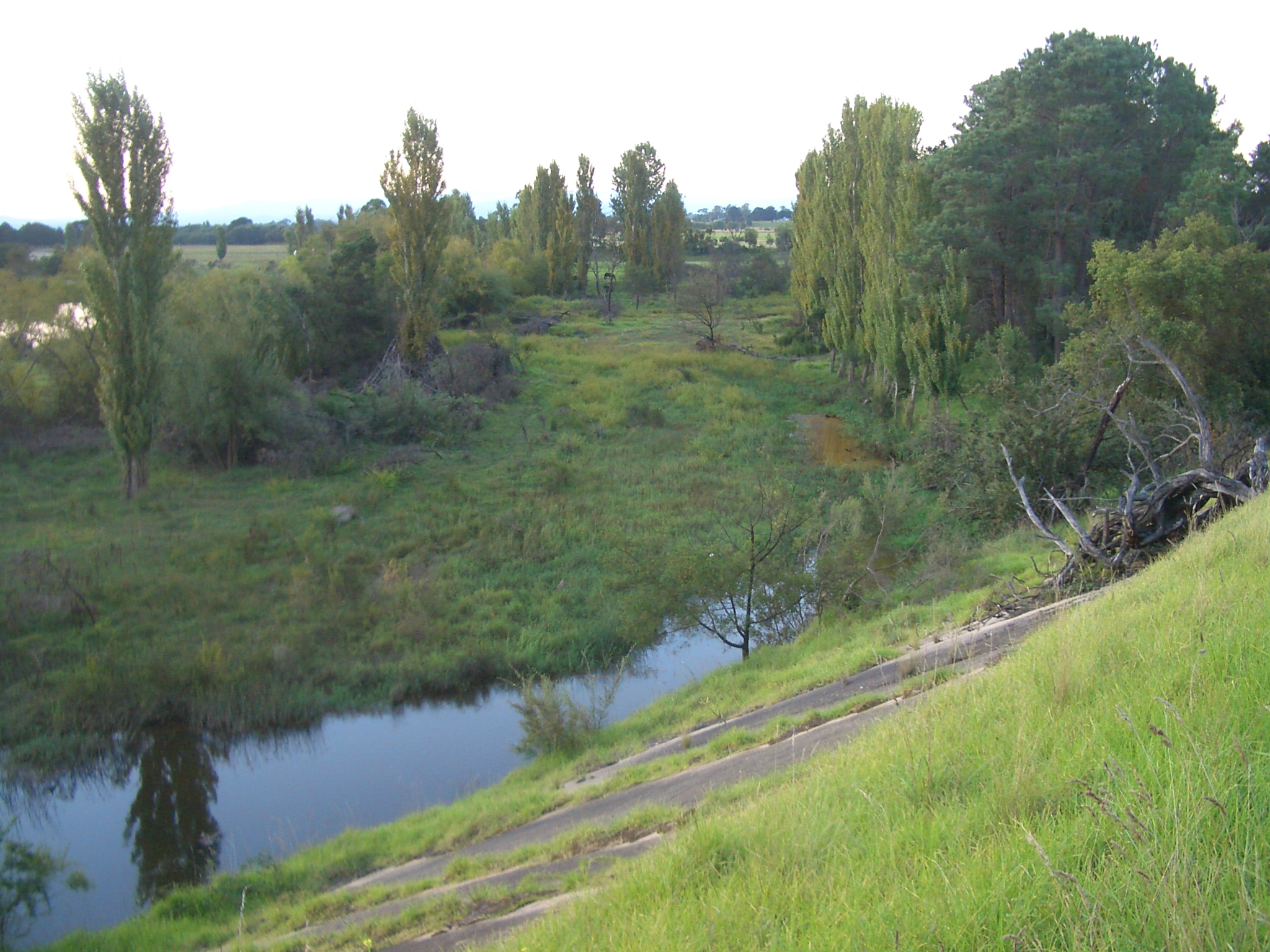
On the Avon River near Stratford

The climate of Gippsland is temperate and generally humid, except in the central region around Sale, where annual rainfall averages around 600 millimetres (24 in). In the Strzelecki Ranges annual rainfall can be as high as 1,500 millimetres (59 in), while on the high mountains of East Gippsland it probably reaches similar levels – much of it falling as snow. In lower levels east of the Snowy River, mean annual rainfall is typically about 900–950 millimetres (35–37 in) and less variable than in the coastal districts of New South Wales. Mean maximum temperatures in lower areas range from 24 °C (75 °F) in January to 15 °C (59 °F) in July. In the highlands of the Baw Baw Plateau and the remote Errinundra Plateau, temperatures range from a maximum of 18 °C (64 °F) to a minimum of 8 °C (46 °F). However, in winter, mean minima in these areas can be as low as −4 °C (25 °F), leading to heavy snowfalls that often isolate the Errinundra Plateau between June and October.

== Flora and fauna ==
Gippsland is home to many species of flora and fauna. Animals that live there include the swamp wallaby, koala, echidna and wombat.

Native plants and trees include grass trees (Xanthorrhoea australis), which provide a valuable food source of nectar, pollen, larvae and seeds for birds, insects and mammals.

== Natural resources ==
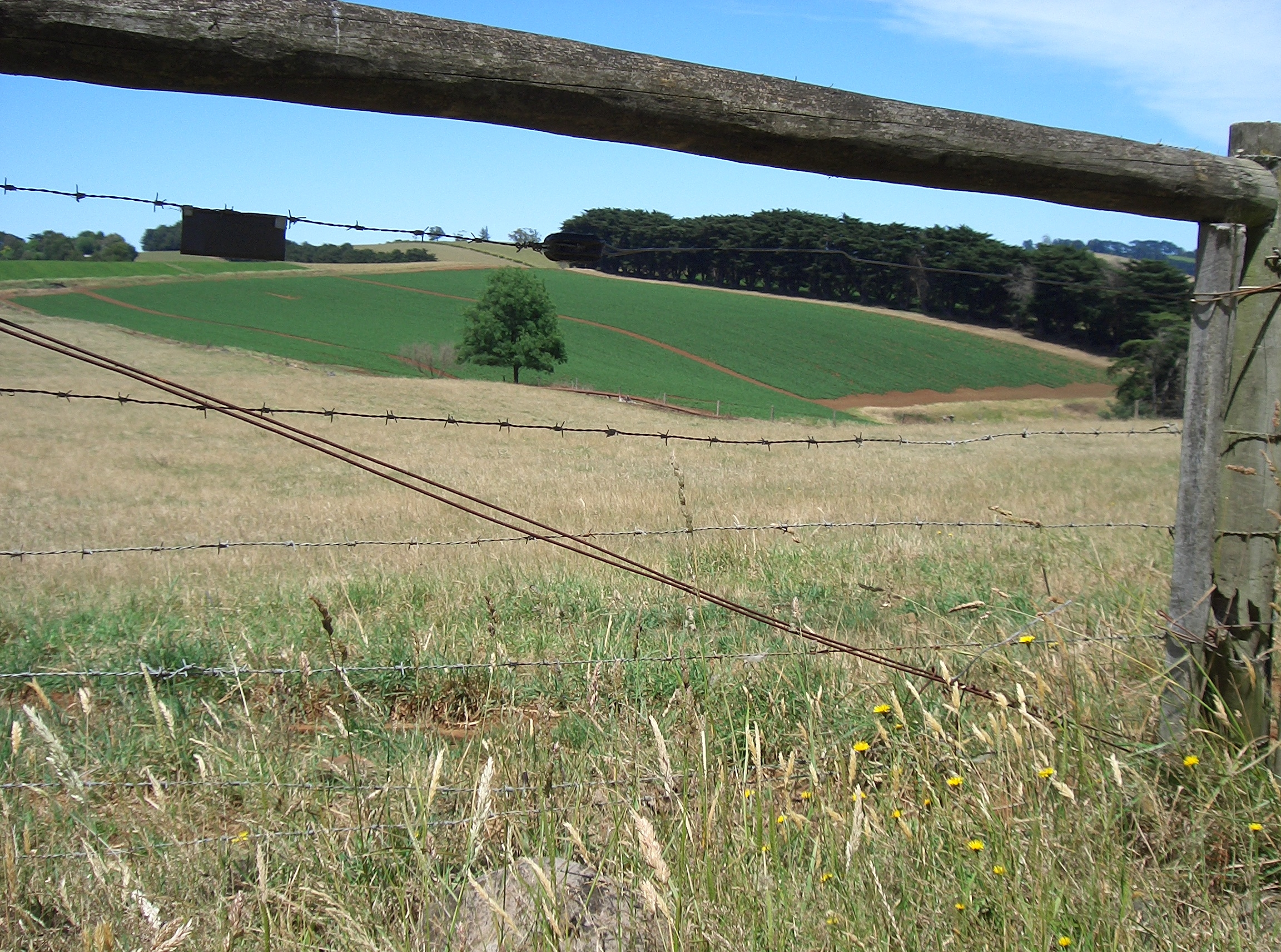
Potato farming in the Thorpdale region

The soils in Gippsland are generally very infertile, being profoundly deficient in nitrogen, phosphorus, potassium and calcium. Apart from frequently flooded areas, they are classed as Spodosols, Psamments and Ultisols. Consequently, heavy fertilisation is required for agriculture or pastoral development. Despite this, parts of Gippsland have become highly productive dairying and vegetable-growing regions: the region supplies Melbourne with most of its needs in these commodities. A few alluvial soils (chiefly near the Snowy) have much better native fertility, and these have always been intensively cultivated. In the extreme northeast is a small section of the Monaro Tableland used for grazing beef cattle.

Gippsland possesses very few deposits of metallic minerals (gold rushes in the nineteenth century around Foster, Buchan petered out quickly). However, the deep underground gold mines operated at Walhalla for a fifty-year period between 1863 and 1913. Gippsland has no deposits of major industrial nonmetallic minerals, but it does feature the world's largest brown coal deposits and, around Sale and offshore in the Bass Strait, some of the largest deposits of oil and natural gas in Australia.

Like the rest of Australia, the seas around Gippsland are of very low productivity as there is no upwelling due to the warm currents in the Tasman Sea. Nonetheless, towns such as Marlo and Mallacoota depended for a long time on the fishing of abalone, whose shells could fetch very high prices because of their use for pearls and pearl inlays.

== Administration ==
=== Political representation ===
For Australian federal elections for the House of Representatives, the electoral divisions of Flinders, Monash, and Gippsland lay entirely or partly in the Gippsland region. Flinders and McMillan are currently held by the Liberal Party, while Gippsland is held by the Nationals.

For elections for the Victorian Legislative Assembly, the electoral districts of Bass, Narracan, Morwell, Gippsland South and Gippsland East lay entirely or partly in the Gippsland region. Bass is held by Labor, Narracan is held by the Liberals, while Gippsland East, Gippsland South and Morwell are held by the Nationals.

==== Local government areas ====
Gippsland contains six local government areas:

Gippsland region LGA populations
Local government area	Area		Population (2011 census)	Source(s)	Population (2016 census)	Source(s)
Local government area	km^{2}	sq mi	Population (2011 census)	Source(s)	Population (2016 census)	Source(s)
Bass Coast Shire	864	334	29,614		32,804	
Shire of Baw Baw	4,031	1,556	42,864		48,479	
Shire of East Gippsland	20,941	8,085	42,196		45,040	
Latrobe City	1,426	551	72,396		73,257	
South Gippsland Shire	3,305	1,276	27,208		28,703	
Shire of Wellington	10,989	4,243	41,440		42,983	
Totals	41,556	16,045	255,718		271,266	

=== Environmental protection ===
The Gippsland region contains the Alfred National Park, Baw Baw National Park, Coopracambra National Park, Croajingolong National Park, Errinundra National Park, Gippsland Lakes Coastal Park, Lind National Park, Mitchell River National Park, Morwell National Park, Snowy River National Park, Tarra-Bulga National Park, The Lakes National Park, and Wilsons Promontory National Park.

There are also large areas of State forest that contribute towards conservation objectives.

== Notable people ==
- Josiah Brooks (born 1989), artist and YouTuber of 'Draw with Jazza'
- Beau Miles (born 1979), outdoor educator and YouTuber
- Warren Pickering (born 1983), politician and leader of One Nation Victoria
- Lionel Rose (born 1948), professional boxer from Warragul
- Dale Thomas (born 1987), former AFL player for Collingwood and Carlton from Drouin

== See also ==
- Geography of Victoria
- Regions of Victoria
- Giant Gippsland earthworm
- Gippsland massacres
- White woman of Gippsland
- Old Gippstown
- Gippsland Art Gallery
