= Tarragal Caves =

Cave network and archaeological site in Victoria

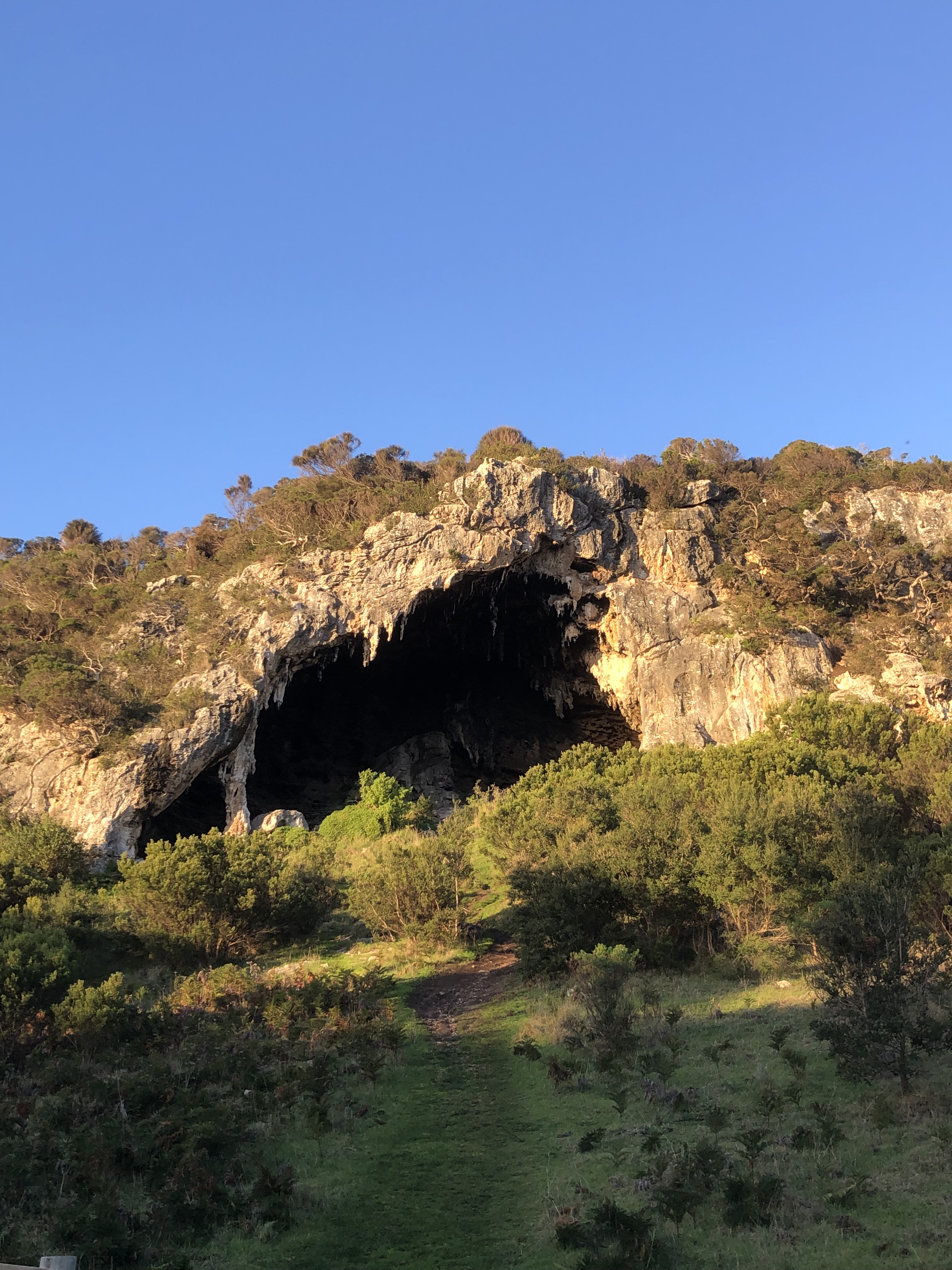
- Tarragal Caves

- Location of the caves in Victoria
- Interactive map of Tarragal Caves
- 38°19′7.1″S 141°24′28″E
- Location: Cape Bridgewater, Victoria
- Region: Australia

Site notes
- Excavation dates: 1970s
- Archaeologists: Harry Lourandos

The Tarragal Caves are a network of large limestone caves and rockshelters which overlook the Bridgewater Lakes near the towns of Tarragal and Cape Bridgewater, Victoria in the Charles La Trobe and are near Discovery Bay Coastal Park. The caves were identified as important Aboriginal camping places early in the historic period, and were excavated in the late 1970s by Harry Lourandos, revealing stratified deposits in the floor of 11,300 years old, along with shell midden deposits and earth ovens over 11,000 years old.

Located just off the Bridgewater Lakes Road, and accessible in part by walking track, the cave openings form a series of galleries with clear views across the surrounding landscape and lakes.

One of the caves extends under ground for over 400 m (1,300 ft) and has a sinkhole opening to the surface so that there is a constant stream of air through the cave and rising up the hole. It is said that whenever Aboriginals approached this, they would a piece of wood into the hole to "propitiate the demon supposed to reside within its profound and mysterious depths."

Colonial administrator Charles La Trobe visited the site in 1845 and 1846, and had some of his men lower a rope ladder over the cliff so he could explore the caves. He also provided a detailed description in 1846, noting that "...the ‘natives’ referred to it as ‘Lubras’ Cave’" and that they "...knew the caverns well and ...had a superstitious dread of them, stating that the caverns below were inhabited by headless lubras". LaTrobe noted that when they came to the point under the sink hole there was a large pile of timber, assumed to be the items thrown down by Aboriginals over the ages. They then set fire to the pile lighting up the cave "... and displayed a magnificent vaulted chamber, bedecked with long glistening stalactites, and tenanted by vast numbers of bats, whose whirring, whizzing noise was probably that which the natives attributed to some supernatural being."

An early etching depicting an Aboriginal family in the cave entrance was probably inspired by La Trobe's record.

Pollen analysis of sediments in the cave has assisted in reconstructing the Pleistocene climate and environment of the region and understanding what resources were available to Aborigines.

== See also ==
- New Guinea II cave
- Buchan Caves
- Cloggs Cave
- Byaduk Caves
