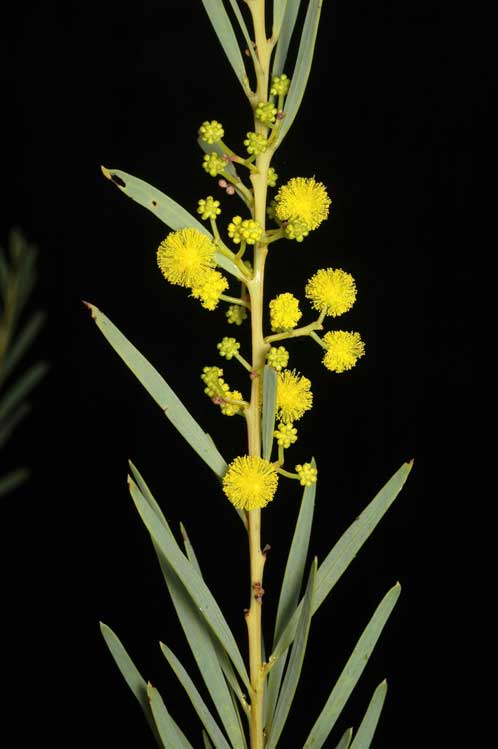

Scientific classification
- Kingdom: Plantae
- Clade: Embryophytes
- Clade: Tracheophytes
- Clade: Spermatophytes
- Clade: Angiosperms
- Clade: Eudicots
- Clade: Rosids
- Order: Fabales
- Family: Fabaceae
- Subfamily: Caesalpinioideae
- Clade: Mimosoid clade
- Genus: Acacia
- Subgenus: Acacia subg. Phyllodineae
- Species: A. kybeanensis

Binomial name
- Acacia kybeanensis Maiden & Blakely
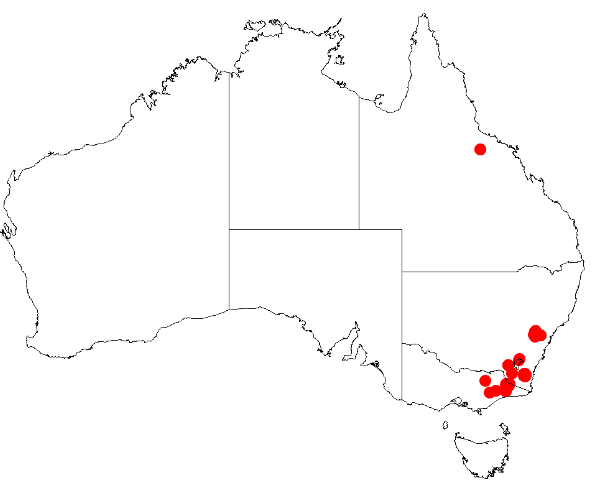
- Occurrence data from AVH

Synonyms
- Acacia buxifolia var. subvelutina F.Muell.; Acacia oreades Maiden & Blakely; Racosperma kybeanense (Maiden & Blakely) Pedley

= Acacia kybeanensis =

Species of legume

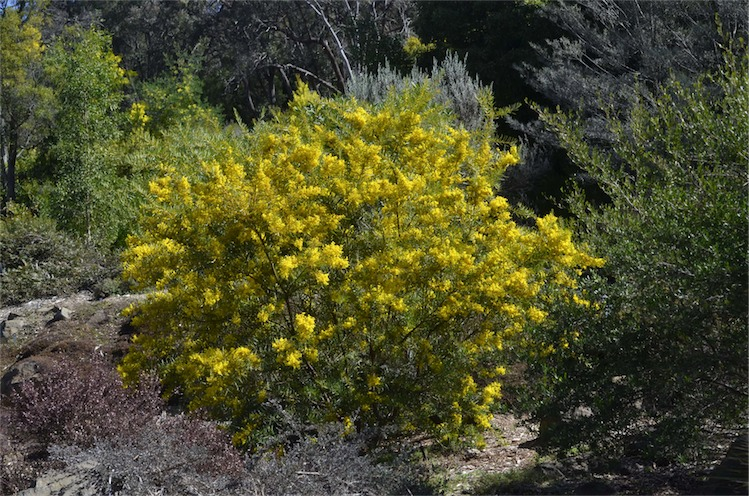
Habit in the Australian National Botanic Gardens

Acacia kybeanensis, commonly known as kybean wattle or kybeyan wattle, is a species of flowering plant in the family Fabaceae and is endemic to the south-east of continental Australia. It is a dense shrub with hairy branchlets, oblong to narrowly elliptic or lance-shaped phyllodes, spherical heads of bright golden yellow flowers oblong to narrowly oblong, firmly paperypods raised over the seeds.

== Description ==
Acacia kybeanensis is a dense shrub that typically grows to a height of 1–2.5 m (3–8 ft) and has hairy branchlets. The phyllodes are sometimes slightly asymmetric, oblong-elliptic to narrowly elliptic or lance-shaped, 10–50 mm (0.39–1.97 in) long, 3–6 mm (0.12–0.24 in) wide, grey-green to glaucous with a single vein on each side and a gland 1–15 mm (0.039–0.591 in) above the pulvinus. The flowers are borne in four to ten spherical heads on racemes 10–40 mm (0.39–1.57 in) long on peduncles 2–3 mm (0.079–0.118 in) long, each head with 8 to 15 bright golden yellow flowers. Flowering occurs between August and October and the pods are oblong to narrowly oblong, up to 60 mm (2.4 in) long, 10–20 mm (0.39–0.79 in) wide, firmly leathery, glabrous, blackish and raised over the seeds along the midline. The seeds are elliptic to broadly elliptic, about 4 mm (0.16 in) long and 3.5 mm (0.14 in) wide with an aril on the end.

== Taxonomy ==
Acacia kybeanensis was first formally described in 1927 by Joseph Maiden and William Blakley in the Journal and Proceedings of the Royal Society of New South Wales from specimens collected in 1908 near the head of the Tuross River at Kybean by Richard Hind Cambage.

== Distribution and habitat ==
Kybean wattle grows in forest and woodland on rocky slopes, often at about 1,000 m (3,300 ft) altitude, in the Newnes area and south from the Snowy Mountains area in New South Wales to the Suggan Buggan–Gelantipy area in north eastern Gippsland, Victoria.

== Conservation status ==
Acacia kybeanensis is listed as 'vulnerable' under the Victorian Government Flora and Fauna Guarantee Act 1988.

== See also ==
- List of Acacia species
