= Hibbertia spathulata =

Scientific classification
- Kingdom: Plantae
- Clade: Tracheophytes
- Clade: Angiosperms
- Clade: Eudicots
- Order: Dilleniales
- Family: Dilleniaceae
- Genus: Hibbertia
- Species: H. spathulata

Binomial name
- Hibbertia spathulata Toelken

Species of flowering plant

Hibbertia spathulata is a species of flowering plant in the family Dilleniaceae and is endemic to south-eastern Australia. It is a shrub with erect to spreading branches, narrowly triangular to spatula-shaped leaves and yellow flowers arranged near the ends of branches, with five to twelve stamens and a smaller number of staminodes arranged in two or three groups around the two hairy carpels.

== Description ==
Hibbertia spathulata is a shrub that typically grows to a height of up to 0.5–1.5 m (1 ft 8 in – 4 ft 11 in) and has erect to spreading branches. The leaves are triangular to spatula-shaped, mostly 4–22 mm (0.16–0.87 in) long and 1.5–4 mm (0.059–0.157 in) wide on a petiole up to 0.5 mm (0.020 in) long. The flowers are arranged singly near the ends of branches on a peduncle 0.6–4.4 mm (0.024–0.173 in) long, with linear to lance-shaped bracts 5.0–5.4 mm (0.20–0.21 in) long and 0–1.3 mm (0.000–0.051 in) wide near the base. The five sepals are joined at the base, the outer lobes 5.2–5.9 mm (0.20–0.23 in) long and 2.7–3.0 mm (0.11–0.12 in) wide, the inner lobes slightly shorter but broader. The five petals are yellow, oblong to lance-shaped with the narrower end towards the base, 5.8–7.8 mm (0.23–0.31 in) long with five to twelve stamens and a smaller number of staminodes arranged in five bundles around the two hairy carpels, each usually with two ovules. Flowering occurs from September to December.

== Taxonomy ==
Hibbertia spathulata was first formally described in 1957 by Norman Arthur Wakefield in The Victorian Naturalist from specimens he collected near the Snowy River in 1955. The specific epithet (spathulata) means "spoon-shaped" and the eopithet pleiclada means "more-branched".

In 2012, Hellmut R. Toelken described two subspecies and the names are recognised by the Australian Plant Census:

- Hibbertia spathulata subsp. pleioclada Toelken has leaves with star-shaped hairs with mostly five or six arms;
- Hibbertia spathulata N.A.Wakef. subsp. spathulata has leaves with star-shaped hairs with mostly eight to ten arms.

== Distribution and habitat ==
Subspecies spathulata has been observed on rocky slopes in heath, woodland and forest in the catchment of the Snowy River, between Suggan Buggan and Gelantipy in Victoria and has been only rarely recorded. Subspecies pleioclada has only been collected once in the Forest Lands State Forest, near Tenterfield in New South Wales.

== See also ==
- List of Hibbertia species
