= Pomaderris buchanensis =

Scientific classification
- Kingdom: Plantae
- Clade: Tracheophytes
- Clade: Angiosperms
- Clade: Eudicots
- Clade: Rosids
- Order: Rosales
- Family: Rhamnaceae
- Genus: Pomaderris
- Species: P. buchanensis

Binomial name
- Pomaderris buchanensis N.G.Walsh

Species of shrub

Pomaderris buchanensis is a species of flowering plant in the family Rhamnaceae and is endemic to Victoria, Australia. It is a shrub with densely hairy young stems, narrowly egg-shaped or lance-shaped leaves, and panicles of pale greenish or yellowish flowers.

== Description ==
Pomaderris buchanensis is a shrub that typically grows to a height of up to 4 m (13 ft), its young stems covered with star-shaped, rust-coloured hairs. The leaves are egg-shaped to lance-shaped, mostly 50–80 mm (2.0–3.1 in) long and 10–23 mm (0.39–0.91 in) wide, with stipules 2.0–3.5 mm (0.079–0.138 in) long at the base but that soon fall off. The lower surface of the leaves is densely covered with star-shaped hairs. The flowers are borne in thin, loose panicles up to 100 mm (3.9 in) long, each flower on a pedicel 1.5–3 mm (0.059–0.118 in) long. The floral cup and sepals are pale greenish or yellowish, the sepals 1.2–1.5 mm (0.047–0.059 in) long but there are no petals. Flowering occurs in November and December.

== Taxonomy ==
Pomaderris buchanensis was first formally described in 2008 by Neville Grant Walsh in the journal Muelleria from specimens he collected near the junction of the Buchan and Snowy Rivers in 2003. The specific epithet (buchanensis) refers to the type location near the township of Buchan in eastern Victoria.

== Distribution and habitat ==
This pomaderris grows in shrubland on the rocky banks of the Snowy River in the Snowy River National Park.
