= Byaduk Caves =

Caves in Victoria, Australia

- The interior of Harmans Cave 1, part of the Byaduk Caves
- Interactive map of Byaduk Caves
- Location: Byaduk, Victoria
- Coordinates: 37.907945°S 141.976920°E
- Geology: Lava tube
- Access: Yes (Harmans Cave 1)

The Byaduk Caves are a system of lava caves located within Mount Napier State Park, near Byaduk in western Victoria, Australia. Formed within the Harmans Valley lava flow from nearby Mount Napier, the caves are recognised as the most extensive lava cave system in Australia and among the best-preserved examples of lava tube development in the country. The cave network is accessible via a series of walking trails and viewing platforms, and is noted for its geological significance, native vegetation and bat populations.

== Geology ==
The Byaduk Caves were formed when basaltic lava from the eruption of Mount Napier flowed westwards through Harmans Valley. As the surface of the lava flow cooled and solidified, molten lava continued to drain beneath the hardened crust, creating an extensive network of lava tubes. When sections of the roof later collapsed, they exposed the caves, sinkholes and natural arches visible today.

The caves occur along the central axis of the Harmans Valley lava flow, which extends for approximately 24 kilometres from Mount Napier. Individual eruptions are thought to have occurred over several weeks, separated by quieter periods, before the lava eventually joined the Mount Eccles lava flow near Tyrendarra. Together, these lava flows form one of the longest volcanic flow systems in the Southern Hemisphere.

The cave system contains a variety of lava tube features, including collapse dolines, natural tunnels, lava cascades and multi-level passages. The largest tunnels measure up to 18 metres wide, 10 metres high and extend approximately 20 metres below the surface, while many smaller caves preserve original laval floors, arched ceilings, lava benches, stalactites and other volcanic structures formed as the molten rock cooled and drained away.

Geological investigations have identified multiple phases of volcanic activity within the cave system. Exposures created by quarrying reveal older bedded scoria deposits overlain by younger layers of coarse volcanic spatter and tuffaceous material, reflecting changes in eruptive style during the formation of Mount Napier.

== Cave system ==
The Byaduk Caves comprise numerous individual caves connected by sections of the original lava tube system, although it is not possible to travel continuously through the entire network. The caves include Harmans No. 1 Cave, Harmans No. 2 Cave, Bridge Cave, Church Cave, Tunnel Cave, The Turk, Fern Cave, The Bathtub, The Staircase, Shephard's Cave, The Basin Cave, Flower Pot and Browns Cave.

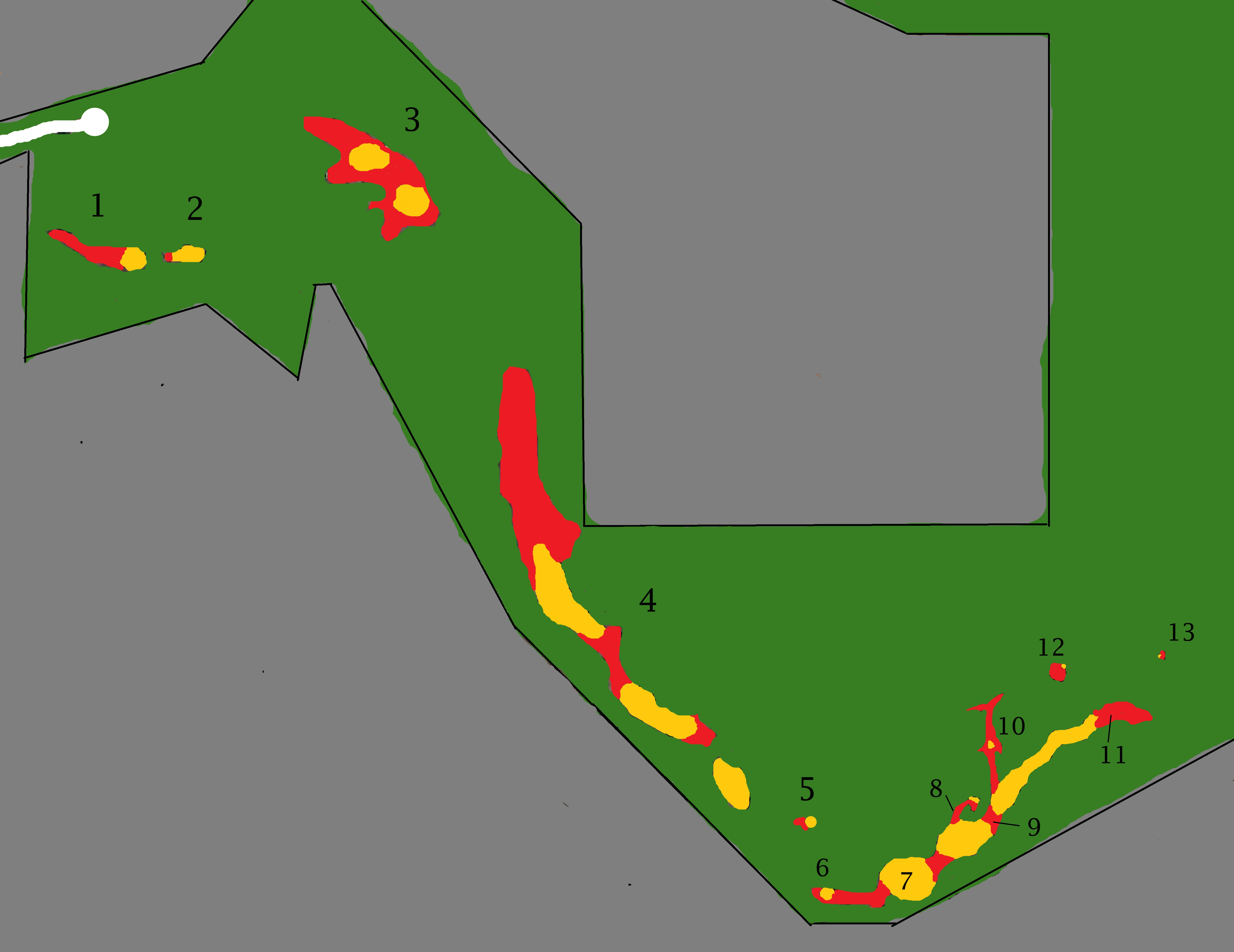
A map of the Byaduk Caves: The Mount Napier State Park, exposed sections, underground sections. 1: Harman's No. 1 Cave, 2: Harman's No. 2 Cave, 3: Bridge Cave, 4: Church Cave, 5: The Basin, 6: The Flower Pot, 7: The Bathtub, 8: Shephard's Cave, 9: Tunnel Cave, 10: Fern Cave, 11: The Turk, 12: The Staircase, 13: Browns Cave

Church Cave is the largest and most complex cave in the system. It preserves evidence of successive lava drainage events, with large collapsed slabs of former lava crust overlying smaller chambers formed beneath the original cave floor.

Harmans No. 1 Cave is one of the most accessible caves and consists of a relatively straight lava tube with a flat lava floor and arched roof. Bench-like lava terraces record former lava levels, while the entrance is formed by a large circular collapse doline.

Other caves preserve a wide variety of volcanic features. Shepard's Cave contains well-preserved ropy lava floors, lava stalactites and small lava stalagmites, while The Staircase is noted for its stepped lava benches, colourful lava formations and extensive wall decorations created as lava levels gradually fell within the chamber. Tunnel Cave and Bridge Cave provide some of the clearest exposures of the original lava tubes that once carried molten lava beneath the surface of the flow.

== Flora and fauna ==
The collapse sinkholes create sheltered, moist environments that support vegetation not commonly found on the surrounding lava plain. More than 20 species of ferns have been recorded within the cave entrances and sinkholes, including kangaroo fern, common maidenhair, batswing fern, soft water-fern and spleenworts. Many sinkholes were once dominated by soft tree ferns, although most were removed by collectors during the twentieth century. Visitors are encouraged to remain on designated tracks, as trampling can damage the fragile vegetation and inhibit regeneration.

The caves provide important habitat for colonies of southern bent-wing bats, with individuals known to move between Byaduk, Warrnambool and the Naracoorte cave systems in South Australia. Numerous animal remains have also been recovered from the caves, including bons of thylacines, wombats and brush-tailed rock-wallabies, many of which are believed to have accumulated through predation or natural deposition over thousands of years. Tiger snakes, eastern grey kangaroos and feral goats are also commonly observed in the surrounding reserve.

== Access and tourism ==
The Byaduk Caves are accessed via a signposted walking circuit of approximately 1.5 kilometres that passes several major sinkholes and cave entrances. Viewing platforms and interpretive signs provide information about the volcanic landscape, while visitors can safely enter Harmans No. 1 Cave without specialised equipment. Access to most other caves requires ropes, scrambling over unstable basalt blocks and caving experience, and is generally recommended only for experienced cavers.

== Gallery ==
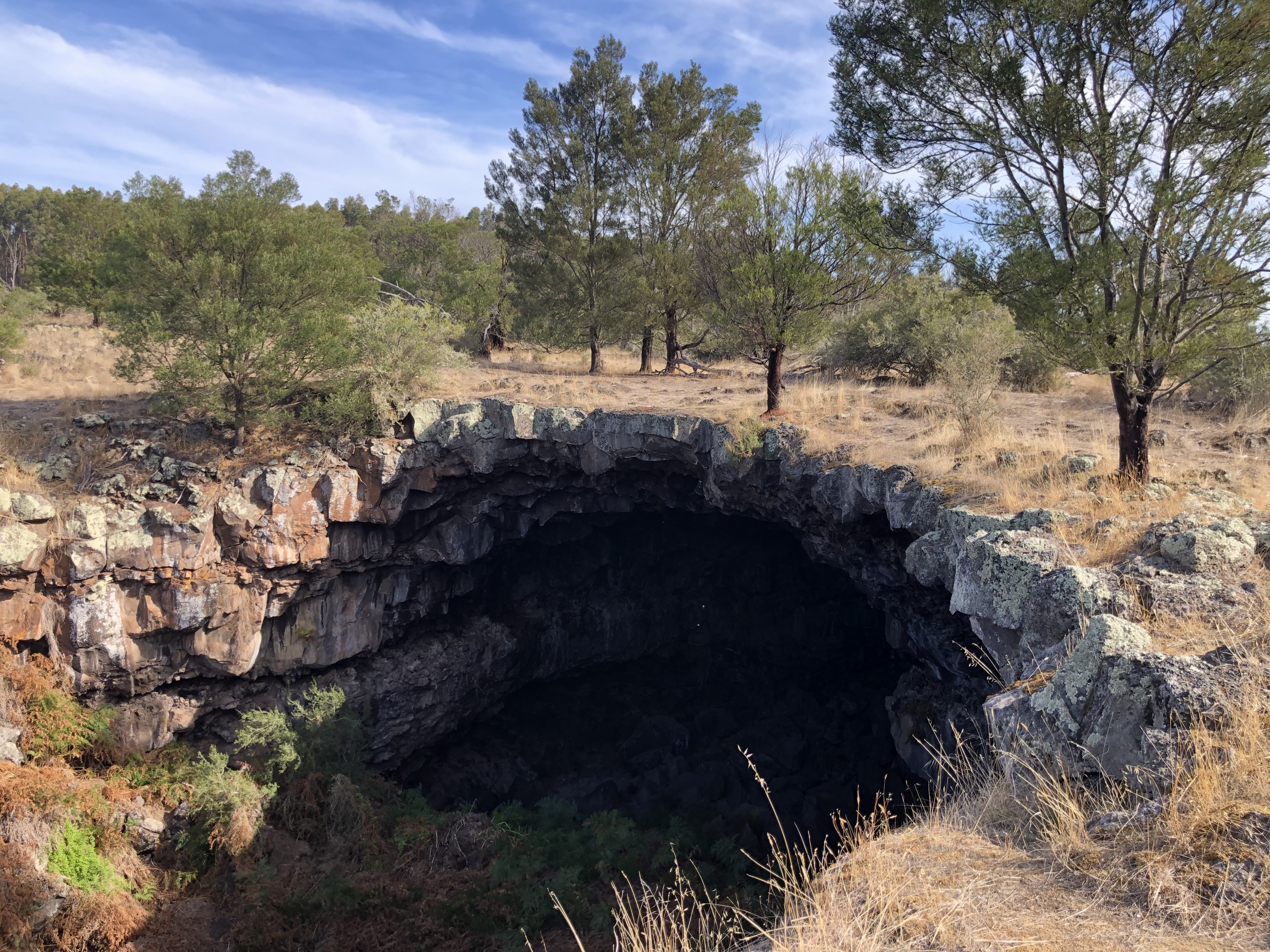
Section of Bridge Cave

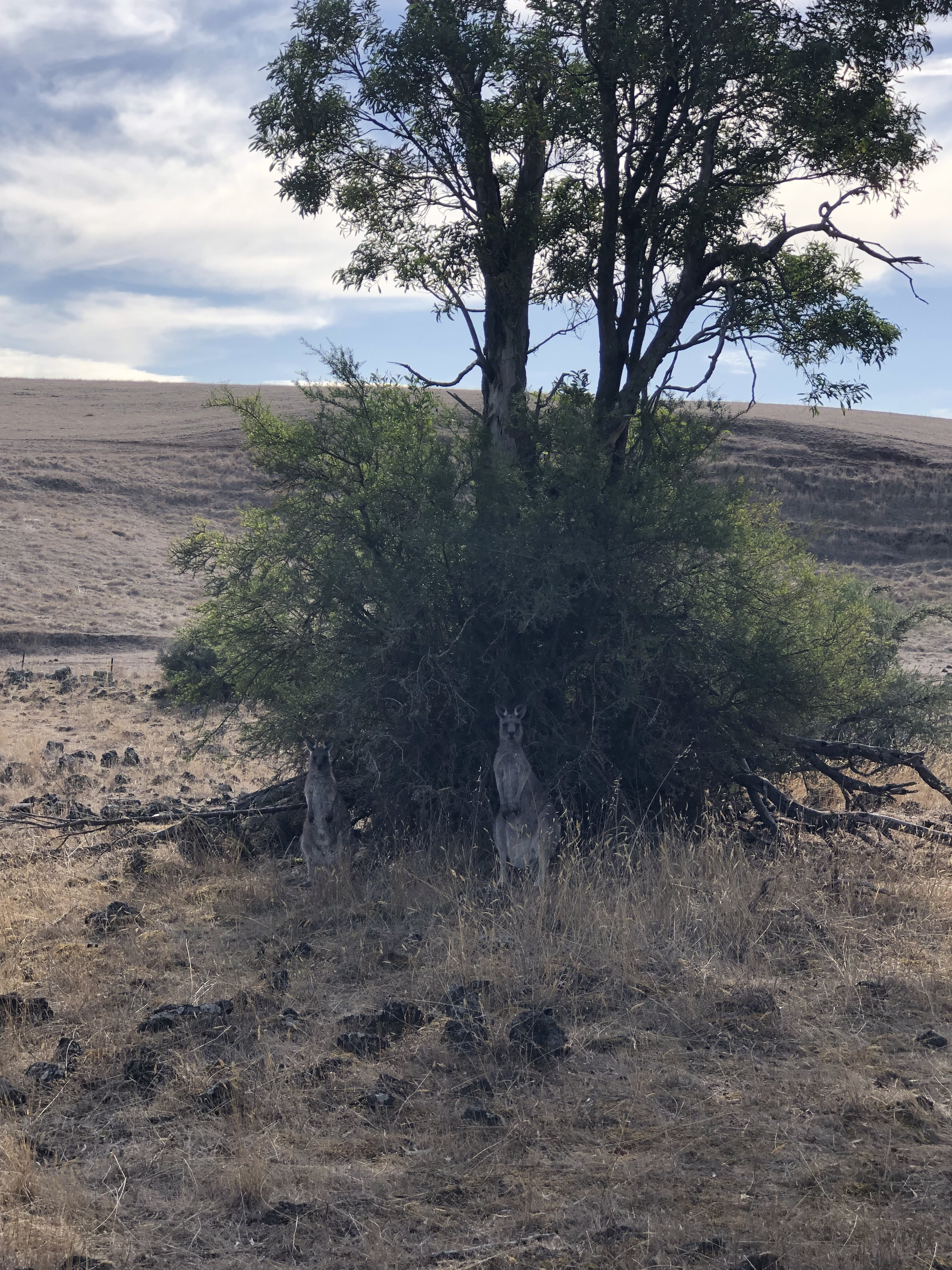
Curious kangaroos

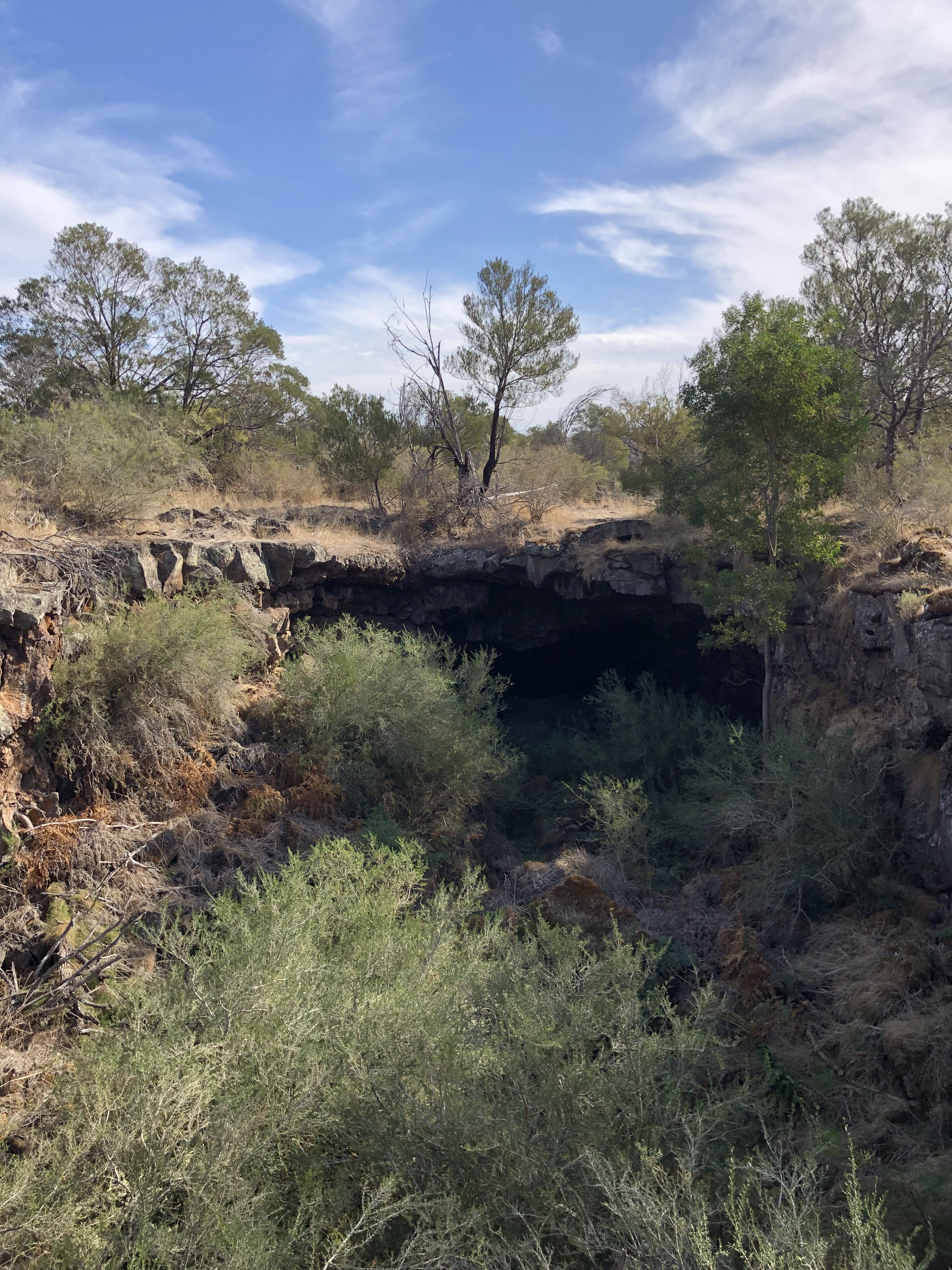
Harman's No. 1 Cave

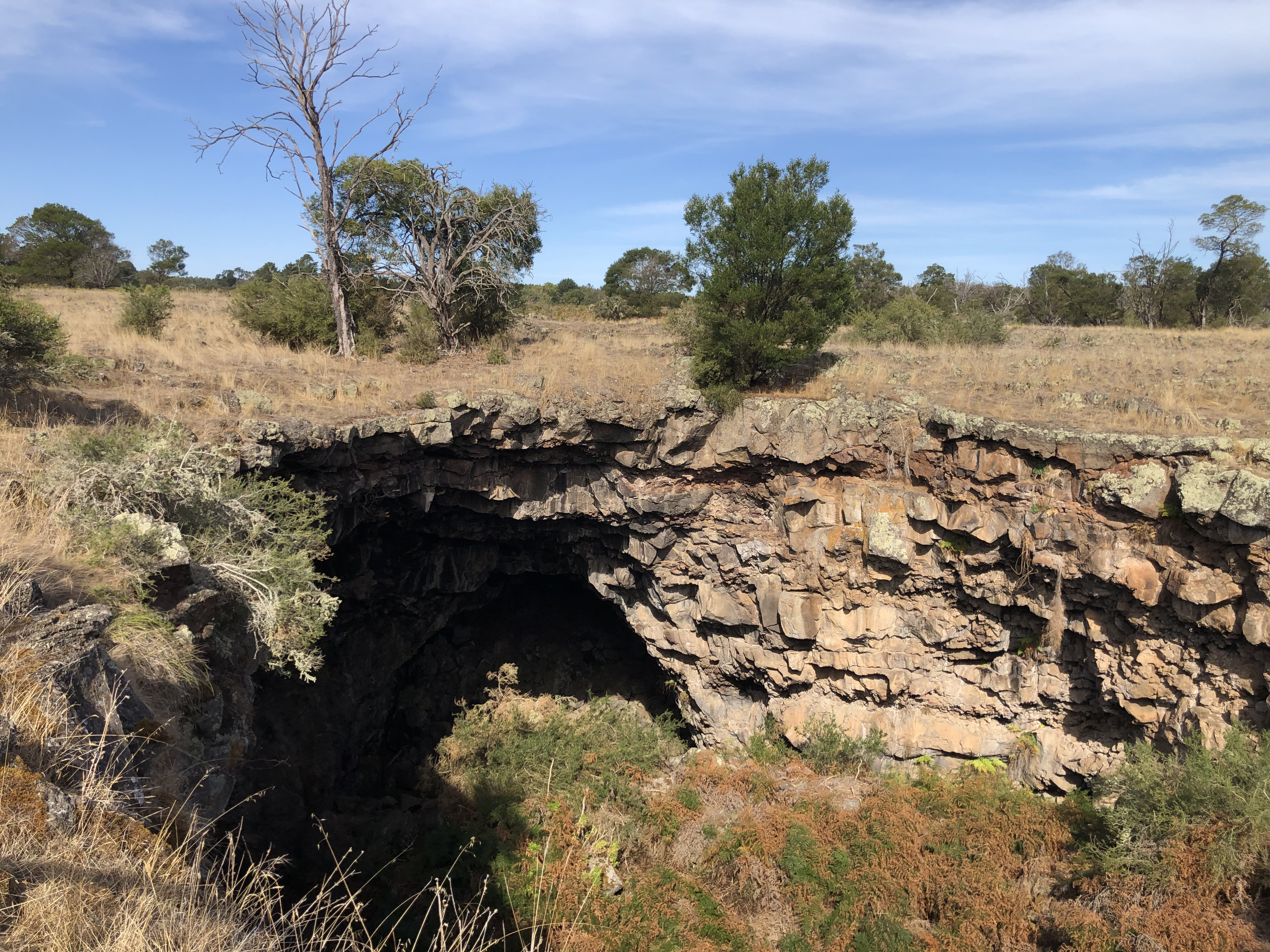
Section of Bridge Cave

== See also ==
- Buchan Caves
- Naracoorte Caves
- Princess Margaret Rose Cave
- Tarragal Caves
