= Berrima River =

Berrima Suggan Buggan, Toonginbooka, Oonginbooka
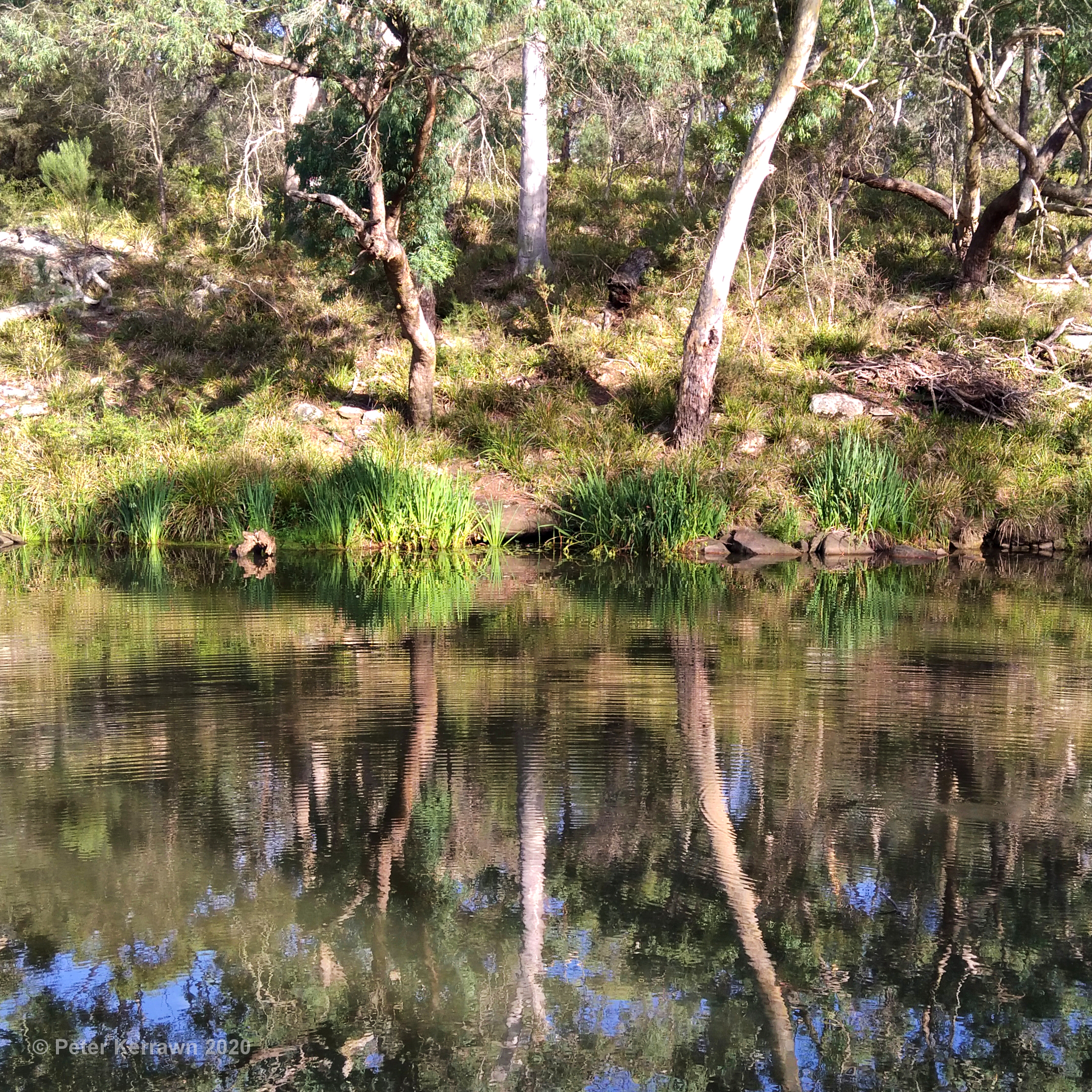
- Scene along the riverbank walk at Berrima

- Location of the Berrima River mouth, south of the Black-Allan Line, in Victoria
- Etymology: Aboriginal: meaning "to the south"

Location
- Country: Australia
- State: New South Wales, Victoria
- Region: Australian Alps (IBRA), Snowy Mountains, Victorian Alps
- Local government areas: Snowy Monaro Regional Council, Shire of East Gippsland

Physical characteristics
- Source: Berrima Range, Great Dividing Range
  - location: Snowy Mountains, New South Wales
  - coordinates: 36°48′4″S 148°14′42″E
  - elevation: 1,030 m (3,380 ft)
- Mouth: confluence with Freestone Creek to form the Suggan Buggan River
  - location: Alpine National Park, Victoria
  - coordinates: 36°51′54″S 148°14′7″E
  - elevation: 695 m (2,280 ft)
- Length: 8 km (5.0 mi)

Basin features
- River system: Snowy River catchment
- National park: Alpine NP

The Berrima River (in Victoria), also called the Berrima Creek (in New South Wales), is a perennial river of the Snowy River catchment, in the Alpine region of the Australian states of New South Wales and Victoria.

== Course and features ==
The Berrima River rises below the Berrima Range in a remote alpine wilderness area just north of the Black-Allan Line that forms part of the border between New South Wales and Victoria. The river flows generally south, before reaching its confluence with the Freestone Creek to form the Suggan Buggan River in the Shire of East Gippsland, within the Alpine National Park in Victoria. The river descends 336 metres (1,102 ft) over its 8-kilometre (5.0 mi) course.

== Etymology ==
The word berrima is derived from the Aboriginal word meaning "to the south".

== History ==
=== Aboriginal history ===
The traditional custodians of the land surrounding the Berrima River are the Australian Aboriginal Bidawal and Nindi-Ngudjam Ngarigu Monero peoples.

== See also ==
- List of rivers of Australia
