= Josephine Flood =

Australian archaeologist

Josephine Flood AM
- Born: Josephine Mary Scarr; 25 July 1936 (age 90); Yorkshire, England
- Citizenship: Australian
- Education: Cambridge University; Australian National University
- Awards: Centenary Medal (2001); Member of the Order of Australia (2019)
- Scientific career
- Fields: Archaeology
- Workplaces: Australian National University, Australian Heritage Commission

Josephine Mary Flood, AM, FAHA (née Scarr, born 25 July 1936) is an English-born Australian archaeologist, mountaineer, and author.

== Early life and education ==
Josephine Flood was born Josephine Scarr in Yorkshire, England. She took a BA in Classics at Girton College, Cambridge, in 1959, later receiving an MA (1968) and a PhD (1973) from the Australian National University. Her PhD thesis was published as: The Moth Hunters: Aboriginal prehistory of the Australian Alps in 1980.

In 1963, Flood moved to Australia. She married Australian diplomat Philip Flood the following year, subsequently having three children.

== Professional career ==
In 1963, at ANU, Flood was appointed as a lecturer in Classical Archaeology, but in 1964, she transferred into the field of Australian archaeology and commenced a master's degree. In 1978, Flood was appointed Senior Conservation Officer with the Australian Heritage Commission in Canberra, becoming assistant director from 1979 to 1991, where in 1984 she headed the Aboriginal Environment Section. Over 2000 Aboriginal archaeological sites were added to the Register of the National Estate during her time at the AHC. She also contributed to the World Heritage Listing of Kakadu National Park, the Tasmanian South West Wilderness Area, and the Willandra Lakes Region of NSW.

Flood indicates that she discovered Cloggs Cave near Buchan, Victoria, while driving to another site in eastern Victoria. Her subsequent excavations revealed extensive evidence of Aboriginal stone and bone tools, with the basal layer now dated to more than 30,000 years.

Flood has followed a theoretical approach involving the use of recent ethnographic information to reinterpret the evidence of prehistoric archaeological material on the basis that "there have only been minor changes in the "stone-age, foraging, semi-nomadic way of life" of Aboriginal people throughout history".

In 1989, Flood was able to use the discovery of a cremated female skeleton to explain what life might have been like at Lake Mungo. Flood used this information to deduce the role of women in this Aboriginal society.

== Awards and prizes ==
In 1991, Flood was elected a Fellow of the Australian Academy of the Humanities (FAHA). Flood received the Centenary Medal in 2001 For service to Australian society and the humanities in prehistory and archaeology. Her most recent book, The Original Australians was a finalist in the Prime Minister's Prize for Australian History in 2007.

Flood was made a Member of the Order of Australia (AM) in the 2019 Queen's Birthday Honours in recognition of her "significant service to archaeology, and to the study of Indigenous culture".

== Other interests and retirement ==
Flood is also a mountaineer. She was possibly the only female member of the roof climbing group at Cambridge University, who practised and honed their rock and mountain climbing skills by scaling the university's stone buildings. In 1961, she led the Women's Kulu Expedition and the following year she joined the Women's Jagdula Expedition to Lha Shamma in the Dolpo area of Nepal with Dorothea Gravina and Denise Evans (the wife of the Everest mountaineer Charles Evans). On these two expeditions, she climbed six previously unclimbed peaks of over 20,000 feet and wrote a book telling the story of the ascents and overland drive to India entitled 'Four Miles High'.

She retired early to devote time to research, writing, and travel. Between 1981 and 1992, she led seven expeditions (funded by Earthwatch) to excavate sites and record rock art in Cape York and the Victoria River region of the Northern Territory. In retirement, she has also provided support and field data for archaeological projects in the Australian Alps, rock art in the Northern Territory at sites of the 'Land of the Lightning Brothers', and dating of the extinction of Australian megafauna. In 2015, Flood was elected a Member of the Emeritus Faculty of ANU.

== Publications ==
- Four Miles High (1966) (published under her maiden name, Josephine Scarr)
- Moth Hunters of the Australian Capital Territory (1966, 2nd edition 2010)
- The Moth Hunters: Aboriginal Prehistory of the Australian Alps (1980)
- Archaeology of the Dreamtime: The Story of Prehistoric Australia and its People (1983, 7th edition 2010)
- Riches of Ancient Australia: A Journey into Prehistory University of Queensland Press Paperbacks (1990, 3rd edition 1999)
- Rock Art of the Dreamtime: Images of Ancient Australia (1997)
- The Original Australians: story of the Aboriginal People (2006)
- The Original Australians: story of the Aboriginal People - 2nd Edition (2019)
