= Suggan Buggan River =

River in Victoria, Australia

Suggan Buggan Toonginbooka, Oonginbooka, Berrima Creek
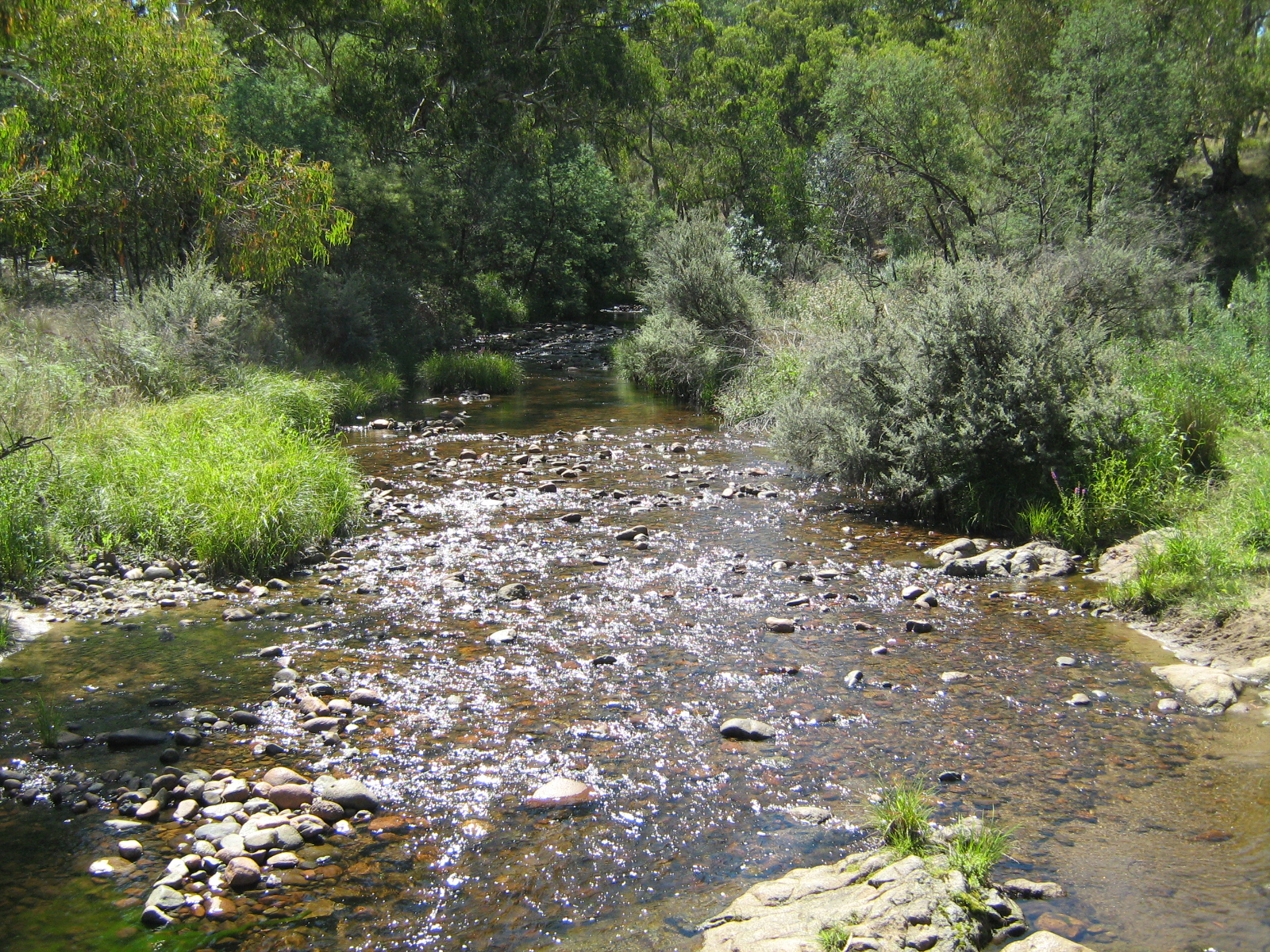
- The Suggan Buggan River at Suggan Buggan

- Mouth of the Suggan Buggan River in Victoria
- Etymology: Aboriginal: bukkan bukkan, meaning "bags made from grass"

Location
- Country: Australia
- State: Victoria
- Region: Australian Alps (IBRA), Victorian Alps, East Gippsland
- Local government area: Shire of East Gippsland
- Locality: Suggan Buggan

Physical characteristics
- Source confluence: Berrima River and Freestone Creek
  - location: Alpine National Park
  - elevation: 695 m (2,280 ft)
- Mouth: confluence with the Snowy River
  - location: Victorian Alps
  - coordinates: 37°1′54″S 148°23′15″E
  - elevation: 192 m (630 ft)
- Length: 38 km (24 mi)

Basin features
- River system: Snowy River catchment
- Tributaries
  - left: Ingeegoodbee River
  - right: James Creek, Rocky Plains Creek
- National park: Alpine NP

The Suggan Buggan River is a perennial river of the Snowy River catchment, in the Alpine region of the Australian state of Victoria.

== Course and features ==
Formed by the confluence of the Berrima River and the Freestone Creek, the Suggan Buggan River rises in a remote alpine wilderness area within the Alpine National Park, south of the Black-Allan Line that forms part of the state border between New South Wales and Victoria. The river flows generally southeast by south through the locality of Suggan Buggan, joined by the Ingeegoodbee River and two minor tributaries, before reaching its confluence with the Snowy River in the Shire of East Gippsland, north of the Snowy River National Park. The river descends 507 metres (1,663 ft) over its 38-kilometre (24 mi) course.

The river is traversed by the Snowy River Road (C608).

== Recreational activity ==
Bush walks in the area lead to Mount Stradbroke at 1,310 metres (4,300 ft) and Mount Cobberas at 1,836 metres (6,024 ft).

Many parts of the river are inaccessible during winter months.

== Etymology ==
The river's name is derived from the Aboriginal phrase bukkan bukkan, referring to "bags made from grass".

== History ==
=== Aboriginal history ===
The traditional custodians of the land surrounding the Suggan Buggan river are the Australian Aboriginal Bidawal and Nindi-Ngudjam Ngarigu Monero peoples.

=== European history ===
The first run in the district was taken up by William Woodhouse in 1843, who passed it on to Scottish-born Australian pioneer and entrepreneur Benjamin Boyd in 1845. The property was transferred to Edward O'Rourke in 1858, who had travelled south from the Monaro plains with his young family. He stayed for 25 years before moving south to Wulgulmerang, which began its life as another O'Rourke station, and then west to the Omeo station at Benambra. O'Rourke used local Murray pines to build the first permanent home in the area. O'Rourke's ownership ended in 1902 when the property was sold to John Churchill Rogers.

== See also ==
- List of rivers of Australia
