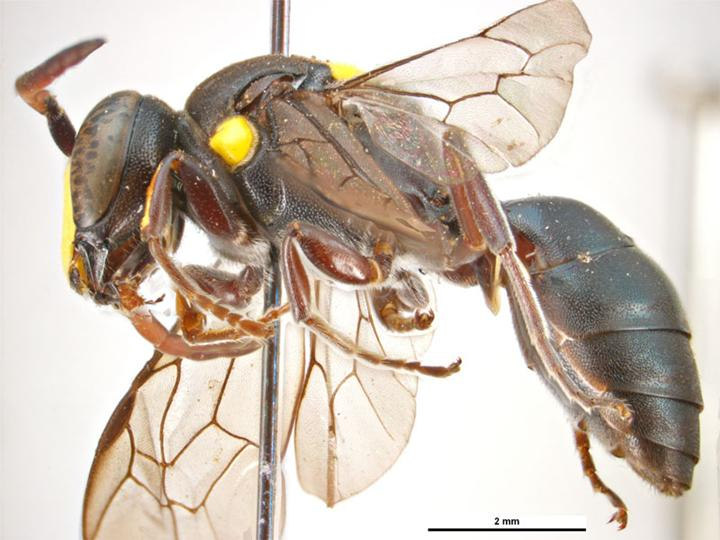
- Male

Scientific classification
- Kingdom: Animalia
- Phylum: Arthropoda
- Clade: Pancrustacea
- Class: Insecta
- Order: Hymenoptera
- Family: Colletidae
- Genus: Hylaeus
- Species: H. basilautus

Binomial name
- Hylaeus basilautus (Rayment, 1953)

Synonyms
- Meroglossa basilauta Rayment, 1953

= Hylaeus basilautus =

Species of bee

Hylaeus basilautus, or Hylaeus (Prosopisteron) basilautus, is a species of bee in the family Colletidae and subfamily Hylaeinae. It is endemic to Australia. It was described by Australian entomologist Tarlton Rayment in 1953.

== Description ==
Male body length is about 8 mm. Integumental colouration is mainly black, with yellow markings.

== Distribution and habitat ==
The species occurs in south-eastern Australia. The type locality is Jamberoo, on the New South Wales south coast. It has also been recorded from Gorae West in south-west Victoria.

Flowers of Leptospermum scoparium (manuka), a forage plant of the bees

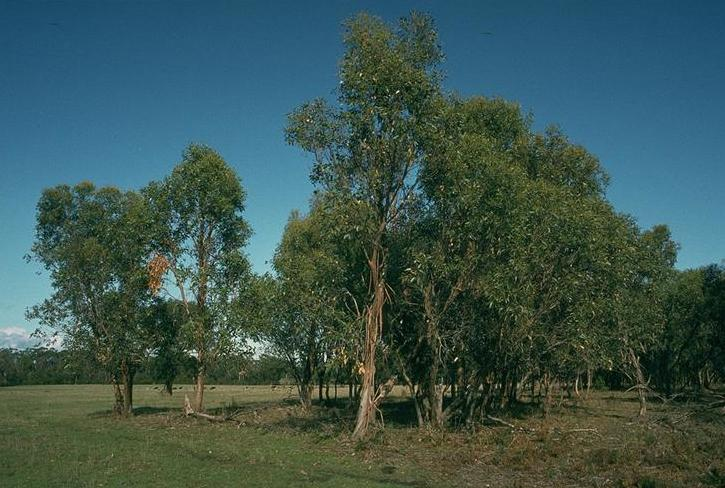
Eucalyptus kitsoniana (Gippsland mallee), a forage plant of the bees

== Behaviour ==
The adults are solitary flying mellivores. They nest in galleries in sound wood and have sedentary larvae. Flowering plants visited by the bees include Leptospermum scoparium and Eucalyptus kitsoniana, as well as mistletoe species.
