= Buchan River =

Buchan
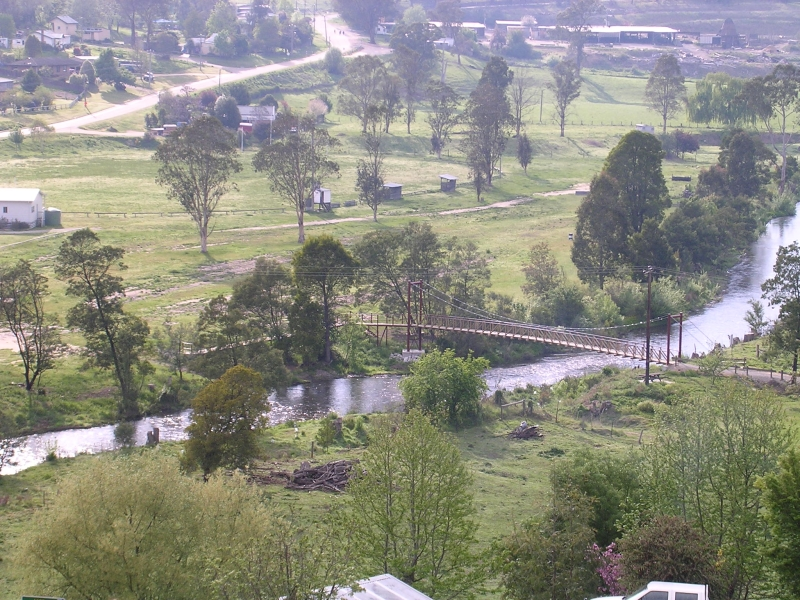
- Buchan River at Buchan, Victoria, 2006.

- Mouth of the Buchan River in Victoria
- Etymology: Aboriginal: bukkan bukkan or bukkan mungie, meaning "bags made from grass"

Location
- Country: Australia
- State: Victoria
- Region: Australian Alps (IBRA), Victorian Alps, East Gippsland
- Local government area: Shire of East Gippsland
- Locality: Buchan

Physical characteristics
- Source: below Blue Hill
  - location: Snowy River National Park
  - elevation: 1,090 m (3,580 ft)
- Mouth: confluence with the Snowy River
  - location: near Lucas Point
  - coordinates: 37°31′S 148°16′E
  - elevation: 41 m (135 ft)
- Length: 118 km (73 mi)

Basin features
- River system: Snowy River catchment
- National park: Alpine NP

The Buchan River (/bʌkən/ BUCK-ən) is a perennial river of the Snowy River catchment, in the Alpine region of the Australian state of Victoria.

== Course and features ==
The Buchan River rises below Blue Hill in a remote alpine wilderness area within the Alpine National Park, and flows generally south through the town of Buchan. The river is joined by the Murrindal River and eight minor tributaries, before reaching its confluence with the Snowy River near Lucas Point in the Shire of East Gippsland. The river descends 1,050 metres (3,440 ft) over its 118-kilometre (73 mi) course.

At Buchan, the river is traversed by Gelantipy Road, and a little further to the east, the Buchan Orbost Road.

== Etymology ==
The name Buchan is thought to be taken from the Aboriginal phrase bukkan bukkan or bukkan mungie, referring to bags made from grass.

== History ==
=== Aboriginal history ===
The traditional custodians of the land surrounding the upper reaches of the Buchan River are the Australian Aboriginal Bidawal and Nindi-Ngudjam Ngarigu Monero peoples; while in its lower reaches, the Gunaikurnai people identify the land surrounding Buchan as their traditional country.

At Cloggs Cave near Buchan, evidence has been found of Aboriginal occupation in prehistoric times.

=== European history ===
Pastoralists first entered the area surrounding the town of Buchan in the late 1830s. Buchan Station, taken up in the 1840s, had a succession of owners. To the north were the Gelantipy and Black Mountain runs. There were small groups of Aboriginals in the area but their numbers declined rapidly after European settlement. In 1861, Rev. John Bulmer inspected land south of Buchan as a possible site for a mission station. When he moved to Lake Tyers, the remaining Aboriginals accompanied him there. Land settlement began in 1870, with the best land along the river quickly taken up. A township was proclaimed in 1873, taking its name from the station. The Victorian Municipal Directory described the district in 1888.

== See also ==
- Buchan Caves
- List of rivers of Australia
