= Murrindal River =

River in Victoria, Australia

Murrindal
- Mouth of the Murrindal River in Victoria

Location
- Country: Australia
- State: Victoria
- Region: South East Corner (IBRA), East Gippsland
- Local government area: Shire of East Gippsland

Physical characteristics
- Source: below Butchers Ridge
  - location: west of Snowy River National Park
  - elevation: 702 m (2,303 ft)
- Mouth: confluence with the Buchan River
  - location: west of Lucas Point
  - coordinates: 37°30′7″S 148°14′22″E
  - elevation: 55 m (180 ft)
- Length: 42 km (26 mi)

Basin features
- River system: Snowy River catchment
- Tributaries
  - left: Butchers Creek

The Murrindal River is a perennial river of the Snowy River catchment, in the East Gippsland region of the Australian state of Victoria.

== Course and features ==
The Murrindal River rises below Butchers Ridge, and flows generally south, joined by one minor tributary, before reaching its confluence with the Buchan River west of Lucas Point in the Shire of East Gippsland. The river descends 647 metres (2,123 ft) over its 42-kilometre (26 mi) course.

At the locality of Murrindal, the river is traversed by the Gelantipy Road.

The traditional custodians of the land surrounding the upper reaches of the Murrindal River are the Australian Aboriginal Bidawal and Nindi-Ngudjam Ngarigu Monero peoples; while in its lower reaches, the Gunaikurnai people identify the land surrounding Buchan as their traditional country.

== See also ==
- List of rivers of Australia
