= Edmund Thiele =

Edmund Oswald Thiele (1874–1971), later known as Sir Edmund Oswald Teale KBE (he changed the spelling of his surname in 1917) was a prominent geologist from Doncaster, Victoria, Australia. He was created a knight in 1936 during Colonial service in Tanganyika Territory.

== Career ==
He began a Geological survey in the German colony of Tanganyika in 1908 but was obliged to return to Australia during the First World War. During this time he found employment as a temporary Lecturer in geology at the University of Adelaide, replacing Sir Douglas Mawson who had left for Britain to help the war effort. Between 1917 and 1918 Teale took up a research fellowship at the University of Melbourne. After the war Teale returned to East Africa as part of the geological survey until 1936.

Thiele/Teale also did some work in New Zealand with Albert Ernest Kitson and later helped Kitson discover the first diamonds in the Gold Coast.

== Personal life ==
He was born in Melbourne, Victoria in 1874. He was married to Charlotte Wilhelmina Stalker in 1909. They had two children, Margaret and Ronald. Edmund and Charlotte lived in Pirbright, England in their later years. Edmund died in 1971 leaving Charlotte a widow. Their son, Ronald Edmund Littlewood Teale, went on to become a missionary with his wife, who was also called, Margaret, in Papua New Guinea for 60 years. Ronald and Margaret have two daughters Esther Ingram and Ruth Clark as well as five grandchildren and ten great grandchildren.

== Selected publications ==
- Leonard Darwin, Tempest Anderson, A. E. Kitson, E. O. Thiele, ’Some New Zealand Volcanoes: Discussion’, The Geographical Journal, Vol. 40, No. 1 (Jul., 1912), pp. 23–25;
- A.E. Kitson & E.O.Thiele, ‘The Geography of the Upper Waitaki Basin, New Zealand’, Geographical Journal, vol. 36, 1910, p. 431.
- E. O. Teale, 'Outline of the geology of Tanganyika Territory,' Bull. No. 6, revised, Geol. Surv. Tanganyika Territory, I936.

== Sources ==
- Brief biography, Australian Forest History Society Newsletter 39, December 2004, p. 5.
- , British Geological Survey site
- This page in the London Gazette talks about the King conferring knighthood on a list of men. This page shows Edmund Oswald Teale as one of the recipients.
