= John Dennant =

John Dennant (1839 – 12 June 1907) was an English-born educational administrator and geologist, president of the Royal Society of Victoria in 1903.

Dennant was born in Ipswich, Suffolk. He migrated to the Colony of Victoria in 1872 and was a headmaster from 1879, and Inspector of Schools in Victoria from 1890. He was also a Fellow of the Geological Society of London.

Dennant prepared a report on the 'Estimation of Alkalies in Igneous Rocks' for the second meeting of the Australasian Association for the Advancement of Science in 1890.

Diastopora dennanti is named in honour of John Dennant.

== Publications ==
- Dennant, J., and Kitson, A. E., 'Catalogue of the described species of fossils (except Bryozoa and Foraminifera) in the Cainozoic fauna of Victoria, South Australia, and Tasmania (with locality plan)'. Records of the Geological Survey of Victoria, 1(2), 1903, pp. 89–147.
