= Albert Kitson =

British/Australian geologist and naturalist (1868–1937)

Sir Albert Ernest Kitson
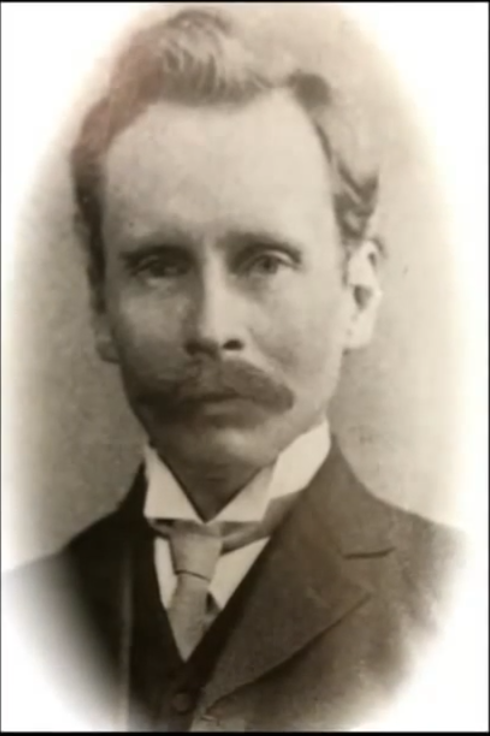
- Born: 21 March 1868; Audenshaw, Cheshire, England
- Died: 8 March 1937 (aged 68); Beaconsfield, England
- Citizenship: British, Australian
- Education: Royal Melbourne Institute of Technology, University of Melbourne
- Spouses: Mary Legge, née Walker (m. 1910–1920) Elinore Almond Ramage (m. 1927–1937)
- Awards: 1927 Lyell Medal of the Geological Society of London; Order of the British Empire; Order of St Michael and St George; KBE
- Scientific career
- Fields: Geology and natural history
- Workplaces: Geological Survey of Victoria, Australia

Sir Albert Ernest Kitson, CMG, CBE (21 March 1868 – 8 March 1937) was a British-Australian geologist, naturalist, and winner of the Lyell Medal in 1927.

== Early life ==
Kitson was born in North Street, Audenshaw, Cheshire, England, the son of John Kitson from Manchester and Margaret, née Neil, from Edinburgh, Scotland. On his father's side the family had been stonemasons, while his maternal grandfather was a Scottish Presbyterian minister. Albert's early childhood was spent in Nagpur in the Central Provinces of India where his family moved when he was a year old. Around 1876 they emigrated to Victoria. Here John and Margaret taught at a State School in the gold-mining settlement of Enoch's Point in the Victorian Alps before John was appointed as head teacher of the, recently created, North Winton State School near Benalla. John died of angina in 1879 and so until her death in 1898 Margaret took over the running of the school which was attended by both her surviving children – Albert and his younger brother (John) Sidney.

== Career ==
Albert Kitson joined the Public Service in Victoria in 1886 as a clerk. Whilst still employed in this function he also carried out geological field work. This fired a passion and encouraged him to take up part-time studies in geology at the Working Men's College (now the Royal Melbourne Institute of Technology) and subsequently at the University of Melbourne. By 1903, he had risen to become second-in-command of the Geological Survey of Victoria of which he subsequently became senior geologist and for a time acting director. He contributed a number of studies on the mineral resources of Victoria and the Glacial beds of Tasmania. In 1907, Albert Kitson recommended that the Buchan Caves in Gippsland, Victoria be set aside as a reservation to protect them from vandalism.

After his initial work in Victoria, Kitson spent much of his subsequent professional life in Africa. Recognising his geological talents Professor J. W. Gregory recommended him for a post as Principal mineral surveyor in Southern Nigeria where he went on to discover coal and lignite. In 1909 he discovered black bituminous coal along the Enugu-Udi escarpment in Nigeria and high hopes were placed in such a potentially important coal deposit. The town of Port Harcourt was built in 1912 as an outlet for this Nigerian coal and was linked with Enugu via a railway line that extended northwards to Kaduna. The Enugu coal fields went into production in 1915 and caused an important immigration of population to Enugu earning the town the nickname of the "Coal City". The Nigerian coal turned out to be of poor quality and was used mainly for domestic consumption within the colonies, providing an important power resource for the railways and electricity.

Although Kitson's mission was to discover mineral deposits which might be exploited by the British colonial authority he always combined this with a paternalistic concern to improve the material situation of the local populations. In 1912, after hearing a lecture by J. P. Unstead about the climatic conditions for wheat cultivation in North America, Kitson's response was to ask whether Unstead's findings might be applied to Nigeria. Kitson argued: "Could a wheat-growing industry be established it would be a great boon to the people of West Africa." In paternalistic tones he went on: "It might in Northern Nigeria replace to a large extent the less valuable millet now grown there, while in Southern Nigeria it could materially supplement the staple foods- cassava, yams and maize".

After Nigeria, Kitson continued his explorations in Africa, along with Edmund Thiele, working particularly in the Gold Coast (now Ghana) between 1913 and 1930 where he was first Principal of the Mineral Survey and afterwards Director of the Geological Survey. Kitson travelled round the colony by train and bicycle and discovered sizeable mineral deposits including bauxite and manganese. He discovered Bauxite, the raw material of alumina, in the Atewa Range near Kibi in 1914. The first manganese ore which he discovered was in May 1914 when he found occurrences near the Sekondi-Kumassi Railway about 6 miles (9.7 km) from Tarkwa. These deposits were important to Britain's war effort, as supplies of these minerals from other locations had become difficult. During the last year of the war 32 000 tons of manganese, used in munitions production, were shipped to Britain from the deposits Kitson had found in the Gold Coast. Then in February 1919, together with his colleague E. O. Teale (formerly Thiele), he discovered on the Birim River the first deposits of diamonds to be found in the Gold Coast. The diamonds were of small size but high quality. Kitson observed that they were good crystals showing octahedron and dodecahedron. This proved to be a particularly valuable source of diamonds and the exportation of diamonds grew spectacularly. In 1934 the 2,172,563 carats (434.5126 kg) of diamonds exported from the Gold Coast accounted for 39% of the world's supply that year.

Kitson is also associated with the development of hydro-electric power in the Gold Coast/Ghana. In 1915 he was the first to recommend building a dam at Akosombo on the Volta River to generate hydro-electricity, hoping to use this to process the bauxite deposits that he had discovered in the Kwahu plateau the previous year. It was not until 1965 that the idea of the dam was put into effect when Ghana's first black president, Dr Kwame Nkrumah, decided to generate hydropower as a means of modernizing the economy. This development created Lake Volta, the largest man-made lake in the world.

== Late life ==
After his retirement from the Gold Coast in 1930 Kitson moved to Beaconsfield, Buckinghamshire, where he called his house "Benalta" (a reference to the original name of Benalla), as an indication of his enduring passion for Australia. Here he continued to be consulted on geological questions connected to Africa. In particular he reported on goldfields in Kenya during the so-called Kakamega Gold Rush of the early 1930s where gold-mining once again showed its disrespect for the rights of local communities and the environment. In his report for the Colonial Office Kitson suggested that possibly as much as half of the gold being prospected was wasted by amateur techniques. In an article for the magazine The Spectator, Kitson compared the influx of amateur gold-prospectors to a similar situation in Klondike in Canada in 1897-8 : "The road to Kakamega now resembles a miniature 'trail of 98' without the snow. Old mining men, from ex-Klondyke Pioneers to Australian backwoodsmen, are hurrying to the spot". But it seems that Kitson's initial report had helped create the rush in the first place by highlighting the rich pickings available. As The Spectator noted: "Since the publication of Sir Albert Kitson's report, the population of the Kakamega goldfields had doubled". Kitson's article in this magazine merely fuelled the rush still further.

Numerous honours came Kitson's way in recognition of his work. He was appointed Commander of the Order of the British Empire (CBE) in 1918 and Companion of the Order of St Michael and St George (CMG) in 1922. In 1927 Kitson was knighted for his services to geology. The Geological Society of London elected him as a fellow in 1897, awarded him the Wollaston fund in 1918 before honouring him with the very prestigious Lyell Medal in 1927, an annual award given to an outstanding Earth Scientist. In 1929 he was appointed as President of the Geology Section of the British Association for the Advancement of Science and, following his retirement, he became President of the Geologists' Association in 1934. Kitson was an official representative of the British Government at International Geological Congresses (four times) and at World Power Conferences (four times). One of the Buchan Caves in Victoria Australia is named after him, as are a fossil mollusk, a fossil eucalypt and a living eucalypt. The Eucalyptus tree Eucalyptus kitsoniana (Gippsland Malee) bears his name, as does the lizard Panaspis kitsoni (sometimes considered a synonym of Panaspis togoensis). Kitson Avenue in Takoradi in modern-day Ghana is named in his honour as is Kitson Court in Benalla, Victoria, Australia and Kitson Place in the Florey suburb of Canberra, Australia.

For his obituary the journal Nature wrote: "SIR ALBERT KITSON, whose death occurred on 8 March, was a geologist of world-wide repute, and the discoveries which he made and which are now being exploited in many parts of the world entitle him to be classed as one of the foremost economic geologists of his time."

From his earliest age, Kitson took an interest in the natural world around him. Throughout his career he collected fossils which he would send to museums in Victoria and London. He was fascinated by the Victorian Lyrebird, publishing an article on it for the Smithsonian Institution. In the Australian bush he learnt a facility to handle snakes and this would later earn him a reputation on the Gold Coast as a fetish priest. He was also a keen photographer. By the end of his first three years in the Gold Coast he had taken around 450 photos of the colony. Many of these are preserved in Ghana's national archive (where they are wrongly attributed to E. A. Kitson). Kitson was also noted for his keen amateur interest in archeology, finding numerous artefacts which he made available to Museums in Africa and England.

Nicknamed "Kittie", Kitson was a very religious serious-minded man and a teetotaller. He was quite strict as J. N. F. Green makes clear: "Lifelong self-discipline gave Kitson exceptional powers of endurance and concentration in difficult and trying conditions. Somewhat of a driver in the field, he never spared himself, taking the heaviest burden." L. J. Spencer, formerly keeper of minerals at the British Museum, described Kitson as "a most energetic little man; his constant companion was a small prospecting pan". Spencer remembered "a journey with him in 1924 in the mining districts of northern Ontario; at every halt of the train he was out with his little pan in any ditch he could find". At the award of his Lyell medal, Ormsby-Gore spoke of "his tireless energy, but his attractive and stimulating personality".

In 1910 he married Margaret Legge, née Walker (1870–1920). After her death he married Elinore Almond Ramage (1892–1963) in 1927. Like his mother she was the daughter of a Scottish Presbyterian minister, although she herself was born in Victoria, Australia. Despite their advancing years (the couple had a combined age of around 100) they had two children: (Ernest) Neil (1928–2009) and David (1935–2011), the latter was the father of British-New Zealand historian Simon Kitson (b. 1967). Albert Kitson died in Beaconsfield on 8 March 1937 of broncho-pneumonia and influenza.

Sir Albert Kitson is sometimes wrongly referred to as Sir Arthur Kitson or Sir Alfred Kitson. He is also sometimes confused with his contemporary Albert Kitson, 2nd Baron Airdale (1863–1944) who does not appear to be related.

== Sources ==
- The Times, 9 March 1937;
- Proceedings of the Geological Society, Vol. LXXXIII, 1927, pp. XLVI- XLVII;
- John Frederick Norman Green, "Obituary: Albert Ernest Kitson", Quarterly Journal, Geological Society no. 94, 1938, pp. CXXV—CXXVII;
- L. J. Spencer, 'Biographical notes of mineralogists recently deceased', The Mineralogical Magazine and Journal of the Mineralogical Society, no 165, June 1939, Vol. XXV;
- John M. Saul, Arthur J. Boucot, Robert M. Finks, "Fauna of the Accraian Series (Devonian of Ghana) including a Revision of the Gastropod Plectonotus", Journal of Paleontology, Vol. 37, No. 5 (September 1963), pp. 1042–1053;
- N. R. Junner & F. A. Bannister, The Diamond Deposits of the Gold Coast with Notes on Other Diamond Deposits in West Africa, GCGS, Gold Coast, 1943;
- H. Service & J. A. Dunn, The Geology of the Nsuta Manganese Ore Deposits, GCGS, Kensington printer, 1943; "A Special Correspondent", "The Volta River Project", African Affairs, Vol. 55, No. 221 (October 1956), pp. 287–293;
- Ann Brower Stahl, "Innovation, diffusion, and culture contact: The holocene archaeology of Ghana", Journal of World Prehistory, Volume 8, Number 1, March 1994, pp. 51–112.

== Kitson's publications include ==
- A. E. Kitson, "The Gold Coast", The Geographical Journal, vol XLVIII, no 5, November 1916, pp. 369–392;
- A. E. Kitson, "Proposed reservation of limestone caves in the Buchan District, Eastern Gippland", Rec. geol. Surv. Vict., 1907, II(I) :37–44;
- Leonard Darwin, Tempest Anderson, A. E. Kitson, E. O. Thiele, 'Some New Zealand Volcanoes: Discussion', The Geographical Journal, Vol. 40, No. 1 (July 1912), pp. 23–25;
- Major Darwin, Walter Egerton, Dr. Falconer & A. E. Kitson, "Southern Nigeria: Some Considerations of Its Structure, People, and Natural History: Discussion", The Geographical Journal, Vol. 41, No. 1 (Jan. 1913), pp. 34–38;
- A. E. Kitson, "The Economic Minerals and Rocks of Victoria", Department of Mines, Special Report, Melbourne; J. Kemp, Acting Government Printer; 1906. pp. 517–536;
- Percy Cox, K. S. Sandford, Vaughan Cornish, L. J. Spencer, Albert E. Kitson, R. A. Bagnold, "The Movement of Desert Sand: Discussion", The Geographical Journal, Vol. 85, No. 4 (April 1935), pp. 365–369;
- A. Kitson, "First Report on Kakamega Goldfield, Kenya", Mining Journal, London, 12 November 1932, pp. 757–8;
- A. E. Kitson, "Notes on the Victoria Lyre-Bird". Smithsonian Institution, Annual Report, 1906, 363–374;
- Percy Cox, H. H. Austin, Albert E. Kitson, W. Campbell Smith, E. B. Worthington, 'Teleki's Volcano and the Lava Fields at the Southern End of Lake Rudolf: Discussion",The Geographical Journal, Vol. 85, No. 4 (April 1935), pp. 336–341
- Prof. Myres, R. H. Curtis, W. P. Rutter, J. Wrigley, A. E. Kitson, J. F. Unstead, "The Climatic Limits of Wheat Cultivation, with Special Reference to North America: Discussion', The Geographical Journal, Vol. 39, No. 5 (May 1912), pp. 441–446
- A. E. Kitson, "The possibility of Bui Gorge as the site of hydro-electric station". Gold Coast. Geological Survey Bulletin No. 1. Accra, Gold Coast, 1925;
- Albert Kitson, Memorandum On the Operations of the Geological Survey Department of the Gold Coast, 1913–30. Gold Coast, No. XXII of 1930–31. Accra: Printed by the Government Printer at the Government Printing Office, 1930;
- A. E. Kitson, "Observations on the geology of Mount Mary and the lower Werribee Valley". Proceedings of the Royal Society of Victoria 14, 1902 pp. 153–165;
- John Dennant, & A. E. Kitson, "Catalogue of the described species of fossils (except Bryozoa and Foraminifera) in the Cainozoic fauna of Victoria, South Australia and Tasmania". Records of the Geological Survey of Victoria 1, 1903, pp. 89–147;
- A. E. Kitson, Report on the Discovery of Diamonds at Abomosa, Northwest of Kibbi, Eastern Province, Gold Coast, Govt. Press, Accra, Gold Coast, 1919;
- A. E. Kitson & E. O.Thiele, "The Geography of the Upper Waitaki Basin, New Zealand", Geographical Journal, vol. 36, 1910, p. 431.
