= Cloggs Cave =

Cave in Victoria, Australia

- location in Australia Cloggs Cave (Australia)
- 37°31′S 148°10′E
- Location: Snowy River gorge, near Buchan, Victoria
- Region: Australia

Site notes
- Excavation dates: 1970s
- Archaeologists: Josephine Flood

Cloggs Cave is a limestone cave and rockshelter with significant Aboriginal archaeological deposits, located on a cliff along the Snowy River gorge near the town of Buchan, Victoria.

The cave was within the country of the Krowathunkooloong (Krauatungalung) clan of the Gunaikurnai nation. The roof of the rock shelter outside the cave is heavily blackened, evidently from campfires. A passage leads to an inner chamber with a high cathedral-like roof. Cloggs Cave was the first Pleistocene occupation site to be found with intact bone. Evidence of bones from megafauna and extinct marsupials was found to be dated between 27,500 and 24,500 years old, but were not associated with the human occupation layers.

The first European known to have found the cave was Josephine Flood, when driving to another site in eastern Victoria. Her subsequent excavations within the dry floor of the rock shelter revealed extensive evidence of stone tool-making from the Australian Small Tool Tradition, with the basal layer dated to the last 1,000 years. Further inside the cave dates from the excavation showed the site was probably first occupied around 17,000 years ago, but appears to have been abandoned by 1,000 years when the outer area was occupied. Based on the relatively small quantities of discarded stone tools, the site has been interpreted as an intermittently occupied hunting site rather than a permanent campsite, with deeply stratified layers containing both stone and bone tools along with ochre and a rich faunal assemblage. The artefact assemblage is from what is described as the Australian Core Tool and Scraper Tradition.

The cave was also important in demonstrating the antiquity of Aboriginal occupation in south-east Australia and for its almost continuous sequence of occupation layers, extending into the post European settlement period in the 1830s and 1860s.

An excavation reported in early 2021 revealed microscopic remains of bogong moth on a small grinding stone, estimated to be about 2,000 years old. This is the world's earliest stone artefact showing confirmed evidence of insect food remains. The Gunaikurnai people were one of several Aboriginal peoples who used to travel to the mountains to obtain the high-fat, energy-rich moths as food, and stories of these travels had been passed down in their oral history. The excavation was done by researchers from Monash University in collaboration with the traditional owners, represented by the Gunaikurnai Land and Waters Corporation.

The findings were analysed using a special staining process. After the residues were placed on a microscope slide, they were stained with a special dye which turned fluorescent, which aided identification of the collagen and proteins, being the remains of the moth left on the rock.

== See also ==
- New Guinea II cave
- Buchan Caves
