= Ingeegoodbee River =

River in Victoria, Australia

Ingeegoodbee Ingeegoodbee Creek
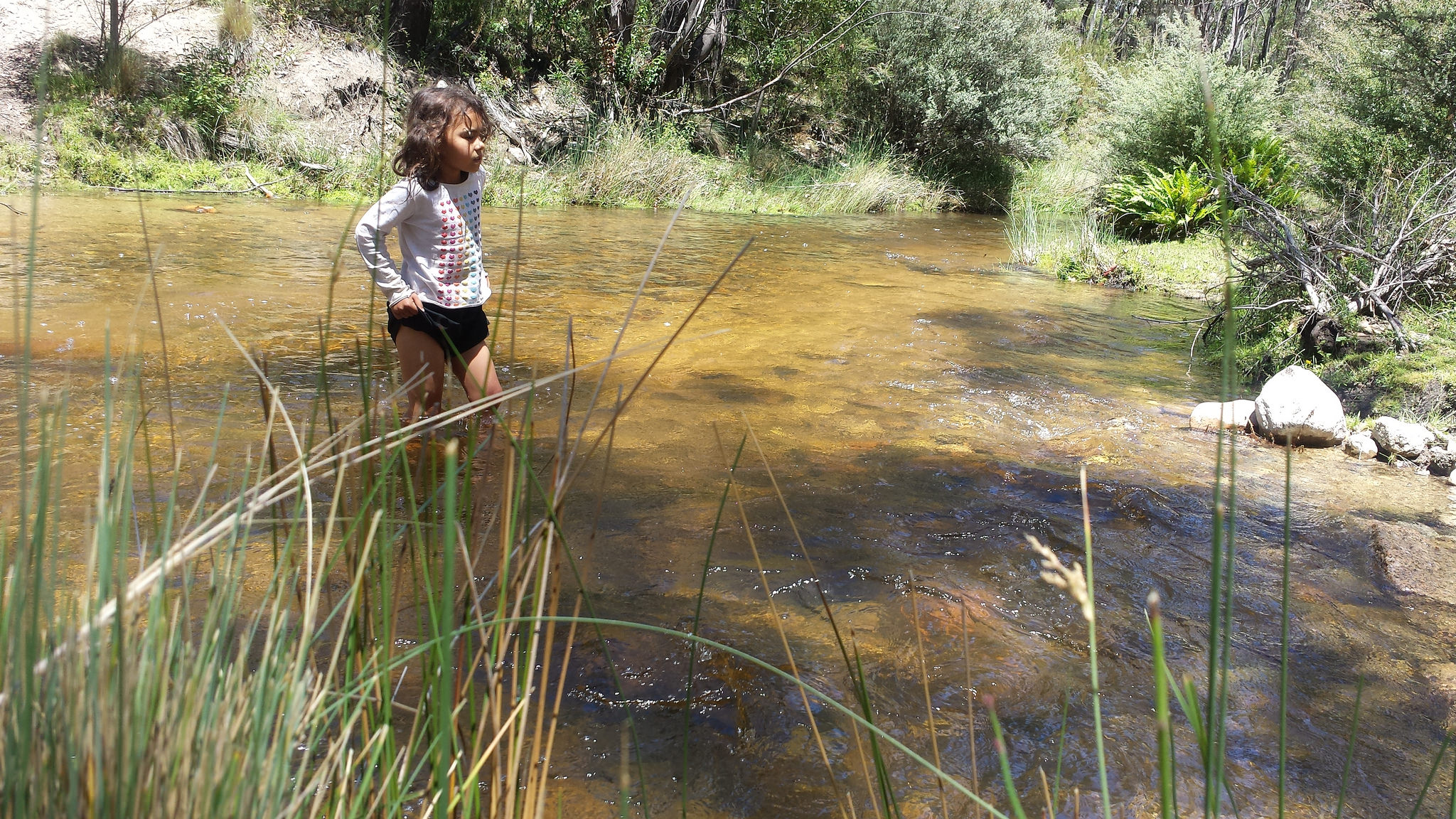
- A child crossing the Ingeegoodbee River, Australia

- Location of the Ingeegoodbee River mouth, south of the Black-Allan Line, in Victoria

Location
- Country: Australia
- States: New South Wales, Victoria
- Region: Australian Alps (IBRA), Snowy Mountains, Victorian Alps
- Local government areas: Snowy Monaro Regional Council, East Gippsland

Physical characteristics
- Source: Snowy Mountains
  - location: south of Thredbo, Snowy Mountains, New South Wales
  - coordinates: 36°45′S 148°15′E
  - elevation: 1,340 m (4,400 ft)
- Mouth: confluence with the Suggan Buggan River
  - location: south of the Black-Allan Line, Victorian Alps, Victoria
  - coordinates: 36°52′29″S 148°19′28″E
  - elevation: 514 m (1,686 ft)
- Length: 31 km (19 mi)

Basin features
- River system: Snowy River catchment
- Tributaries
  - right: Musk Creek
- National parks: Kosciuszko NP, Alpine NP

The Ingeegoodbee River is a perennial river of the Snowy River catchment, in the Alpine regions of the states of New South Wales and Victoria, Australia.

== Course and features ==
The Ingeegoodbee River rises in alpine country within the Snowy Mountain Range contained within Kosciuszko National Park, south of Thredbo in New South Wales. The river flows generally southeast by south and then southwest, flowing across the Black-Allan Line that forms part of the border between Victoria and New South Wales, joined by one minor tributary, before reaching its confluence with the Suggan Buggan River within the Alpine National Park in Victoria. The river descends 826 metres (2,710 ft) over its 31-kilometre (19 mi) course.

== See also ==
- List of rivers of New South Wales (A–K)
- List of rivers of Australia
- Rivers of New South Wales
