= New Guinea II cave =

Rock shelter and archaeological site in Australia

- Location in Australia New Guinea II cave (Australia)
- 37°23′5″S 148°21′3.6″E
- Location: near Buchan, Victoria
- Region: Australia

Site notes
- Excavation dates: 1980s
- Archaeologists: Paul Ossa

New Guinea II is a limestone cave and rockshelter on the Snowy River at the end of New Guinea Track, near Buchan, Victoria. The cave was within the country of the Krowathunkooloong clan of the Gunaikurnai nation. The deep cave system has an overhanging cliff that creates a rock shelter at the entrance facing the river. Excavations in the 1980s carried out by archaeologist Paul Ossa and a team from La Trobe University found stone artefacts, and other signs of occupation that were dated to almost 20,000 BP.

New Guinea II is one of three major cave systems that have so far been investigated in the middle Snowy River area, along with New Guinea Cave (NG-1), and Nuigini Namba Fav Cave (NG-5, NG-6. New Guinea II is largely joint-controlled, although the entrance area is formed along bedding planes and has a large chamber and passage with a perennial stream and several entrances. Finger or tool marks made in the dried mud on the cave wall are thought to be of prehistoric Aboriginal origin and are similar to those of Koonalda Cave on the Nullarbor Plain. New Guinea II is the first place where such markings have been recorded in Victoria. Animal origin has been proposed for the wall markings, although many appear to be in regular patterns, including circles and diagonal crosses. They are also generally on smoother parts of the walls and some are in now-dark and inaccessible parts of the cave.

The cave is used by bent-winged bats, which congregate in the large chamber, deep inside the cave.

The cave has been occupied intermittently for more than 20,000 years (21,900 +900/-800 BP and 4,660 ± 110 BP) with a small, but constant amount of lithic material and bone artefacts, as well as evidence of a hearth on a dry floor near the stream within the cave. Vertebrate fauna remains are abundant but mostly of non-cultural origin, representing animals that used the cave at times it was vacated by humans.

The artefact assemblage is similar to that at the nearby Cloggs Cave in Buchan, and in conjunction with Birrigai in the ACT they represent a general signature of human occupation and resource exploitation of the southeastern uplands during the Pleistocene. This reveals a non-intensive use of caves and shelters and consumption of local fauna. In comparison, southwestern Tasmanian Pleistocene sites appear to have a different signature of cave occupation and the primacy of a single vertebrate resource.

== See also ==
- Cloggs Cave
- Buchan Caves
