= Suggan Buggan =

Locality in the Shire of East Gippsland, Victoria, Australia

- Town
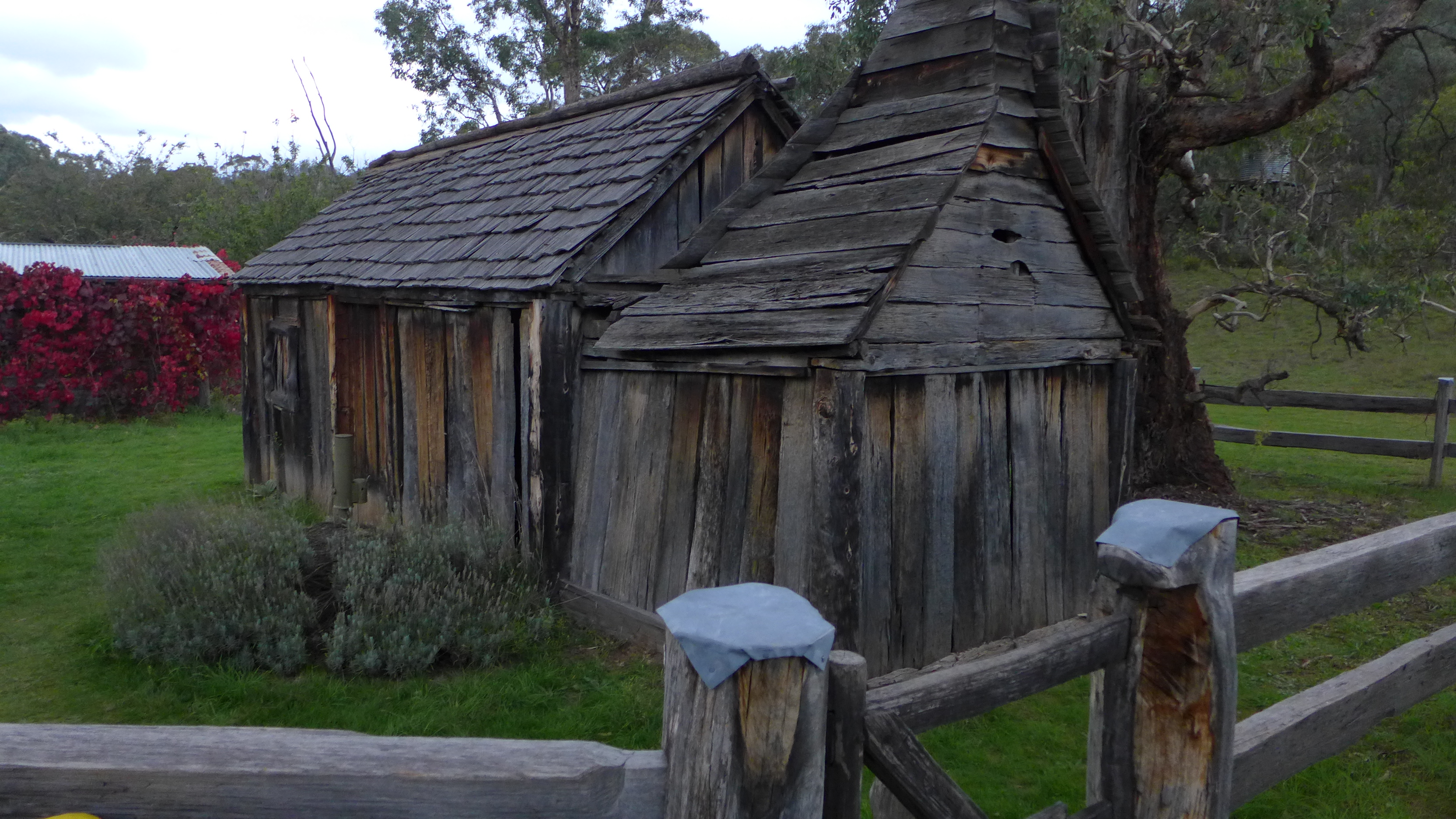
- This entirely wooden schoolhouse was built in 1865.

- Coordinates: 36°57′11″S 148°19′33″E
- Country: Australia
- State: Victoria
- LGA: Shire of East Gippsland

Government
  - State electorate: Gippsland East
  - Federal division: Division of Gippsland

Population
  - Total: 5 (2021 census)
- Time zone: UTC+10 (AEST)
  - Summer (DST): UTC+11 (AEST)
- Postcode: 3885

Suggan Buggan is a locality in the Shire of East Gippsland, Victoria, Australia. It is located on the border with New South Wales. At the 2021 census, Suggan Buggan had a population of 5.

The traditional custodians of the area are the Australian Aboriginal Bidawal and Nindi-Ngudjam Ngarigu Monero peoples. The name of the locality supposedly derives from the Aboriginal phrase "bukkan bukkan", which describes bags made from grass.

Suggan Buggan is surrounded by the Alpine National Park. There is a free camping area on the Suggan Buggan River. Several historical remains exist, including a well preserved 1860s wooden schoolhouse and an old house.

== Gallery ==
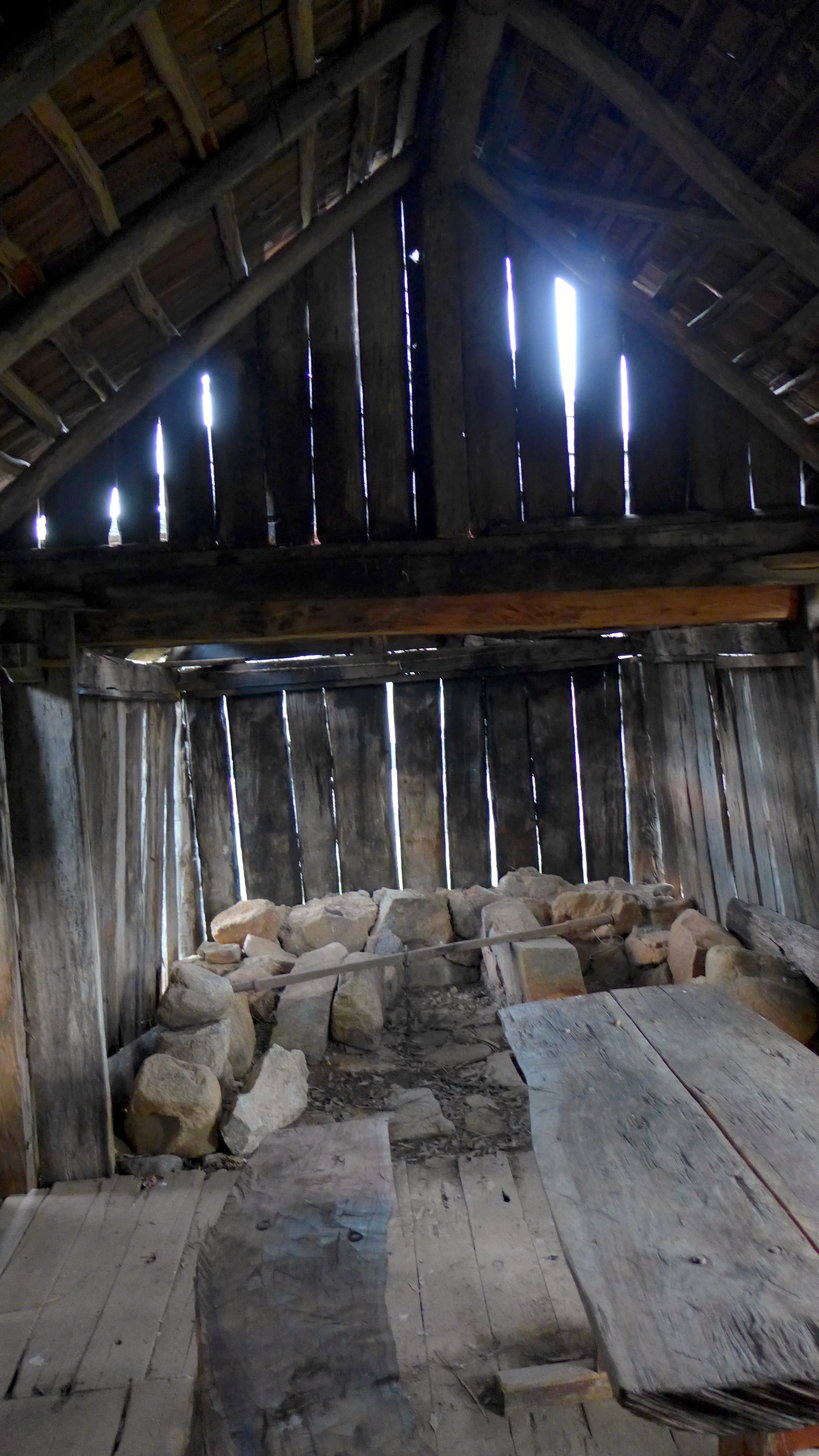
Interior of the schoolhouse.

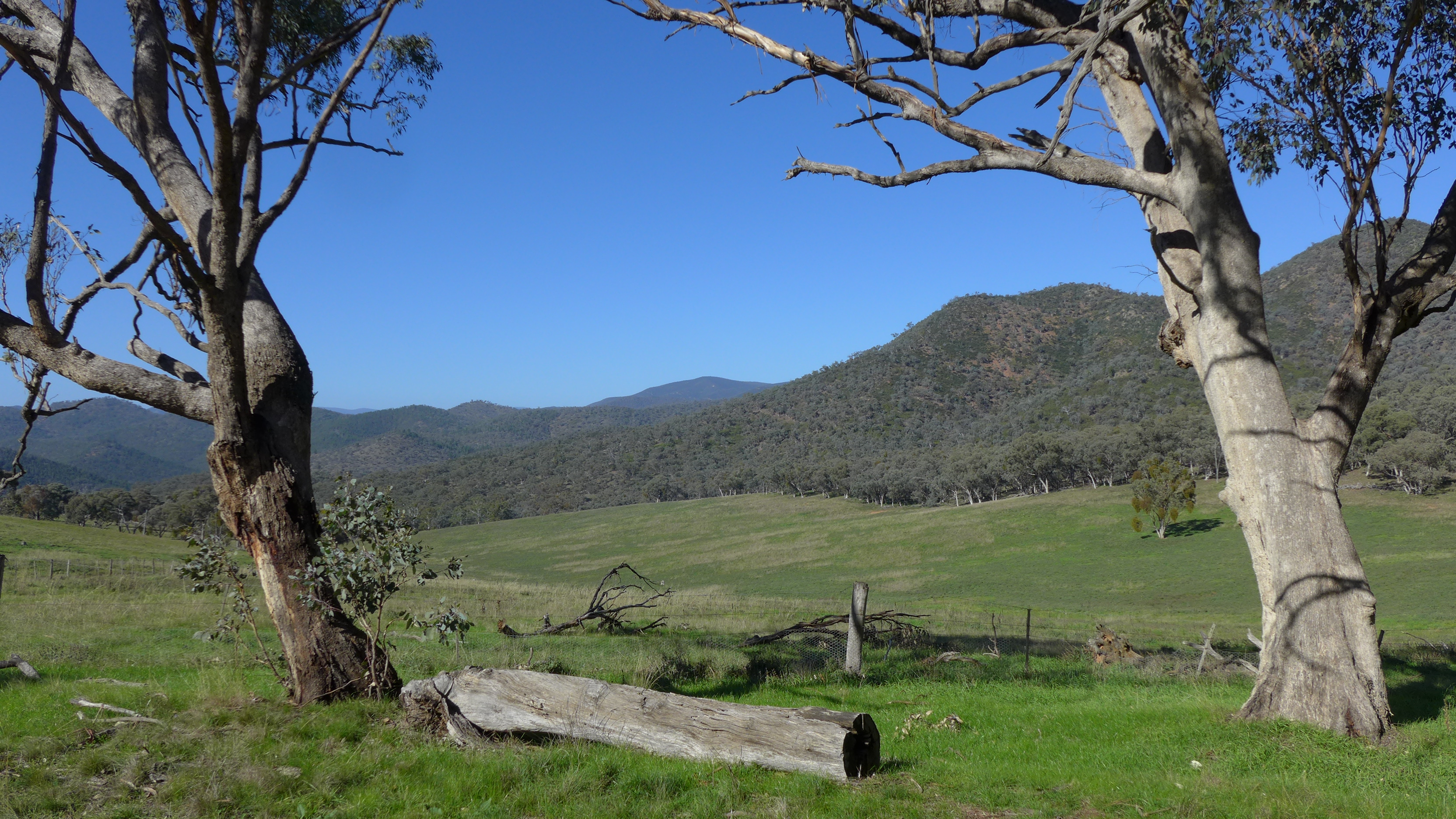
Farming area around Suggan Buggan
