= Gelantipy =

- Town
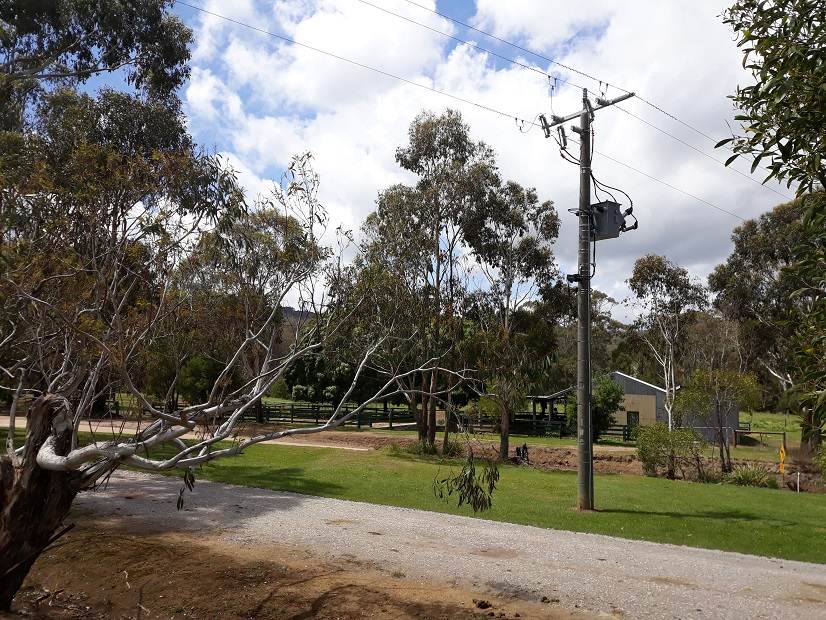

- Coordinates: 37°13′12″S 148°15′36″E
- Country: Australia
- State: Victoria
- LGA: Shire of East Gippsland

Government
  - State electorate: Gippsland East
  - Federal division: Gippsland
- Elevation: 755 m (2,477 ft)

Population
  - Total: 20 (2016 census)
- Postcode: 3885
- Mean max temp: 16.6 °C (61.9 °F)
- Mean min temp: 6.8 °C (44.2 °F)
- Annual rainfall: 796.4 mm (31.35 in)

Gelantipy is a locality in the Shire of East Gippsland, Victoria, Australia.

Mount Gelantipy, notable for its old growth alpine ash forests is 12 km. east within the Snowy River National Park.

The Karoonda Park hostel on Gelantipy Road includes a local bus stop and unstaffed fuel service (business hours). The Gelantipy Cemetery, Public Hall and Reserve are several kilometres south, alongside Butchers Creek.

== History ==
The traditional owners of the lands that are now called Gelantipy are the Gunai people.

The Scot Edward Bayliss established the Gelantipy pastoral run in 1839 for his employer Edward Lord, a merchant.

Gelantipy was a mining area in addition to timber milling and livestock production. The East Gippsland Shire Thematic Environmental History (2005) says:

"Traces of silver and lead were found as early as 1857 in the Buchan district. Over the ensuing years, a number of companies mined in the area, around Back Creek, Murrindal, Mt Tara, Canni Creek, Gelantipy and Mt Deddick areas. The government provided a battery but most mining ceased by 1907. Little remains to mark the sites of these mines. …At the Campbells Knob Mine near Gelantipy, where silver was mined in the 1890s, two mine adits are visible but no trace remains of the small settlement near the mine."

The history also records that there was a sawmill at Gelantipy in the period after World War Two. This was operated by Gibbs Bright & Co.

Bushfires affected the region in 1952, 2003 and 2014. In 2018 an upgraded CFA fire station was opened next to the district Bush Nursing Centre.

Frank Moon, who developed the Buchan Caves for tourism in the early 1900s, was born in Gelantipy.

=== Seldom Seen Roadhouse ===
Seldom Seen is a remote locality in the Victorian Alps (High Country), just north of Gelantipy and close to the Snowy River.

The Seldom Seen Roadhouse was located near 5373 Gelantipy Road, Wulgulmerang East, about 30 km. from the NSW border.

Between Buchan in Victoria and Jindabyne in New South Wales, the roadhouse was the only place for fuel along the Snowy. Dave "Mobil" Woodburn was the owner.

The owner relied on the small tourist trade during the 1990s and 2000s. Before the alpine bushfires of 2003, Seldom Seen Roadhouse was a typical 1960s-era petrol station. By March 2005, the roadhouse was trading from a caravan, which was then replaced with a more permanent structure.

However trade was steadily diminishing. A few tourist buses from Melbourne would make the trip through Seldom Seen daily. This bus route also stopped around 2010. Dave Woodburn died in 2012, and since then the buildings have been cleared; all that remains is a hut and a Telstra payphone.

== Climate ==
Due to its south-facing location, it is often much cooler at Gelantipy during the daytime than at higher elevations further north (such as at Jindabyne), particularly in the summer. Snowfalls are common throughout the year, sometimes falling in late spring to early summer.

Climate data for Gelantipy (1992–2023); 755 m AMSL; 37.22° S, 148.26° E
Month	Jan	Feb	Mar	Apr	May	Jun	Jul	Aug	Sep	Oct	Nov	Dec	Year
Record high °C (°F)	39.2 (102.6)	39.2 (102.6)	33.9 (93.0)	30.8 (87.4)	22.6 (72.7)	18.3 (64.9)	18.5 (65.3)	21.6 (70.9)	27.4 (81.3)	29.0 (84.2)	34.9 (94.8)	36.5 (97.7)	39.2 (102.6)
Mean daily maximum °C (°F)	24.0 (75.2)	23.0 (73.4)	20.5 (68.9)	16.6 (61.9)	12.9 (55.2)	10.2 (50.4)	9.7 (49.5)	11.1 (52.0)	14.0 (57.2)	16.6 (61.9)	19.1 (66.4)	21.4 (70.5)	16.6 (61.9)
Mean daily minimum °C (°F)	11.9 (53.4)	11.5 (52.7)	9.9 (49.8)	7.2 (45.0)	4.9 (40.8)	3.1 (37.6)	2.3 (36.1)	2.9 (37.2)	4.5 (40.1)	6.1 (43.0)	8.1 (46.6)	9.7 (49.5)	6.8 (44.3)
Record low °C (°F)	1.8 (35.2)	3.1 (37.6)	1.2 (34.2)	−0.9 (30.4)	−1.7 (28.9)	−3.5 (25.7)	−4.0 (24.8)	−3.5 (25.7)	−2.3 (27.9)	−2.0 (28.4)	0.0 (32.0)	0.6 (33.1)	−4.0 (24.8)
Average precipitation mm (inches)	65.6 (2.58)	65.6 (2.58)	63.4 (2.50)	57.2 (2.25)	48.2 (1.90)	70.6 (2.78)	55.6 (2.19)	54.4 (2.14)	58.4 (2.30)	71.6 (2.82)	96.4 (3.80)	72.7 (2.86)	780.2 (30.72)
Average precipitation days	12.3	11.9	13.8	13.8	14.2	14.1	15.0	13.8	14.4	14.9	14.7	13.9	166.8
Average afternoon relative humidity (%)	55	58	60	61	68	69	68	61	60	60	61	58	62
