= Common maidenhair fern =

Common maidenhair fern is a common name for several plants and may refer to:

- Adiantum aethiopicum
- Adiantum capillus-veneris
