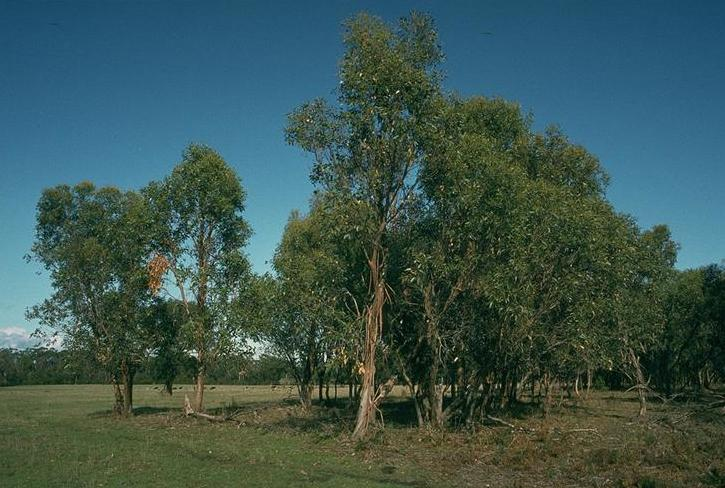

Conservation status
- Endangered (IUCN 3.1)

Scientific classification
- Kingdom: Plantae
- Clade: Tracheophytes
- Clade: Angiosperms
- Clade: Eudicots
- Clade: Rosids
- Order: Myrtales
- Family: Myrtaceae
- Genus: Eucalyptus
- Species: E. kitsoniana

Binomial name
- Eucalyptus kitsoniana Maiden

= Eucalyptus kitsoniana =

Gippsland mallee

Species of eucalyptus

Eucalyptus kitsoniana, commonly known as the Gippsland mallee or bog gum, is a species of small tree or mallee and is endemic to Victoria. It has mostly smooth bark, a crown containing juvenile, intermediate and adult leaves, flower buds in groups of seven, white flowers and sessile, cup-shaped to hemispherical fruit.

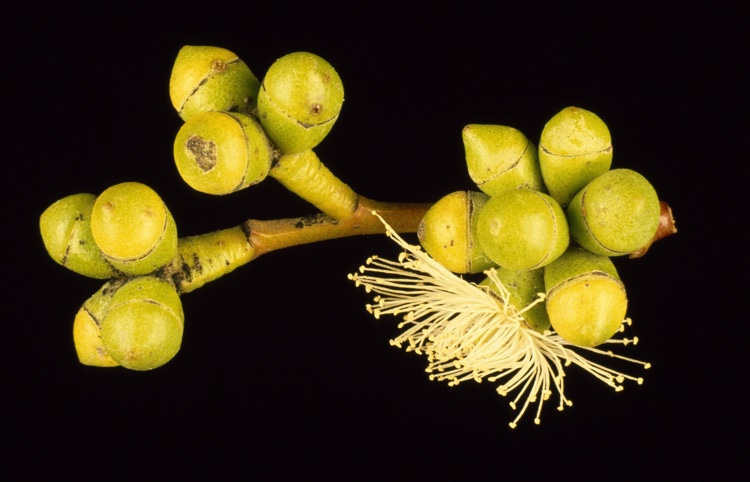
Flower buds

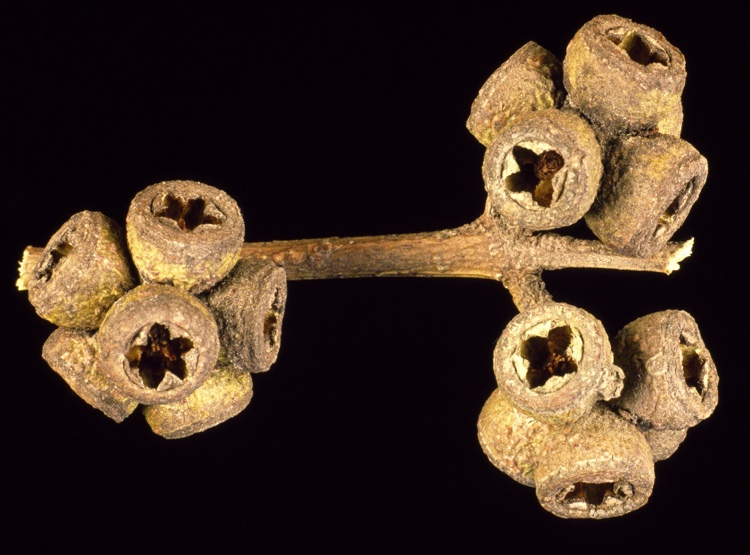
Fruit

== Description ==
Eucalyptus kitsoniana is a tree or mallee that typically grows to a height of 10 m (33 ft) and forms a lignotuber. It has smooth white to grey bark, sometimes with accumulated slabs of rough bark near the base and ribbons of shed bark above. The crown contains a mixture of juvenile, intermediate and adult leaves. Juvenile leaves are sessile, arranged in opposite pairs, a lighter shade of green on the lower side, broadly lance-shaped to more or less round, up to 100 mm (3.9 in) long and 80 mm (3.1 in) wide. Adult leaves are arranged alternately, the same glossy green on both sides, 75–180 mm (3.0–7.1 in) long and 15–35 mm (0.59–1.38 in) wide on a flattened petiole 10–15 mm (0.39–0.59 in) long. The flower buds are arranged in leaf axils in groups of seven on an unbranched peduncle 5–25 mm (0.20–0.98 in) long, the individual buds sessile and the groups surrounded by bracts when young. Mature buds are oval to oblong, 6–9 mm (0.24–0.35 in) long and 5–6 mm (0.20–0.24 in) wide with a conical to rounded operculum. Flowering occurs between August and March and the flowers are white. The fruit is a sessile, cup-shaped to hemispherical capsule, 4–9 mm (0.16–0.35 in) long and 7–11 mm (0.28–0.43 in) wide, the valves near rim level.

== Taxonomy and naming ==
Eucalyptus kitsoniana was first formally described in 1916 by Joseph Maiden and the description was published in his book A Critical Revision of the Genus Eucalyptus. The specific epithet honours the geologist Albert Ernest Kitson who was a keen naturalist.

== Distribution and habitat ==
The Gippsland mallee is endemic to Victoria and is found near watercourse inland and on coastal plains, often growing in small, pure stands. It mainly occurs between Yarram and Cape Otway, near Portland and on Wilsons Promontory.
