= Buchan Caves =

Caves in Victoria, Australia

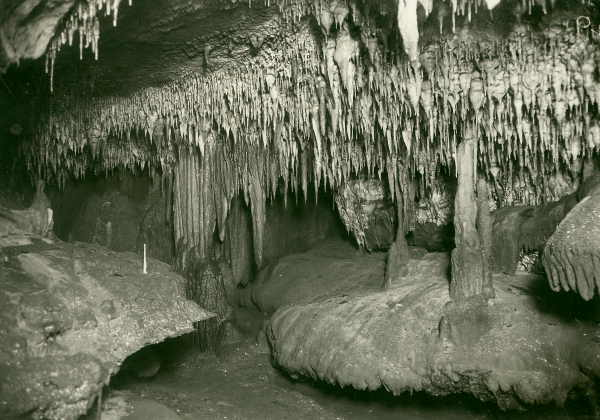
- Fairy Cave

- Location within Victoria
- Location: East Gippsland, Victoria, Australia
- Coordinates: 37°29′44.88″S 148°9′47.16″E
- Length: 3–4 kilometres (1.9–2.5 mi)
- Discovery: 1907 (European)
- Geology: Devonian Limestone
- Entrances: 6
- Show cave opened: Fairy Cave; 1907
- Show cave length: 400 metres (1,300 ft)
- Lighting: Electricity
- Website: Parks Victoria Buchan Caves website

The Buchan Caves are a group of limestone caves that include the Royal Cave and the Fairy Cave, located south-west of Buchan, in the East Gippsland region of the Australian state of Victoria. They have a total length of between 3 and 4 kilometres (1.9 and 2.5 mi), and six entrances.

The Buchan Cave Reserve has been transferred back to the Gunaikurnai Nation and is jointly managed with the state.

The limestone rock at Buchan, known as the Buchan Caves Limestone of the Buchan Group, was laid down during the Devonian period about 410–393 million years ago, during the Emsian stage. At the time, the sea covered this area of East Gippsland which was alive with shellfish and coral. Their remains were deposited in layers and over the years compacted to form limestone. The caves were formed by solution of the limestone.

The Buchan Caves are located approximately 360 kilometres (220 mi) east northeast (or six hours' drive) from Melbourne, along the Princes Highway, north of Lakes Entrance. Other caves nearby include Cloggs Cave and New Guinea II cave.

== Tourism ==
The caves are a major tourist attraction for Buchan and for East Gippsland. Daily tours are conducted in Royal Cave and Fairy Cave. Royal Cave features calcite-rimmed pools and in Fairy Cave features elaborate stalactites and stalagmites. Both caves are lit, have walkways and have a constant temperature of 17 °C (63 °F) making it a comfortable temperature all year round.

The Buchan Caves are situated within the Buchan Caves Reserve. There is access to short and long walks in the surrounding bushland and the nearby Snowy River National Park. The area is surrounded by trees and wildlife, including over 60 species of birds including bellbirds and lyrebirds. Amenities include campsites and cabins, picnic ground, playground and an information centre.

== History ==
=== Aboriginal history ===
The traditional and current custodians of the Buchan Caves and its surrounds are the Australian Aboriginal Gunaikurnai Nation.

=== European history ===
Buchan Caves were first identified and described for colonial settlers, when in 1840. Stewart Ryrie Jr, accompanied by an Aboriginal guide and three soldiers, came across caves, in the course of a survey of the area. He entered one of the caves, on 7 April 1840, possibly the one known as 'the Garage'. In January 1861, the Austrian-born artist Johann Joseph Eugen von Guerard, visited the caves and made a pencil sketch of the interior of a cave.

The caves were accidentally made a reserve in 1887, as they were on land set aside for stock camping. The government commissioned an exploration of the land and, on the recommendation of the geologist Albert Ernest Kitson, reserved the area to protect the caves (for geological and limited recreational use).

In 1907, Frank Moon reported back about the Fairy Cave which was then opened to the public later that year. Royal Cave was mapped in 1910 by Frederick Wilson and after an entrance tunnel was excavated, it was opened to visitors in 1913. The Caves Reserve was set out and planted mostly in the late 1930s.

The site is listed on the Victorian Heritage Register and is included a Heritage Overlay.

== See also ==
- Byaduk Caves
