= Buchan, Victoria =

Buchan
- Town
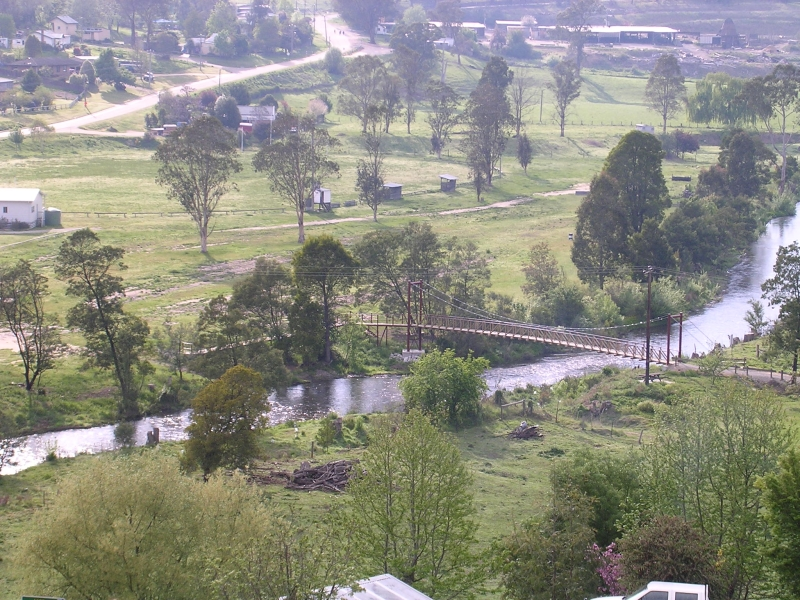
- Buchan landscape looking from township toward footbridge over the Buchan River and football ground

- Interactive map of Buchan
- Coordinates: 37°29′0″S 148°10′0″E
- Country: Australia
- State: Victoria
- LGA: Shire of East Gippsland
- Location: 356 km (221 mi) E of Melbourne; 76 km (47 mi) NE of Bairnsdale; 66 km (41 mi) NW of Orbost; 174 km (108 mi) S of Jindabyne

Government
  - State electorate: Gippsland East
  - Federal division: Gippsland
- Elevation: 95 m (312 ft)

Population
  - Total: 236 (2016 census)
- Postcode: 3885
Localities around Buchan
	Murrindal	W Tree
Buchan South and Reedy Flat	Buchan	Yalmy
Buchan South	Buchan South	Yalmy

Buchan (/bʌkən/ BUCK-ən) is a town in the East Gippsland region of Victoria, Australia. It is situated adjacent to the Buchan River, in the Shire of East Gippsland, upstream from the river's junction with the Snowy River. At the 2011 census, Buchan and the surrounding area had a population of 385. The town is best known for the limestone Buchan Caves.

== Buchan ==
Buchan is a rural town, consisting largely of farmland and native vegetation. It is surrounded by the localities of Black Mountain, Buchan South, Butchers Ridge, Canni Creek, Gelantipy, Gillingall, Glenmore, Murrindal, Suggan Buggan, Timbarra, W-Tree, and Wulgulmerang. Buchan is the main town and is located on the Buchan River, approximately 75 kilometres from Bairnsdale and 350 kilometres from Melbourne.

While Buchan is best known for its caves, its history as one of the oldest townships in Victoria goes back further than the discovery of the caves. It also has fossils that depict the mega fauna that existed in the region 20,000 years ago. Some fossils are in view on the new Buchan Hotel stone walls. The township celebrated its 175th anniversary in March 2014.

== History ==
European settlement first entered the area in October 1838 and Buchan station was established in January 1839. Free selection after 1868, and a township was proclaimed in 1873 taking its name from the station. The Buchan Post Office opened around October 1878 and at Buchan South in 1901 (closed 1980). It is thought that the name Buchan was taken from an Aboriginal word Bukkan-mungie to which various meanings have been ascribed, one interpretation of its meaning is place of grass bag and another is a 'place of rocks with holes in them'; however, it is more likely to be named after Buchan, Scotland, given how many of Australia's locations are named after places in the United Kingdom.

Farming included cattle, sheep and crops. Wheat, oats, barley, maize, hops, arrowroot and beans were grown on the river flats at various times. Dairying operations, initially for local consumption, commenced prior to the turn of the century. This expanded into several cheese factories and a butter factory which operated for many years. Sheep and cattle grazing increased as settlement spread and cattle sales began in Buchan in 1901. The township grew as closer settlement of the farming land meant more demand for services.

A number of mines were opened as early as 1869 including silver, gold and lead. Some of the bigger mines were profitable but most were short-lived. Some commercial quarries operated in the early 1900s and marble from the quarries was used to build the Shrine and State Library in Melbourne and buildings in London and throughout the state. From the 1950s a quarry also produced crushed lime for agriculture, paper manufacture and other uses. Wattle bark stripping was an important industry and small spot mills worked in the surrounding bush. Following World War 2, two large sawmills and several smaller mills operated in Buchan providing employment. The last mill ceased operation this year. There were small groups of Aboriginal people in the area but their numbers declined following European settlement. At Cloggs Cave near Buchan, evidence has been found of Aboriginal occupation in prehistoric times.

The Buchan Caves were surveyed in 1889, although their existence was well known in the 1880s. Fairy Cave was discovered in 1907 by the local caretaker, Frank Moon, and was opened for public inspection in 1908. Royal Cave was opened in 1912 and by 1917 six caves were open to the public. In the 1920s camping facilities were developed near the caves to accommodate the number of tourists who visited the area on bus tours and who stayed in the local guesthouses, hotels or at the new campsite. The caves were closed during the war but reopened in 1946. Residents in the district have experienced a number of environmental hardships over the last decade, including drought, two floods and three major fires. The fires in particular have impacted heavily on the farming, timber and tourism industries.

== Sport ==
Buchan has a picnic horse racing club, the Buchan & Gelantipy Race Club, which holds its one race meeting a year with the Canni Creek Cup in February. A rodeo is held at Easter, and the Flowers & Craft Show in November.

Golfers play at the Buchan Valley Golf Club. The town has an Australian Rules football team known as the Cavemen, who compete in the Omeo & District Football League. They won the premiership in 1983, 1987, 1998, 2004 and 2005.
