= Bidhawal =

Australian Aboriginal tribe

The Bidawal (also known as Bidhawal and Bidwell) were an Australian Aboriginal tribe of Gippsland, Victoria. According to Alfred William Howitt, the Bidawal were composed of "refugees from tribes".

== Country ==
Bidawal land, basically tough sclerophyll woodlands and rainforest, extended over 7,000 square kilometres (2,700 sq mi), straddling the present borders of New South Wales and Victoria, from Green Cape, N.S.W., and Cape Everard, now Point Hicks. Inland to the west, it reached the area of Delegate and the headwaters of Cann and Bern rivers. Alfred William Howitt, in traversing its terrain, wrote as follows:

This tract is one of the most inhospitable that I have seen in Australia. I have traversed its scrubs, mountains and swamps fo(u)r several times, and I observed little in it of living creatures excepting a few wallaby, snakes, leeches, mosquitoes and flies. Yet the Bidweli inhabited the few small open tracts in it.'

== Initiation ceremony ==
The rites used by the Bidawal to negotiate the initiatory passage of young men into full adult status were described by R. H. Mathews. Among the Bidawal, this common rite was called the Dyerrayal. Given the relative scarcity of food resources to sustain incomers, the gathering Bidawal conducted their variation of the ceremony rapidly. (Note: 'Die Zeit, welche die Initiationszeremonien der Birdhawal-Stämme beanspruchten, war in den möglichst engen Grenzen gehalten. … Die Notwendigkeit jeder billigen Beschleunigung erscheint natürlich, wenn man bedenkt, daß das Leben aller australischen Eingeborenen ein ununterbrochener Kampf um die Existenz ist, und daher ist der besondere Bedarf an Wild und vegetabilischen Produkten infolge der ‘Invasion’ der zu Gast weilenden Stämme eine sehr ernste und wichtige Sache.' Recently retranslated as follows: 'The time occupied in connection with the initiation ceremony of the Birdhawal tribes was kept within the shortest possible limits. … The necessity for all reasonable expedition is obvious when we remember that the life of all Australian aboriginals is one continual struggle for existence, and hence the extra demand on the game and vegetable products due to the ‘invasion’ of the visiting tribes is quite a serious and momentous matter.')

The hosting Bidawal would prepare the ceremonial ground while messengers alerted distant tribes to present themselves for the occasion. On their arrival, the presiding elders would call out the prominent landscape features of each tribe as they settled variously on grounds cleared for their respective camps. The initiated men would then conduct a wurradhang (closed consultative assembly) to arrange the details of the forthcoming ceremony, the preceptors (bulluwrung) for the novices and the men who would orchestrate proceedings, collectively known as the kuringal.

At around midday, the boys would begin to be decked out by their mothers and sisters with the body paint and feathered headdress proper to each tribe's customs, and, by late afternoon, would be led to sit on bark or leave-green boughs, heads bent down, in a cleared space some distance from the ceremonial ground proper, each mother marking the spot with her yamstick, as songs were droned. At this stage they were now called dhurtungurrin.

The men, likewise dressed out now arrive, at a trot, in single file, while beating the ground a piece of bark, and, forming a curved row before the novices, start a rhythmic beating of the ground in a wave from end to end and back. After this, the boys return with their mothers to their respective women's camps (burrikin).

The day after, a body of men trail out to a site some 300–400 metres away, clear it and strew the ground of the resulting horseshoe arena with foliage. Towards sunset, the boys and women, at some distance, stand in the beating ground they occupied the day before, as the warriors return, armed with twigs or switches stripped of their leaves (deddelun), and, having distributed a portion of the deddelun to women nearby, encircle the boys, and toss the twigs and shorn boughs, with the women, over the boys' heads. The lads are then raised on men's shoulders, and breath in and out deeply as they sway, which earns them a congratulatory shout. Thereupon, they are led to the horseshoe enclosure, with women bringing with them the deddelun material. There the boys are obliged to lie on the leaf beds, and, covered over with foliage, told to remain motionless and speechless. If they feel the call of nature, they must do it without moving. Fires are lit near their feet to keep them warm. Throughout the night, the women, followed by the men, circle round the enclosure singing a tune no one can understand, while beating the deddelun, the purpose being to lull the boys into a drowsy sleep.

Just after daybreak a turndun (bullroarer is heard, a signal for the women to leave and set up a new camp somewhere distantly. The elders and medicine men then get the boys to sit upright, and they are adorned with the tribal regalia of manhood, brow-band, a girdle round the waist, an apron and the like, while their heads were covered with an animal skin to stop them from seeing anything. Each bulluwrung then takes charge of his boy, and the leafy site is set on fire, until all, including the deddelun, is burnt off. The novices are then led off to a camp distant several miles away, where they must again observe silence, with heads bowed. Once separated from the women, they are given detailed knowledge of edible and taboo foods, but additional knowledge about plants is also provided by the womenfolk when they return to that company During the following days the men hunt, sometimes bringing the initiands with them, and allowing them to partake of choice morsels. Of an evening, theatrical scenarios mimicking acts like hunting for wombats or scaring possums out of trees take place.

On the afternoon of the final day, the boys are made to sit, still with their head coverings, while a set of kuringal, their bodies greased and covered with charcoal stand off, with grotesque headwear, 20 paces in front of the boys, and a bullroarer is swung. Each is then approached by an elder, rubbed with the bullroarer, and told, always by a man from a different tribe than his own, never to reveal the secrets he has observed, on pain of death. The boys are then led to the women's camp to endure an ordeal by smoke. The following day, the tribes dispersed, each taking a graduate of the ceremony from a neighbouring tribe, who then undergoes scarification and taught further traditions.

== History ==
The Bidawal may have been an aggregation of Aboriginals from several tribes, each seeking refuge in this harsh piece of territory from tribal justice. Howitt, who raised this hypothesis, suggested that their land functioned like the Cave of Adullam in the Old Testament as a haven for persecuted fugitives. (Note: 'I can feel no doubt that the Biduelli country was an Australian "cave of Adullam"; that the tribe was built up by refugees from tribal justice, or individual vengeance, and that they organised themselves, as far as they could do so.')

== Alternative names ==
The name 'Bidawal' means 'scrub dwellers' in the languages of neighbouring peoples.

- Birdhawal, Birtowall, Bidwell, Bidwill, Bidwelli, Biduelli, Beddiwell
- Maap (ma:p means "man")
- Muk-dhang (mak means "good"+ ðan, speech)
- Kwai-dhang (Krauatungalung exonym, bearing the sense of "rough speech")

== Sources ==
- Barwick, Diane E. (1984). McBryde, Isabel (ed.). "Mapping the past: an atlas of Victorian clans 1835-1904". Aboriginal History. 8 (2): 100–131. JSTOR 24045800.
- Dixon, R. M. W. (2002). Australian Languages: Their Nature and Development. Cambridge University Press. ISBN 978-0-521-47378-1.
- Howitt, A. W. (1886). "On the Migrations of the Kurnai Ancestors". The Journal of the Anthropological Institute of Great Britain and Ireland. 15: 419–420.
- Howitt, A. W. (2010) [First published 1904]. The Native Tribes of South-East Australia. Cambridge University Press. pp. 79–81. ISBN 9781108006323.
- Mathews, R. H. (October–December 1907). "Language of the Birdhawal Tribe, in Gippsland, Victoria". Proceedings of the American Philosophical Society. 46 (187): 346–359. JSTOR 983474.
- Mathews, R. H. (1908). "Initiationszeremonie des Birdhawal-Stammes (Initiation Ceremony of the Birdhawal Tribe)". Mitteilungen der Anthropologischen Gesellschaft. 38: 17–24.
- Tindale, Norman Barnett (1974). "Bidawal (VIC)". Aboriginal Tribes of Australia: Their Terrain, Environmental Controls, Distribution, Limits, and Proper Names. Australian National University Press. ISBN 978-0-708-10741-6.
