= Islet =

Very small island

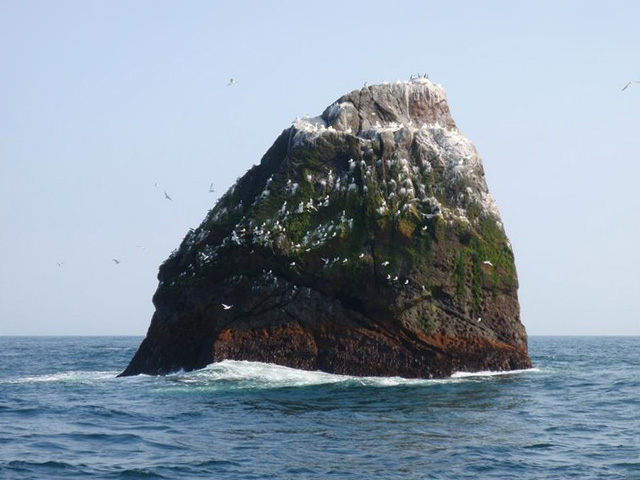
Rockall, an islet located west of Ireland and Scotland

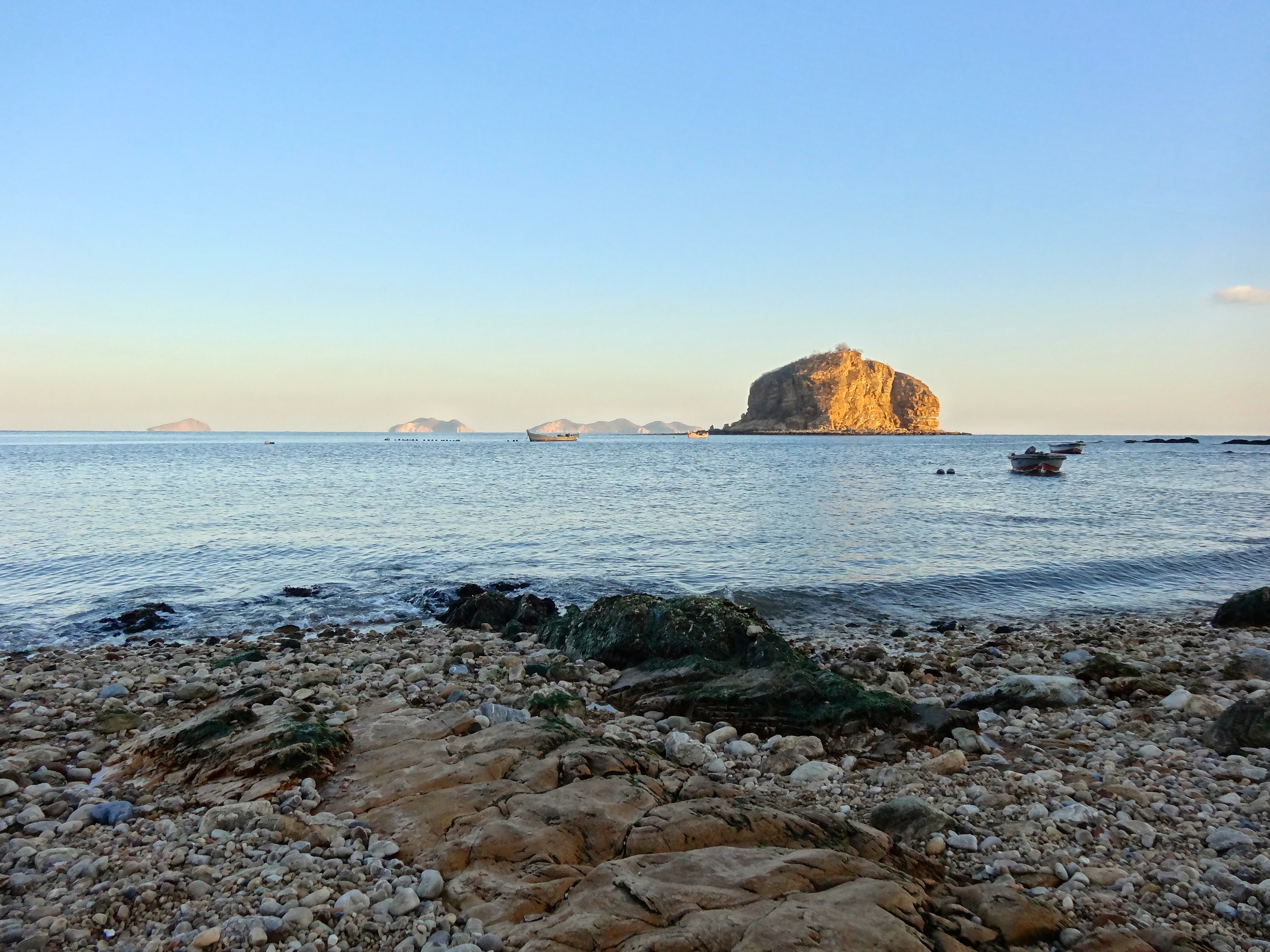
Bàngchuí Island in Dalian, Liaoning, China, is a typical rock islet

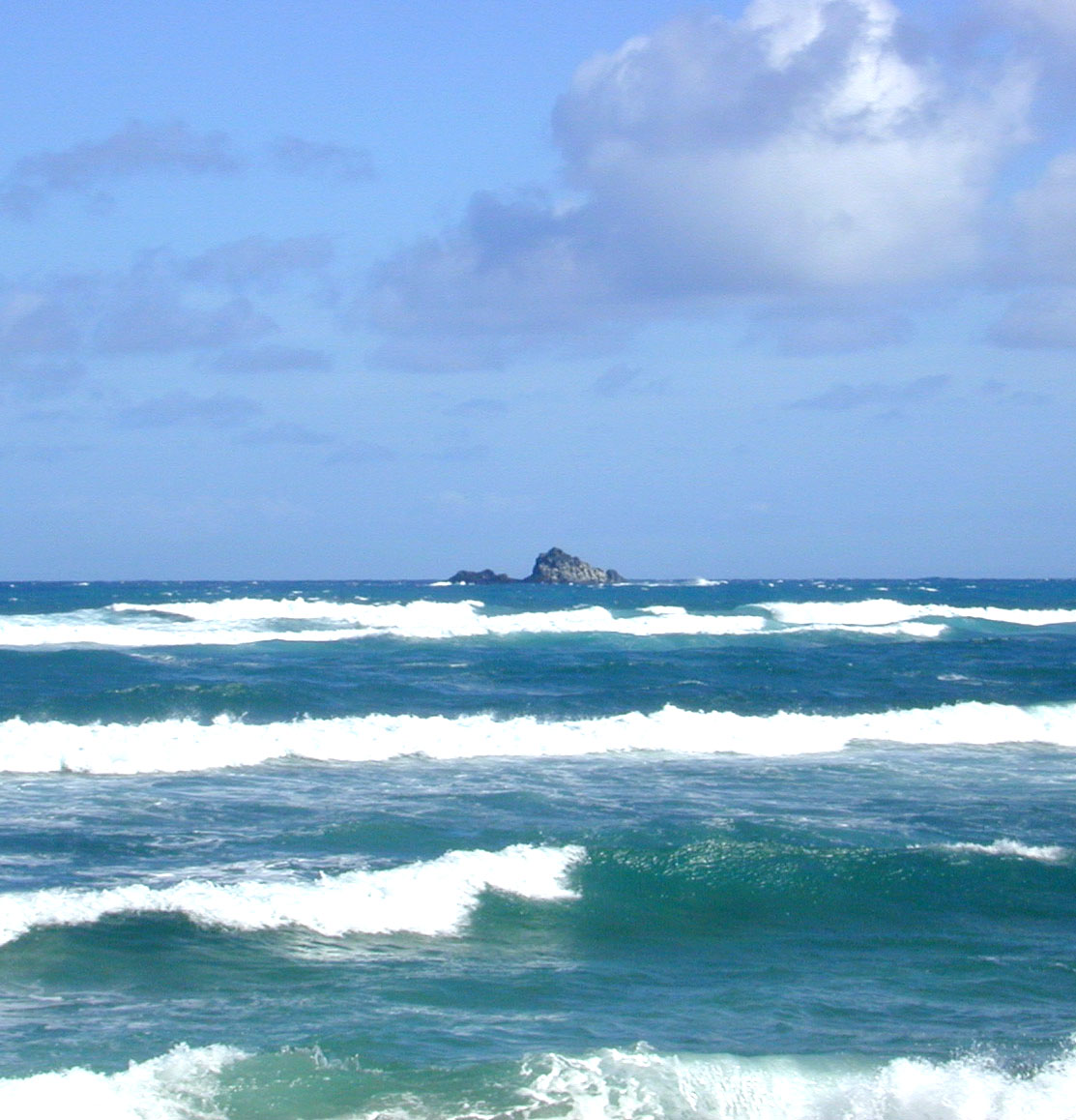
Mōkōlea Rock in Kailua Bay, O‘ahu, 2.2 kilometres (1.4 mi) off North Beach, Marine Corps Base Hawaii

An islet (/ˈaɪ.lət/, EYE-lət) is generally a small island. Definitions vary and are not precise, but some suggest that an islet is a very small, often unnamed, island with little or no vegetation and unable to support human habitation. It may be made of rock, sand or hard coral; may be permanent or tidal (i.e. surfaced reef or seamount); and may exist in the sea, lakes, rivers, or any other sizeable bodies of water.

== Definition ==
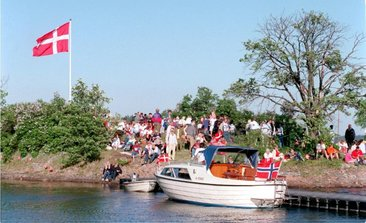
Danes on the islet Danmark in Norway. It is a typical Nordic skerry.

As suggested by its origin islette, an Old French diminutive of "isle", use of the term implies small size, but little attention is given to drawing an upper limit on its applicability.

The World Landforms website says, "An islet landform is generally considered to be a rock or small island that has little vegetation and cannot sustain human habitation", and further that size may vary from a few square feet to several square miles, with no specific rule pertaining to size.

== Other terms ==
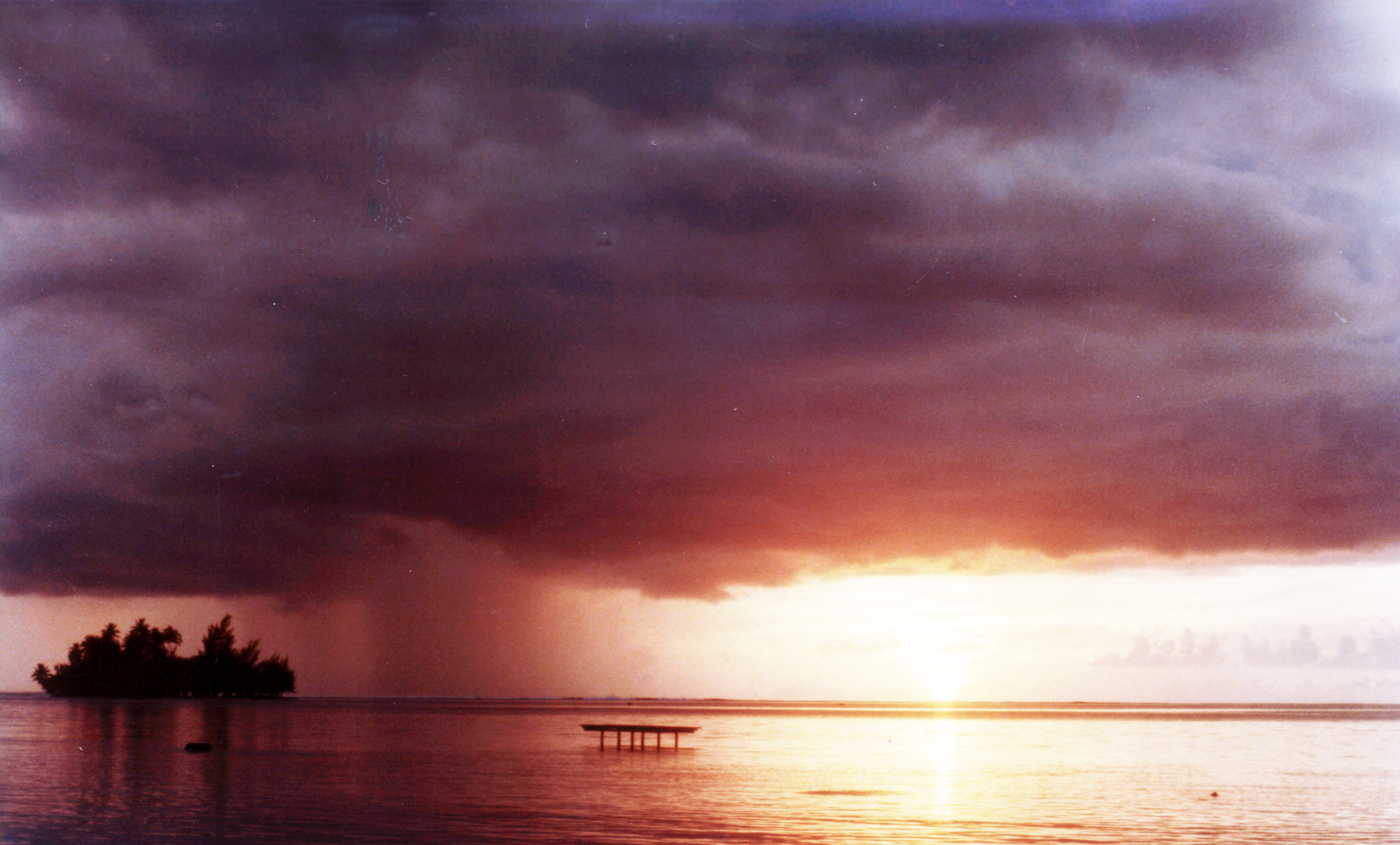
A Tahitian motu off the island of Raiatea at sunset

- Ait (/eɪt/, like eight) or eyot (/aɪ(ə)t, eɪt/), a small island. It is especially used to refer to river islands found on the River Thames and its tributaries in England.
- Cay or key, an islet formed by the accumulation of fine sand deposits atop a reef, especially in the Caribbean and West Atlantic. Rum Cay in the Bahamas and the Florida Keys off Florida are examples of islets.
- The French suffix -hou from the Scandinavian -holm, is used for the names of some islets in the Channel Islands, such as Écréhous, Burhou, Lihou and Les Houmets, and off Normandy, such as Tatihou.
- Inch, a term used especially in Scotland, from the Gaelic innis, which originally meant island, but has been supplanted to refer to smaller islands, such as the islet of Inch, off St Mary's Isle Priory, Inch Kenneth, Inchkeith, Keith Inch (no longer an island) and Inchcailloch.
- Motu, a reef islet formed by broken coral and sand, surrounding an atoll, especially in Polynesia, such as Motu One, Motu Nao and Motu Paahi.
- River island, an islet within the current of a river, such as the Île de la Cité in Paris.
- Rock, in the sense of a type of islet, is an uninhabited landform composed of exposed rocks, lying offshore, and having at most minimal vegetation, such as Albino Rock in the Palm Island group off Queensland, Australia.
- Sandbar or shoal, an exposed sandbar.
- Sea stack, a thin, vertical landform jutting out of a body of water.
- Skerry, a small rocky island, usually defined to be too small for habitation, especially in Ireland.
- Subsidiary islets, a more technical application, is applied to small land features isolated by water, lying off the shore of a larger island. Similarly, any emergent land in an atoll is also called an islet.
- Tidal island, small islands (not always islets) which lie closely off the coast of a mainland or a much larger island, being connected to it (and thus becomes a peninsula/promontory) in low tide and isolated by a channel in high tide.

== In international law ==
Islets involved in ICJ cases

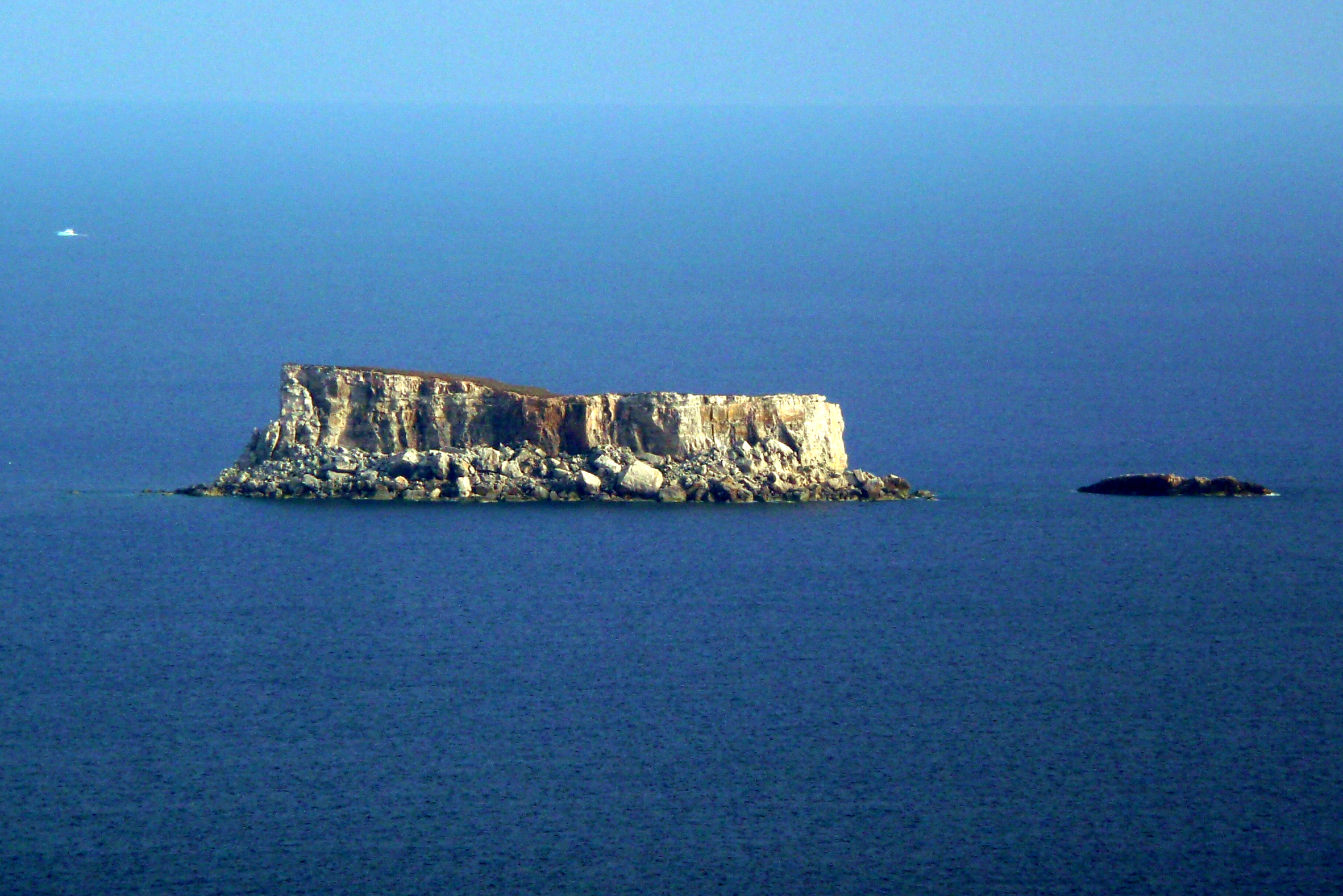
Filfla (1985)

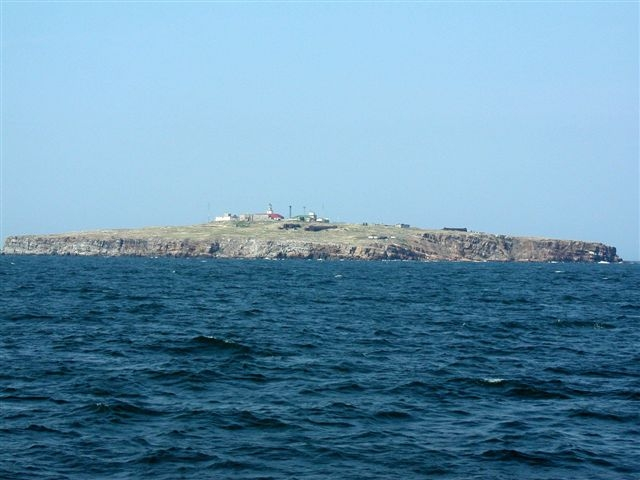
Snake Island (2009)

Whether an islet is considered a rock or not, it can have significant economic consequences under Article 121 of the UN Convention on the Law of the Sea, which stipulates that "rocks which cannot sustain human habitation or economic life of their own shall have no exclusive economic zone or continental shelf". One long-term dispute over the status of such an islet was that of Snake Island.

The International Court of Justice jurisprudence however sometimes ignores islets, regardless of inhabitation status, in deciding territorial disputes; it did so in 2009 in adjudicating the Romania–Ukraine dispute, and previously in the dispute between Libya and Malta involving the islet of Filfla.

== List of islets ==
There are thousands of islets on Earth: approximately 24,000 islands and islets in the Stockholm archipelago alone. The following is a list of example islets from around the world.

- Águila Islet, the southernmost point of the Americas
- Aplin Islet (Queensland)
- Apia
- Auster Lake Islet
- Ball's Pyramid, South Pacific
- Bay Islet or See Chau, Hong Kong
- Benggala Island, Indonesia
- Bikirrin, in Majuro, Marshall Islands
- Black Rock, South Atlantic
- Boundary Islet, Australia
- Bogskär, Finland
- Briggs Islet, southeastern Australia
- Bushy Islet (Queensland)
- Capitancillo Islet, in Bogo City, Cebu, Philippines
- Chão, in the Madeira Islands, Portugal
- Cholmondeley Islet (Queensland)
- Clubes Island, Brasília, Brazil
- Columbretes Islands, Spain
- Cone Islet, southeastern Australia
- Douglas Islet (Queensland)
- Dry Tortugas, Florida Keys, USA
- Dugay Islet, southeastern Australia
- Edwards Islet, southeastern Australia
- Enekalamur in Majuro, Marshall Islands
- Enemanit in Majuro, Marshall Islands
- Fairway Rock, Bering Strait
- Fastnet Rock, Ireland
- Filfla, southern Malta
- Formigas, in the Azores islands
- Gáshólmur, Faroe Islands
- Granite Island (South Australia), Victor Harbor, South Australia.
- Galatasaray Islet, Istanbul, Turkey
- Halfway Islet, Queensland, Australia
- Herald Island, Arctic Ocean
- Île Vierge, France
- Isles of Scilly, United Kingdom
- Kid Island, Lake of the Ozarks, Missouri United States
- Islets of Caroline Island, in Kiribati
- Islets of Mauritius
- Isla de Alborán, Spain, Western Mediterranean
- Jardine Islet (Queensland)
- Jethou, Bailiwick of Guernsey
- Keelung Islet, off the northern shore of Taiwan
- Klein Bonaire, Netherlands
- Kolbeinsey, Iceland
- Liancourt Rocks, South Korea
- Lihou, Bailiwick of Guernsey
- Magra Islet (Queensland)
- Mañagaha, Saipan
- Martin Islet (New South Wales)
- Mid Woody Islet, southeastern Australia
- Milman Islet (Queensland)
- Monchique Islet, Europe's westernmost point, in the Azores, Portugal
- Nā Mokulua, Oʻahu, Hawaii, United States
- Noorderhaaks, off the coast of the Netherlands
- Oodaaq, Greenland
- Pula Ulor, Beserah, Kuantan District, Pahang, Malaysia
- Parece Vela, West Pacific
- Perejil Island, Strait of Gibraltar
- Penguin Islet (Tasmania)
- Pigeon Island, Sri Lanka
- Pokonji Dol, Croatia
- Velika Sestrica, Croatia
- Rockall, North Atlantic
- Saint Peter and Saint Paul rocks, equatorial Atlantic
- Salas y Gómez, Northeast from Easter Island
- San Juan Islet, Puerto Rico
- Saunders Islet (Queensland)
- Seacrow Islet, southeastern Australia
- Shag Rocks, South Atlantic
- Silver Islet, Ontario
- Sinclair Islet (Queensland)
- Skull Islet, in British Columbia, Canada
- Star Keys/Motuhope, New Zealand
- Saltholm, small Islet in Oresund west of Copenhagen
- Sue Islet (Queensland)
- Sumbiarholmur, Faroe Islands
- Sunday Islet (Queensland)
- Taprobane Island, Sri Lanka
- Thomson Islet (Queensland)
- Tindhólmur, Faroe Islands
- Vilkitsky Island, Arctic Ocean
- Wallace Islet (Queensland)
- Wachusett Reef, Ernest Legouve Reef, and Maria Theresa Reef, South Pacific Ocean
- Westward Islet, in the Pitcairn Islands
- Ynys Lawd, Wales
