= Beesley Island =

Island in Queensland, Australia

Coordinates: 12°14′28″S 143°12′00″E

Beesley Island is an island in the Piper Islands National Park in the Great Barrier Reef Marine Park, Queensland, Australia. It is located in Temple Bay about 100 km northeast of Kutini-Payamu National Park and Lockhart River and 50 km south of Cape Grenville. The island, along with neighbouring Baird, Farmer and Fisher Islands, constitutes the Piper Islands Important Bird Area, so identified by BirdLife International because of its importance as a breeding site for pied imperial pigeons and black noddies.

It rises 20 feet above sea level.
