= Fisher Island (Queensland) =

Island in Australia

- Interactive map of Fisher Island

Geography
- Location: Northern Australia
- Coordinates: 12.258°S 143.235°E

Administration
- Australia
- State: Queensland

Fisher Island is an island in the Piper Islands National Park in the Great Barrier Reef Marine Park, Queensland, Australia. It is located in Temple Bay about 100 km northeast of Kutini-Payamu National Park and Lockhart River and 50 km south of Cape Grenville. The island, along with neighbouring Baird, Beesley and Farmer Islands, constitutes the Piper Islands Important Bird Area, so identified by BirdLife International because of its importance as a breeding site for pied imperial pigeons and black noddies.
