= Baird Island =

Island of Queensland, Australia

Coordinates: 12°14′31″S 143°12′43″E

Baird Island is an island in the Piper Islands National Park in the Great Barrier Reef Marine Park Queensland, Australia, in Temple Bay about 100 km northeast of Kutini-Payamu National Park and Lockhart River and 50 km south of Cape Grenville. The island, along with neighbouring Beesley, Farmer and Fisher Islands, constitutes the Piper Islands Important Bird Area, so identified by BirdLife International because of its importance as a breeding site for pied imperial pigeons and black noddies.

It occupies an area of about 2 hectares.
