= Hicks Island =

Island in Queensland, Australia

- Interactive map of Hicks Island

Geography
- Location: Northern Australia
- Coordinates: 11.983°S 143.269°E
- Area: 1.6 km^{2} (0.62 sq mi)

Administration
- Australia
- State: Queensland

Hicks Island is an island about 1 km southeast of Cape Grenville in the Great Barrier Reef Marine Park Queensland, Australia, in Temple Bay about 200 km northeast of Kutini-Payamu National Park and Lockhart River in the Cape York Peninsula. It is around 160 hectares (395.4 acres) in size. This island is part of the Home Islands group.

== Birdlife ==
Hicks Island is part of the Cape York to Cape Grenville Islands Important Bird Area. The island is inhabited by species such as the pied imperial-pigeon, bridled tern, roseate tern and lesser crested tern.

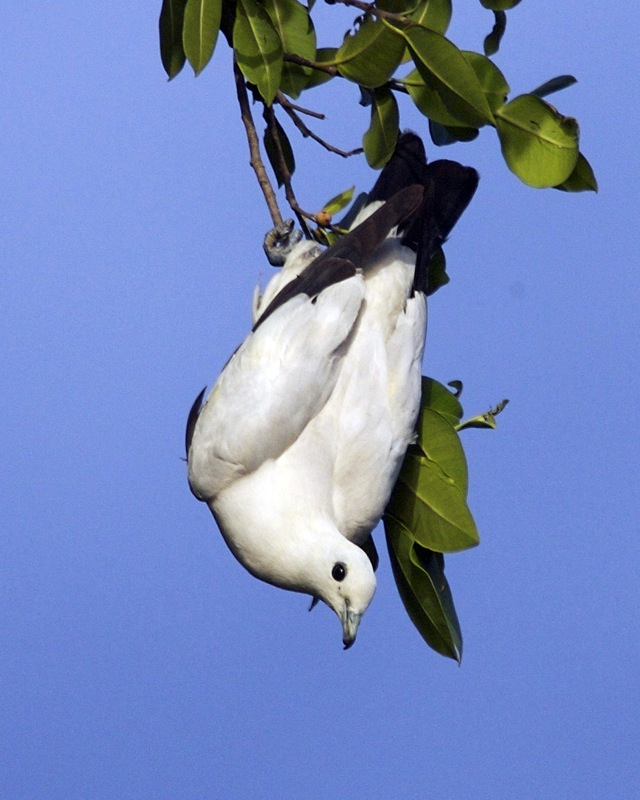
A pied imperial-pigeon

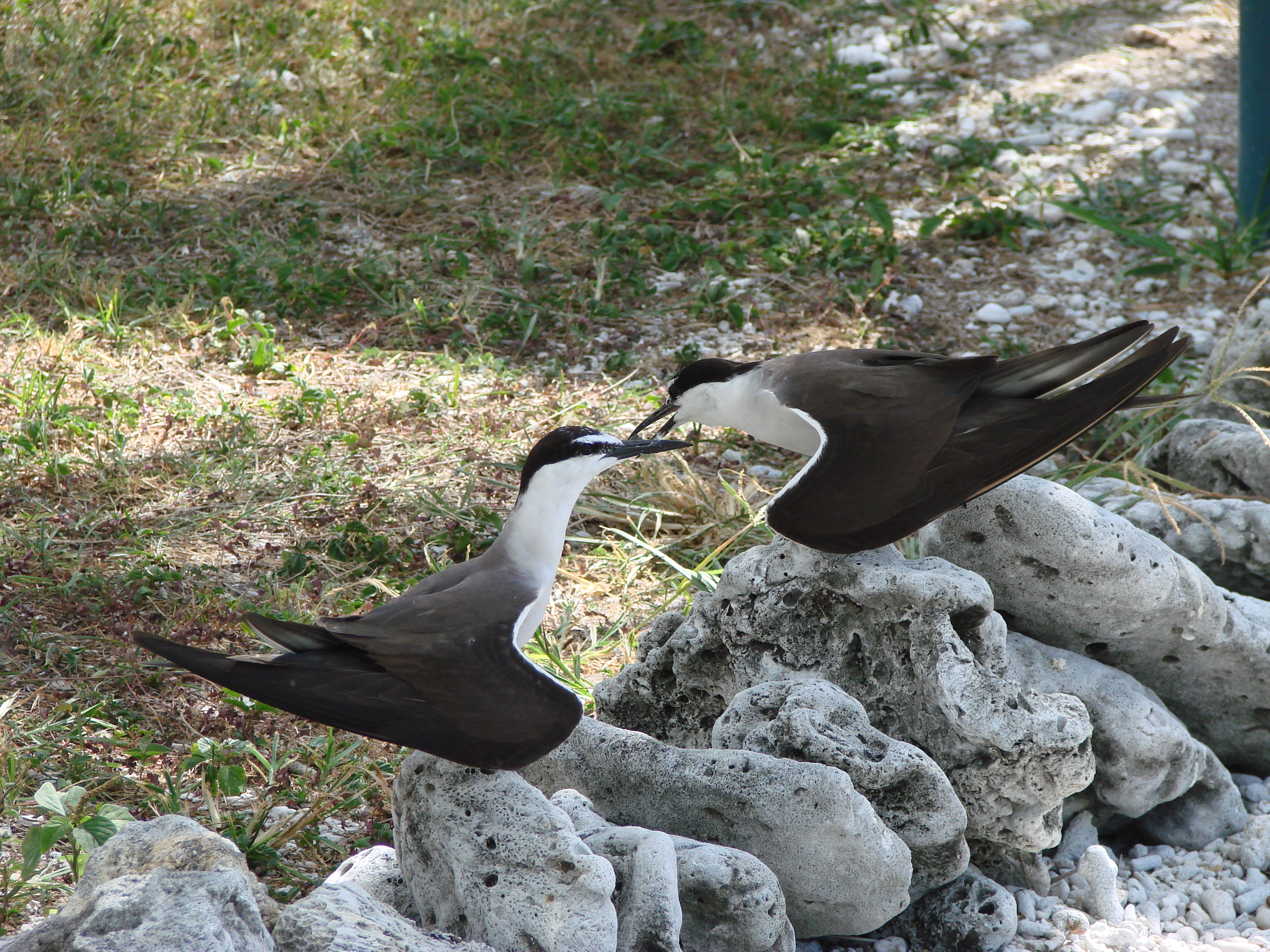
A bridled tern pair

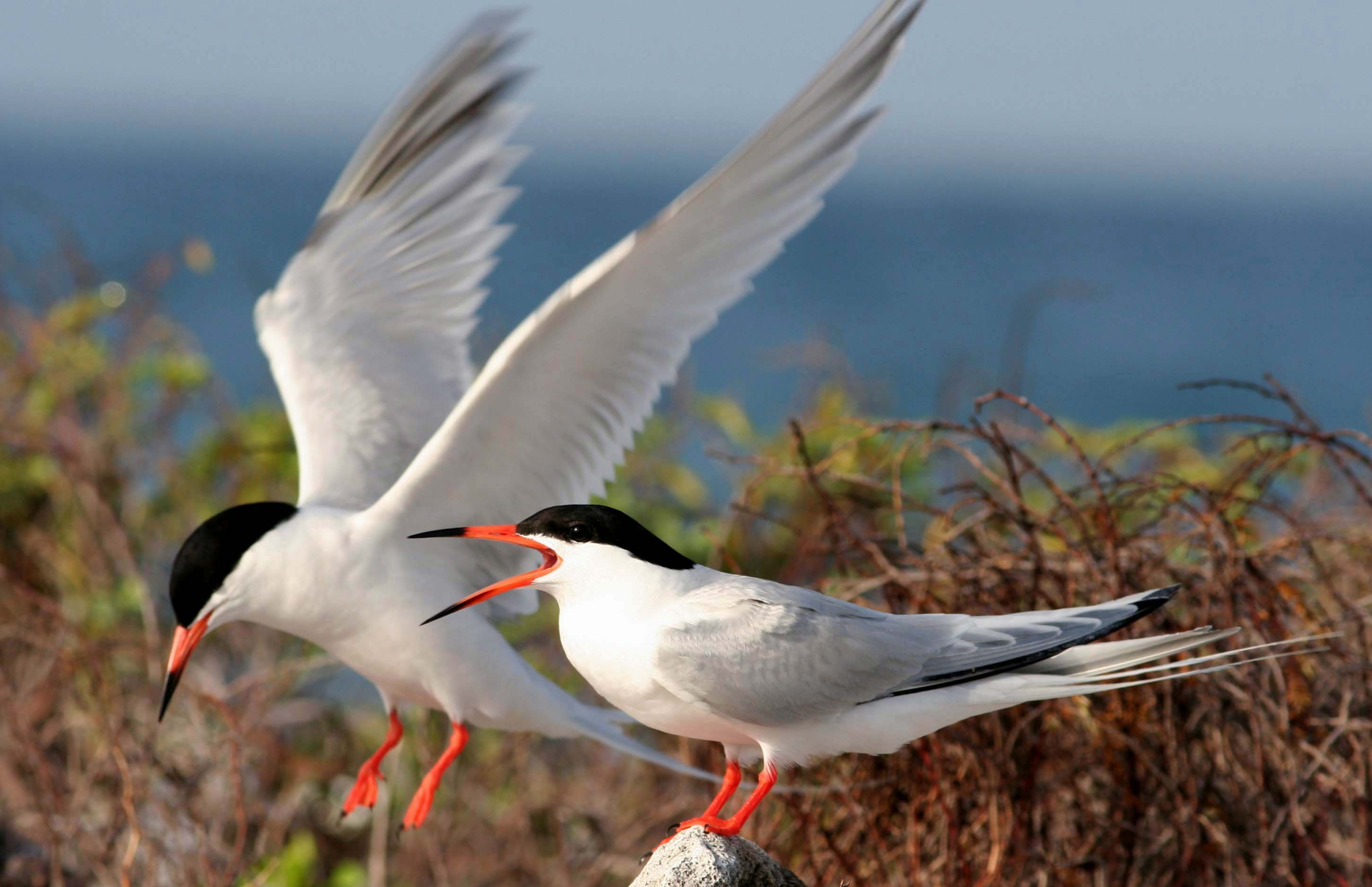
A roseate tern pair
