= Gore Island (Queensland) =

Island in Queensland

Coordinates: 11°59′24″S 143°14′56″E

Gore Island is an island about 1 km southeast of Cape Grenville in the Great Barrier Reef Marine Park Queensland, Australia, in Temple Bay about 200 km northeast of Kutini-Payamu National Park and Lockhart River in the Cape York Peninsula. This island is part of Home Islands. It is also part of the Cape York to Cape Grenville Islands Important Bird Area.

The Gore Island occupies an area of about 53 hectares.
