= Hog Island =

Hog Island may refer to:

== Australia ==
- Hog Island (Tasmania)

== Bahamas ==
- Former name of Paradise Island

== Canada ==
- Hog Island (North Channel) in the North Channel
- Hog Island (Ottawa River) in the Ottawa River
- Hog Island (Prince Edward Island), located off the northwest coast of Prince Edward Island

== Falkland Islands ==
- Hog Island, Falkland Islands

== Grenada ==
- Hog Island (Grenada)

== Guyana ==
- Hogg Island, Guyana

== Honduras ==
- Cayos Cochinos, are sometimes referred to in English as the Hog Islands

== Indonesia ==
- Simeulue, historically known to European mariners as Hog Island

== United States ==
- Hog Island (Aleutian Islands), Alaska
- Hog Island (Kodiak Archipelago), Alaska
- Hog Island (Petaluma River), California
- Hog Island (Tomales Bay), California
- Hog Island (San Joaquin County), California
- Honeymoon Island, in Florida along the Gulf Coast formerly known as Hog Island
- Appledore Island, Maine, formerly known as Hog Island
- Hog Island (Lincoln County, Maine), off Bremen
- Hog Island (Calvert County), Chesapeake Bay, an island of Maryland
- Hog Island (Dorchester County), an island of Maryland
- Hog Island (Prospect Bay), an island of Maryland
- Hog Island (Worcester County, Maryland), an island of Maryland
- Spinnaker Island (Massachusetts), formerly known as Hog Island
- Hog Island (Michigan)
- Hog Island (Mohawk River), island in New York state also known as Isle of the Cayugas
- Hog Island (New York), two islands by this name near the Rockaways
  - Translation of the Dutch name Varkens Eylandt, an old name for Roosevelt Island
- Hog Island (Oregon)
- Hog Island, Philadelphia
- Hog Island (Rhode Island)
- Hog Island (Machipongo, Virginia), barrier island in Northumberland County, Virginia
- Hog Island (Potomac), an island of the Potomac River
- Hog Island Wildlife Management Area, peninsula into James River near Jamestown now in Surry and Isle of Wight Counties
- Hog Island (Wisconsin)

== See also ==
- Hog Islander
- Hog Island sheep, a breed of sheep descended from animals first brought to Virginia's Hog Island in the 18th century
- Pig Island (disambiguation)
