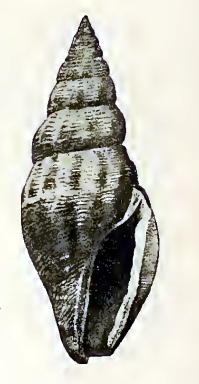
- Shell of Inquisitor glauce

Scientific classification
- Kingdom: Animalia
- Phylum: Mollusca
- Class: Gastropoda
- Subclass: Caenogastropoda
- Order: Neogastropoda
- Superfamily: Conoidea
- Family: Pseudomelatomidae
- Genus: Inquisitor
- Species: I. glauce

Binomial name
- Inquisitor glauce (Dall, 1918)

Synonyms
- Drillia ventricosa Hedley, 1908; Inquisitor (Drillia) ventricosa Smith, 1888; Pleurotoma glauce Dall, 1918

= Inquisitor glauce =

Species of gastropod

Inquisitor glauce is a species of predatory sea snail, a marine gastropod mollusk in the family Pseudomelatomidae. It was first documented by E. A. Smith in 1888. I. glauce is not a broadcast spawner, meaning it does not release unfertilized eggs into the water. Unlike many gastropods, the trochophore stage is not present in the life cycle of these predatory sea snails, meaning it is not found as a veliger. Very little is known about its diet or habits due to its small size and residence in benthic depths.

== Taxonomy ==
First documented in 1888 by E. A. Smith, it was given the name Pleurotoma (Drillia) ventricosa. However, this name was not accepted taxonomically as it was a junior homonym of Pleurotoma ventricosa (Lamarck, 1804), another species of sea snail. Pleurotoma glauce was its replacement name, and in 1918, it was given the modern name Inquisitor glauce.

== Description ==
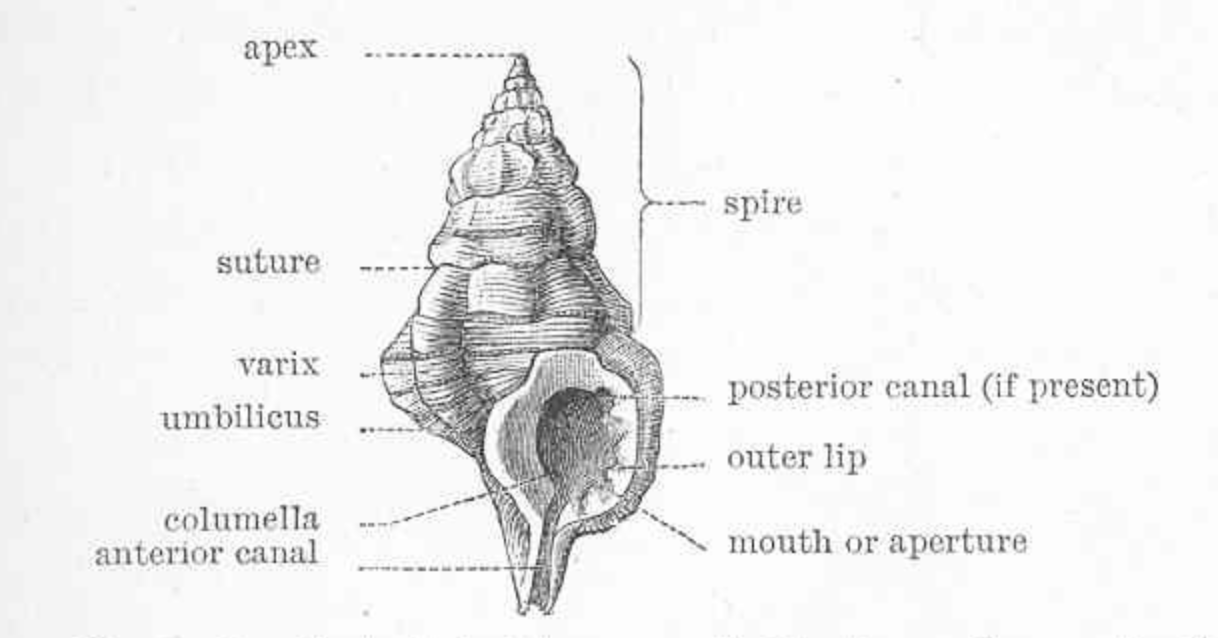
Diagram of some of the technical terms of anatomy of a mollusc shell

The shell grows to a length of 27.5 mm; its diameter 9.5 mm.

The overall shape of the shell is oval and spirally closely lined. The general colouration of this shell is reddish testaceous and is slightly washed with white. The white lines in the middle of the whorls is more distinct than the others. The aperture is red-brown and long, equal to about ½ of the total length. It is truncated at the base. The anterior canal is short and oblique. The columella is straight, lined with a thin callous. The callous thickens towards the top.

The radula of I. glauce is composed of two or three teeth in a row with curved and solid marginal teeth. All species in Pseudomelatomidae share a similar radula structure.

== Distribution ==
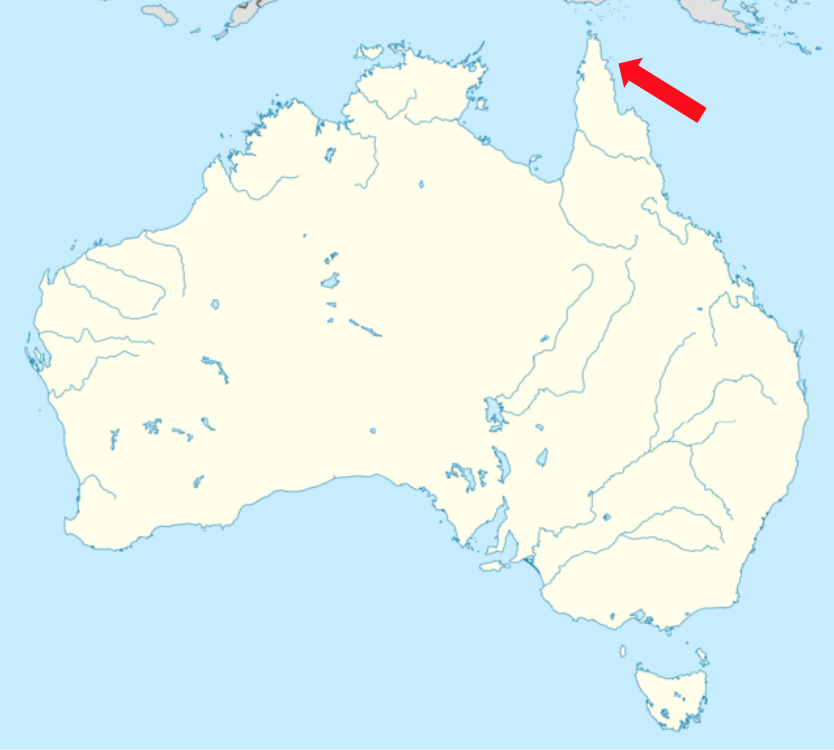
Australia's Perry Island, indicated by the red arrow, on map

This marine species is endemic to northeastern Australia and is distributed in the marine waters between the Home Islands, particularly Perry Island, and the state of Queensland.

I. glauce has been found at benthic depths, the lowest ecological zone in the ocean, thus considered macrobenthos.

== See also ==
- Pseudomelatomidae
- Inquisitor
