= Piper Islands National Park =

National park in Queensland, Australia

- IUCN category II (national park)
- Location within Queensland
- Location: Queensland
- Coordinates: 12°13′10″S 143°15′49″E
- Area: 7 ha (17 acres)
- Established: 1989
- Governing body: Queensland Parks and Wildlife Service
- Website: Official website

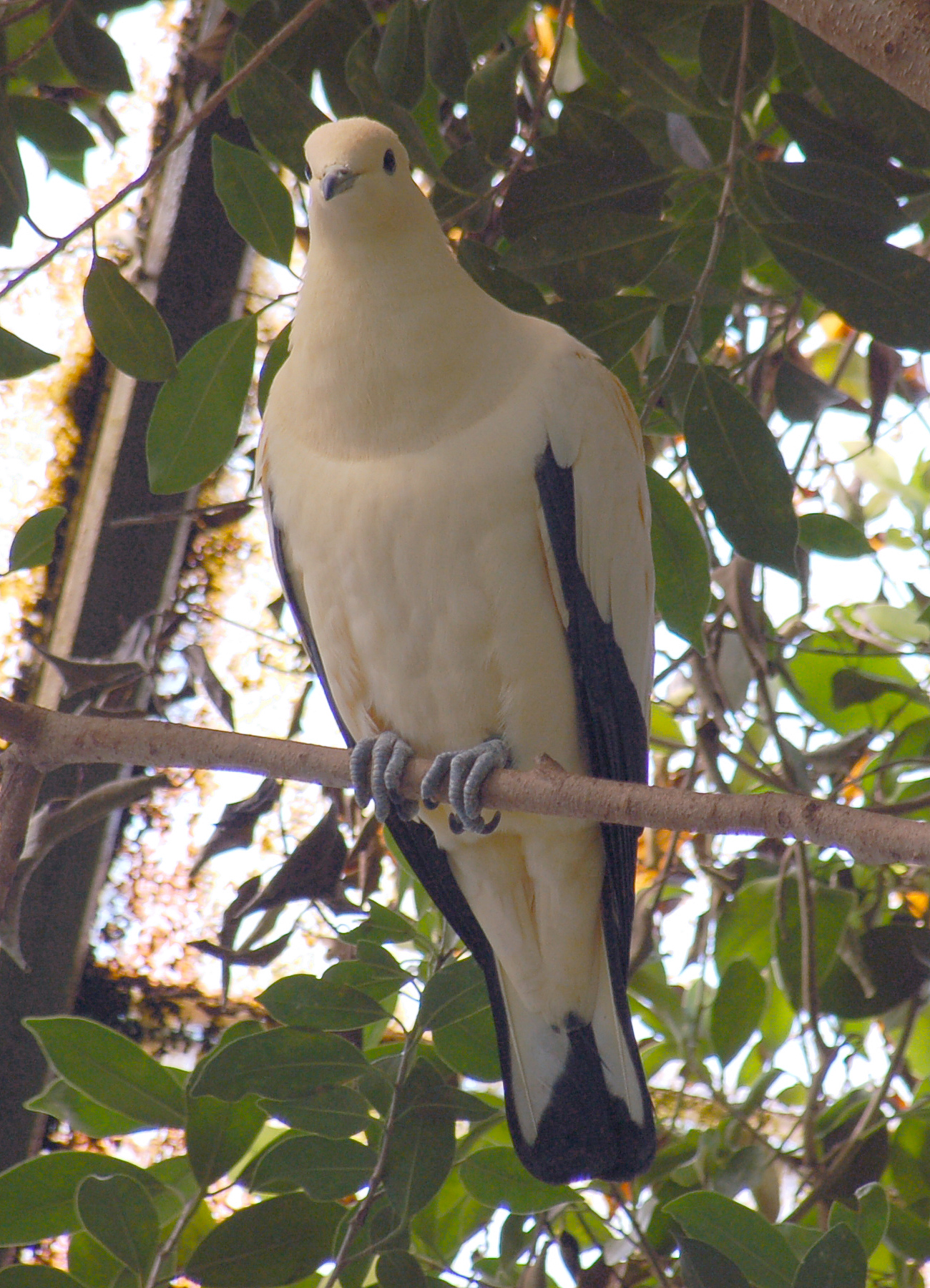
The islands are an important breeding site for pied imperial pigeons

The Piper Islands National Park is a national park in Far North Queensland, Australia. It lies 1977 km northwest of Brisbane. It comprises four small islands lying on the inner northern Great Barrier Reef off the eastern coast of the Cape York Peninsula in Temple Bay, between Cape Grenville and Fair Cape.

== Birds ==
The islands have been identified by BirdLife International as an Important Bird Area (IBA) because they have supported over 1% of the world populations of pied imperial pigeons (with up to 4000 nests) and black noddies (up to 7500 nests).

== Islands ==
- Baird Island (1 ha) – coral and shingle cay with mangroves (dominated by Rhizophora stylosa and Avicennia marina) growing to a canopy height of 5 m
- Beesley Island (2.4 ha) – cay with grasses and herbs, sharing the same reef as Baird Island
- Farmer Island (7 ha) – cay with a grass and shrub exterior and a wooded interior dominated by Pisonia grandis forest up to 4 m in height
- Fisher Island (3 ha) – coral shingle cay with shrubs and mangroves, sharing the same reef as Fisher Island

== See also ==
- Protected areas of Queensland
