= Orton Island =

Island in Queensland, Australia

- Interactive map of Orton Island

Geography
- Location: Northern Australia
- Coordinates: 11.995°S 143.242°E
- Area: 0.11 km^{2} (0.042 sq mi)

Administration
- Australia
- State: Queensland

Orton Island is an island about 1 km southeast of Cape Grenville in the Great Barrier Reef Marine Park Queensland, Australia, in Temple Bay about 200 km northeast of Kutini-Payamu National Park and Lockhart River in the Cape York Peninsula. It is around 11 hectares or 0.11 square km in size.

This island is part of the Home Islands.
