= Perry Island (Queensland) =

- Interactive map of Perry Island

Geography
- Location: Great Barrier Reef Marine Park
- Coordinates: 11.969°S 143.254°E
- Archipelago: Home Islands
- Area: 0.07 km^{2} (0.027 sq mi)

Administration
- Australia
- State: Queensland

Perry Island is an island about 1 kilometre (0.62 mi) east of Cape Grenville in the Great Barrier Reef Marine Park Queensland, Australia, in Temple Bay about 200 kilometres (120 mi) north-east of Kutini-Payamu National Park and Lockhart River in the Cape York Peninsula. It is around 7 hectares or 0.07 square km in size.

This island is part of Home Islands.

== See also ==
- List of islands of Australia
