= Rodney Island =

Island in Shelburne Bay, Queensland, Australia

- Interactive map of Rodney Island

Geography
- Location: Northern Australia
- Coordinates: 11.889°S 143.108°E

Administration
- Australia
- State: Queensland

Rodney Island is a small island in Shelburne Bay in far north Queensland, Australia a few hundred metres north of Cape Grenville, Cape York Peninsula in the Great Barrier Reef Marine Park Queensland, Australia. It is part of the Cape York to Cape Grenville Islands Important Bird Area.

== Mining ==
The threat of mining to the area became evident in the 1980s when it emerged that the dune fields of Shelburne Bay were being targeted by the silica sandmining industry. The mining of mining leases 5940 and 5941, the last remaining mining leases in the area, would have involved removing and destroying two major dune systems together with the construction of a major port facility from the eastern end of Shelburne Bay via Rodney Island to the deep water offshore.

Public concern at the prospect of sandmining over parts of Shelburne Bay was a key factor in the implementation of the joint state and Commonwealth Cape York Land Use Study. This study, undertaken between 1989 and 1998, was to ensure that appropriate land use decisions on Cape York would be made following wide public consultation and an assessment of competing land uses and values.

The Shelburne Bay project was worth $4,000 million a year to the Australian economy. It was to mine 200,000 tonnes a year of pure silicon. At that time the price of pure silicon meant that it was worth $4,000 million to the Australian economy. It is a 99.98 per cent super pure rich deposit.

== See also ==
- Save Shelburne
