= Pig Island (Queensland) =

Island in Australia

- Interactive map of Pig Island

Geography
- Location: Northern Australia
- Coordinates: 11.837°S 143.315°E
- Area: 1.6 km^{2} (0.62 sq mi)

Administration
- Australia
- State: Queensland

Pig Island is a small island in far north Queensland, Australia, 19 km North East of Cape Grenville in the Great Barrier Reef Marine Park Queensland, Australia and is part of the Cockburn Islands. It is around 160 hectares or 1.6 square km in size.

It is to the north of Bootie Island, Manley Islet and Buchen Rock within the Cockburn Reef adjacent to Pollard Channel and next to the Sir Charles Hardy Islands.
