= Perry Island =

Perry Island may refer to

- Perry Island (Alaska)
- Perry Island (Maryland)
- Perry Island (Queensland)
- Île Perry, in the Rivière des Prairies north of Montreal Île Perry
- Sarushima

== See also ==
- Parry Island
