= Magra Islet =

Islet in Queensland, Australia

Coordinates: 11°51′29″S 143°16′55″E

Magra Islet is off the coast of Queensland, Australia, 15 km northeast of Cape Grenville in the Great Barrier Reef Marine Park. Positioned at the north end of Cockburn Reef and 2.5 km from Bootie Island, it is primarily a sandy shoal with little vegetation.

This islet is a part of the Cockburn Islands in the Wuthathi Tumra Region of the GBR Marine Park and falls within the boundaries of the Saunders Islands National Park.

Magra Islet was named after James Mario Matra, a midshipman on HMS Endeavour, by Captain James Cook. Matra is believed to be the first American to visit what is now Australia.
