= Pig Island =

Pig Island may refer to:

- Pig Island (novel), a British thriller novel
- Pig Island (Queensland), Australia
- Pig Island, an island in Greenspond, Newfoundland and Labrador, Canada
- Pig Island / Mātau, in Lake Wakatipu, New Zealand
- Pig Island, County Down, a townland in County Down, Northern Ireland
- Pig Beach, also known as Pig Island, the Bahamas
- "Pig Island", a song by Sandra Boynton and Michael Ford from the album Philadelphia Chickens

== See also ==
- Hog Island (disambiguation)
- Île aux Cochons, Crozet Archipelago, South Indian Ocean
