= Hibbertia rufociliata =

Scientific classification
- Kingdom: Plantae
- Clade: Tracheophytes
- Clade: Angiosperms
- Clade: Eudicots
- Order: Dilleniales
- Family: Dilleniaceae
- Genus: Hibbertia
- Species: H. rufociliata

Binomial name
- Hibbertia rufociliata Toelken

Species of plant

Hibbertia rufociliata is a species of flowering plant in the family Dilleniaceae and is endemic to a restricted area of north Queensland. It is a shrub with hairy foliage, elliptic to lance-shaped leaves with the narrower end towards the base, and yellow flowers usually arranged singly in leaf axils with 36 to 44 stamens arranged in bundles around two densely scaly carpels.

== Description ==
Hibbertia rufociliata is a shrub that typically grows to a height of 50–80 cm (20–31 in), sometimes to 1.5 m (4 ft 11 in), and has hairy foliage. The leaves are elliptic to lance-shaped with the narrower end towards the base, mostly 25–35 mm (0.98–1.38 in) long and 3–7.5 mm (0.12–0.30 in) wide on a petiole 0.6–2.4 mm (0.024–0.094 in) long. The lower surface of the leaves is densely hairy. The flowers are usually arranged singly in leaf axils, each flower on a stout peduncle 3.5–4.8 mm (0.14–0.19 in) long, with broadly egg-shaped bracts 1.2–1.7 mm (0.047–0.067 in) long at the base. The five sepals are joined at the base, the two outer sepal lobes 3.4–4.1 mm (0.13–0.16 in) long and 1.2–1.4 mm (0.047–0.055 in) wide, and the inner lobes longer and broader. The five petals are broadly egg-shaped with the narrower end towards the base, yellow, 6.6–7.8 mm (0.26–0.31 in) long and there are 36 to 44 stamens arranged in bundles around the two densely scaly carpels, each carpel with two ovules. Flowering occurs from April to July.

== Taxonomy ==
Hibbertia rufociliata was first formally described in 2010 by Hellmut R. Toelken in the Journal of the Adelaide Botanic Gardens from specimens collected by Leonard John Brass near Browns Creek, a tributary of the Pascoe River, in 1948. The specific epithet (rufociliata) refers to the rufous hairs characteristic of this species.

== Distribution and habitat ==
This hibbertia grows on sandy ridges in forest in a few locations on Cape York Peninsula in far northern Queensland.

== Conservation status ==
Hibbertia rufociliata is classified as of "least concern" under the Queensland Government Nature Conservation Act 1992.

== See also ==
- List of Hibbertia species
