= Jardine Islet =

Islet in Australia

Coordinates: 11°22′48″S 142°58′05″E

Jardine Islet is a small island in the Boydong cays, Shelburne Bay in far north Queensland, Australia about 100 km north of Cape Grenville, Cape York Peninsula in the Great Barrier Reef Marine Park Queensland, Australia.

It is a part of the East Islands group about 25 km northeast of Captain Billy Landing.
