= Weymouth Bay, Queensland =

Weymouth Bay Queensland
- Coordinates: 12.4988°S 143.3411°E
- Location: 560 km (348 mi) N of Cairns; 158 km (98 mi) E of Weipa, Queensland
- Region: Far North Queensland

Weymouth Bay is a bay in North Queensland, Australia.

== Geography ==
The bay opens onto the Coral Sea, part of the South Pacific Ocean. The Pascoe River flows into the bay. To the south of the bay is the Kutini-Payamu National Park.

== History ==
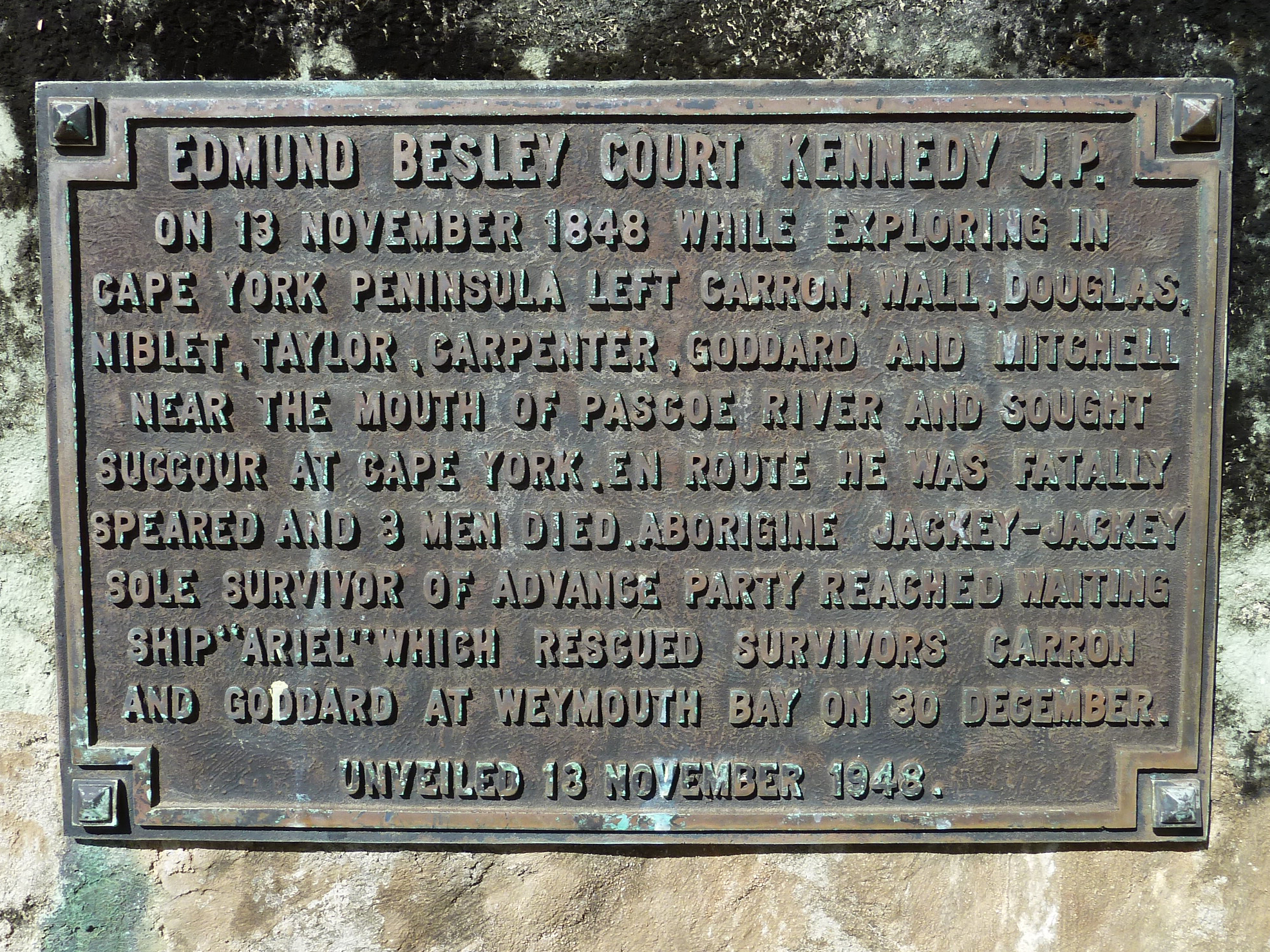
Memorial plaque, unveiled in 1948 at Weymouth Bay, for the members of Edmund Kennedy's expedition who died there

It was one of the Australian places named by James Cook during his voyage in HMS Endeavour northwards along the east coast in 1770; he named it on Friday 17 August 1770.

Weymouth Bay was significant in the exploration of the Cape York Peninsula by Edmund Kennedy in 1848. During their journey north from Rockingham Bay (near the present-day town of Cardwell), Kennedy left eight members of the expedition at Weymouth Bay, intending to pick them up later on the return by sea. However Kennedy and all but one member died later during the journey; all but two of the eight members left at Weymouth Bay died before they were relieved.
