= Parry Island =

Parry Island or Islands may refer to:

- Parry Island (Ontario), in Georgian Bay, Ontario, Canada, site of the Wasauksing First Nation
- Parry Island (Pacific), part of Enewetak Atoll in the Pacific Ocean and a fighting theatre in World War II
- Parry Island, former name of Philip Island (British Columbia)
- Parry Islands, former name of the Queen Elizabeth Islands, Canada

== See also ==
- Perry Island (disambiguation)
