= James Matra =

American Loyalist sailor & diplomat (1746–1806)

- Born: c. 1746; New York
- Died: March 29, 1806 (aged 59–60); Tangier, Morocco

James Mario Matra (c. 1746 – 29 March 1806), sailor and diplomat, was a Province of New York-born midshipman on the voyage by James Cook to Botany Bay in 1770. He is known by the surname Matra and Magra (following his father's name change). His Matra family clan had been one of the three families who led the revolt against their long-standing Genoese overlords in Corsica (the other two being the Boneparte and Paoli clans). They had jointly established the Corsican Republic, the world's first elected constitutional republic—but perpetual feuding between the three main families allowed the French to take possession a few year later (with the Boneparte family agreement).

The Matra's were Anglophiles and so went into exile in Ireland briefly, then migrated to New York where James Matra was born. His father had changed the family name to "Magra" (he was also James Maria Magra), so there is regular confusion between the Matra (original) and Magra (later) versions of the name.

He had sailed with Cook and Banks on HMS Endeavour when it chartered the east coast of New Holland and discovered Botany Bay and Port Jackson.

Following the British Loyalist defeat by American Patriot forces in the American Revolution, James Matra submitted a plan "A Proposal for Establishing a Settlement in New South Wales" (24 August 1783) for the first Australian settlement in the Sydney area, known as the "Matra Plan". In its original form it did not include convicts, but on the advice of Joseph Banks British convicts were included.

This plan had evolved over a few years (1783–1786) with the help of his close friend Sir Joseph Banks to become the so-called "Botany Bay colony" which was really a code-name to prevent French spies from learning about the existence of Sydney Harbour. Matra's motives were primarily to promote the colony as a safe refuge for the ex-slave, Black Loyalist who had fought with the British, and then found temporary refuge in Nova Scotia. But he obviously also knew that Cook (under Admiralty orders) had a secondary purpose when charting the eastern Australian coast, which was to find a harbour for a British Pacific fleet.

He worked with British Home Undersecretary Evan Nepean and his political superior Lord Sydney on this plan for three years, but the Prime Minister William Pitt the Younger, while strongly anti-slavery was convinced by the "Emancipist" faction of this early "Abolitionist" movement to send Black African ex-slaves back to Africa.

At the last minutes of 1786 the new UK Tory administration of the Pitt the Younger sent the First Fleet to Australia. The Black Loyalists were to be sent to Granville Town in Africa (Sierra Leone) under an Emancipation ("Blacks to Africa") policy, and so convicts became the sole purpose for urgently populating the new colony.

The UK only had a temporary problem with housing convicts which was being overcome by building new penitentiaries, but 'convict transportation' became the official explanation for the new colony, despite the expense of transporting them half-way around the world, by-passing closer settlement areas in Africa and Southern Australia. This was done solely to hide their real motivation in establishing a Pacific base for the Royal Navy in what was said to be the "best sailing ship harbour in the world".

== Revolutionary attitudes ==
Matra was the first person of Corsican heritage to visit the future nation of Australia, which had established the world's first modern constitutional democracy, the Corsican Republic, with both female suffrage and a state university. The rebellion in 1755 which defeated their Genoan overlords, was led by a triumvirate of Pasquale Paoli, James Mario Matra/Magra (Senior), and Carlo Boneparte, the father of the later French Emperor, Napoleon. The triumvirate later broke up due to Paoli's dictatorial control.

A second attempt had been made in 1794 to establish an Anglo-Corsican Kingdom with strong links to Britain, but it also failed—but retained its British associations. However the Corsican Revolution with its constitution in 1755 was thirty years ahead, and provided a model for both the American Revolution and French Revolution.

James Matra was, therefore, steeped in Abolitionist ideals including total opposition to slavery, with the concepts of individual freedom, less draconian punishment, and the value of an elected constitutional Diet. And this clearly lay behind his Matra Plan proposal On his return to Britain with Cook and Banks on the 'Endeavour' in 1770, the younger James Matra had very quickly published an account of the voyage, which was heavily censored to helped Cook and the British Admiralty disguise the existence of Sydney Harbour from the French.

The American and French Revolutions forced an 18-year gap between the Port Jackson discovery and settlement, and every precaution had to be taken to stop the existence of Port Jackson leaking out to the French. This included Cook faking some map features, and the need for oaths of secrecy by those closely involved, specifically Banks and Matra.

After his Tahiti observations of the transit of Venus, Cook had been instructed to check the South Pacific for the possibilities of the mythical 'Terra Australis Incognito' continent. And after circumnavigating New Zealand, he followed a secret commission by the Admiralty to find them a deep-port harbour on the Pacific coast of New Holland. This was to be used as a home-base for a British Pacific Fleet in order to counter French interests in the same area; the French navigators Louis Antoine de Bougainville and Jean-François de Galaup, comte de Lapérouse had been sent out for similar reasons.

== Anti-slavery ==
In America during the American Revolution, the Matra family (brothers James and Perkins) clearly worked with the anti-slavery family groups of East Florida governor Patrick Tonyn and his brother Captain George Tonyn. George Tonyn appears have mentored James Matra (then known as Magra) during the Seven Years' War and then found him a special berth on Cook's Endeavour as a 'gentleman-midshipman'. George's brother Governor General Patrick Tonyn became the last official in America when the British were defeated: he had been given the task of transporting these ex-slave Black Loyalist recruits to a place of guaranteed freedom. As governor during the Revolution, he had recruited two Black Loyalist regiments on the promise of asylum after the fighting ceased

Both sides of the American Revolution had enlisted ex-slaves on promises of freedom and land upon success. During the Revolution, both the Earl of Dunmore and Governor Patrick Tonyn had issued very public proclamations offering freedom, and guaranteed refuge with a self-supporting plot of land to escaped slaves for their wartime services. (See Dunmore's Proclamation and the Philipsburg Proclamation) However at the end of fighting, some ex-slaves had been forcefully returned to their masters, while others were re-enslaved despite being in West Indies refuges.

Also prominent in promoting ex-slaves to join special Black Loyalist regiments were members of the New York Delancy (aka de Lancey and Delancey) family, headed originally by James De Lancey, the Lieutenant Governor of New York. The whole family was involved in raising and equipping the De Lancey's Brigade with three white battalions from New York State (led by Oliver and James De Lancey (loyalist)) along with two specifically Black Regiments.

These long-established family activist groups often had slaves themselves, but they were "abolitionists". They saw slavery as an institution that could not just be shut off overnight. At the end of the Revolutionary War, they appear to have jointly established extensive Black Loyalist resettlement activities with the aid of Lord Sydney (Thomas Townshend) and Evan Nepean of the British Home office. Prime Minister Pitt the Younger was also a very close friend and supporter of William Wilberforce, the leader of the global anti-slavery movement.

Both Evan Nepean as the permanent Home Secretary and Lord Sydney as his upper-house superior, were prominent English abolitionists (promoting an end to draconian punishment, indentured servitude and slavery) who came to be celebrated as important figures in both Nova Scotia and Sydney for their efforts in honouring the proclamation assurances. Both James Matra and his brother Perkins Magra worked as Arabic-speaking diplomats for the British Home Office in the Mediterranean after the American Revolutionary period for more than 30years. They specialised in the ransom of British sailors captured and used as slaves within the Ottomon Empire. Their lives were focussed on the problem of slavery half a century before full anti-slave Acts were passed in Britain

Captain Arthur Phillip who was chosen as first governor of the new Sydney colony was an ex-spy for Evan Nepean and the Home Office in France. When chosen to lead the colonial establishment he insisted that his commission be rewritten to specifically prohibit slavery.

The suburb of Matraville in New South Wales is named after the younger James Matra for his efforts in promoting the first Australian colony, and this suburb is less than 2 kilometres away from Botany Bay. But "Botany Bay" was never seriously considered as a settlement site by the British it was far too exposed and shallow: it was used as a codename to hide the fact that the superb Port Jackson harbour existed only a few miles to the north.

== Biography ==
His father, also James, was a member of a prominent Corsican family. After the failure of the Corsican Republic and who had migrated to Dublin, Ireland in the early 1730s, where he studied medicine and changed his surname from Matra to Magra. He moved to New York City, where his son James Mario Magra was born in 1746. James Mario later settled in England.

Australian historians remember him for him being falsely accused of misbehaviour aboard James Cook's Endeavour on its voyage of exploration to New Holland in 1768–70. Magra was suspected of snipping off the earlobes of Cook's drunken and alcoholic clerk after stripping him naked while he was drunk. Later the real culprit was exposed and he deserted while the Endeavour was in Batavia.

In 1775, Magra petitioned the King to have his surname revert to its original form Matra, in order to claim a Corsican inheritance.

Matra was the author of the "Proposal for Establishing a Settlement in New South Wales" put forward in 1783, which the immediate forerunner of the official and semi-official "plans" was resulting in the foundation of the first Australian colony.

In a letter to the British Government in 1783, Matra discussed the potential commercial benefits to Britain of a settlement. He recommended that Britain should send American loyalists and later some minor convicts, to settle at Botany Bay in New South Wales. He looked forward to Australia as an asylum for "those unfortunate loyalists to whom Great Britain was bound by every tie of honour and gratitude and with visions, perhaps, of a reproduction of the life of the planters of Virginia and Carolina". At this time he was a British diplomat in the Mediterranean, engaged in the ransom of slaves seized by Islamic and Barbary piracy. He pushed the Matra Plan perhaps partly because he had aspirations to become the first Governor of the new penal colony.

His biographer, Alan Frost, in 1995, noted that "silence covered Matra's activities until March 1777", when he applied for leave from his post as consul at Teneriffe in the Canary Islands to deal with family matters in British-occupied New York. He was embassy secretary in Constantinople 1778–80. In 1786 Matra accepted the appointment of consul in Tangier, Morocco. In October 1793 Matra married Henrietta Maxwell, daughter of the army victualling agent at Gibraltar. They had no children. He remained in Tangier until his death there on 29 March 1806.

James Matra is remembered in the Sydney suburb of Matraville, and in the islet of Magra on the Great Barrier Reef.

== Published works ==
- Matra, J., P.A. de Hondt, & T. Becket. (1771). A journal of a voyage round the world, in His Majesty's ship Endeavour, in the years 1768, 1769, 1770, and 1771 : Undertaken in pursuit of natural knowledge, at the desire of the Royal Society : Containing all the various occurrences of the voyage, with descriptions of several new discovered countries in the Southern Hemisphere ... : To which is added a concise vocabulary of the language of Otahitee. London: Printed for T. Becket and P.A. de Hondt ... MMS ID 991018348089702626
- Matra, James Mario, et al. Nachricht Von Den Neuesten Entdeckungen Der Engländer in Der Süd-See; Oder, Auszug Aus Dem Tagebuch Des Königl : Schiffs The Endeavor, Welches in Den Jahren 1768 Bis 1771, Eine Reise Um Die Welt Gethan, Und Auf Derselben Verschiedene Bisher Unbekannte Länder in Der südlichen Hemisphäre Entdeckt Hat, Nebst Einer Kurzen Beschreibung Dieser Länder ...Und Einer Kleinen Probe Von Der Sprache Die in Jenem Theil Der Welt üblich Ist. Bey Haube Und Spencer, 1772. MMS ID 991013432619702626
