= Wallace Islet =

- Interactive map of Wallace Islet

Geography
- Location: Northern Australia
- Coordinates: 11.448°S 143.034°E
- Area: 0.04 km^{2} (0.015 sq mi)

Administration
- Australia
- State: Queensland

Wallace Islet is a small island in the Boydong cays, Shelburne Bay in far north Queensland, Australia about 100 km north of Cape Grenville, Cape York Peninsula in the Great Barrier Reef Marine Park Queensland, Australia. It is around 4 hectares or 0.04 square km in size.

It is a part of the East Islands group about 25 km northeast of Captain Billy Landing.

A cruise ship anchorage is situated there.
