= Sunter Island =

Island in Queensland, Australia

- Location within Queensland

Geography
- Location: Pacific Ocean
- Coordinates: 12.781°S 143.411°E
- Area: 1 ha (2.5 acres)

Administration
- Australia
- State: Queensland

Sunter Island is an island located in the Aboriginal Shire of Lockhart River, Queensland, Australia.

== Geography ==
The island is part of the Great Barrier Reef Marine Park situated in Lloyd Bay between Lockhart River and Cape Direction, Queensland. It covers an area of approximately 0.01 square kilometres.
