= Lloyd Island =

Island in Queensland, Australia

Lloyd Island is an island in the Aboriginal Shire of Lockhart River, Queensland, Australia.

== Geography ==
Lloyd Island
- Interactive map of Lloyd Island

Geography
- Location: Northern Australia
- Coordinates: 12.761°S 143.400°E

Administration
- Australia
- State: Queensland

Lloyd Island is part of the Great Barrier Reef Marine Park in Lloyd Bay between Lockhart River and Cape Direction.

Lloyd Island is a popular subject for Aboriginal artists such as Adrian King.
