= Saunders Islet =

- Interactive map of Saunders Islet

Geography
- Location: Northern Australia
- Coordinates: 11.702°S 143.181°E
- Area: 0.11 km^{2} (0.042 sq mi)

Administration
- Australia
- State: Queensland

Saunders Islet is a small island in the Northern part of Shelburne Bay in far north Queensland, Australia about 30 km north of Cape Grenville, Cape York Peninsula in the Great Barrier Reef Marine Park. It is 11 hectares or 0.11 square km in size.
