= Rosella Namok =

Australian artist (born 1979)

- Born: 19 May 1979 (age 46); Lockhart River, Queensland
- Known for: painting
- Movement: Lockhart River Art Gang
- Awards: 2003 High Court of Australia Centenary Art Prize

Rosella Namok (born 19 May 1979) is an Indigenous Australian artist from Lockhart River, Queensland. Namok was taught art at high school and learned printmaking and other techniques through a community art project in 1997 that led to the formation of a group of artists known as the Lockhart River Art Gang.

Namok is notable for her paintings, and has won the 2003 High Court of Australia Centenary Art Prize. By 2007 she had held eighteen solo exhibitions in Australia and overseas.

== Study and early career ==
Namok studied art at high school and when Fran and Geoff Barker—one a former teacher, the other with experience in design and manufacturing—set up an art program for school-leavers at Lockhart River, Namok was amongst the first to learn printmaking with them in 1995. In 1997, the Barkers and artists including Namok took some of the prints to an exhibition in Canberra, where they were seen by prominent curators Betty Churcher and Margo Neale, who bought some for the Queensland Art Gallery and the National Gallery of Australia. It was an extraordinary start for what became known as the Lockhart River Art Gang.

The Art Gang, of which Namok is a leading member, is distinctive for being a successful Indigenous art movement made up of young members of the community; this contrasts with movements such as Papunya Tula, which emerged from amongst a community's traditional elders. The contrast between Namok's works and those of the central desert artists has highlighted the diversity of contemporary Indigenous art.

== Recognition ==
Aged 21, Namok won the Australian Heritage Commission's Lin Onus Youth Award for Indigenous art, for her work Kungkay and Yiipay in Salmon Season. The painting was described by the judges as marking "a fleeting, inspired moment, capturing it in a permanent patterning".

In October 2003, Namok's nine-panel painting Today Now... We All Got To Go By The Same Laws won the High Court Centenary Art Prize. Described by Justice Gleeson of the court as a "bold, beautiful, confident and contemporary" work, it portrayed the emergence of modern law from Aboriginal pre-history. Later that same month, The Bulletin with Newsweek named Namok as amongst its ten "brightest, most creative" people in Australian arts and entertainment.

Namok is a prolific artist, and by 2007, aged 28, had held eighteen solo exhibitions, both in Australia and overseas, in locations including New York and Berlin. She is regarded as an important contemporary Australian artist whose works attract high prices in the art market.

Namok's partner is Wayne Butcher, and she has two children, Isaiah, born in September 1997, and Zane, born March 2001. While Namok lives in North Queensland, son Zane was born in Sydney: she had come to the city to submit a painting for the Wynne Prize, but was taken straight from the airport to hospital, where she gave birth.

== Collections ==
- Art Gallery of New South Wales
- Art Gallery of South Australia
- Art Gallery of Western Australia
- Museum of Contemporary Art, Sydney
- National Gallery of Australia
- National Gallery of Victoria
- Queensland Art Gallery
- Adelaide Festival Centre
- Federal Court of Australia
- Kluge-Ruhe Museum, University of Virginia
- High Court of Australia

== Awards ==
- 2000 – Lin Onus Youth Award, Australian Heritage Commission's Indigenous Heritage Art Awards
- 2003 – High Court of Australia Centenary Art Prize

== See also ==
- Contemporary Indigenous Australian art
