= Sinclair Islet =

- Island
- Sinclair Islet is located in Australia Map
- Coordinates: 11.108°S 143.018°E
- Country: Australia
- State: Queensland

Sinclair Islet is a small island north of Shelburne Bay in far north Queensland, Australia about 150 km north of Cape Grenville, Cape York Peninsula in the Great Barrier Reef Marine Park Queensland, Australia.

It is about 40 km east from Orford Ness and the Apudthama National Park.

Sinclair Islet was identified Great Barrier Reef Marine Park Authority as a high priority Representative Areas Program (RAP) by the nesting sites of hawksbill sea turtles.
