= Chapman Island (Queensland) =

Chapman Island Queensland
- Coordinates: 12°53′10″S 143°36′14″E
- LGA(s): Lockhart River
- State electorate(s): Cook
- Federal division(s): Leichhardt

Chapman Island is an island in the Aboriginal Shire of Lockhart River, Queensland, Australia.

== Geography ==
It is part of the Great Barrier Reef Marine Park West of Cape Melville, Queensland and East of Coen between the second three mile opening and Providential Channel of the Barrier Reef about 30 km South East of Lockhart River.

The island is 10 km North East of Old Lochart River and 5 km South East of Cape Direction and covers an area of about 2 hectares.
