= Sherrard Island =

Island in Queensland, Australia

- Interactive map of Sherrard Island

Geography
- Location: Northern Australia
- Coordinates: 12.985°S 143.612°E
- Area: 0.02 km^{2} (0.0077 sq mi)

Administration
- Australia
- State: Queensland

Sherrard Island is an island in the Aboriginal Shire of Lockhart River in Queensland, Australia.

== Geography ==
It is part of the Great Barrier Reef Marine Park north-west of Cape Melville, Queensland and north-east of Coen between the first three-mile (4.8 km) opening and the second three-mile (4.8 km) opening of the Barrier Reef about 100 km (62 mi) south-east of Lockhart River in the Osborn Channel.

The island is 10 km (6.2 mi) east of Old Lockhart River and 30 km (19 mi) south of Cape Direction.

== See also ==
- List of islands of Australia
