= Sunday Islet (Queensland) =

Islet in Queensland, Australia

- Interactive map of Sunday Islet

Geography
- Location: Northern Australia
- Coordinates: 11.929585°S 143.2101774°E
- Area: 0.15 km^{2} (0.058 sq mi)
- Length: 0.5 km (0.31 mi)
- Width: 0.4 km (0.25 mi)

Administration
- Australia
- State: Queensland

Demographics
- Population: 0

Sunday Islet is a small island in far north Queensland, Australia 2.5 km north of Cape Grenville Peninsula in the Great Barrier Reef Marine Park Queensland, Australia.

On Sunday 31 May 1789, after the mutiny on the Bounty, Captain Bligh and the men who remained loyal to him arrived on the island on the ship's boat. He named it Sunday Island because that day was a Sunday.
