= Sir Charles Hardy Islands =

Islands in Queensland, Australia

- Location within Australia

Geography
- Coordinates: 11.918°S 143.481°E
- Area: 0.18 km^{2} (0.069 sq mi)

Administration
- Australia

Sir Charles Hardy Islands is in the reef of the same name adjacent to Pollard Channel & Blackwood Channel about 40 km east of Cape Grenville off Cape York Peninsula.

== Shipwrecks ==
Shipwrecks in this area include:

=== Charles Eaton ===
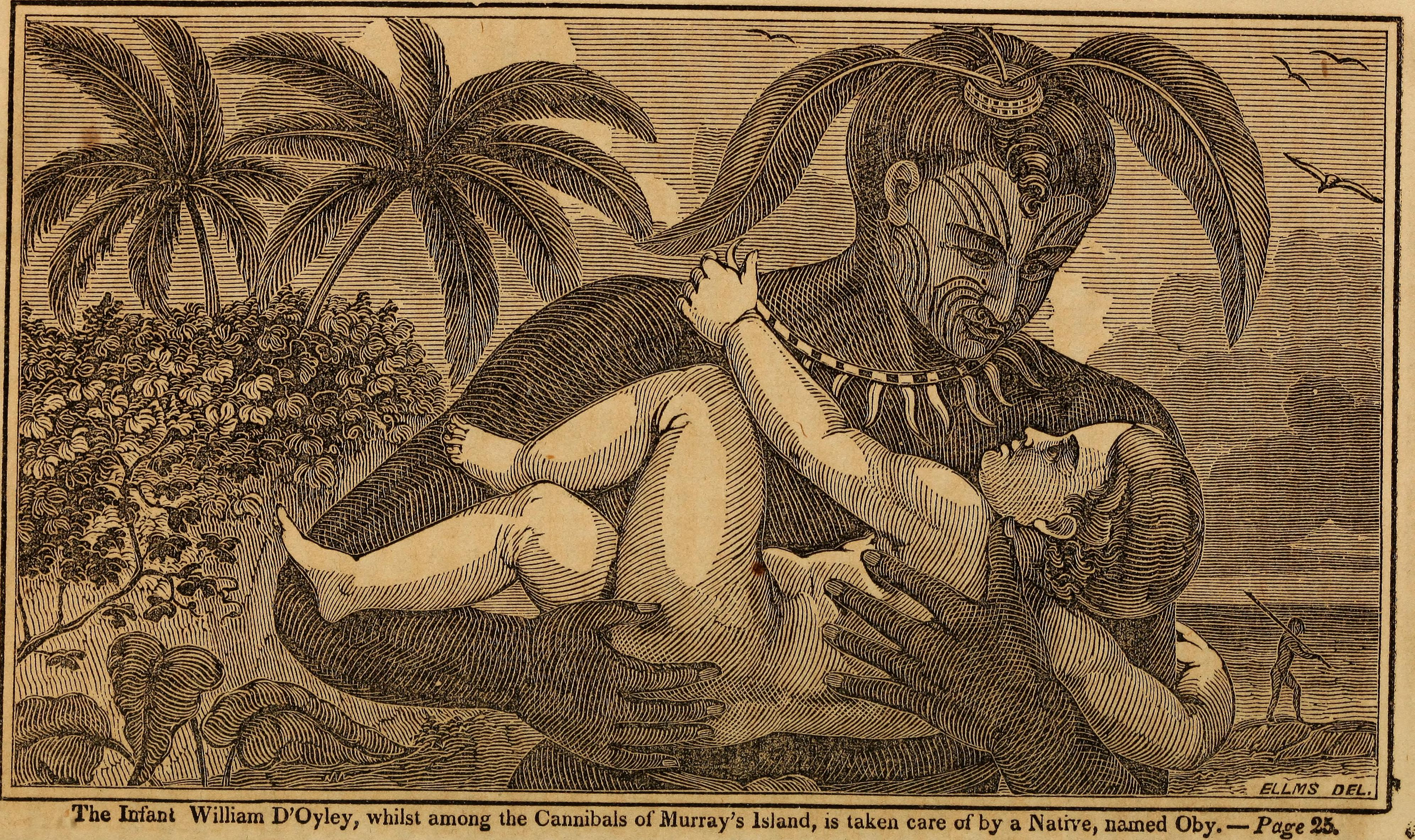
William D'Oyly being taken care of by a native named Oby. Illustration from The tragedy of the seas (1848).

- Charles Eaton. Barque, 313 tons. Reg. London. Captain Frederick G. Moore.

On board was Captain Thomas D'Oyly of the Bengal Artillery and his family. On its voyage from Sydney to India, it struck the Great Detached Reef, approximately 40 miles east of the Sir Charles Hardy Islands, on the outer Barrier Reef on 15 August 1834. Four of the crew succeeded in launching the only undamaged boat and were subsequently joined by two other sailors who swam across the reef. They set out for Timor but came ashore at what was then called Timor Laut, north east of Timor. Today the island is called Yamdena and it is part of the Tenimbar group of islands.

Those abandoned at the wreck made two rafts, which separately set out for the mainland. The first raft reached a small sandy cay known today as Boydang, inhabited at the time by about 60 Torres Strait Islanders on a fishing expedition. The second raft, which left the wreck a week or more later, was intercepted by the islanders and taken to a small sandy cay called Wallace Island. The visiting Torres Strait islanders murdered all except two ship's boys, John Ireland and John Sexton, and the two young sons of Captain Thomas D'Oyly and his wife Charlotte. They were George, aged seven, and William, aged three. The Torres Strait islanders had only limited contact with white people in 1834 and believed that they were the ghosts of dead people and therefore already not in the land of the living. Only the four boys were identified as having potential trading value as the possible ghosts of dead islanders.

The four boys lived with their captors for some months, when two of the boys, the ship's boy John Ireland and young William D'Oyly, were rescued by a husband and wife from Murray Island (local name Mer) in exchange for a bunch of bananas. They were Duppa and his wife Panney. They were able to identify Ireland and William D'Oyly as the ghosts of two relatives. The other two boys, ship's boy John Sexton and George D'Oyly, did not survive for long. Sexton was also murdered but George D'Oyly may have died from natural causes. The Murray Islanders treated Ireland and William D'Oyly with great kindness, from about October 1834 to June 1836, when the schooner Isabella arrived.

Reports had started appearing in the international press that survivors of the "Charles Eaton" wreck were being held at Murray Island. The New South Wales colonial government was instructed by the British Home Office to send a rescue mission. They dispatched the colonial schooner "Isabella" for that purpose, under the command of Captain Charles Morgan Lewis. Ireland and William D’Oyly were handed over to Lewis in exchange for some gifts. Lewis returned with them to Sydney. The ship also carried back skulls, most of which were those of the murdered passengers and crew. Lewis took leave of absence to take the young D’Oyly back to England to be placed in the care of relatives.

=== Island Queen ===
- Island Queen. Schooner. Lost on the Great Detached Reef, 24 July 1854.

The 27 passengers and crew crowded into the longboat and set out for the Australian mainland. After passing through the Barrier Reef near the Sir Charles Hardy group of islands they received some supplies from the barque Ellen, repaired their rudder at Tuesday Island, declined an offer to board the Dutch barque De Nijverheid and proceed to Batavia, finally joining the steamer Ann which took them to Singapore.

=== Sapphire ===
- Sapphire. Wooden ship, 749 tons. Came to Australia from Liverpool, arriving 1859.

Captain Bowden. Sailed from Sydney to Gladstone, where she took on horses for Madras, leaving 8 September 1859. Wrecked on a reef near Raine Island, Queensland, 22 September 1859. The crew took to the boats but while passing through Torres Strait they were attacked by natives, several members of the crew killed. One boat sighted a derelict near the Sir Charles Hardy Islands and recognised her to be the Liverpool ship Marina, which they had last seen at Sydney. They repaired her and spent three hazardous months sailing her to Port Curtis. After being further repaired at Gladstone, she foundered off Cape Moreton, 1860, when sailing for Sydney. No lives lost. Her loss is associated with the mysterious origin of a cannon later rumoured to have been lost by the Spaniard De Quirros.

=== HMS Pandora ===
- HMS Pandora. The naval frigate sent in pursuit of Bounty mutineers and the vessel.

The Sir Charles Hardy Islands are the closest terrestrial islands, approximately 60 miles to the south-west of Pandora Entrance.

=== Firefly ===
- Firefly. The 250 ton brig captained by T. Kirby

Chartered to carry the explorer William Landsborough, his party and their supplies to last for six months in the search for Burke and Wills, before proceeding on to Surabaya. It was considered that Burke would have attempted to make a straight course from Eyres Creek to the Albert, and so the Albert was selected as the starting point. She sailed from Melbourne on 29 July 1861. After loading 30 horses and forage, on 24 August 1861 they left Brisbane to sail for the Gulf in company with the HMCSS Victoria captained by Commander William Henry Norman. A hurricane struck near Raine Island and the Firefly grounded adjacent to Sir Charles Hardy's Islands.
