= Hog Island (Aleutian Islands) =

Island in Alaska, United States

- Location within Alaska

Geography
- Location: Bering Sea
- Coordinates: 53°54′17″N 166°34′24″W
- Area: 0.224 sq mi (0.58 km^{2})
- Length: 0.932 mi (1.5 km)
- Width: 0.373 mi (0.6 km)
- Highest elevation: 308 ft (93.9 m)

Administration
- United States

Demographics
- Population: 0

Hog Island is an island in the Aleutian Islands in Unalaska Bay of Unalaska Island.

== History ==
The name originally comes from Captain Tebenkov, a Russian captain. It was first published as (Ostrov) Svinoy when the Russians placed hogs on the island.
