= Home Islands (Queensland) =

Geography
- Location: Northern Australia
- Coordinates: 11.58°S 143.16°E

Administration
- Australia
- State: Queensland

Home Islands are a group of islands located off the coast of Queensland, Australia, located at approximately 11°58′S 143°16′E. They are among the northernmost localities in the country.

== Geography ==
Geographically, the Home Islands are situated closer to Darwin, the capital of the Northern Territory, which is about 1,350 kilometers (840 miles) to the west, than to Brisbane, the capital of Queensland, located approximately 2,000 kilometers (1,240 miles) to the south-southeast.

One notable island within this group is Hicks Island, located roughly 1 kilometer (0.62 miles) southeast of Cape Grenville within the Great Barrier Reef Marine Park.
