= Cape York to Cape Grenville Islands Important Bird Area =

Important Bird Area in Queensland, Australia

Coordinates: 11°30′14″S 143°07′17″E

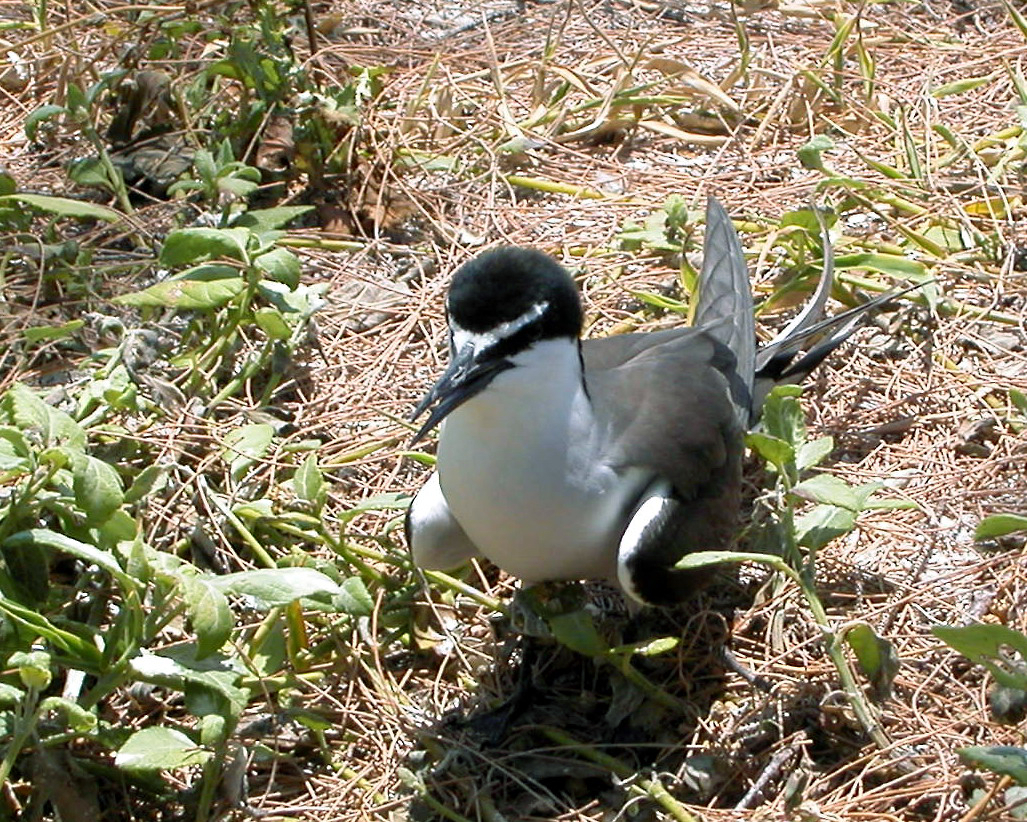
The islands form an important breeding site for bridled terns

The Cape York to Cape Grenville Islands comprise ten small islands or island groups, with a total land area of just 210 ha, scattered along the Great Barrier Reef on the eastern side of the northern end of the Cape York Peninsula between Capes York and Grenville, in Queensland, Australia. They are classified by BirdLife International as an Important Bird Area because they support over 1% of the breeding populations of the pied imperial-pigeon (with up to about 25,000 pairs), bridled tern (6000 nests), roseate tern (6000 nests) and lesser crested tern (1000 nests). Up to 1150 individuals of the migratory wader the grey-tailed tattler have also been recorded.
