= Hog Island (Kodiak Archipelago) =

- Interactive map of Hog Island

Geography
- Location: 3 miles (4.8 km) east of Afognak Island
- Coordinates: 58°0′16″N 152°41′7″W
- Archipelago: Kodiak Archipelago

Administration
- USA
- State: Alaska

Hog Island is an island within the Kodiak Archipelago east of Afognak.
