= Portland Road, Queensland =

Portland Road Queensland
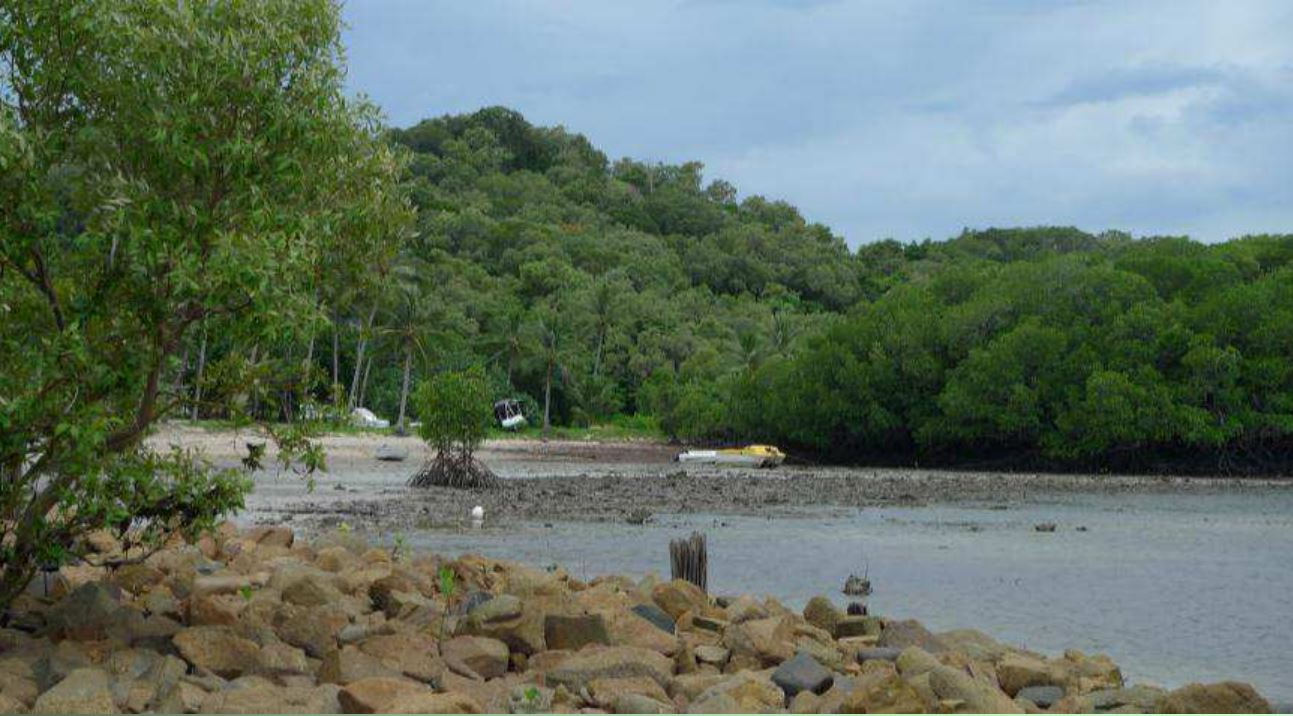
- Beach at Portland Road, 2014

- Coordinates: 12.5974°S 143.4111°E
- Postcode(s): 4892
- Time zone: AEST (UTC+10:00)
- Location: 39.3 km (24 mi) NNE of Lockhart River; 614 km (382 mi) NNW of Cooktown; 778 km (483 mi) NNW of Cairns; 2,462 km (1,530 mi) NNW of Brisbane
- LGA(s): Shire of Cook
- State electorate(s): Cook
- Federal division(s): Leichhardt

Portland Road is a coastal town in the Shire of Cook, Queensland, Australia. The town is within the locality of Iron Range.

== History ==
The town takes its name from the Portland Road harbour (12.5947°S 143.4114°E). The harbour, in turn, is named after William Henry Cavendish, Duke of Portland. The name first appears on an 1897 chart published by the British Admiralty. The use of the word "road" in a nautical context refers to a roadstead, a body of water where it is safe to anchor.

Portland Road was previously the port and support centre for Iron Range. In World War II, Portland Road became an airstrip and staging post.

== Education ==
There are no schools in Portland Road. The nearest government school is Lockhart State School (Early Childhood to Year 12) in Lockhart River to the south-west.
