= Pascoe River =

River in Far North Queensland, Australia

Pascoe
- Location of the Pascoe River mouth in Queensland

Location
- Country: Australia
- State: Queensland
- Region: Far North Queensland

Physical characteristics
- Source: Table Range, Great Dividing Range
  - location: below Mount Yangee
  - elevation: 241 m (791 ft)
- Mouth: Coral Sea
  - location: Weymouth Bay
  - coordinates: 12°30′39″S 143°15′00″E
  - elevation: 0 m (0 ft)
- Length: 119 km (74 mi)
- Basin size: 2,124 km^{2} (820 sq mi)
- Discharge
  - location: Near mouth
  - average: 60.8 m^{3}/s (1,920 GL/a)

Basin features
- Tributaries
  - left: Little Pascoe River
- National park: Kutini-Payamu National Park

The Pascoe River is a river in Far North Queensland, Australia.

The headwaters rise under Mount Yangee in the Table Range, part of the Great Dividing Range at the northern end of Cape York Peninsula. The river initially flows south then west past the Sir William Thompson Range then veers north through the mostly uninhabited country. Flowing past Hamilton Hill the river then heads east past Wattle Hill and runs parallel with the Goddard Hills forming the northern border of Kutini-Payamu National Park. The river finally discharges into Weymouth Bay and onto the Coral Sea. From source to mouth, the Pascoe River is joined by eight tributaries including the Little Pascoe River, descending 243 metres (797 ft) over its 119-kilometre (74 mi) course.

The river has a catchment area of 2,124 square kilometres (820 sq mi) of which an area of 33 square kilometres (13 sq mi) is composed of riverine wetlands.

The traditional owners of the area are the Kuuku Ya’u, Kaanju and Umpila people who maintain a strong spiritual connection to the land.

It was named after Lieutenant Robert James Pascoe, of the Royal Marines, who arrived in Somerset in 1863 to establish a settlement. The river had been named by 1867.

== See also ==
- List of rivers of Australia § Queensland
