= Aboriginal Shire of Lockhart River =

- Local government area

- Interactive map of Aboriginal Shire of Lockhart River
- Coordinates: 12.785939°S 143.342593°E
- Country: Australia
- State: Queensland
- Region: Far North Queensland
- Council seat: Lockhart River

Government
  - Mayor: Wayne William Butcher
  - State electorate: Cook
  - Federal division: Leichhardt

Area
  - Total: 3,576 km^{2} (1,381 sq mi)

Population
  - Total: 640 (2021 census)
  - Density: 0.1790/km^{2} (0.464/sq mi)
- Website: Aboriginal Shire of Lockhart River
LGAs around Aboriginal Shire of Lockhart River
Cook	Cook	Cook
Cook	Lockhart River	Coral Sea
Cook	Cook	Coral Sea

The Aboriginal Shire of Lockhart River is a local government area in Far North Queensland, Australia.

In the 2021 census, the Aboriginal Shire of Lockhart River had a population of 640 people.

== Geography ==
It is on the east coast of the Cape York Peninsula and consists of a single locality, Lockhart River (which is shared with the Shire of Cook). It includes a number of islands off the east coast: Chapman Island, Lloyd Island, Rocky Island, Sherrard Island and Sunter Island.

== Demographics ==
In the 2016 census, the Aboriginal Shire of Lockhart River had a population of 712 people.

In the 2021 census, the Aboriginal Shire of Lockhart River had a population of 640 people.

== Amenities ==
The Lockhart River Shire Council operate the Lockhart River Indigenous Knowledge Centre at Lockhart River.

== Mayors ==
- 2020–present: Wayne William Butcher
