= Bootie Island =

Island in Queensland, Australia

- Location within Queensland

Geography
- Location: Northern Australia
- Coordinates: 11.847°S 143.301°E
- Area: 0.02 km^{2} (0.0077 sq mi)

Administration
- Australia
- State: Queensland

Bootie Island is a small island in the Shire of Cook in Far North Queensland, Australia. It is part of the Cockburn Islands Group.

== Geography ==
Bootie Island is 18 km (11 mi) northeast of Cape Grenville in the Great Barrier Reef Marine Park. It is around 2 hectares or 0.02 square km in size.

The island is north of Manley Islet and Buchen Rock within the Cockburn Reef, adjacent to Pollard Channel and the Sir Charles Hardy Islands.

== History ==
The island is believed to be named after John Bootie, a midshipman on HMS Endeavour, who died at sea 4 February 1771 on the first voyage of exploration by James Cook to the eastern coast of Australia.
