= Lockhart River, Queensland =

Lockhart River
- Town
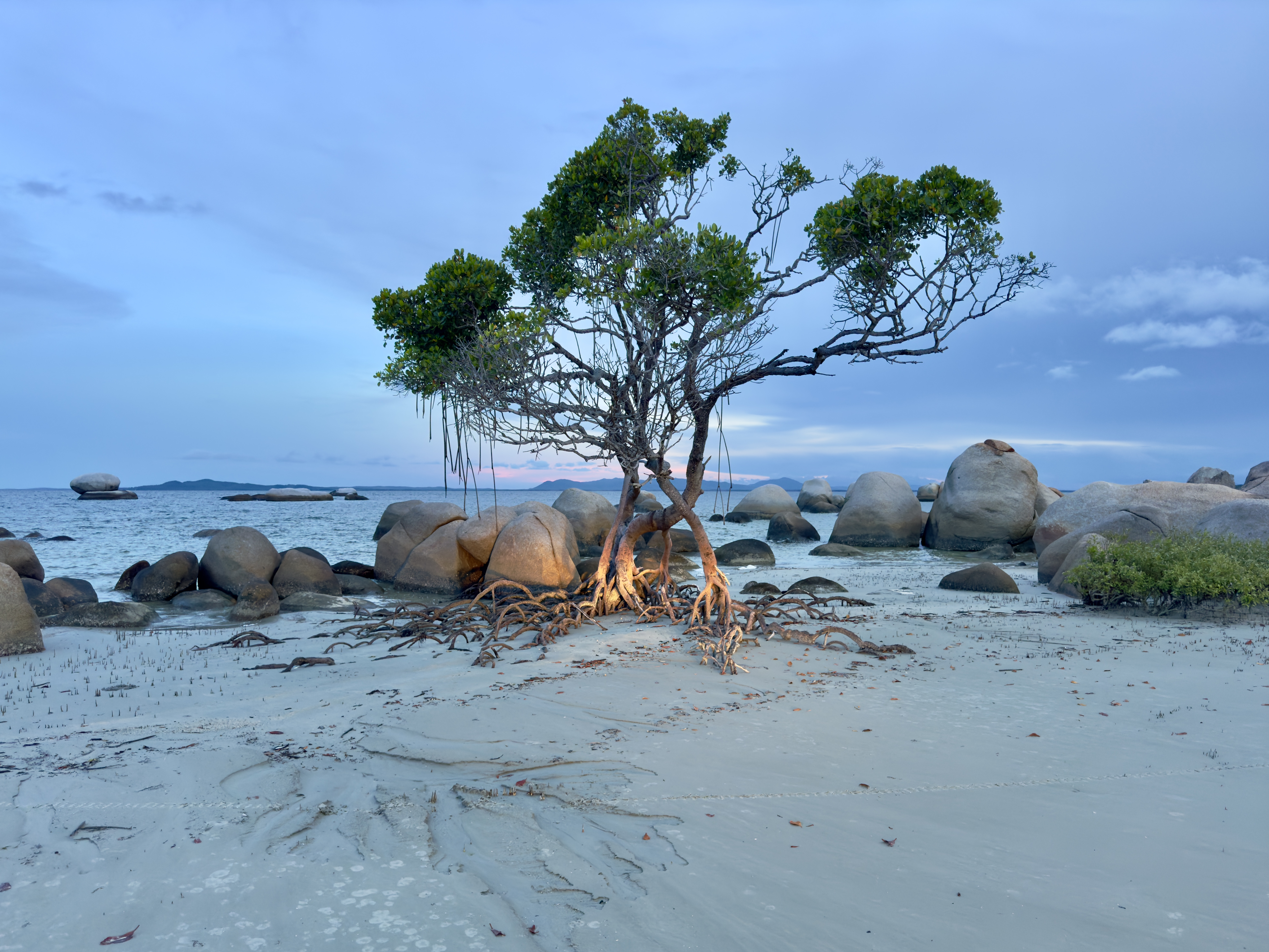
- Blue hour at Quintell Beach, Lockhart River, 2025

- Interactive map of Lockhart River
- Coordinates: 12.7851°S 143.3430°E
- Country: Australia
- State: Queensland
- LGAs: Aboriginal Shire of Lockhart River; Shire of Cook
- Location: 268 km (167 mi) E of Weipa; 596 km (370 mi) NNW of Cooktown; 765 km (475 mi) NNW of Cairns; 2,529 km (1,571 mi) NNW of Brisbane

Government
  - State electorate: Cook
  - Federal division: Leichhardt

Area
  - Total: 5,877.0 km^{2} (2,269.1 sq mi)
- Elevation: 17 m (56 ft)

Population
  - Total: 640 (2021 census)
  - Density: 0.1089/km^{2} (0.2820/sq mi)
- Postcode: 4892
- Mean max temp: 29.8 °C (85.6 °F)
- Mean min temp: 21.9 °C (71.4 °F)
- Annual rainfall: 2,117.4 mm (83.36 in)
Localities around Lockhart River
Wenlock	Shelburne	Iron Range
Archer River	Lockhart River	Coral Sea
Coen	Coen	Coral Sea

Lockhart River is a town in the Aboriginal Shire of Lockhart River and a coastal locality split between the Aboriginal Shire of Lockhart River and the Shire of Cook, on the Cape York Peninsula in Queensland, Australia. The town is an Aboriginal community. From 1924 to 1967, the Lockhart River Mission was run by the Anglican Church. In the 2021 census, the locality of Lockhart River had a population of 640 people.

== Geography ==
Lockhart River is a coastal Aboriginal community situated on the eastern coast of the Cape York Peninsula in Queensland, Australia. The population consists mostly of Aboriginal and Torres Strait Islanders, whose ancestors were forcibly moved to the area beginning in 1924.

The locality includes a number of islands off the east coast: Chapman Island, Lloyd Island, Rocky Island, Sherrard Island, and Sunter Island (all of which are in the Aboriginal Shire of Lockhart River).

== History ==
=== Early European history ===
Lockhart River takes its name from the river located 14 kilometres (8.7 mi) south of the community. The river was named by explorer Robert Logan Jack in January 1880, after a close friend, Hugh Lockhart.

Non-Indigenous people first arrived in 1848, when the explorer Edmund Kennedy set up a base camp near the mouth of the Pascoe River at Weymouth Bay. Kennedy left eight men at the camp but by the time they were located by the supply ship, only two remained alive, the other six having died from disease and starvation.

By the 1870s, fishermen with luggers looking for trepang, pearl shell, and trochus were in the coastal areas. Miners in search of tin and gold, along with timber cutters, were in the hills around Gordon Creek and the country inland around the Wenlock River.

=== Lockhart River Mission (1924–1967) ===
The Anglican Church established a mission at Orchid Point near the Lockhart River in 1924, at a location that had been a centre of a sandalwood trade. Aboriginal people came and were collected from parts of the Cape York Peninsula and placed at the mission, known as the Lockhart River Mission, Old Lockhart River Mission, or just Lockhart Mission. Six months later, the mission was relocated to Bare Hill, south of Cape Direction. In the 1930s, Lamalama people were forcibly relocated to the mission from the Port Stewart area, but they later returned. In 1939, many people who had earlier been removed from Coen to the mission, returned to the Coen area.

Lockhart State School opened on 1 January 1924.

Iron Range Post Office opened on 5 November 1936, closed in 1942, reopened in 1950, and was renamed Lockhart River in 1978.

After the Second World War broke out, the European superintendent went on furlough in 1942, and the Aboriginal people were told to go to several bush camps and fend for themselves. After six months, in July 1942, the mission was reopened but with poor resources and a lack of funding. Things improved under superintendent John Warby in the 1950s. A cooperative society was created in 1954 by the Rev. Alf Clint for the management of the trochus shell industry, until the market failed. New houses were built and a village was created on the ocean side.

During World War II, Lockhart River Airport was constructed as a large American bomber base with three airstrips operating. The US bombers flew to Papua New Guinea and were met by their fighter escorts based at Bamaga and Horn Island further north. Many thousands of troops, both US and Australian, passed through as part of their jungle training before being shipped to southeast Asia, and many sorties from the base were flown against Japanese forces during the critical Battle of the Coral Sea, 4–8 May 1942. Portland Roads community, 40 kilometres (25 mi) north of Lockhart River, was the supply port for the war effort with a large jetty. This jetty has since been removed. Many old bunkers and rusting 44 gallon drums can still be found in bush areas.

St James' Anglican Church was built circa 1953 from timber (approx 12.959498°S 143.507°E).

In March 1959, bushman Michael 'Tarzan' Fomenko paused at the Lockhart River Mission on his journey via dugout canoe from Queensland to Thursday Island, and was "cared for by the missionaries and staff members" of the facility.

In 1967, the church handed over the mission to the Queensland government, which tried to relocate the people to Bamaga. Most of the people refused to go. In 1968–1969, the people were relocated from the traditional area of the Uutaalnganu people on the coast to a new site in Kuuku Ya'u country, further north and inland from Quintel Beach. This move and the assimilation policy of the new administration resulted in much discontent and friction.

== Post-mission era ==
The Lockhart River Community was given Deed of Grant in Trust (DOGIT) title to the lands in 1987. Locally elected councillors now provide administration for the Lockhart River DOGIT.

Circa 1974, a new brick St James' Anglican Church was built in Liway Street.

On 7 May 2005, a Fairchild Aircraft Inc. SA227-DC Metro 23 aircraft, registered VH-TFU, with two pilots and 13 passengers, was being operated by Transair on an instrument flight rules regular public transport service from Bamaga to Cairns, with an intermediate stop at Lockhart River, Queensland. At 1143:39 Eastern Standard Time, the aircraft impacted terrain in the Kutini-Payamu National Park on the north-western slope of South Pap, a heavily timbered ridge, approximately 11 kilometres (6.8 mi) north-west of the Lockhart River aerodrome. At the time of the accident, the crew was conducting an area navigation global navigation satellite system (GNSS) nonprecision approach to runway 12. The aircraft was destroyed by the impact forces and an intense, fuel-fed, post-impact fire. There were no survivors.

On 11 April 2014, the former locality of Lockhart was split into two new localities: Iron Range and Lockhart River.

== Governance ==
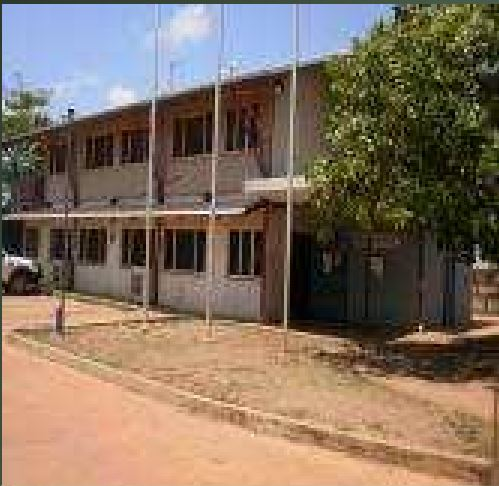
Shire office, Lockhart River, 2024

Lockhart River is both a town located in the Aboriginal Shire of Lockhart River and a coastal locality split between the Aboriginal Shire of Lockhart River and the Shire of Cook.

== Climate ==
Lockhart River has a tropical savannah climate (Köppen: Aw), with an oppressive wet season between November and May and a dry season from June and October with somewhat cooler temperatures and lower humidity. Temperatures remain warm to hot year-round, with average maxima varying from 27.2 °C (81.0 °F) in July to 32.3 °C (90.1 °F) in December. Due to its average annual rainfall of 2,074.9 mm (81.69 in), Lockhart River only has 36.4 clear days annually. Extreme temperatures have ranged from 40.2 °C (104.4 °F) on 19 November 1990 to 3.3 °C (37.9 °F) on 20 July 1965.

Climate data for Lockhart River (12º47'24"S, 143º18'00"E, 19 m AMSL) (1965-2024 normals and extremes, rainfall to 1956)
Month	Jan	Feb	Mar	Apr	May	Jun	Jul	Aug	Sep	Oct	Nov	Dec	Year
Record high °C (°F)	38.0 (100.4)	37.0 (98.6)	36.0 (96.8)	34.3 (93.7)	33.6 (92.5)	31.6 (88.9)	31.9 (89.4)	32.0 (89.6)	35.2 (95.4)	37.7 (99.9)	40.2 (104.4)	39.8 (103.6)	40.2 (104.4)
Mean daily maximum °C (°F)	31.8 (89.2)	31.5 (88.7)	30.7 (87.3)	29.9 (85.8)	28.8 (83.8)	27.5 (81.5)	27.2 (81.0)	27.8 (82.0)	29.1 (84.4)	30.5 (86.9)	31.9 (89.4)	32.3 (90.1)	29.9 (85.8)
Mean daily minimum °C (°F)	23.8 (74.8)	23.8 (74.8)	23.6 (74.5)	23.1 (73.6)	22.1 (71.8)	20.4 (68.7)	19.6 (67.3)	19.4 (66.9)	20.6 (69.1)	22.0 (71.6)	23.2 (73.8)	23.7 (74.7)	22.1 (71.8)
Record low °C (°F)	18.9 (66.0)	19.5 (67.1)	18.2 (64.8)	15.4 (59.7)	11.5 (52.7)	10.6 (51.1)	3.3 (37.9)	9.5 (49.1)	10.6 (51.1)	11.1 (52.0)	13.4 (56.1)	17.7 (63.9)	3.3 (37.9)
Average precipitation mm (inches)	401.5 (15.81)	377.8 (14.87)	446.3 (17.57)	301.1 (11.85)	99.5 (3.92)	57.9 (2.28)	41.1 (1.62)	28.3 (1.11)	15.1 (0.59)	27.8 (1.09)	68.5 (2.70)	208.6 (8.21)	2,074.9 (81.69)
Average precipitation days (≥ 1.0 mm)	19.3	18.9	19.6	14.8	11.9	10.1	8.9	6.3	3.4	3.1	5.5	11.6	133.4
Average afternoon relative humidity (%)	74	76	76	73	73	72	69	66	63	61	63	67	69
Average dew point °C (°F)	23.9 (75.0)	24.1 (75.4)	23.9 (75.0)	22.9 (73.2)	22.0 (71.6)	20.5 (68.9)	19.5 (67.1)	19.1 (66.4)	19.7 (67.5)	20.4 (68.7)	21.9 (71.4)	23.1 (73.6)	21.8 (71.2)
Source: Bureau of Meteorology (1965-2024 normals and extremes, rainfall to 1956)

== Demographics ==
In the 2006 census, the town of Lockhart River had a population of 542 people with 484 (89.3%) identifying as Indigenous.

In the 2011 census, the town of Lockhart River had a population of 463 people with 422 (90.6%) identifying as Indigenous.

In the 2016 census, the locality of Lockhart River had a population of 724 people with 629 (86.8%) identifying as Indigenous.

In the 2021 census, the locality of Lockhart River had a population of 640 people with 502 (78.4%) identifying as Indigenous.

== Education ==
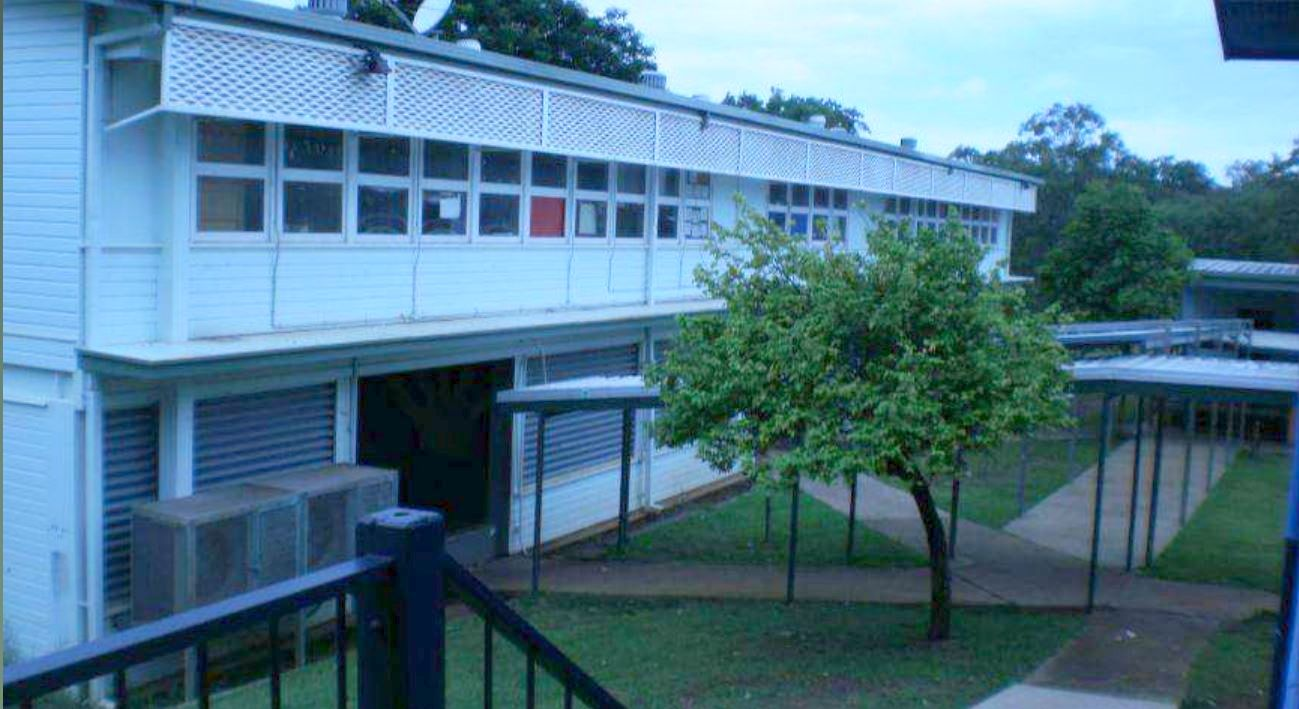
Teaching block B, Lockhart State School, 2024

Lockhart State School is a government primary and secondary (Early Childhood to Year 12) school for boys and girls at Puchewoo Street (12.7854°S 143.3441°E). In 2017, the school had an enrolment of 97 students with 14 teachers and 1 non-teaching staff. It includes a special education programme.

== Amenities ==
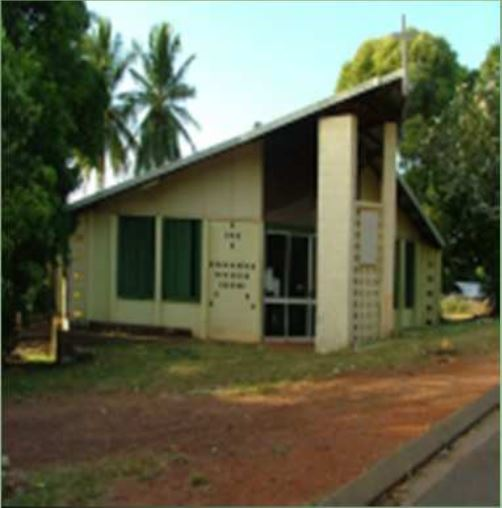
St James' Anglican Church, 2024

The Lockhart River Aboriginal Shire Council operates an Indigenous Knowledge Centre, which includes a library, on Poucheewee Street.

St James' Anglican Church is in Liway Street (12.786027°S 143.343°E).

There is a boat ramp into the Claudie River approx 4.8 kilometres (3.0 mi) south of the Lockhart River town (12.8238°S 143.3453°E). It is managed by the Lockhart River Aboriginal Shire Council.

== Facilities ==
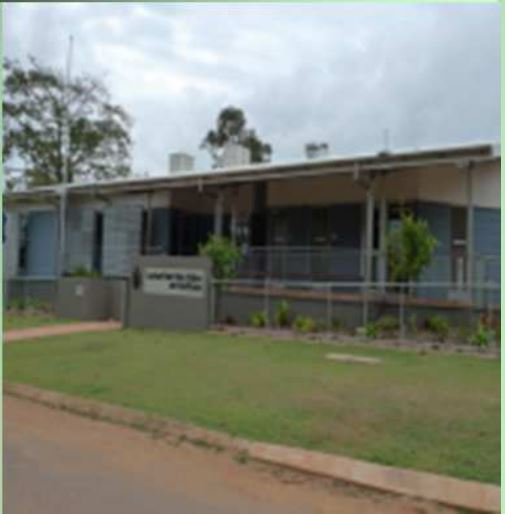
Police station, Lockhart River, 2024

Lockhart River Airport (also known as Iron Range Airport) is on Lockhart River Road, 4.7 kilometres (2.9 mi) west of the town (12.7867°S 143.3051°E). It has a 1,500 metres (4,900 ft) sealed all-weather runway with pilot-activated lights for 24 hour use. It provides access to the town during the wet season when roads are often closed due to flood water.

The port at Quintell Beach has a barge facility from the beach into the Coral Sea 2 kilometres (1.2 mi) SSE of the town (12.7947°S 143.3600°E). It serves the Lockhart River community and nearby pastoral stations. It is operated by Ports North.

Lockhart River Police Station is in Piiramo Street (12.7879°S 143.3439°E).

Lockhart River Primary Health Care Centre is at 2 Paytham Street (12.7859°S 143.3437°E).

== Notable people ==
- Rosella Namok, artist

== See also ==
- Skytrans Airlines
