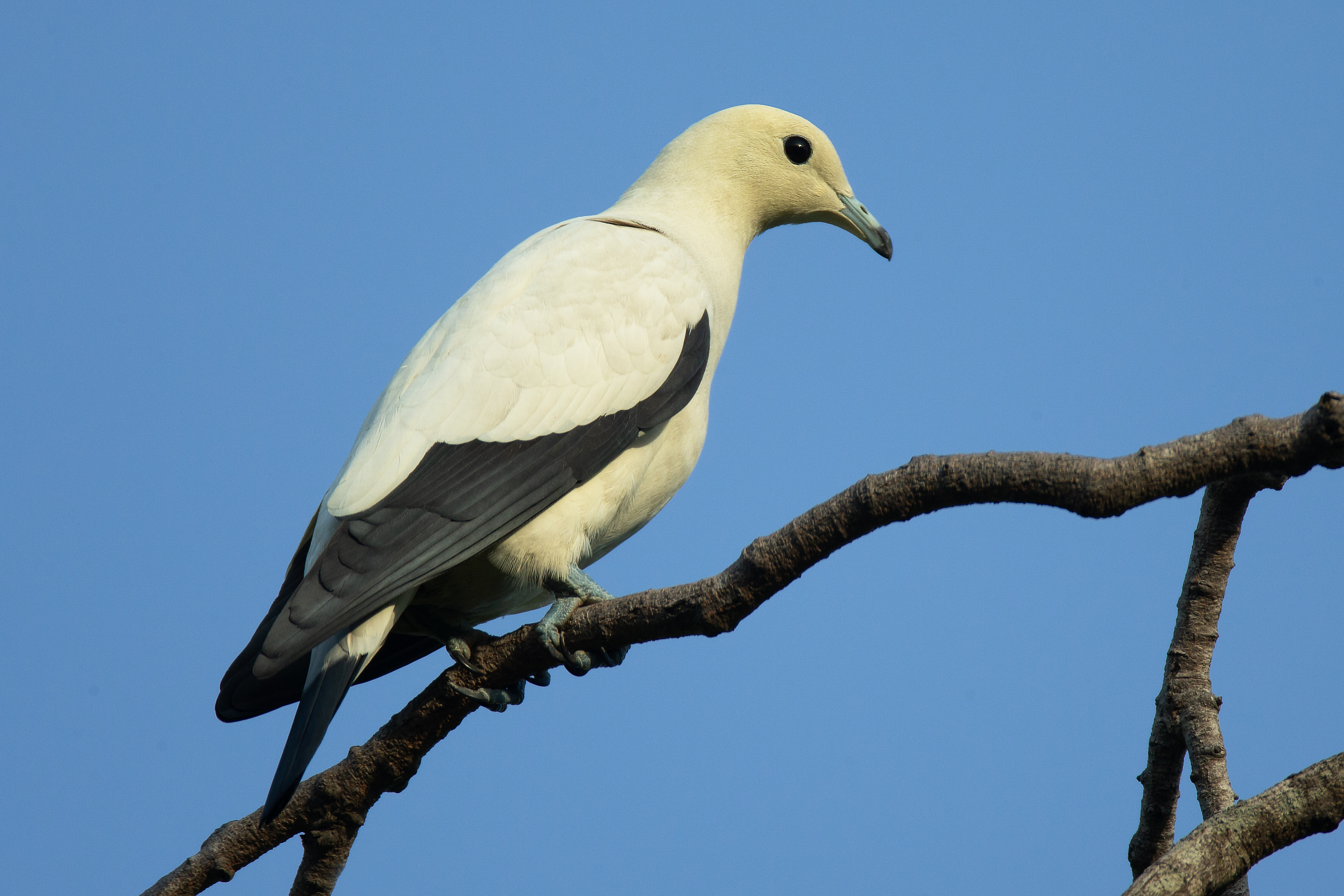
- Pied imperial pigeon in Singapore.

Conservation status
- Least Concern (IUCN 3.1)

Scientific classification
- Kingdom: Animalia
- Phylum: Chordata
- Class: Aves
- Order: Columbiformes
- Family: Columbidae
- Genus: Ducula
- Species: D. bicolor

Binomial name
- Ducula bicolor (Scopoli, 1786)

= Pied imperial pigeon =

Species of bird

The pied imperial pigeon (Ducula bicolor) is a relatively large, pied species of pigeon. It is found in forest, woodland, mangrove, plantations and scrub in Southeast Asia, ranging from Myanmar and Thailand, throughout Indonesia and east to the Philippines (where it is locally known as camasu and balud-puti) and the Bird's Head Peninsula in New Guinea. It is mainly found on small islands and in coastal regions. It remains locally common, and is therefore considered to be of least concern by BirdLife International and IUCN.

== Taxonomy ==
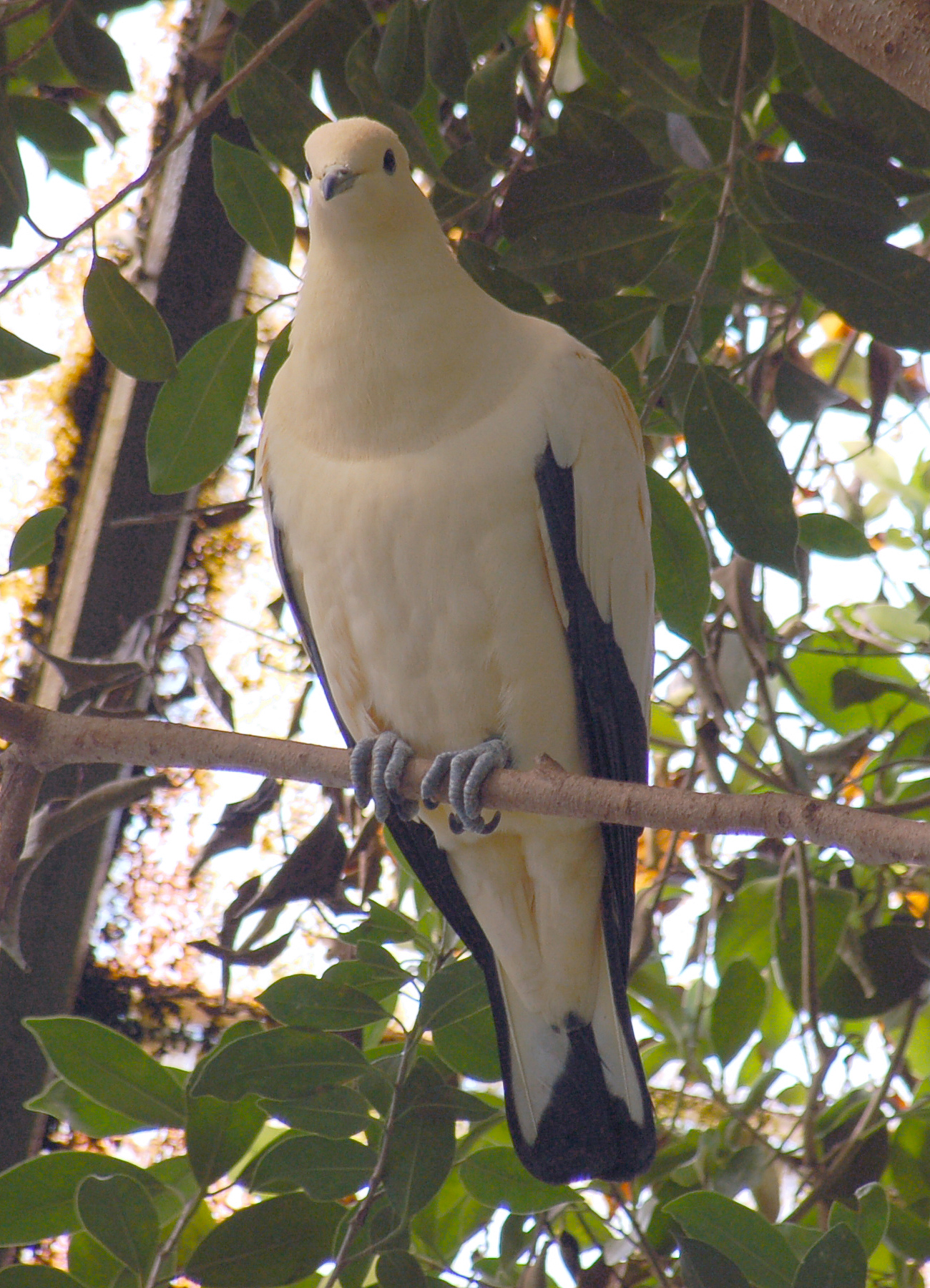
Pied imperial pigeon at the National Aviary. Notice the lack of black spotting to the undertail coverts.

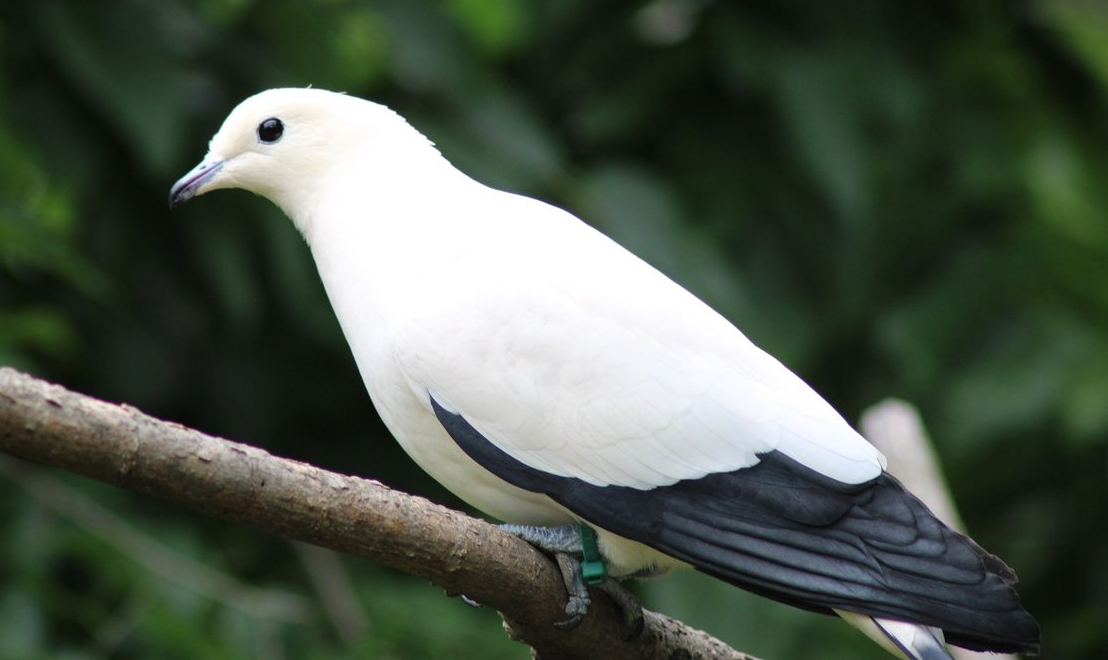
Pied imperial pigeon at the Kansas City Zoo and Aquarium

Its taxonomy is confusing and remains unsettled. It has sometimes included the Torresian, yellowish and silver-tipped imperial pigeons as subspecies. The widespread nominate subspecies of the pied imperial pigeon differs from all these by its plain white thighs and undertail coverts (though often with a dark spot at the very tip), and its narrowly dark-tipped bluish bill. For comparison, the other species' have black-spotted undertail coverts and thighs (spotting mainly near thighs in silver-tipped imperial pigeon), the bill of the Torresian imperial pigeon is greenish-yellow, and the bills of the yellowish and silver-tipped imperial pigeons are bluish at the base and yellowish at the tip. Furthermore, the yellowish imperial pigeon has a distinctive yellowish tinge to its plumage (some pied imperial pigeons may also appear yellowish, but infrequently to the same extent), and the silver-tipped imperial pigeon has silvery-grey remiges. However, the subspecies D. b. melanura of the Moluccas, which usually is considered a subspecies of the pied imperial pigeon, resembles the Torresian imperial pigeon in bill, thighs and undertail coverts, but has a significantly broader black tail-tip. Consequently, some have suggested it should be placed under the Torresian imperial pigeon, while others have suggested it should be considered an entirely separate species, D. melanura (for which the name black imperial pigeon has been used – an unfortunate choice, as only the tail has significantly more black than the other members of this group, and the name black imperial pigeon usually has been used for D. melanochroa). Yet others have considered melanura to be invalid, instead believing it only is a morph of D. b. bicolor, as both types can be found on some islands.
