= Kutini-Payamu (Iron Range) National Park =

National park in Australia

Kutini-Payamu National Park
- IUCN category II (national park)
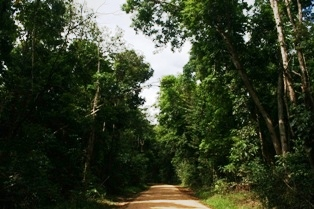
- Kutini-Payamu National Park

- Location within Queensland
- Location: Queensland
- Nearest city: Weipa
- Coordinates: 12°39′35″S 143°20′51″E
- Area: 346 km^{2} (134 sq mi)
- Established: 1977
- Governing body: Queensland Parks and Wildlife Service
- Website: Official website

Kutini-Payamu (Iron Range) is a National Park located in Queensland, Australia, 1,940 kilometres (1,210 mi) northwest of Brisbane and 100 kilometres (62 mi) east of Weipa in the Cape York Peninsula, Queensland. Within the National Park is the Iron Range (Lockhart River Resources Reserve), Scrubby Creek mining site and the Aboriginal Shire of Lockhart River. During World War II several Australian Army units were stationed in the area.

== Birds ==
The park is part of the 6,205 km^{2} McIlwraith and Iron Ranges an Important Bird Area (IBA), identified as such by BirdLife International because it is one of the few known sites for the endangered buff-breasted buttonquail. The IBA also supports an isolated population of southern cassowaries as well as populations of lovely fairywrens, silver-crowned friarbirds, yellow, yellow-spotted, white-streaked and banded honeyeaters, and white-browed robins. As well as these, the eclectus parrot subspecies Eclectus roratus macgillivrayi is confined to the Iron and McIlwraith Ranges of eastern Cape York Peninsula.

== Other Wildlife ==
The national park is a hotspot for flora and fauna, with over 1800 species recorded in the area. Notable species include the green tree python, spotted cuscus, bare-rumped sheathtail bat, and estuarine crocodile. The park represents one of the most diverse protected areas in Australia for butterflies, ants, ferns, orchids and palms. In fact, 60% of Australia's butterflies are found in Kutini-Payamu National Park. Making the area a popular tourist destination for wildlife enthusiasts.

== History ==
=== Airbases ===
In March 1940, Val Augenson of the Department of Civil Aviation inspected a possible site for an Emergency Landing Ground for the Royal Australian Air Force (RAAF). He reported to the RAAF that a suitable all-weather Emergency Landing Ground could be built in the area.

On about 18 April 1942, Walter Maiersperger, the Commanding Officer of 33 Bomb Squadron of the United States Army Air Forces 22nd Bomb Group, carried out an aerial reconnaissance flight over the Iron Range area. He had been tasked with surveying coastal airfields in Queensland that would be suitable for operation of the Martin B-26 Marauders used by the 22nd Bomb Group.

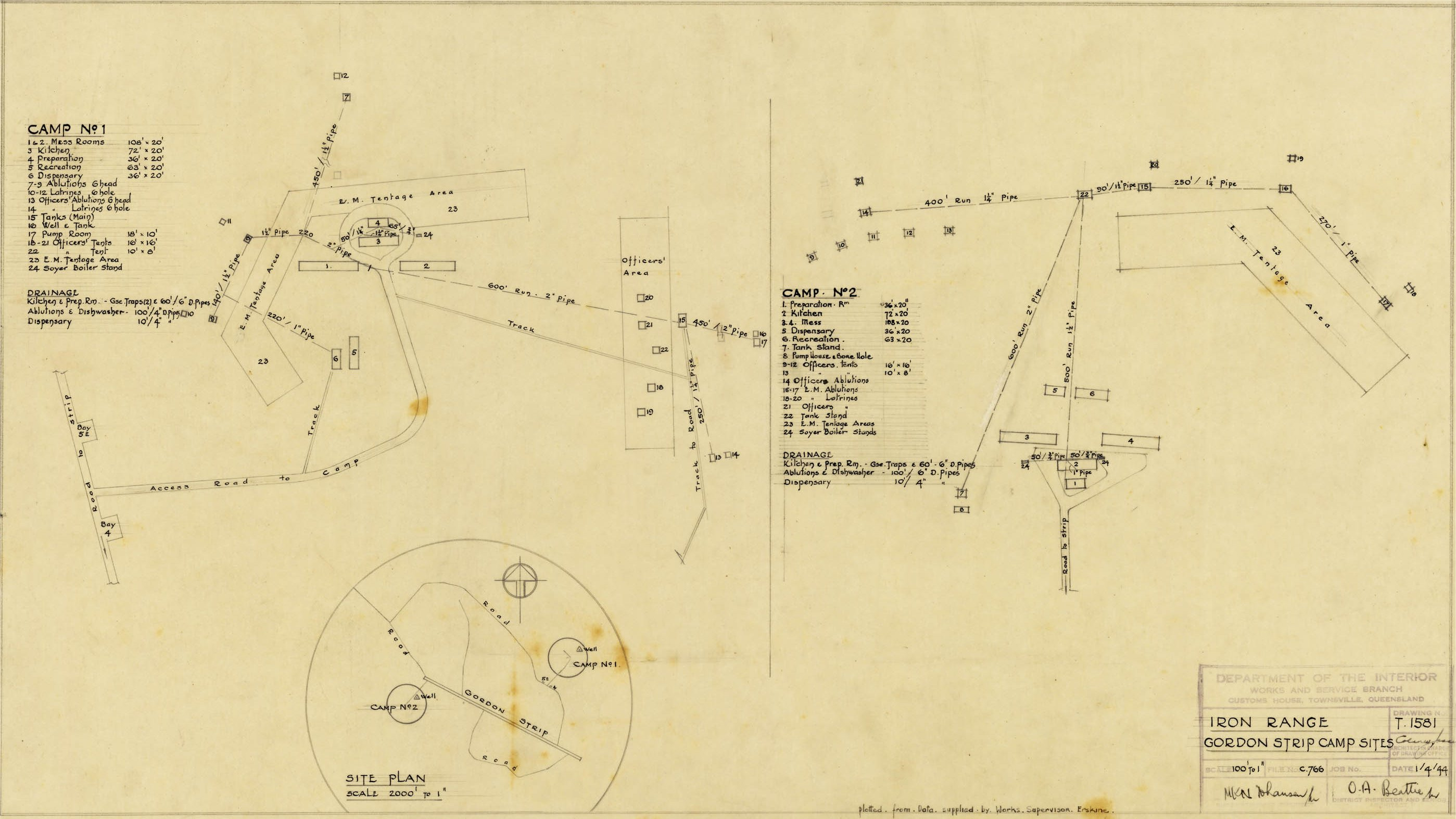
Plan of airbase. Circa 1942

Air Commodore Lukis, Air Officer Commanding, North East Area, reported on 28 May 1942, that Pilot Officer Trench, RAAF had inspected the countryside near Portland Roads (also known as Weymouth Bay), with Colonel Mills and Captain Herman G. Cox of the USAAF. Their first attempt to fly to the Iron Range area from Coen was not successful. An engine failed in their Rapide and they returned to Coen. After being repaired they took off the next morning and landed on a beach at low tide a few miles south of Portland Roads. As the plane slowed upon landing on the soft sand the Rapide swung towards the sea. The tips of the propeller started to thrash in the water but the skilful pilot was able to turn the aircraft back onto the beach.

The inspection party reported to Lukis that there were good jetty facilities at Portland Roads but that there was no suitable site for an aerodrome near the jetty. They reported that a fairly extensive site just to the west of Iron Range and east of the Claudie River was suitable for the construction of several airfields. On 7 June 1942, an advance party of the US 46 Engineer General Service Regiment and 26 Operational Base Unit RAAF boarded the SS Wandana in Townsville headed for Portland Roads. 26 OBU arrived at Portland Roads and established radio communications with Townsville on the evening of 10 June 1942.

A few weeks after his initial visit, Jim Trench returned to the Iron Range area with Colonel Mills and observed two American Battalions of Pioneer Engineers busily building the Iron Range runways. They managed to build two 7,000-feet runways and thirteen miles (21 kilometres) of sealed taxiways within three months. On 14 June 1942, Companies A, B and C of the 46th Engineers boarded the MS Dona Nati at Townsville and arrived at Portland Roads on 16 June 1942. Headquarters and Service Company (H & S Company) of the 46th Engineers left Townsville on 10 July 1942 and arrived at Portland Roads on 12 July 1942. On 27 October 1942, Headquarters Detachment of the 46th Engineers left Townsville and arrived at Iron Range on 29 October 1942. The 90th Bombardment Group arrived in Queensland in early November 1942 with their forty-eight (48) Consolidated B-24D Liberators (variant D). They were initially based as follows at Iron Range, 16 km inland from the port facility of Portland Roads:

=== Sections and units during World War II ===
According to Peter Dunn, the following sections were situated at Iron Range:

- 2 Section, 2 Australian Survey Company
- 3rd Portable Surgical Hospital (US Army)
- 5th AACS
- 13 Garrison Battalion 1 Aust Army, CMF
- 13 Australian Gun (less A, B & C Company)
- 15th Weather Squadron
- 18th Station Hospital (US)
- 18th Station Hospital (US)
- 22nd Bomb Group
- 26th AA Battery
- 26 OBU (RAAF)
- 28 Service Squadron (US)
- 36 Australian AA Battery Workshops Section, Cape Direction
- 36 Australian Supply Depot Pl
- 43rd Bomb Group
- 46 Engineer Regiment (US)
- 61 Service Group & 46 (EGS)
- 90th Bomb Group
- 197th Coastal Artillery (AA) Regiment
- 387th Port Battalion (US)
- 404 Signal
- 1909 Ordnance
- AASC 4 Australian DID, Cape Direction
- Attached Detachment 200 Supply Depot (AIF)
- Australian 446–447 Heavy AA Gun Static
- Australian 136 Coastal Artillery Searchlight Company
- Australian Army Airway Radio Range and Communication Station
- Allied Works Council
- Carrier Pl, 51 Australian Infantry Battalion
- Civil Construction Corps (CCC)
- D Section, 2/4th Australian Dental Unit
- Detachment 1 Australian Army AA Pool Under Command CA Artillery Portland Roads
- Detachment 2/1 Australian Field Butchery Company
- Detachment 2/109 Australian General Transport Company
- Detachment 3 Company Queensland AA & CA Signals
- Detachment 8 Australian Field Baker
- Detachment 19 Australian Field Bakery
- Detachment 21 Australian Field Bakery (AIF)
- Detachment 56 Australian Comp. AA Regiment Workshop (LE)
- Directorate of Air Transport
- HQ 36 Australian AA Battery
- Main Roads Commission (MRC)
- Portland Road Battery
- Port Detachment "A"
- RAAF AASC Station Base and Weather Station
- RAAF Key Communication Centre
- US 5 Air Force Command

== See also ==
- Protected areas of Queensland
