= Cape Grenville =

Point in Queensland, Australia

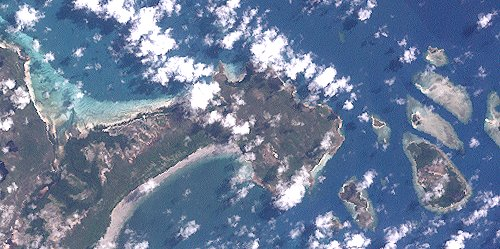
Satellite image, 2000

Cape Grenville (11°58′S 143°15′E), is a small, east-facing promontory along the Queensland, Australia coast of Cape York Peninsula. It lies between Shelburne Bay to the north and Temple Bay to the south. The nearest significant settlement is Weipa, along the western coast of Cape York.

The northern part of this cape forms the southern face of Margaret Bay, to the west of Shelburne Bay. Several small islands (known as the Home Islands) lie off the eastern coast, including Orton Island, Gore Island and Hicks Island. Along the southern side of the cape is Indian Bay.

About 90 kilometres (56 mi) to the east and northeast of Cape Grenville is the far northern management area of the Great Barrier Reef Marine Park.

Persistent winds have blown sand on-shore and inland for up to 29 kilometres (18 mi) at the cape. These parabolic dunes form Queensland's most extensive mainland transgressive dune system, slightly larger than those found at Cape Flattery.

The Wuthathi people are the traditional owners of the Cape Grenville region. They previously spoke the now extinct Wuthathi language. The Wuthathi Land Trust won control of "fifteen parcels of former Aboriginal reserve land, and land declared claimable under the Act on the Cape Grenville Reserve Islands and the Cape Grenville Unallocated State Land Islands of Rodney Island, Manley Island, Pig Island, Bootie Island, Sunday Island, Ethel Island and three un-named islands" which was granted under the Aboriginal Land Act 1991 (Qld).

On 29 April 2015 a large block of land, and surrounding waters, including Cape Grenville, were recognised by the Federal Court of Australia as belonging to the Wuthathi people:

". . . recognised the exclusive and nonexclusive native title rights and interests of the Wuthathi People over approximately 1181 square kilometres of land described at [4] as an ecologically sensitive and beautiful area around Shelburne Bay on the northern tip of Cape York Peninsula. Also, at [26] as lying wholly within the wider area of Wuthathi country, which extends along the coast to Captain Billy Landing in the north, extending southwards to south of the Olive River, and east to the Great Barrier Reef."

7304 hectares of wetlands on Cape Grenville have been listed as "nationally important wetlands" in the Directory of Important Wetlands (2001) 3rd Edition, Environment Australia.
