= List of islands of Australia =

This is a list of selected Australian islands grouped by state or territory. Australia has 8,222 islands within its maritime borders.

== Largest islands ==
=== By area ===
Australia is often referred to as an island continent as it is surrounded by ocean. Mainland Australia has a total area of 7,591,608 km^{2} (2,931,136 sq mi).

Fringing islands larger than 1,000 km^{2} (390 sq mi) are:

- Tasmania (Tas) 64,519 km^{2} (24,911 sq mi);
- Melville Island, Northern Territory (NT), 5,786 km^{2} (2,234 sq mi);
- Kangaroo Island, South Australia (SA), 4,416 km^{2} (1,705 sq mi);
- Groote Eylandt (NT), 2,285 km^{2} (882 sq mi);
- Bathurst Island (NT), 1,693 km^{2} (654 sq mi);
- K'gari, Queensland (Qld), 1,653 square kilometres (638 sq mi);
- Flinders Island (Tas), 1,359 km^{2} (525 sq mi);
- King Island (Tas), 1,091 km^{2} (421 sq mi); and
- Mornington Island (Qld), 1,002 km^{2} (387 sq mi).

=== By population ===
Apart from the state of Tasmania (with a population of 570,000), the largest islands by population are those connected to major urban areas on the mainland by bridge, including Bribie Island near Brisbane with a population of 18,000, and Phillip Island near Melbourne with a population of 14,000.

== New South Wales ==
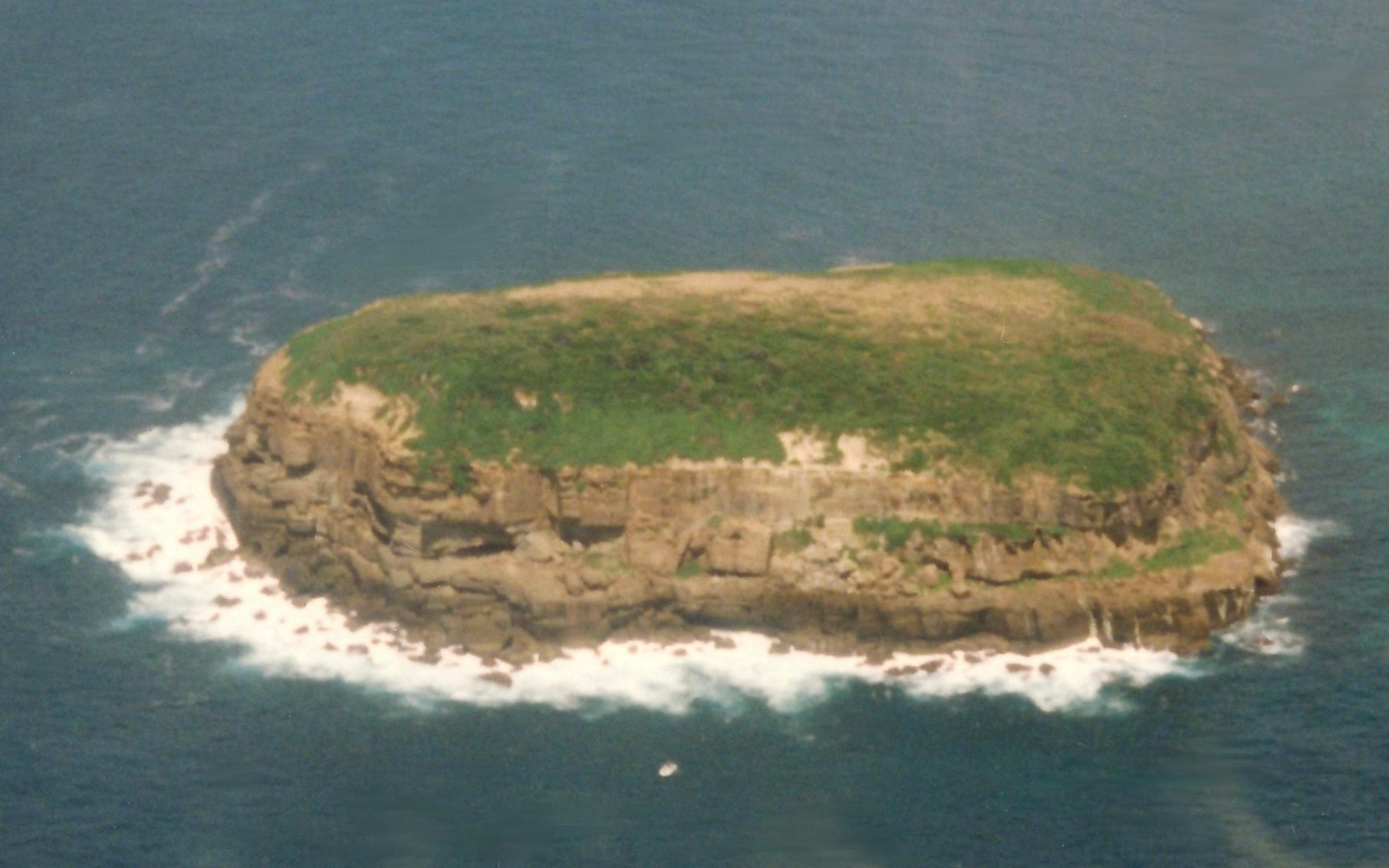
Bird Island, 1996

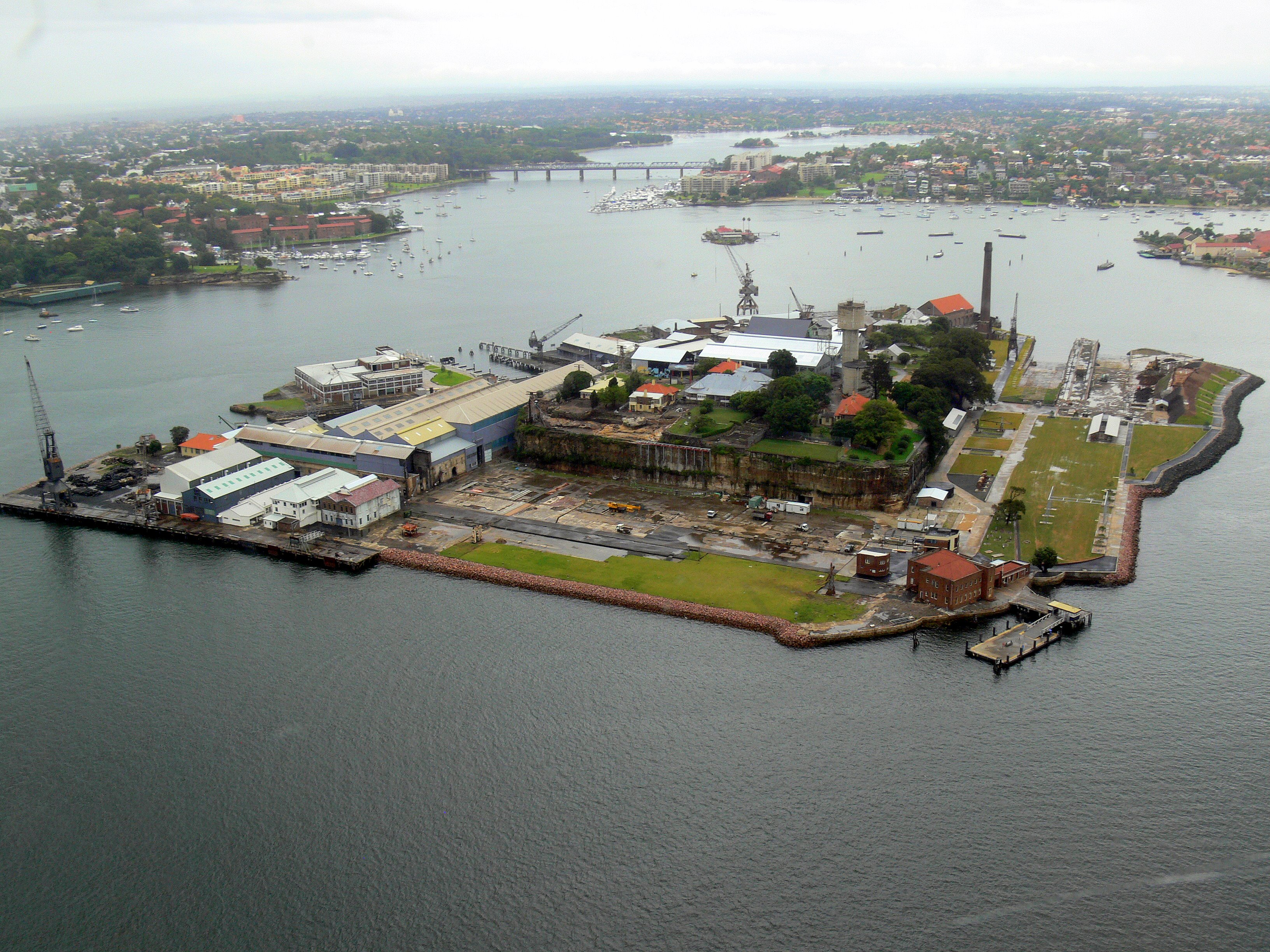
Cockatoo Island, the largest island in Sydney Harbour, 2008

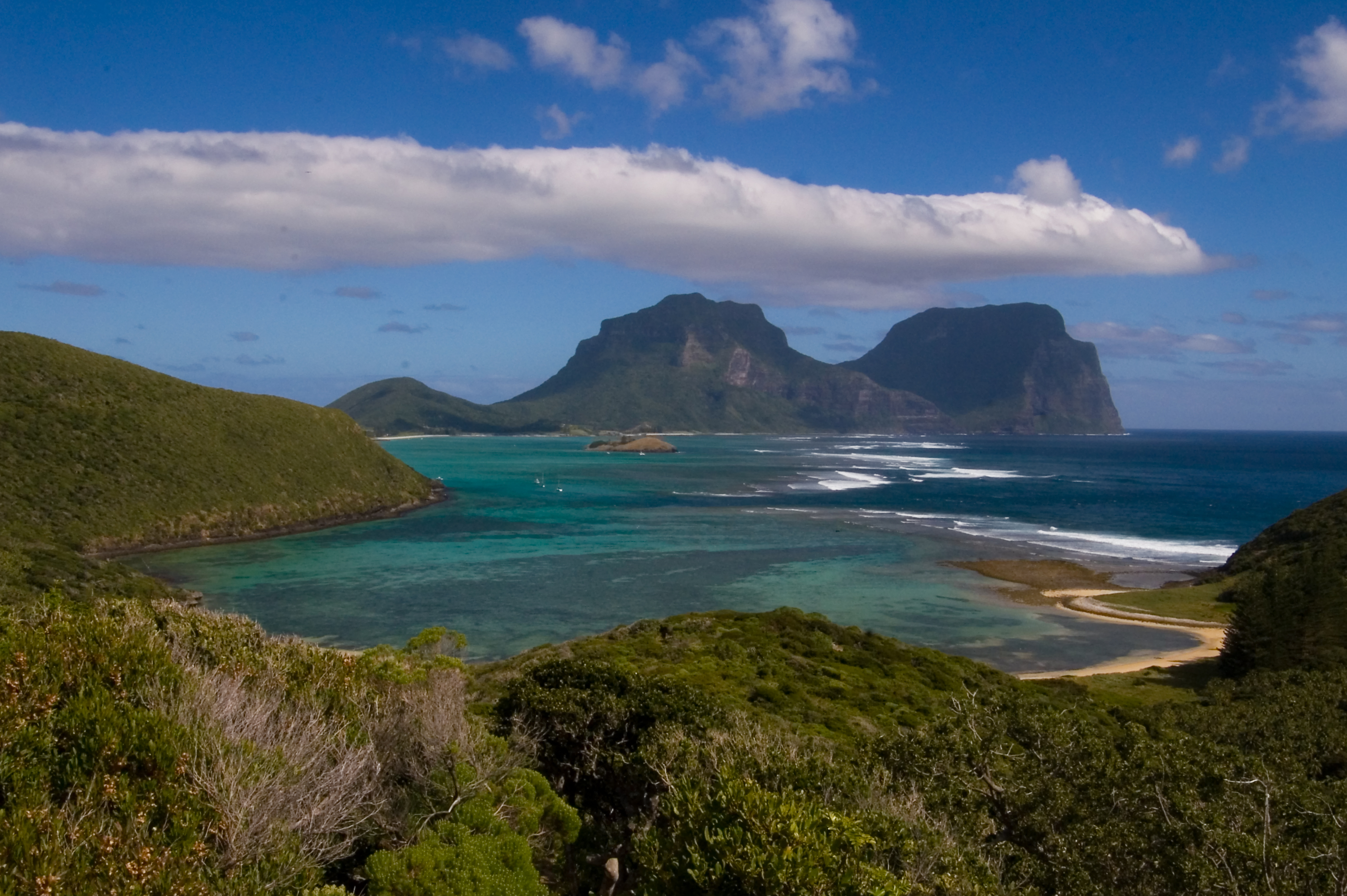
Lord Howe Island, 2006

- Amherst Island, in Lake Mummuga
- Ash Island, in the lower Hunter River
- Bare Island, near the north headland of Botany Bay
- Belowla Island, off Kioloa Beach
- Bird Island, located 1.4 kilometres (0.87 mi)

off Budgewoi, Central Coast

- Boondelbah Island, at the mouth of Port Stephens
- Brisbane Water:
  - Pelican Island
  - Riley's Island
  - St Hubert's Island (largely artificial, created by raising an inter-tidal wetland above high water level)
- Broughton Island, located north of Port Stephens
- Broulee Island, located off the coast at Broulee
- Brush Island, off Bawley Point
- Cabbage Tree Island, at the mouth of Port Stephens
- Cabbage Tree Island, in the Richmond River
- Carter's Island, in Botany Bay near the mouth of George's River
- Clarence River estuary:
  - Ashby Island
  - Chatsworth Island
  - Freeburn Island
  - Goodwood Island
  - Harwood Island
  - Micalo Island
  - Palmers Island
  - Thorny Island
  - Warregah Island
  - Yargai Island
- Clark Island, in Sydney Harbour
- Cockatoo Island, in Sydney Harbour, originally used as a prison and later developed as a shipyard
- Comerong Island, in the Shoalhaven River estuary
- Cook Island, located near Tweed Heads
- Crampton Island, off the mouth of Lake Tabourie
- Dalhunty Island, in Wilson River at Telegraph Point
- Dangar Island, a small forested island in the Hawkesbury River
- Darling Island, a former island subsequently bridged by land, part of Pyrmont, in Sydney Harbour
- Elizabeth Island, in the Clarence River near Grafton
- Esk Island, in the north arm of the Clarence River
- Fatima Island, a tidal island of the Cook's River
- Fattorini Island, in the Macleay River near Smithtown
- Fort Denison, also known as Pinchgut
- Five Islands Nature Reserve, a group of islands off the coast of Wollongong:
  - Bass Island
  - Big Island
  - Martin Island
  - Red Island
  - Tom Thumb Island
- Garden Island (no longer an island)
- Glebe Island (no longer an island)
- Goat Island, a rocky island in Sydney Harbour
- Green Island, a small island north of Smoky Cape
- Green Island, off the mouth of Lake Conjola
- Hexham Island, in the lower Hunter River
- Honeysuckle Island, in Wallaga Lake
- Horse Island, in Tuross Lake
- Joass Island, located in Little Swan Bay, Port Stephens
- Kurrajong Island, in the Shoalhaven estuary
- Lake Illawarra:
  - Berageree Island
  - Bevan's Island
  - Gooseberry Island
  - Hooka Island
  - Picnic Island
  - Cudgeree Island
- Kooragang Island, in the lower Hunter River
- Lake Eucumbene:
  - Grace Lea Island
  - Hallstrom Island
  - Heron Island
  - Teal Island
- Lion Island, in Broken Bay
- Little Rawdon Island, in Hastings River downstream of Wauchope
- Long Island, in the Hawkesbury River
- Lord Howe Island, a small oceanic island in the Tasman Sea, 600 kilometres (370 mi) east of the Australian mainland; it is the most remote island of Australia to not fall under external territory status
  - Ball's Pyramid
  - Admiralty Group
- Manning River estuary:
  - Cabbage Tree Island
  - Dumaresq Island
  - Mitchell's Island
  - Oxley Island
  - Coocumbac Island
- Merriman Island, in Wallaga Lake
- Milson Island, in the Hawkesbury River
- Montague Island, 9 kilometres (5.6 mi) east of Narooma on the south coast
- Moon Island, 1 km off Swansea Heads
- Muttonbird Island, off Coffs Harbour
- Newry Island, in the Kalang River near Urunga
- Numbaa Island, in the Shoalhaven River
- Payne's Island, in Wallaga Lake
- Peat Island, in the Hawkesbury River
- Pig Island, in the Shoalhaven River
- Pimlico Island, in Richmond River near Wardell
- Pinchgut - see Fort Denison, a former penal site and defensive facility in Sydney Harbour
- Pulbah Island, the largest island in Lake Macquarie
- Rawdon Island, in Hastings River downstream of Wauchope
- Reedy Island, in Tuross Lake
- Regatta Island, in Wallis Lake
- Rodd Island, a small island in Iron Cove, an arm of Port Jackson (Sydney Harbour)
- Sanctuary Island, in Narrabeen Lagoon
- Scotland Island, in Pittwater
- Shark Island, in Sydney Harbour
- Snapper Island, in Sydney Harbour
- Spectacle Island, in the Hawkesbury River
- Spectacle Island, in Sydney Harbour
- Solitary Islands
  - North Solitary Island
  - South Solitary Island
  - Southwest Solitary Island
  - Mid Solitary Island
  - Split Solitary Island
- Stott's Island, in Tweed River at Tumbuulgum
- Stuart's Island, in Nambucca River at Bellwood
- Sultan's Island off coast 4 km north of Eden
- Susan Island, in Clarence River at Grafton
- Teribah Island, at The Entrance, Tuggerah Lake
- Tollgate Islands (2), in Bateman's Bay
- Ukerebagh Island, in Tweed River at South Tweed Heads
- Wallis Island, in Wallis Lake
- Wasp Island, the only island in Durras Inlet near Batemans Bay
- Wedding Cake Island, a small island off the coast of Coogee
- Windang Island, a small island at the entrance to Lake Illawarra
- Woodford Island, in the Clarence River immediately upstream of Maclean
- Yellow Rock Island, at junction of Bellinger and Kalang Rivers near Urunga

== Northern Territory ==
- Bathurst Island
- Bickerton Island
- Bruney Island
- Crocodile Islands
- Croker Island
- East Woody Island
- Elcho Island
- Goulburn Islands
- Groote Eylandt - The name is an archaic spelling of the Dutch words for "Big Island" - Australia's 4th largest island
- Howard Island
- Inglis Island
- Marchinbar Island
- Martjanba Island
- Melville Island, the second largest island in Australia
- Quail Island
- Sir Edward Pellew Group
- Tiwi Islands
- Vanderlin Island
- Wessel Islands

== Queensland ==
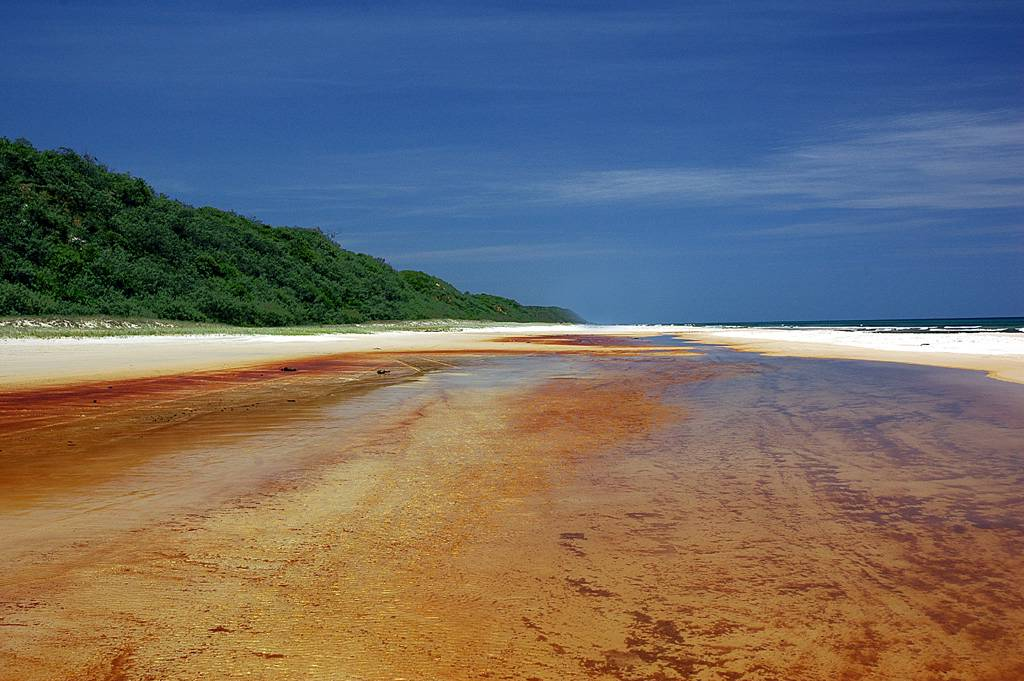
K'gari, 2006

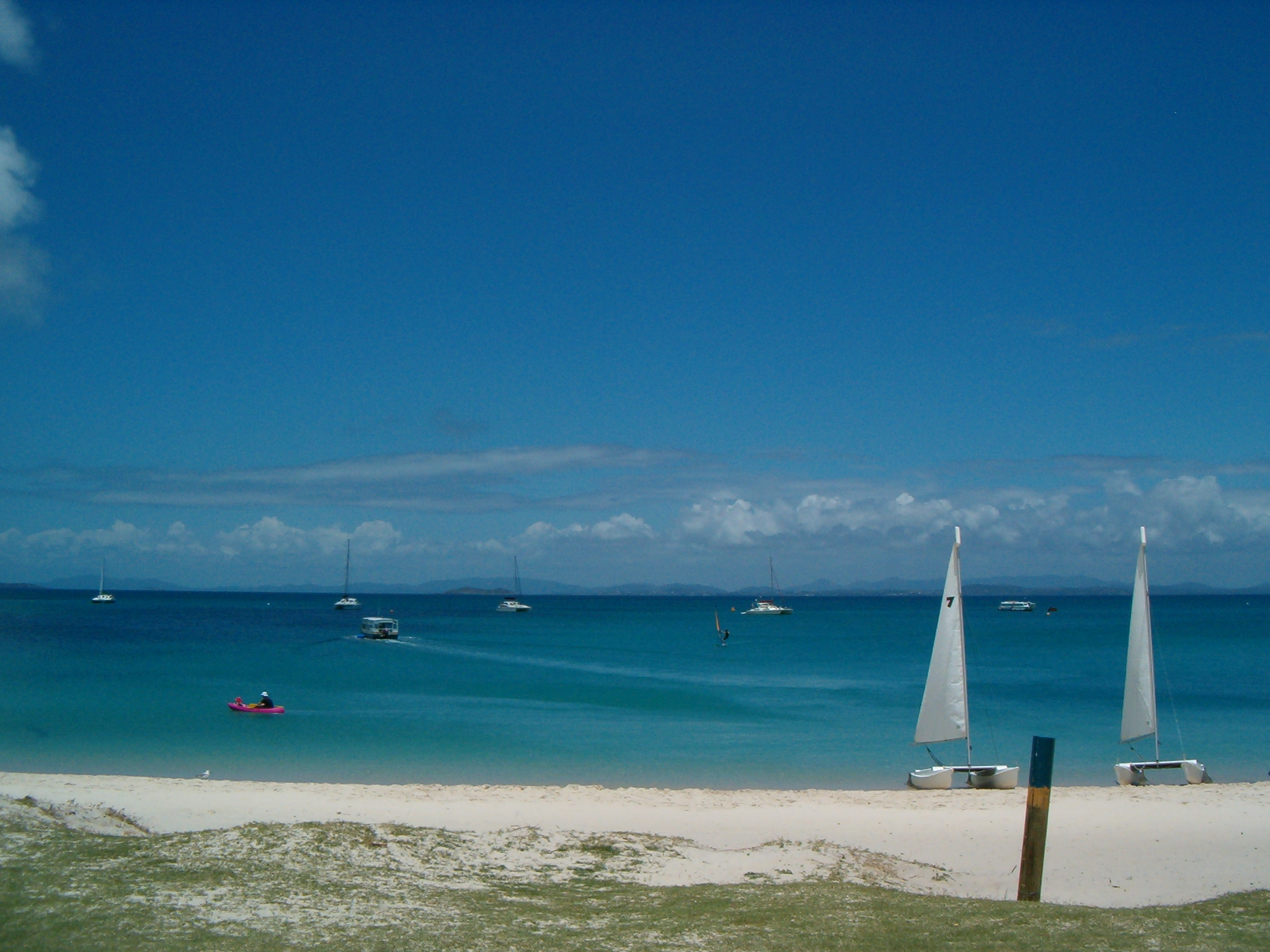
Great Keppel Island, 2007

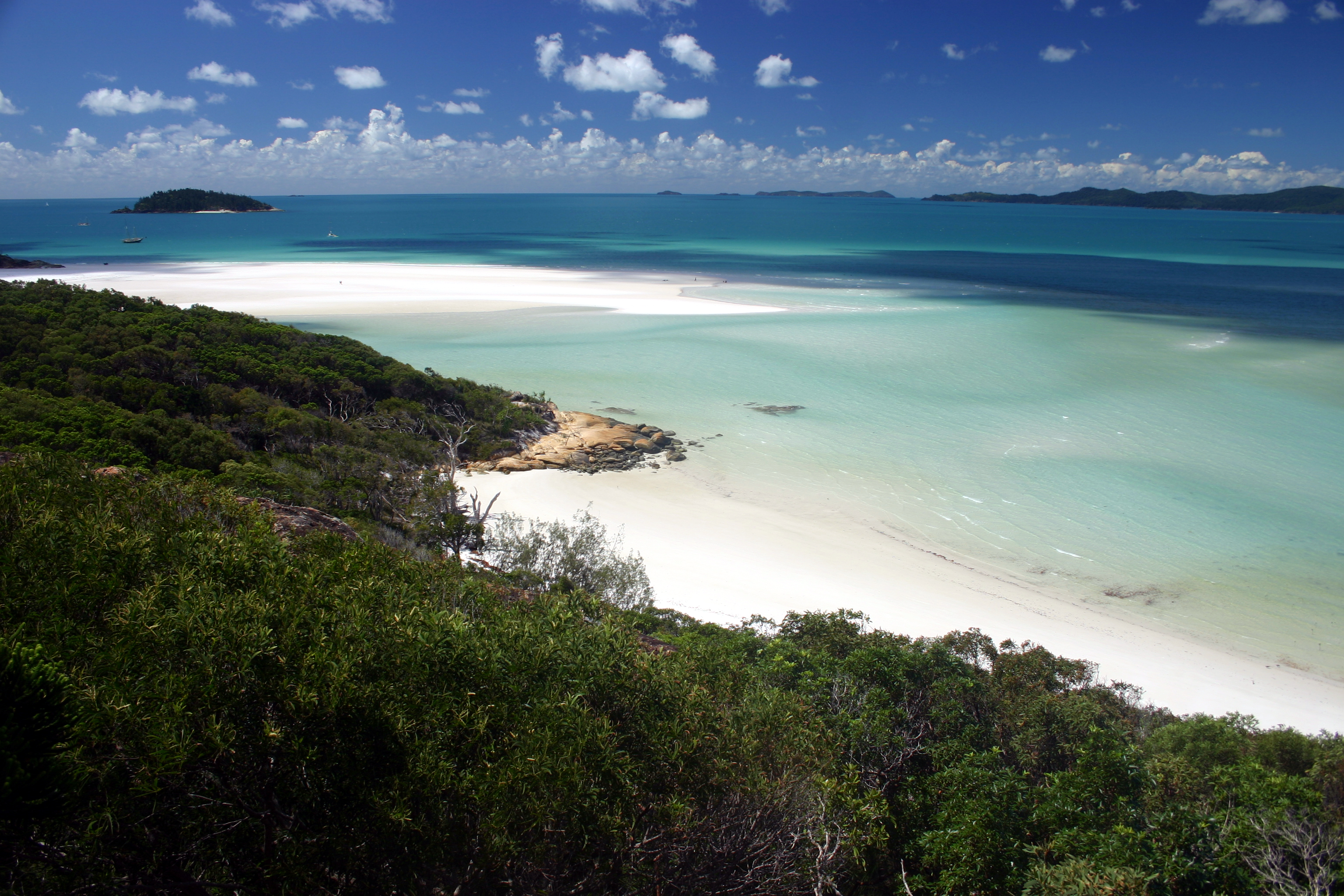
Whitehaven Beach, Whitsunday Island, 2008

- Acheron Island
- Agnes Island
- Albino Rock
- Aplin Islet
- Arnold Islets
- Avoid Island
- Baird Island
- Barber Island
- Barrow Island
- Bayley Island
- Bedarra Island
- Beesley Island
- Bentinck Island
- Bird Islands
- Bishop Island
- Bootie Island
- Bountiful Islands
- Bowden Island
- Boyne Island
- Brampton Island
- Bribie Island
- Brisk Island
- Brook Islands, three islands: North, Tween and Middle.
- Bourke Isles
- Bushy Island
- Bushy Islet
- Cholmondeley Islet
- Clack Island
- Clerke Island
- Coconut Island
- Coochiemudlo Island
- Crab Island
- Cordelia Rocks
- Coquet Island
- Curacoa Island
- Denham Island, Cape York Peninsula
- Denham Island, Wellesley Islands
- Douglas Islet
- Duncan Islands
- Dunk Island
- Eagle Island
- Ellis Island
- Ephraim Island
- Esk Island
- Eclipse Island
- Fantome Island
- Falcon Island
- Fisher Island
- Fisherman Island
- Fitzroy Island
- Fly Island
- Frankland Islands
  - Russell Island
- K'gari, the largest sand island in the world
- Gebar Island
- Goold Island
- Gore Island
- Great Keppel Island
- Great Palm Island
- Green Island
- Haggerston Island
- Hales Island
- Hannibal Islands
- Harvey Island
- Heron Island
- High Island
- Hinchinbrook Island
- Horseshoe Island
- Houghton Island
- Hudson Island
- Jessie Island
- Kangaroo Island
- Kent Island
- King Island
- Kumboola Island
- Lady Elliot Island
- Lady Musgrave Island
- Leggatt Island
- Lindquist Island
- Lizard Island
- Lloyd Island
- Low Island
- Low Wooded Island
- Mabel Island
- Makepeace Island
- Magnetic Island
- Milman Islet
- Moreton Island
- Mornington Island
- Morris Island
- Mudjimba Island
- Murdock Island
- Nigger Head
- Newton Island
- Nob Island
- Noble Island
- Normanby Island
- North Direction Island
- North Stradbroke Island
- Northumberland Islands
  - Bedwell Group
  - Beverley Group
  - Broad Sound Islands
  - Duke Islands
  - Flat Isles
  - Guardfish Cluster
  - Percy Isles
- Orpheus Island
- Paddy Island
- Pains Island
- Palfrey Island
- Peel Island
- Pelorus Island
- Pentecost Island
- Percy Island
- Perry Island
- Pigeon Island
- Pincushion Island
- Pipon Island
- Prince of Wales Island
- Pumpkin Island
- Raine Island
- Restoration Island
- Rocky Island
- Rocky Point Island
- Rodney Island
- Round Island
- St Helena Island
- Shaw Island
- Sherrard Island
- Sir Charles Hardy Islands
- The Sisters
- Sisters Islands
- Snapper Island
- South Direction Island
- South Stradbroke Island
- Southern Moreton Bay Islands
  - Russell Island
  - Macleay Island
  - Perulpa Island (connected to Macleay Island by causeway)
  - Lamb Island
  - Karragarra Island
- Saibai Island, in the Torres Strait
- Stapleton Island
- Stephens Island
- Struck Island
- Sunday Island
- Sunter Island
- Sweers Island
- Talbot Islands
- Tern Island
- Thomson Islet
- Thorpe Island
- Three Islands
- The Three Sisters
  - Sue Islet
- Torres Strait Islands
- Trochus Island
- Turtle Group
- Watson Island
- Wellesley Islands
  - North Wellesley Islands (Mornington, Moondalbee, Lingnoonganee, Pisonia, Lingeleah, Beahgoo, Jinke, Sydney, Tulburrerr, Denham, and Andrew Islands)
  - South Wellesley Islands (Allen, Horseshoe, Albinia, Bentinck, Fowler, and Sweers Islands)
  - West Wellesley Islands (Forsyth, Ivis, Pains, and Bayley Islands)
- Wheeler Island
- Whitsunday Islands
  - Daydream Island
  - Dent Island
  - Hamilton Island
  - Hayman Island
  - Hook Island
  - Keswick Island
  - Lindeman Island
  - Long Island
  - South Molle Island
  - Whitsunday Island
- Wilson Island
- Woody Island

== South Australia ==
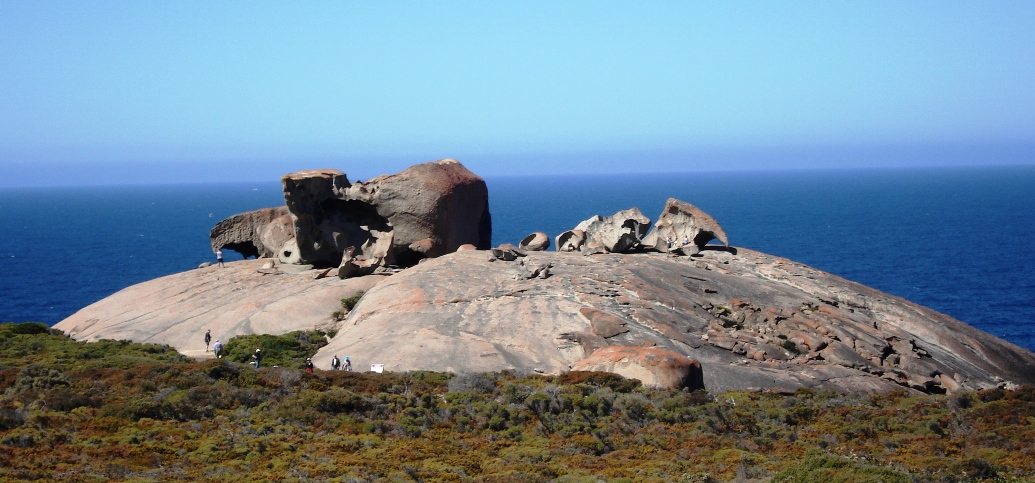
Remarkable Rocks on Kangaroo Island, 2007

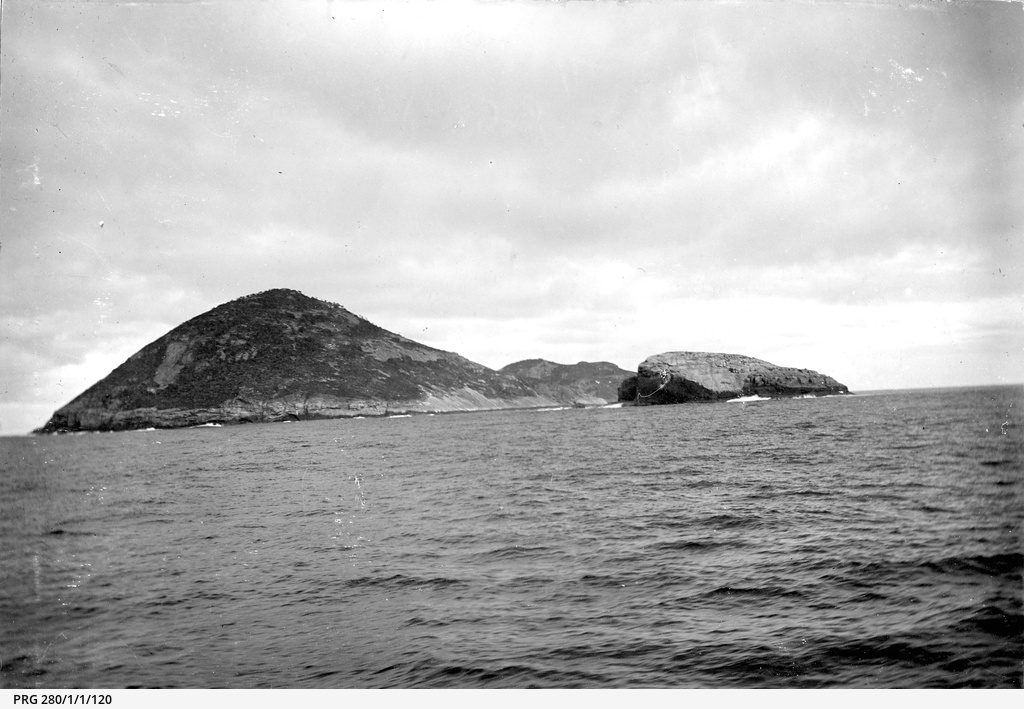
Greenly Island; a distant view taken from the sea (circa 1903) (State Library of South Australia PRG 280/1/1/120)

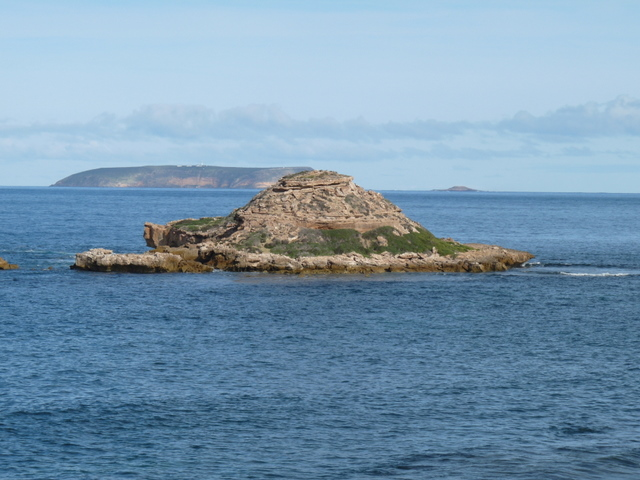
Chinamans Hat Island as viewed from the nearby coastline

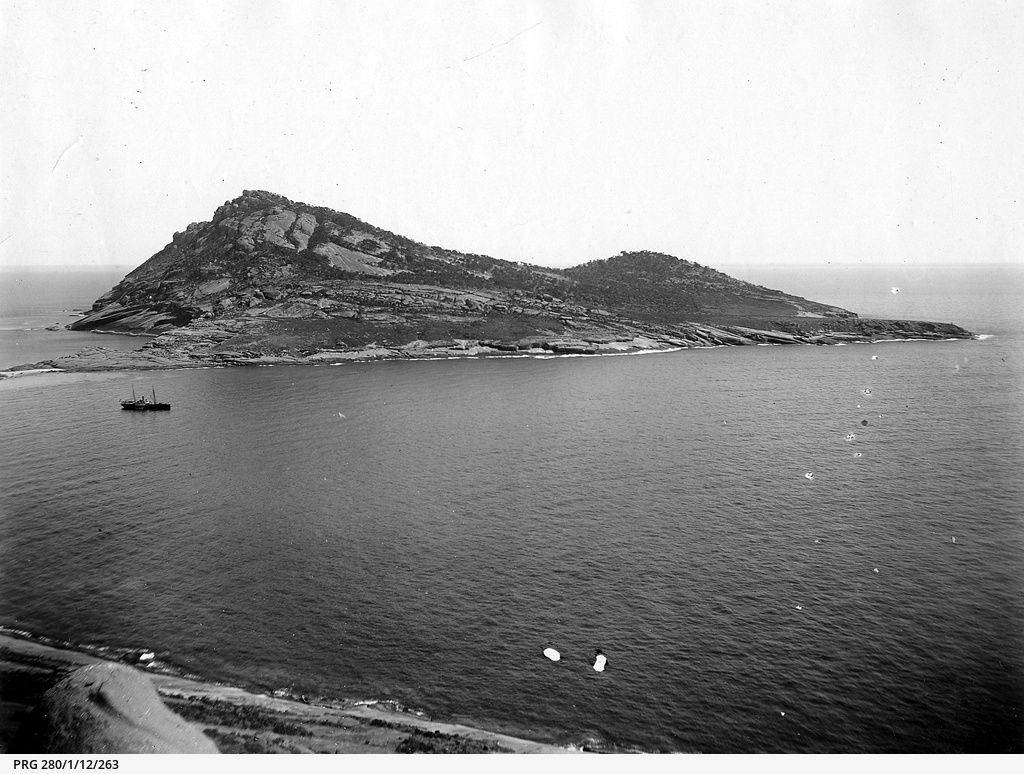
View of Pearson Island from its south end circa 1914 (State Library of South Australia PRG-280-1-12-263)

=== Ocean islands ===
- Althorpe Islands
  - Haystack Island
  - Seal Island (Investigator Strait)
- Beatrice Islets
- Bicker Isles
- Bird Islands
- Boston Island
- Busby Islet
- Casuarina Islets
- Chinamans Hat Island
- Curlew Island
- Douglas Rock
- Entrance Island
- Gambier Islands
- Garden Island
- Goose Island
- Granite Island
- Grantham Island
- Greenly Island
- Grindal Island
- Investigator Group
  - Flinders Island
  - Pearson Isles
    - Dorothee Island
    - Pearson Island
    - Veteran Isles
  - Topgallant Islands
  - Waldegrave Islands
  - Ward Islands
- Jones Island
- Kangaroo Island, Australia's third-largest island
- Liguanea Island
- Lipson Island
- Louth Island
- Neptune Islands
- Nicolas Baudin Island
- Nobby Islet
- Nuyts Archipelago
  - St Francis Island
  - St Peter Island
  - Smooth Island
- Middle Island
- Owen Island
- Paisley Islet
- Pelorus Islet
- Pullen Island
- Rabbit Island, Coffin Bay
- Rabbit Island, Louth Bay
- Rabbit Islet, Pelican Lagoon
- Royston Island
- St Francis Island
- St Peter Island
- Shag Island
- Sir Joseph Banks Group
  - Blyth Island
  - Boucaut Island
  - Dalby Island
  - Dangerous Reef
  - Duffield Island
  - English Island
  - Hareby Island
  - Kirkby Island
  - Langton Island
  - Lusby Island
  - Marum Island
  - Partney Island
  - Reevesby Island
  - Roxby Island
  - Seal Rock
  - Sibsey Island
  - Spilsby Island
  - Stickney Island
  - Winceby Island
- Seal Island (Encounter Bay)
- South Island
- Taylor Island
- Thistle Island
- Torrens Island
- Troubridge Island
- Tumby Island
- Unnamed island, Baird Bay
- Wardang Island
- Wedge Island
- Weeroona Island
- West Island
- Wright Island

=== Murray River islands ===
- Hindmarsh Island
- Mundoo Island
- Pomanda Island
- Rabbit Island, Coorong

== Tasmania ==
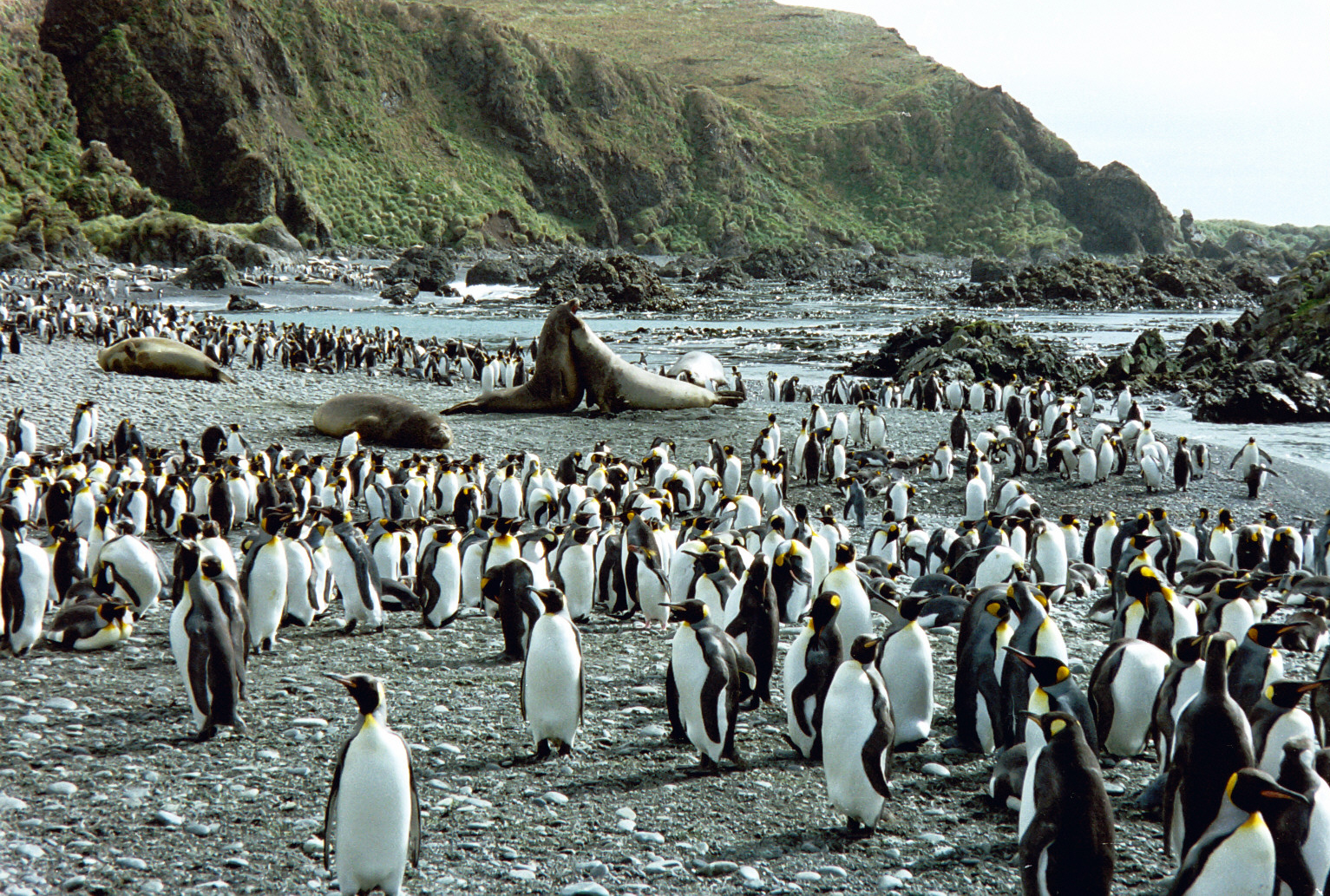
Macquarie Island

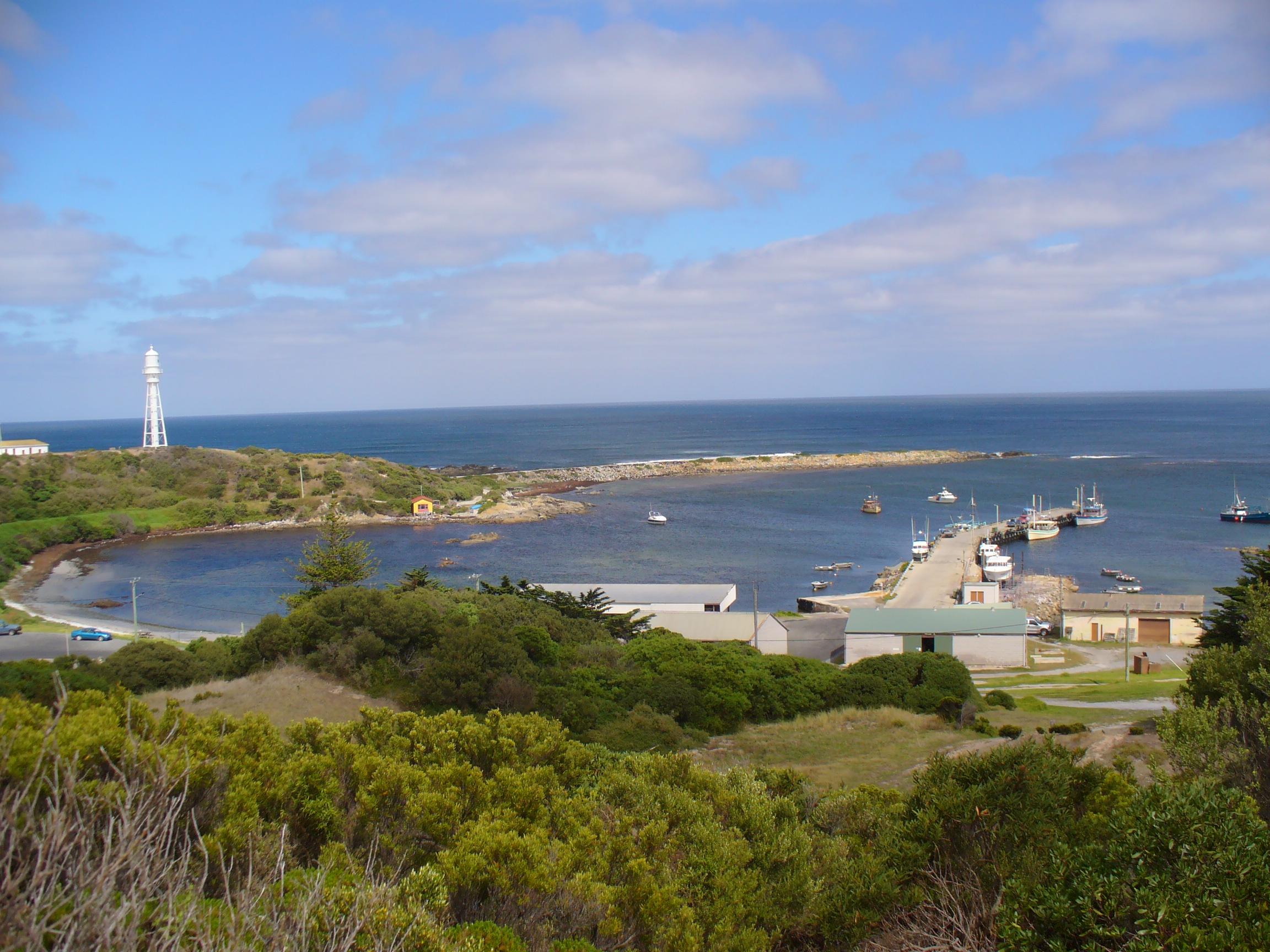
Currie harbour on King Island, 2007

Tasmania is a large island state off the south-east coast of mainland Australia. The main island of Tasmania (which includes 94% of the state's land area) does not have a defined name but can be referred to as the "Tasmanian mainland". There are 334 islands (or islets) within the state of Tasmania; with the main islands listed below, each having a land area greater than 100 hectares (250 acres). A full list of all 334 islands is located at the list of islands of Tasmania.

- Bruny Island
- Furneaux Island Group
  - Anderson Island
  - Babel Island
  - Badger Island
  - Big Green Island
  - Cape Barren Island
  - Clarke Island
  - East Kangaroo Island
  - Flinders Island
  - Goose Island
  - Great Dog Island
  - Long Island
  - Mount Chappell Island
- Hogan Island
- Hunter Island Group
  - Hunter Island
  - Robbins Island
  - Three Hummock Island
- Kent Island Group
  - Deal Island
  - Dover Island
  - Erith Island
- King Island
- Maatsuyker Islands Group
  - Chicken Island
  - De Witt Island
  - Maatsuyker Island
- Macquarie Island
- Maria Island
  - Ile du Nord
- Partridge Island
- Petrel Island Group
  - Big Sandy Petrel Island
  - Big Stony Petrel Island
  - Little Stony Petrel Island
  - South West Petrel Island
  - Kangaroo Island
  - Howie Island
- Picnic Island
- Robbins Island
  - Walker Island (northwest)
- Rodondo Island
- Schouten Island
- Sloping Island Group
  - Sloping Island
  - Smooth Island (Tasmania)
- Waterhouse Island Group
  - Swan Island
  - Waterhouse Island

== Victoria ==
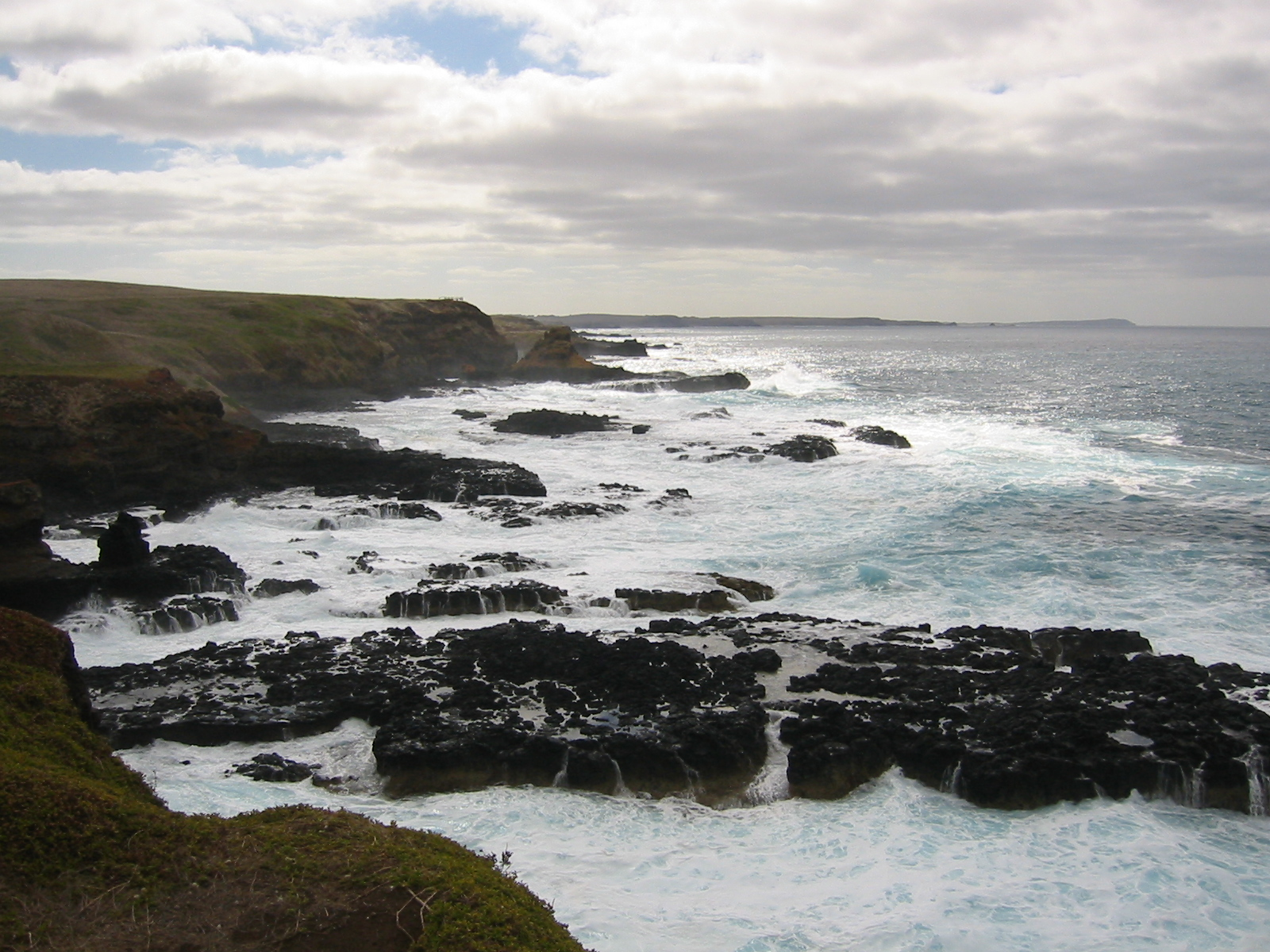
Phillip Island, 2003

- Anser Island
- Barrallier Island
- Bennison Island
- Chinaman Island
- Churchill Island
- Corner Island
- Duck Island
- Elizabeth Island
- French Island
- Gabo Island
- Griffiths Island
- Joe Island
- Kanowna Island
- Lady Julia Percy Island
- Mud Islands
- Norman Island
- Phillip Island
- Raymond Island
- Rotamah Island
- Sandstone Island
- Shellback Island
- Snake Island
- Sunday Island
- Swan Island
- Tullaberga Island
- Mangrove Islet

=== River islands ===
- Beveridge Island
- Coode Island
- Gunbower Island
- Herring Island
- Jordan's Island
- Pental Island

== Western Australia ==
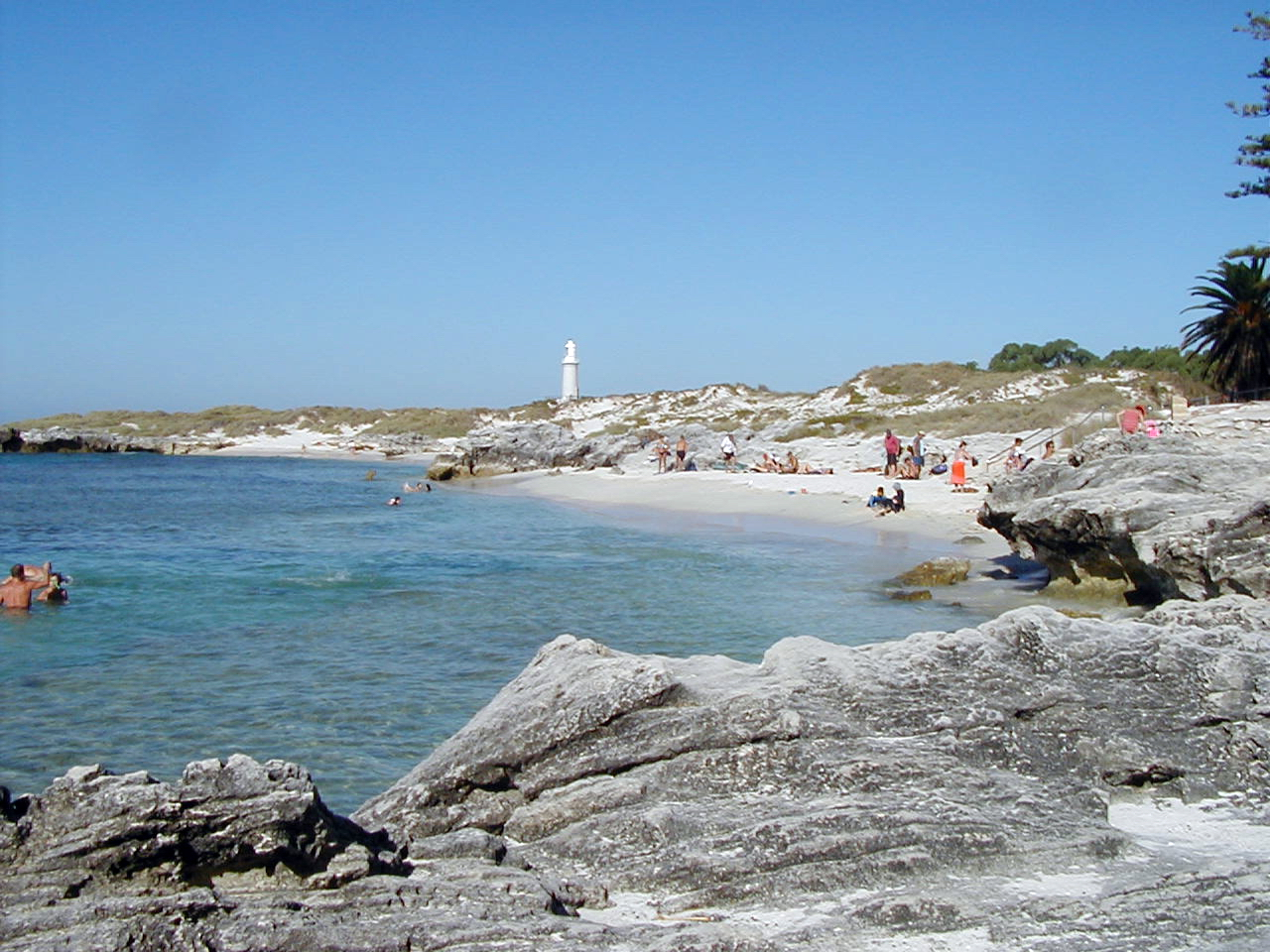
Rottnest Island, 2003

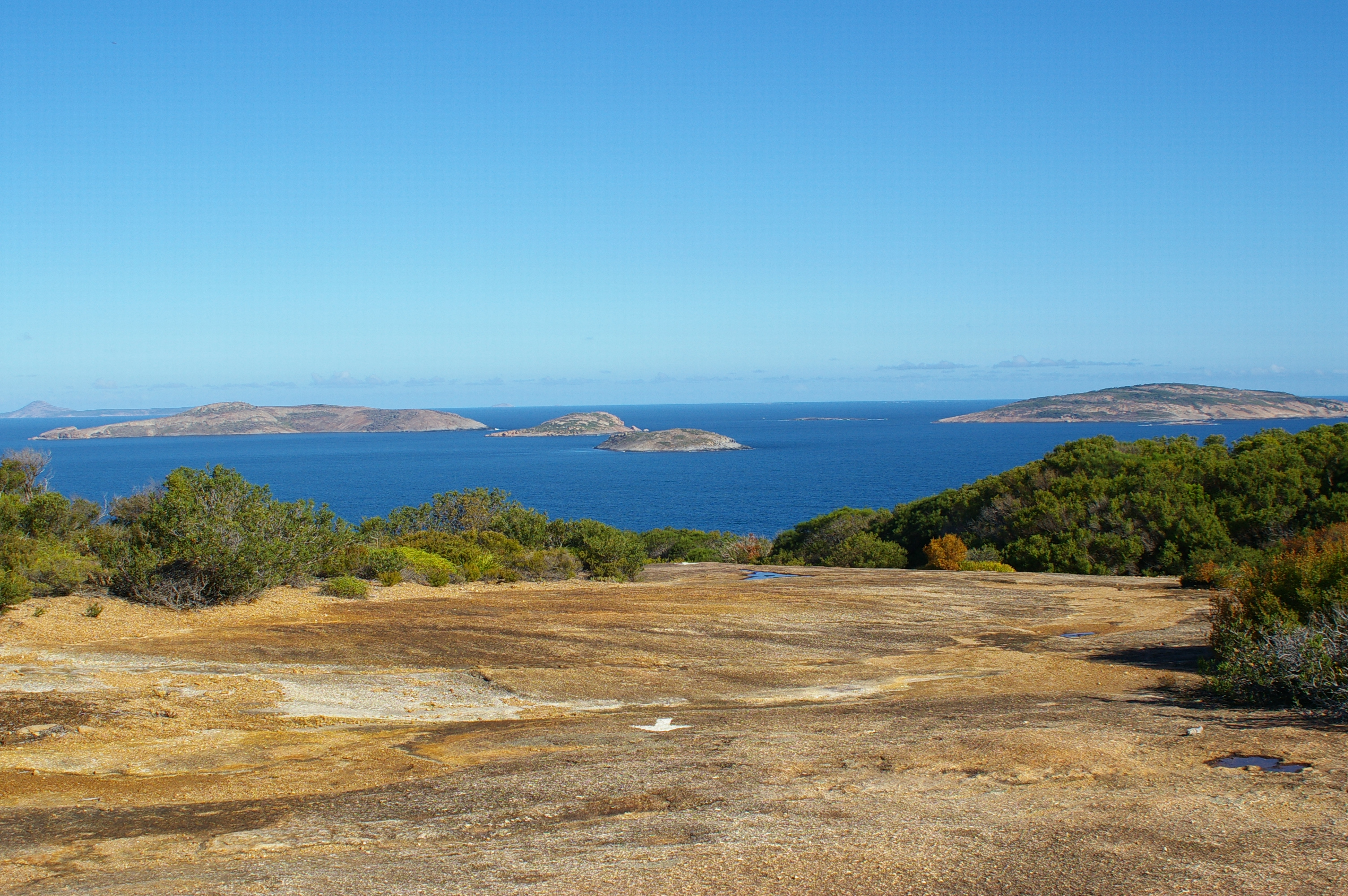
View of the Recherche Archipelago from Dempster Head

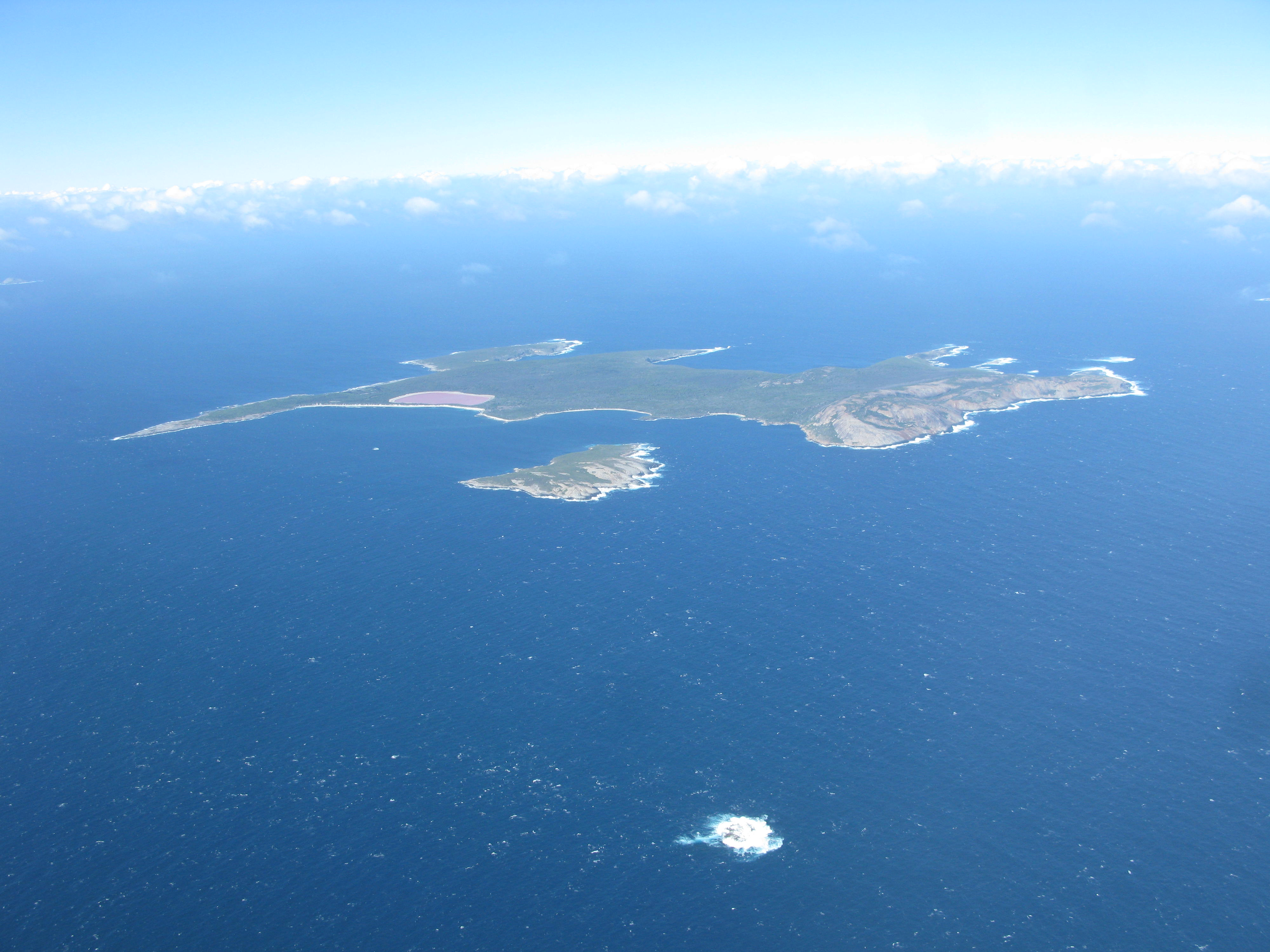
Middle Island, Recherche Archipelago 2011

Over 1,000 islands have been gazetted – only the island groups and major islands are listed.

- Ashmore Reef
- Barrow Island
- Bonaparte Archipelago
- Buccaneer Archipelago
  - Cockatoo Island
- Cape Leeuwin Islands
- Carnac Island
- Dampier Archipelago
- Dirk Hartog Island
- Garden Island
- Houtman Abrolhos
  - Easter Group
  - Pelsaert Group
  - Wallabi Group
- Lacepede Islands
- Lowendal Islands
- Mary Anne Group
- Montebello Islands
- Recherché Archipelago
- Rottnest Island
- Rowley Shoals
- Scott and Seringapatam Reefs
- Shark Bay islands
- Wedge Island

== Australian Capital Territory ==
- Kingston Island
- Pine Island
- Queen Elizabeth II Island
- Spinnaker Island
- Springbank Island

== Jervis Bay Territory ==
- Bowen Island

== External territories ==
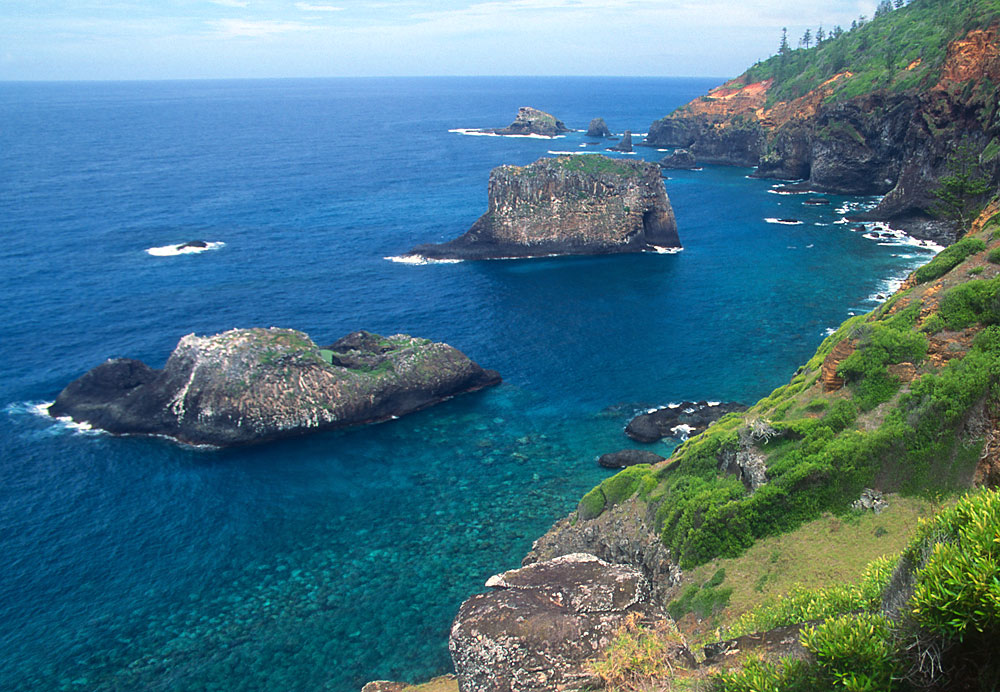
Norfolk Island, 2007

- Ashmore and Cartier Islands
- Australian Antarctic Territory
  - Achernar Island
  - Masson Island
  - Hawker Island
  - Frazier Islands
  - Giganteus Island
- Christmas Island
- Cocos (Keeling) Islands
  - Horsburgh Island
  - Home Island
  - North Keeling Island
  - West Island
- Coral Sea Islands
  - Cato Island
  - Elizabeth Reef
  - Middleton Reef
  - Willis Island
- Heard Island and McDonald Islands
- Norfolk Island
  - Nepean Island
  - Phillip Island

== See also ==
- List of islands
- List of islands in the Pacific Ocean
- List of islands in the Indian Ocean
- List of islands of Asia
- List of Torres Strait Islands
