= Petrel Island =

Petrel Island may refer to:

== Petrel Group in Australia ==
- Big Sandy Petrel Island
- Big Stony Petrel Island
- Little Stony Petrel Island
- South West Petrel Island
- Kangaroo Island (Tasmania)
- Howie Island

== Other places ==
- Petrel Island (Antarctica)
- Bajo Nuevo Bank, also known as the Petrel Islands, Colombia
- Petrel Island (South Georgia)
