= Robbins Passage and Boullanger Bay Important Bird Area =

Important Bird Area in Tasmania, Australia

Coordinates: 40°42′44″S 144°56′34″E

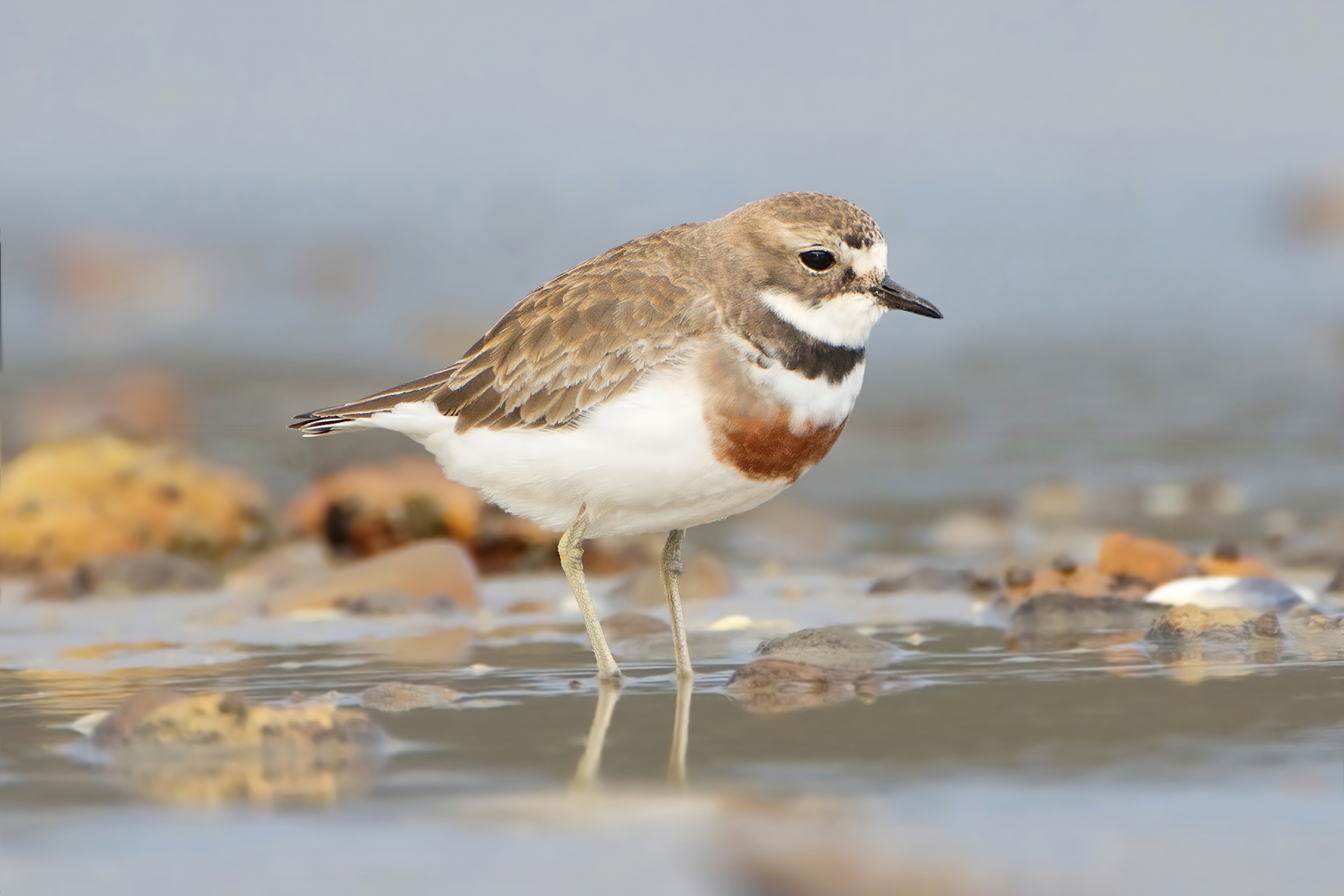
The site is important for double-banded plovers

The Robbins Passage and Boullanger Bay Important Bird Area is a 238 km^{2} tract of land at the western end of the north coast of Tasmania, south-eastern Australia. It comprises extensive areas of intertidal mudflats and saltmarsh with adjacent farmland. It is an important site for waders, or shorebirds.

== Description ==
The site encompasses all the mudflats around Robbins Island, extending eastwards around Perkins Bay to North Point. It includes most of the Duck Bay, Lees Point, Perkins Island and West Inlet Conservation Areas, as well as the Petrel Islands. It is adjacent to the northern end of the North-west Tasmanian Coast Important Bird Area in the west.

The Petrel Islands Group includes Big Stony, Little Stony, Big Sandy and South West Petrel Islands. They support breeding short-tailed shearwaters and are heavily used for muttonbirding.

== Birds ==
The site has been identified by BirdLife International as an Important Bird Area (IBA) because it supports over 1% of the world populations of red-necked stints, double-banded plovers, pied and sooty oystercatchers, and a population of hooded plovers. The IBA is the most important site for waders in Tasmania, with over 25,000 birds using it in summer.

The saltmarsh and fringing farmland provide habitat for critically endangered orange-bellied parrots on migration, as well as flame robins and many of Tasmania's endemic bird species. Significant numbers of ruddy turnstones and Far Eastern curlews have been recorded. White-bellied sea eagles and Tasmanian wedge-tailed eagles breed within the site. The IBA also supports some 242,000 breeding pairs of short-tailed shearwaters.
