= Kangaroo Island (disambiguation) =

Kangaroo Island is an island off the south coast of South Australia.

Kangaroo Island may also refer to:

== Other islands ==
=== Queensland ===
- Kangaroo Island (Queensland)

=== Tasmania ===
- Kangaroo Island (Tasmania), in North West Tasmania, in Bass Strait
- East Kangaroo Island, in North East Tasmania, in Bass Strait

=== Western Australia ===
- Kangaroo Island (Shark Bay), one of the islands in the Shark Bay World Heritage Reserve in Western Australia

== Other uses ==
- Kangaroo Island (film), a 2024 feature film filmed on Kangaroo Island, SA
- Kangaroo Island Council, which governs the namesake island

== See also ==
- Kangaroo Island wine region
