= Horseshoe Island =

There are several islands named Horseshoe Island:

- Horseshoe Island (Antarctica)
- Horseshoe Island (Wisconsin)
- Horseshoe Island, Bermuda
- Horseshoe Island, Queensland
