= Picnic Island (disambiguation) =

Picnic Island is a small island off the coast of Tasmania. The name may also refer to:

- Picnic Islands, part of the city of Miami
- Sheep Island (Washington), also known as Picnic Island
- "Picnic Island", a song by Jeff Watson from his album Lone Ranger
