= Morris Island (disambiguation) =

Morris Island is an uninhabited island within Charleston Harbor in the U.S. state of South Carolina.

Morris Island may also refer to:

== North America ==
- Morris Island (Massachusetts), an island of Massachusetts
- Morris Island, Nova Scotia, a community in Argyle
- Morris Island (Virginia), an island within the Chincoteague National Wildlife Refuge in Virginia
- Morris Island Conservation Area, on the Ottawa River near Ottawa, Ontario, Canada

== Australia ==
- Morris Island (Queensland), a small island in the Great Barrier Reef, Queensland Australia

== Antarctica ==
- Morris Island (Antarctica)
