= List of shipwrecks in July 1859 =

The list of shipwrecks in July 1859 includes ships sunk, foundered, grounded, or otherwise lost during July 1859.

== 1 July ==
List of shipwrecks: 1 July 1859
Ship	State	Description
John L. Dimmock	United States	The barque was driven ashore at Höganäs, Sweden. She was on a voyage from Mobile, Alabama to Kronstadt, Russia.

== 2 July ==
List of shipwrecks: 2 July 1859
Ship	State	Description
Rossett	United Kingdom	The smack ran aground on the Skirweathers Bank, in the Bristol Channel off the coast of Glamorgan and sank. Her crew survived. She was on a voyage from Chester, Cheshire to Bridgwater, Somerset.
Sunshine	United States	The barque capsized off Fairport, New York with the loss of nine of the seventeen people on board.
William Gibson	United Kingdom	The ship was abandoned in the South Atlantic. She was on a voyage from Glasgow, Renfrewshire to Valparaíso, Chile.

== 3 July ==
List of shipwrecks: 3 July 1859
Ship	State	Description
Albatross	United Kingdom	The yacht sank in a thunderstorm at Gravesend, Kent with the loss of four of the eight people on board.

== 4 July ==
List of shipwrecks: 4 July 1859
Ship	State	Description
Royalist	United Kingdom	The fishing boat struck a sunken wreck and sank off Lowestoft, Suffolk. Her crew were rescued.
Sylla	United Kingdom	The ship was driven ashore at Holyhead, Anglesey. She was on a voyage from Swansea, Glamorgan to Liverpool, Lancashire. She had become a wreck by 11 July.

== 5 July ==
List of shipwrecks: 5 July 1859
Ship	State	Description
Alma	United Kingdom	The ship ran aground and capsized at the Sandheads, India with the loss of more than 22 lives. She was on a voyage from Calcutta, India to Mauritius.
Dunedin	United Kingdom	The steamship was in collision with the steamship Lady Alice Lambton (United Kingdom) and sank off the mouth of the Elbe. All on board were rescued.
Pedlar	United Kingdom	The brig was wrecked on a reef off Culebra Island, Puerto Rico. She was on a voyage from Liverpool, Lancashire to Saint Thomas, Virgin Islands.

== 6 July ==
List of shipwrecks: 6 July 1859
Ship	State	Description
Conferentsraad	Norway	The ship ran ashore at Gottska Sandö, Sweden and was wrecked. Her crew were rescued. She was on a voyage from Härnösand, Sweden to London, United Kingdom.
James Carson	United Kingdom	The full-rigged ship was abandoned in the South Atlantic (24°20′S 27°07′W) in a sinking condition. Her 31 crew were rescued by the full-rigged ship Marathon (United Kingdom). James Carson was on a voyage from the Clyde to Bombay, India.

== 7 July ==
List of shipwrecks: 7 July 1859
Ship	State	Description
Ebenezer	(United Kingdom of Great Britain and Ireland) Tasmania	The cutter was driven onto a reef in Robbins Passage and sank. Her crew were ashore.
Elk	United Kingdom	The Belfast and Glasgow mail steamer ran aground at Ballymacormick Point near Groomsport, County Down, Ireland.

== 8 July ==
List of shipwrecks: 8 July 1859
Ship	State	Description
Jylland	Denmark	The brig was abandoned in the Atlantic Ocean in a sinking condition. Her crew were rescued by the schooner Ceres (Hamburg). Jylland was on a voyage from Glasgow, Renfrewshire, United Kingdom to Rio de Janeiro, Brazil.

== 9 July ==
List of shipwrecks: 9 July 1859
Ship	State	Description
Amphitrite	United Kingdom	The brig ran aground on the Fahludd Reef, in the Baltic Sea. She was on a voyage from Hull, Yorkshire to Kronstadt, Russia. She was later refloated and resumed her voyage.{
Ocean	France	The ship was driven ashore and wrecked at Arkhangelsk, Russia.
Symmetry	United Kingdom	The ship was driven ashore and wrecked at Arkhangelsk.

== 10 July ==
List of shipwrecks: 10 July 1859
Ship	State	Description
Eliza Bain	United Kingdom	The brig was destroyed by fire at Kingston, Jamaica.
Lancaster	United States	The barque foundered at "Malaki".
Standard	United Kingdom	The barque ran aground at South Shields, County Durham. She was on a voyage from Quebec City, Province of Canada, British North America to South Shields.
Valentine Hellicar	(United Kingdom of Great Britain and Ireland) Victoria	The schooner was wrecked on Otaki Beach in New Zealand during a thunderstorm and gale while en route from Melbourne to Port Cooper. All hands were saved.

== 11 July ==
List of shipwrecks: 11 July 1859
Ship	State	Description
Rob Roy	United Kingdom	The ship ran aground on the Johore Shoal, off the coast of Malaya. She was on a voyage from Sarawak, Malaya to Singapore, Straits Settlements. She was refloated and resumed her voyage.

== 12 July ==
List of shipwrecks: 12 July 1859
Ship	State	Description
Harpy	Norway	The ship was wrecked on Seskar, Russia. Her crew were rescued. She was on a voyage from Kronstadt, Russia to te Bristol Channel.
Hinda	(Denmark) Duchy of Schleswig	The schooner was wrecked on the Kleine Vogelsand, in the North Sea. Her crew were rescued. She was on a voyage from Sunderland, County Durham, United Kingdom to Glückstadt.
Macaulay	United States	The ship ran aground off the coast of Zeeland, Netherlands.
Nautilus	United Kingdom	The ship struck Tings Rocks, off Hartland Point, Devon. She was on a voyage from Hayle, Cornwall to Swansea, Glamorgan. She put in to Ilfracombe, Devon in a severely leaky condition.

== 13 July ==
List of shipwrecks: 13 July 1859
Ship	State	Description
Juan Fernandez	United States	The ship ran aground off Mindoro, Spanish East Indies and consequently foundered two days later. She was on a voyage from Manilla, Spanish East Indies to Boston, Massachusetts.

== 14 July ==
List of shipwrecks: 14 July 1859
Ship	State	Description
Arrow	(United Kingdom of Great Britain and Ireland) New South Wales	The brigantine ran aground off the Tweed River Bar, New South Wales.
Carron	United Kingdom	The steamship collided with the brig Viscountess Canning ( (United Kingdom of Great Britain and Ireland) Guernsey) and sank off Pakefield, Suffolk. Her crew were rescued. She was on a voyage from London to Grangemouth, Stirlingshire.
Dohallard	France	The schooner was wrecked in the Bay of Biscay while en route to Nantes, France.
Thetis	United Kingdom	The steamship ran aground and sank at Kuressaare, Russia.

== 15 July ==
List of shipwrecks: 15 July 1859
Ship	State	Description
Hinde	United Kingdom	The brig ran aground on the Goodwin Sands, Kent. She was refloated and resumed her voyage.
Samuel Guiseppe	Austrian Empire	The ship was wrecked at Cape St. Rocque, Brazil.
Victor	United Kingdom	The brig was driven ashore at Ness Point, Suffolk. She was on a voyage from Lowestoft, Suffolk to Hartlepool, County Durham. She was refloated and resumed her voyage.

== 16 July ==
List of shipwrecks: 16 July 1859
Ship	State	Description
Catherine	United Kingdom	The smack collided with the tug Reliance and sank in the River Mersey at Liverpool, Lancashire. Her crew were rescued. She was on a voyage from Port St. Mary, Isle of Man to Liverpool. She was refloated on 21 July.
Premier	United Kingdom	The ship was abandoned in the Atlantic Ocean 180 nautical miles (330 km) off Tristan d'Acunha. Her crew were rescued by Amica (Kingdom of Hanover).

== 17 July ==
List of shipwrecks: 17 July 1859
Ship	State	Description
Cargey	United Kingdom	The ship ran aground and was damaged at Blyth, Northumberland. She was on a voyage from Blyth to Beyrout, Ottoman Syria. She was refloated and put back to Blyth for repairs.
Jeanette Melanie	Belgium	The brig ran aground on the Gabbard Sand, in the North Sea. She was on a voyage form Newcastle upon Tyne, Northumberland, United Kingdom to Lisbon, Portugal. She was refloated and taken in to Dover, Kent, United Kingdom in a leaky condition. Subsequently repaired at Ostend, West Flanders.

== 18 July ==
List of shipwrecks: 18 July 1859
Ship	State	Description
Ruby	United Kingdom	The schooner became leaky and was abandoned in the English Channel. Her five cew survived. She was on a voyage from Totnes, Devon to Neath, Glamorgan. Ruby was subsequently towed in to Plymouth, Devon by a pilot boat. Investigation revealed that holes had been deliberately bored in her stern.

== 19 July ==
List of shipwrecks: 19 July 1859
Ship	State	Description
Waterwitch	United Kingdom	The schooner ran aground on the Middle Sand, in the River Tyne.

== 20 July ==
List of shipwrecks: July 1859
Ship	State	Description
Johanna	United Kingdom	The ship foundered 20 nautical miles (37 km) west of the Isles of Scilly. Her crew were rescued by Nepalese Ambassador (United Kingdom). Johanna was on a voyage from Swansea, Glamorgan to Algiers, Algeria.
Seraphina	United Kingdom	The brig was wrecked on Fortune Island, Bahamas. Her crew were rescued. She was on a voyage from Saint Domingo to Falmouth, Cornwall.

== 22 July ==
List of shipwrecks: 22 July 1859
Ship	State	Description
A. D. Whiddew	United Kingdom	The brig capsized and sank at Aux Cayes, Haiti.
Palestine	United Kingdom	The ship was driven ashore 5 nautical miles (9.3 km) north of "Pittshead". She was on a voyage from "Kooria Mooria" (Khuriya Muriya Islands) to Cromarty.
Swallow	United Kingdom	The brig was wrecked on Saaremaa, Russia. SHe was on a voyage from Newcastle upon Tyne, Northumberland to Kronstadt, Russia.

== 23 July ==
List of shipwrecks: 23 July 1859
Ship	State	Description
Earl of Sefton	United Kingdom	The ship was destroyed by fire at Monkey Point, Burma.
Helen	United Kingdom	The ship capsized in the River Tyne at Hetton-le-Hole, County Durham and was damaged. She was on a voyage from Montrose, Forfarshire to the River Tyne. She was righted the next day.
Nathalie	United Kingdom	The full-rigged ship was wrecked off Bombay, India with the loss of three of her crew.

== 24 July ==
List of shipwrecks: 24 July 1859
Ship	State	Description
Advice	United Kingdom	The whaler was crushed by ice and sank off Cape Hooper, Greenland.. Her crew were rescued on 26 July by Emma (United Kingdom)
Francis Ridley	United Kingdom	The ship was driven onto a reef off Aux Cayes, Haiti. She was refloated, but was consequently condemned.
Magnolia	United Kingdom	The brig was wrecked at Belvidere, Cape Colony. Her nine crew were rescued. She was on a voyage from Cape Town to Knysna.

== 25 July ==
List of shipwrecks: 25 July 1859
Ship	State	Description
Bertha	Grand Duchy of Oldenburg	The brigantine foundered 15 nautical miles (28 km) off Adra, Spain. Her seven crew were rescued by the schooner Dos Amigos (Portugal). Bertha was on a voyage from Brăila, Ottoman Empire to Falmouth, Cornwall, United Kingdom.

== 26 July ==
List of shipwrecks: 26 July 1859
Ship	State	Description
Louisa Jane	United Kingdom	The ship struck a sunken rock and sank in Loch Carron. She was on a voyage from Liverpool, Lancashire to Wick, Caithness.

== 27 July ==
List of shipwrecks: 27 July 1859
Ship	State	Description
Adeline	United Kingdom	The ship was abandoned in the Atlantic Ocean. All on board were rescued by Glencairn (United Kingdom). Adeline was on a voyage from Glasgow, Renfrewshire to Providence, Rhode Island, United States.
Catherine	Netherlands	The ship was wrecked on the coast of East Frisia. Her six crew were rescued.
Duque do Porto	Portugal	After hitting a rock in fog, the ship was beached at Peniche, Portugal.
Evergreen	United Kingdom	The barque ran aground and was severely damaged at Bridgwater, Somerset. She was on a voyage from Quebec City, Province of Canada, British North America to Bridgwater. She was refloated and taken in to Bridgwater.
Happy Return	United Kingdom	The coble collided with a brig and sank in the North Sea with the loss of one of her three crew. Survivors were rescued by the brig.
Plantaganet	United Kingdom	The full-rigged ship was destroyed by fire in the Demerara river. Her crew survived. She was on a voyage from Demerara, British Guiana to a British port.
Xerezano	United Kingdom	The ship was wrecked on the Bird Rock, in the Crooked Island Passage, Bahamas. She was on a voyage from Gonaïves, Haiti to London.

== 28 July ==
List of shipwrecks: 28 July 1859
Ship	State	Description
Casilda	Spain	The brigantine collided with an American vessel and was severely damaged. She was abandoned the next day. Her crew were rescued. Casilda was on a voyage from Valencia to Santander.
Victoria	United Kingdom	The ship was wrecked between the Isla de Lobos and Cape Samaira, Uruguay with the loss of all hands.

== 29 July ==
List of shipwrecks: 29 July 1859
Ship	State	Description
Hope	United Kingdom	The ship collided with the steamship Kazan (Russia) and sank off the French coast. Her crew were rescued. She was on a voyage from Havre de Grâce, Seine-Inférieure, France to the River Wear.
Lile	United Kingdom	The schooner ran aground on the Sunk Sand, in the North Sea off the coast of Essex. She was on a voyage from London to Newcastle upon Tyne, Northumberland. She was refloated and departed for her homeport of Plymouth for repairs.

== 30 July ==
List of shipwrecks: 30 July 1859
Ship	State	Description
Ebenezer	(United Kingdom of Great Britain and Ireland) New South Wales	The schooner ran aground at the mouth of the Tweed River and was wrecked with the loss of four lives. She was on a voyage from Sydney to the Tweed River.
Woodlark	United Kingdom	The brig was driven ashore at Port Natal, Cape Colony. She was on a voyage from London to Port Natal.

== 31 July ==
List of shipwrecks: 31 July 1859
Ship	State	Description
Enterprise	United Kingdom	The schooner was wrecked on the Black Rock, in Galway Bay. Her six crew were rescued by the Coast Guard. She was on a voyage from Troon, Ayrshire to Dublin.
Sofira	Malta	The brig was run down and sunk in Besika Bay by the barque Lily (United Kingdom).

== Unknown date ==
List of shipwrecks: Unknown date in July 1859
Ship	State	Description
Abbey Blanchard	United Kingdom	The ship severely damaged by fire at Marseille, Bouches-du-Rhône, France.
Canning	India	The tug sank at "Colhec" with the loss of twelve of her crew.
Daphne	United Kingdom	The ship foundered in the North Sea. She was on a voyage from Hartlepool, County Durham to Hamburg.
Edward and William	United Kingdom	The ship was wrecked at Thurso, Caithness. She was refloated in late August and taken in to for Grimsby, Lincolnshire.
Forbes	United Kingdom	The steamship sank at Diamond Harbour, India. She was later refloated.
Glance	United States	The ship caught fire in the North Sea. She was on a voyage from New York to Hamburg. She was towed in to Rotterdam, South Holland, Netherlands, where she burnt to the waterline.
Lady Rawlinson	United Kingdom	The ship was wrecked off the Rangoon Lightship ( (United Kingdom of Great Britain and Ireland) Burma) before 9 July.
Mariout	Ottoman Empire	The steamship wrecked on a reef in the Red Sea 45 nautical miles (83 km) off Cosseir, Egypt. All on board were rescued. She was on a voyage from Suez, Egypt to Djeddah, Ottoman Hejaz.
Medway	United Kingdom	The barque sank between Sulina and Tulcea, Ottoman Empire. Her crew were rescued. She was on a voyage from Waterford to Brăila, Ottoman Empire.
Petite Hermine	(United Kingdom of Great Britain and Ireland) British North America	The brig was wrecked on Langlade Island, Saint Pierre and Miquelon. She was on a voyage from Quebec City, Province of Canada to Liverpool, Lancashire.
Princess Victoria	United Kingdom	The ship was wrecked at Maranhão, Brazil.
Regina	India	The ship was driven ashore 6 nautical miles (11 km) north north west of Saugor.
Roslyn	Flag unknown	The yacht was abandoned in the Atlantic Ocean. Her crew were rescued by St. Helena (United Kingdom).
Sirius	Denmark	The brig was wrecked on Saona Island, Dominican Republic before 11 July. Her crew were rescued. She was on a voyage from Saint Croix, Virgin Islands to Saint Domingo.
Victor	United Kingdom	The full-rigged ship was driven ashore 8 nautical miles (15 km) north north west of Saugor. She was on a voyage from Calcutta, India to Réunion and Mauritius.
William Chestnut	United States	The ship was wrecked off Key Vascas.
