= Arnold Islets =

Islands of Queensland

Coordinates: 11°00′40″S 142°59′17″E

Arnold Islets are about 3 islands about 10 km east of the Apudthama National Park in the Great Barrier Reef Marine Park Queensland, Australia, in the Cape York Peninsula about 70 km southeast of Bamaga.

The island covers an area of about 5 hectares.

== See also ==
- List of islands of Australia
