= Milman Islet =

Islet in Queensland, Australia

Coordinates: 11°10′05″S 143°00′58″E

Milman Islet is a small island north of Shelburne Bay in far north Queensland, Australia about 140 km North of Cape Grenville, Cape York Peninsula in the Great Barrier Reef Marine Park Queensland, Australia. It is a hawksbill turtle nesting site.

== See also ==
- List of islands of Australia
