= Aplin Islet =

Island of Queensland

Coordinates: 11°11′28″S 143°02′20″E

Aplin Islet is a small island north of Shelburne Bay in far north Queensland, Australia about 140 km north of Cape Grenville, Cape York Peninsula in the Great Barrier Reef Marine Park Queensland, Australia. It is within the Shire of Cook. The island has an area of about 4 hectares. It rises to a height of 5.82 metres above sea level.

It is about 30 km east of Orford Ness.

== Ecology ==
Aplin Islet is a restricted access area to protect nesting seabirds.

Crocodiles have been sighted on Aplin Islet.

== See also ==
- List of islands of Australia
