= Wasp Island =

Island in New South Wales, Australia

- Location within New South Wales Location within Australia

Geography
- Location: South Coast
- Coordinates: 35°40′00.1″S 150°18′38.9″E
- Adjacent to: Tasman Sea

Administration
- Australia
- State: New South Wales
- LGA: Eurobodalla Shire

Wasp Island is an island located in the Tasman Sea, in the South Coast region of New South Wales, Australia. It is the only island in Durras Inlet near Batemans Bay.

== See also ==
- List of islands of Australia
