= Low Wooded Island =

Island in Queensland, Australia

- Interactive map of Low Wooded Island

Geography
- Location: Northern Australia
- Coordinates: 15.094°S 145.380°E
- Area: 0.45 km^{2} (0.17 sq mi)

Administration
- Australia
- State: Queensland

Low Wooded Island is the name of an island 30 km south-east of Cape Flattery in the Great Barrier Reef Marine Park Authority and within the Three Islands National Park. The island is an important seabird nesting site. It is around 45 hectares or 0.45 square km in size.

== See also ==
- List of islands of Australia
