= Haggerstone Island =

Island in Queensland, Australia

- Interactive map of Haggerstone Island

Geography
- Location: Northern Australia
- Coordinates: 12.041°S 143.299°E

Administration
- Australia
- State: Queensland

Haggerstone Island is a privately owned resort island, 10 km (6 mi) southeast of Cape Grenville in the Great Barrier Reef Marine Park of Far North Queensland, Australia.

The island is situated in Temple Bay about 200 km (124 mi) northeast of Kutini-Payamu National Park and Lockhart River on the Cape York Peninsula. It is owned by Roy and Anna Turner.

== See also ==
- List of islands of Australia
