= Coocumbac Island Nature Reserve =

Protected area in New South Wales, Australia

- IUCN category IV (habitat/species management area)
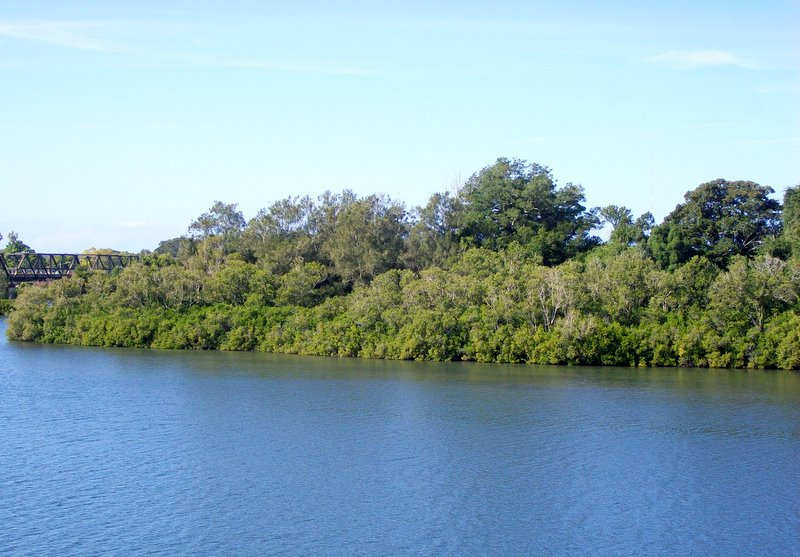
- Coocumbac Island, photographed from Taree

- Location within New South Wales
- Location: New South Wales
- Nearest city: Taree
- Coordinates: 31°55′12″S 152°27′18″E
- Area: 0.06 km^{2} (0.023 sq mi)
- Established: September 1981
- Governing body: NSW National Parks and Wildlife Service
- Website: http://www.environment.nsw.gov.au/NationalParks/parkHome.aspx?id=N0542

The Coocumbac Island Nature Reserve (Birrpayi: Gukangbang or Gukangbak) is a protected nature reserve located in the mid–north coast region of New South Wales, Australia. The 6-hectare (15-acre) reserve, situated on the Manning River near Taree, is a rare example of a subtropical lowland rainforest.

Much of Australia's lowland sub tropical rainforest was cleared for housing and agriculture, leaving only small patches remaining, such as at Coocumbac Island. The soils are derived from the Manning River. These alluvial soils are enriched from basaltic deposits upstream at Barrington Tops and the Comboyne and Bulga plateaux. The average annual rainfall in nearby Taree is 1,176 millimetres (46.3 in).

== Etymology ==
Coocumbac means "meeting place" in the local indigenous Biripi language. Australian indigenous people regularly visited the rainforest for the collection of food, medicinal purposes, the collection of fibres for making bags and nets and social gatherings. The rainforest has spiritual significance to the traditional indigenous custodians.

== Features ==
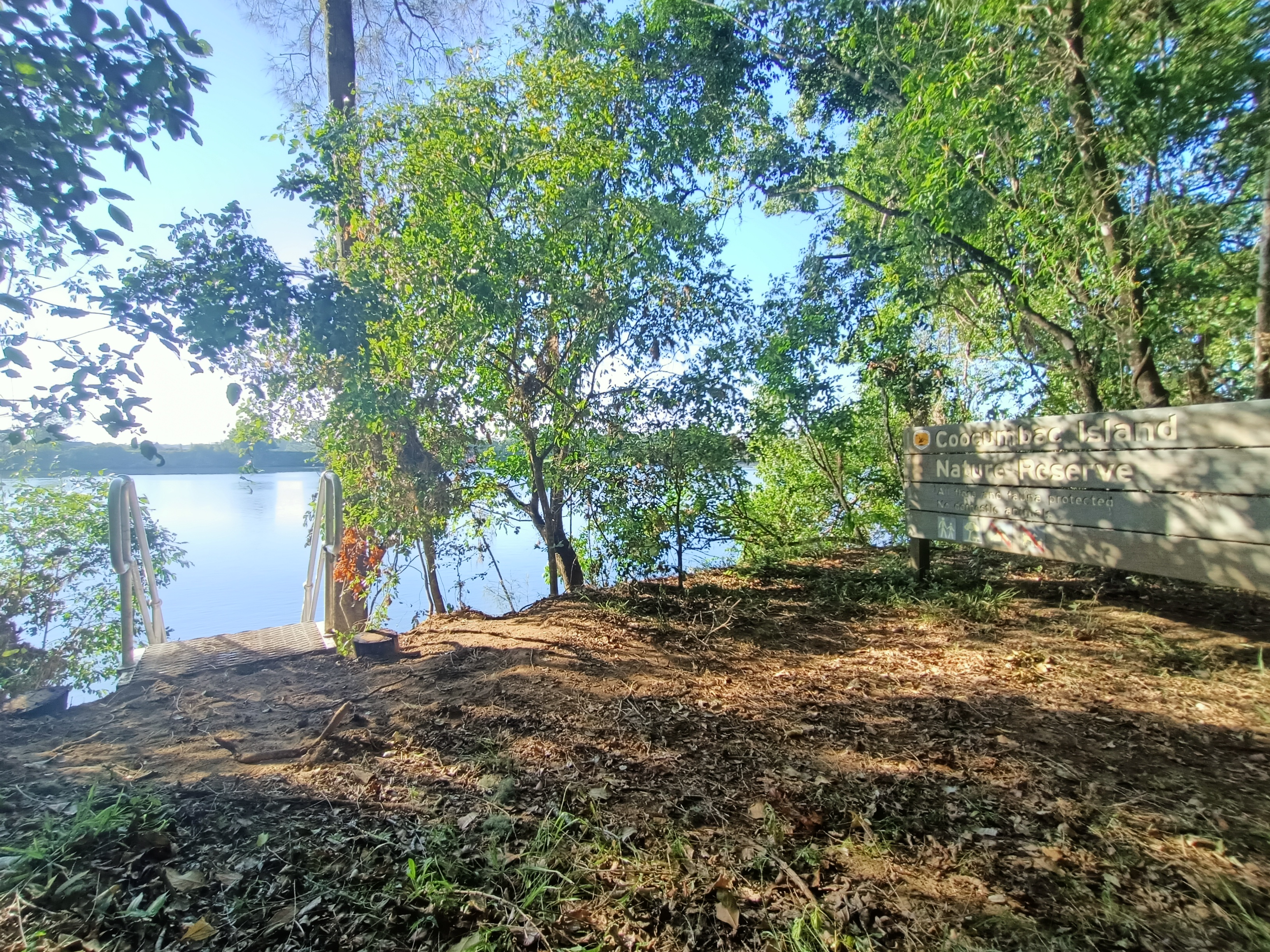
Photo of flora, signage, and waterfront view near the stairway

=== Staircase ===
The island can generally only be accessed by watercraft. Its network of trails can be accessed by pedestrians via a staircase located on the southern side of the reserve.

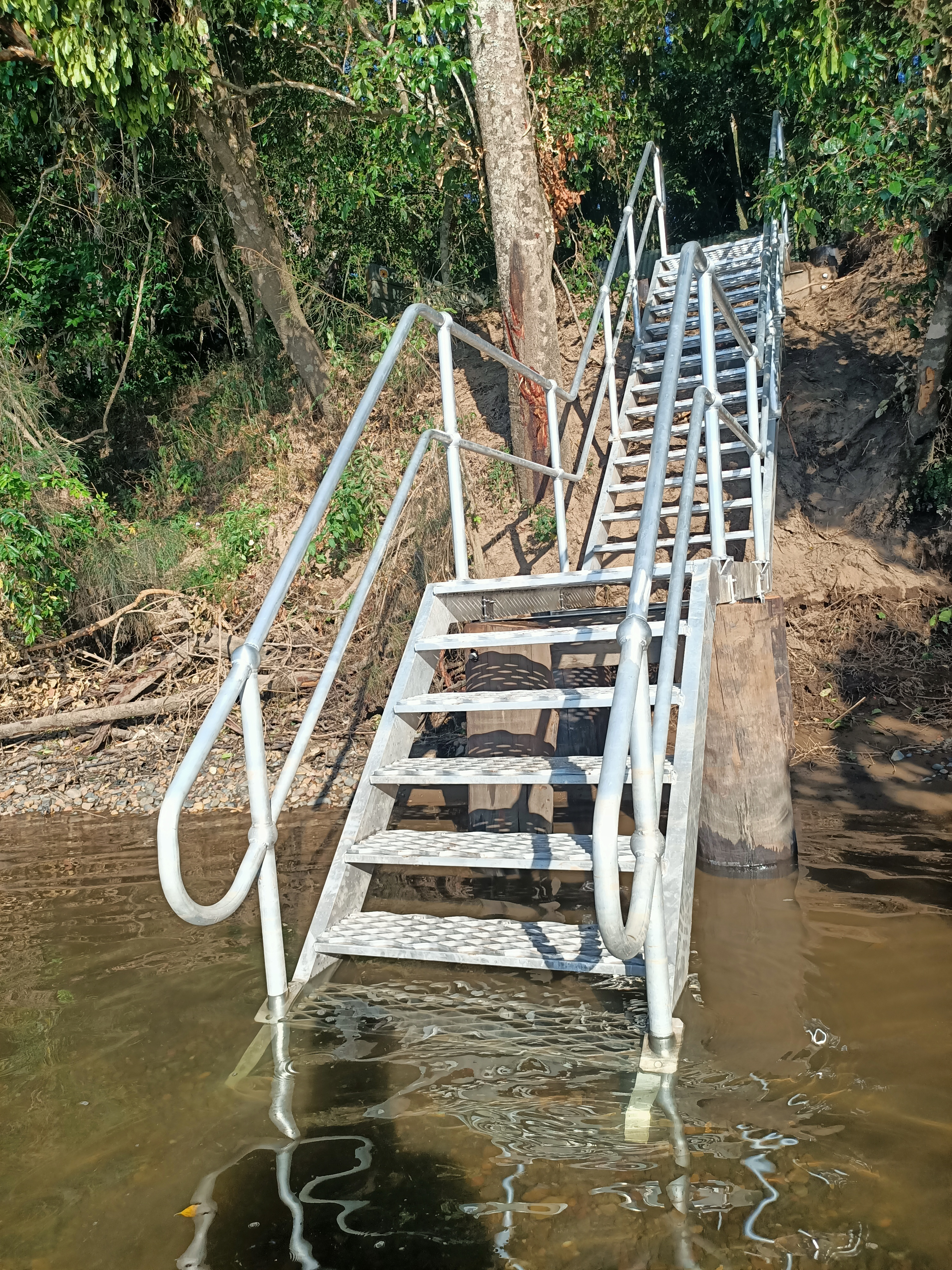
New stairs built to replace the ones destroyed in the May 2025 floods

=== Fauna ===
The most obvious mammal species on the island is the grey-headed flying fox, whose numbers may reach 5,000 at certain times of the year. Noteworthy birds occurring here include the osprey and wompoo fruit-dove.

=== Flora ===
The ecological community on the island is known as the large fig - giant stinger tree association. The genus ficus is well represented, with several strangler fig species present. Particularly prominent are the large Moreton Bay figs. Other figs are deciduous fig, small leaf fig and watery fig. The town of Taree, takes its name from another of the local figs, the sandpaper fig.

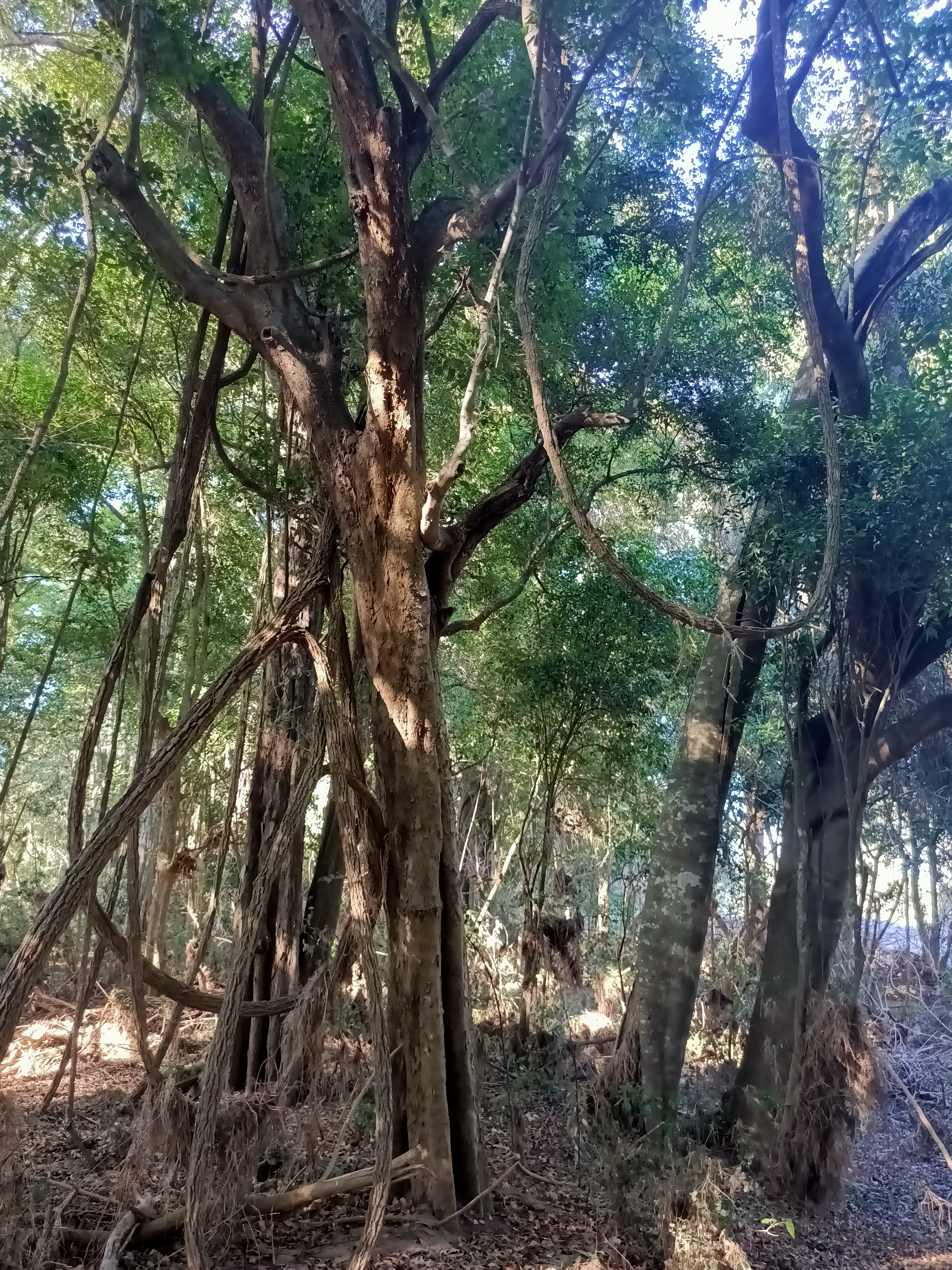
Tall trees in Coocumbac Island Nature Reserve

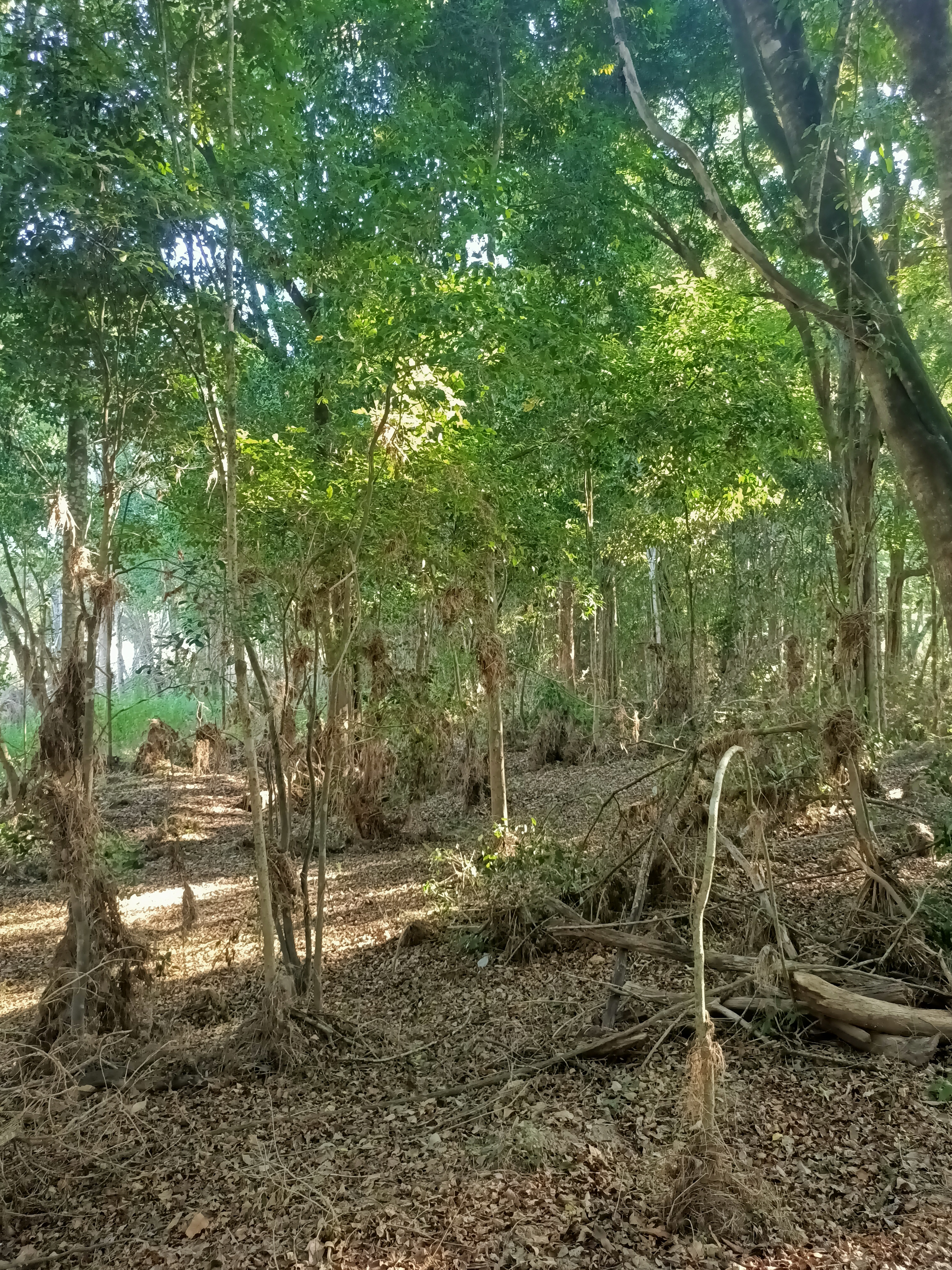
Diverse plant life and lots of shady areas in the interior of the island

Other tree species include stinging tree and the native olive. The native elm grows on the island, here at its southernmost point of natural distribution. A large native hackberry occurs on the island, 30 metres (98 ft) tall and with a trunk diameter of 1.2 metres (3 ft 11 in). Less common trees include white walnut and the Australian rose mahogany. Rainforest regeneration programs have been put in place to encourage local rainforest species and suppress the problem of invasive weeds.

==== Mangroves ====
Surrounding the island is an impressive community of two species of mangroves; grey mangrove and river mangrove.

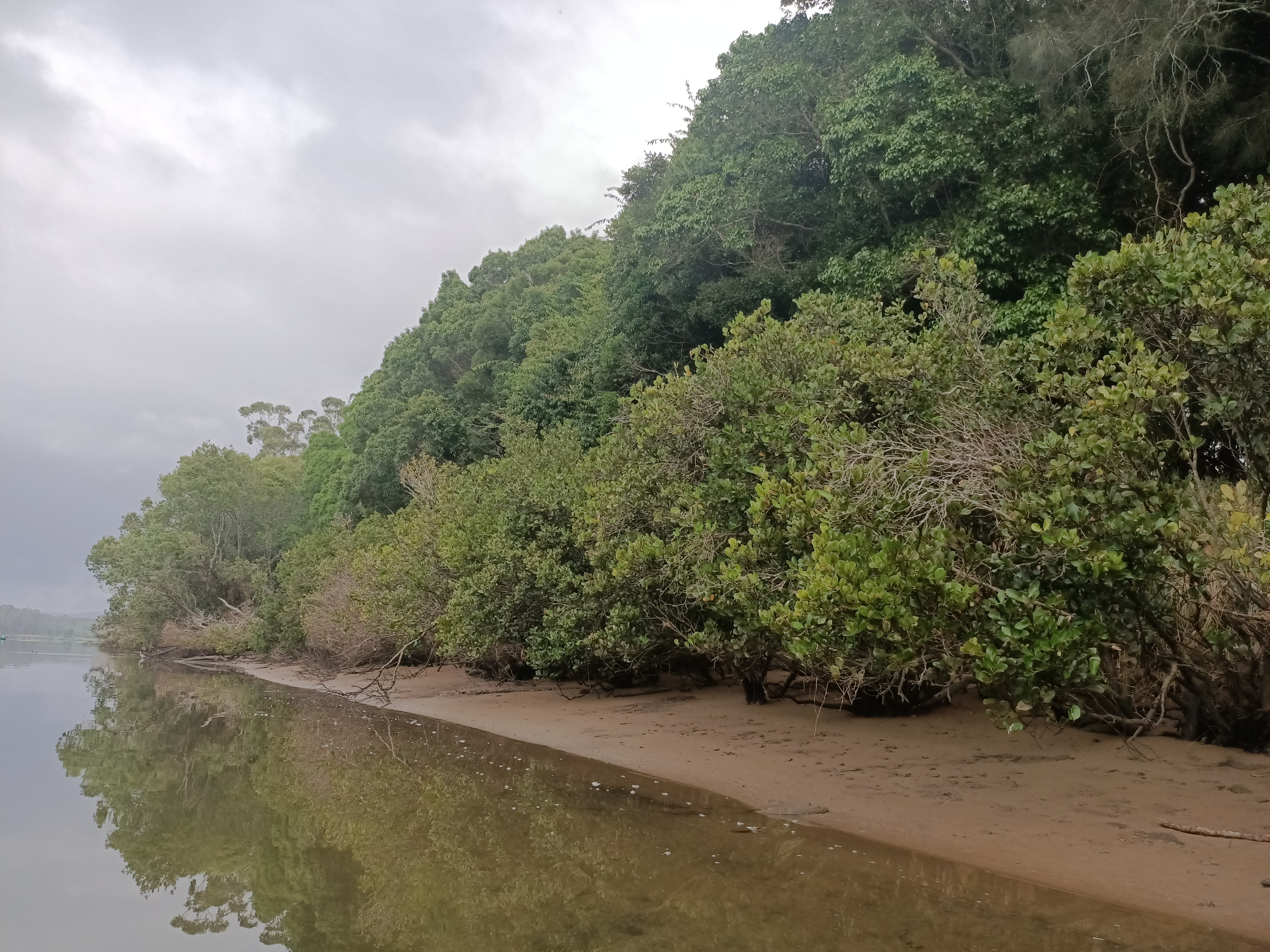
Mangroves along Coocumbac Island's shoreline, with taller forest behind

== See also ==
- Islands of New South Wales
- Protected areas of New South Wales
