= Cholmondeley Islet =

Islet in Australia

Coordinates: 11°22′26″S 143°03′29″E

Cholmondeley Islet (/ˈtʃʌmli/ CHUM-lee) is a small island in the Boydong cays Shelburne Bay in far north Queensland, Australia about 105 km north of Cape Grenville, Cape York Peninsula in the Great Barrier Reef Marine Park Queensland, Australia.

It is a part of the East Islands group, about 30 km northeast of Captain Billy Landing.

== See also ==
- List of islands of Australia
