= Coquet Island (Queensland) =

Island in Queensland, Australia

Coordinates: 14°32′28″S 144°59′31″E

- Interactive map of Coquet Island

Geography
- Location: Coral Sea
- Archipelago: Cole Islands

Administration
- Australia
- State: Queensland
- Local government area: Shire of Cook

Coquet Island is part of the Great Barrier Reef Marine Park and the easternmost island in the Cole Islands group and National Park and is about 100 km south-east of Cape Melville, Queensland.

Coquet Island is a vegetated sand cay located 25 km from the coast, well established with coconut palms and sisal which provide a habitat for a number of roosting birds and green turtles and hawksbill turtles.

The island houses a massive steel tower used for reef research or navigation.

The island covers an area of about 40 hectares.
