= Kangaroo Island (Queensland) =

Island in Queensland, Australia

Coordinates: 25.431°S 152.880°E

Kangaroo Island refers to an island in Queensland, Australia. It is located near Hervey Bay and River Heads. It divides the flow of the Susan River, causing one division to converge with Bunya Creek as it flows into the Great Sandy Strait. The island is 116 hectares in size. Kangaroo Island has recently been listed for sale.

== See also ==
- List of islands of Australia
