= Belowla Island =

Island in New South Wales, Australia

- Location within Australia

Geography
- Location: New South Wales
- Coordinates: 35°33′12″S 150°23′26″E

Administration
- Australia

Belowla Island is an island in Australia. It is located in the state of New South Wales, in the southeastern part of the country, 160 km east of the capital, Canberra.
