= Stapleton Island =

- Island
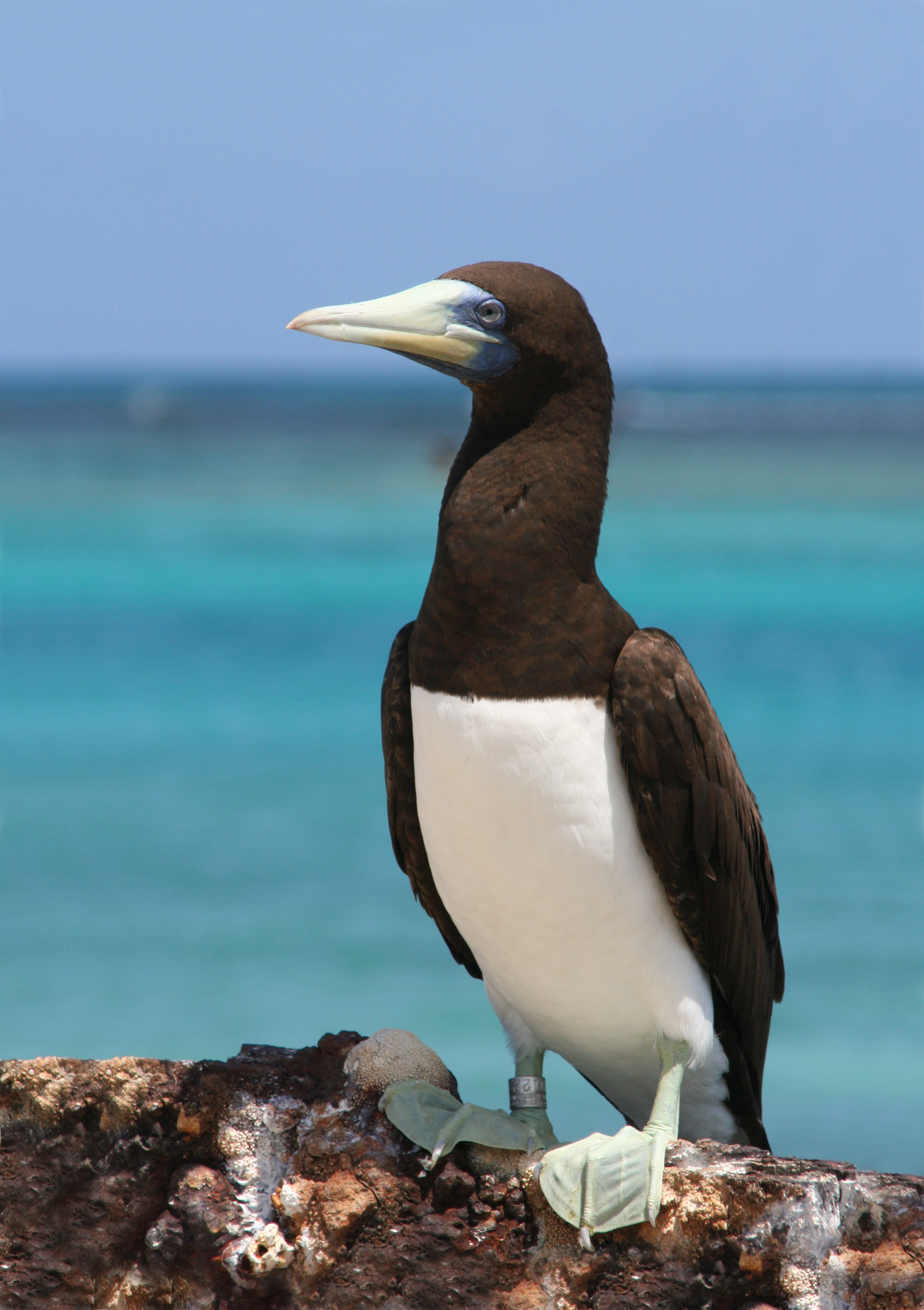
- The island is an important breeding site for brown boobies

- Stapleton Island in Australia Map
- Coordinates: 14°19′08″S 144°51′04″E
- Country: Australia
- State: Queensland

Area
  - Total: 0.0154441 sq mi (0.040000 km^{2})

Stapleton Island is a small (4 ha) island on the northern Great Barrier Reef of Far North Queensland, Australia. It lies about 40 km off Cape Melville on the east coast of the Cape York Peninsula. It is important as a nesting site for boobies and terns.

== Description ==
The island is an elongated cay, about 500 metres (1,600 feet) long with a maximum width of 100 metres (330 feet). It is constituted of coral sand and reef rubble rising to a central ridge 5 metres (16 feet) above sea level. The outer edge has a beach community of herbs and the sand ridge is dominated by low shrubs and Lepturus grass. The island is a designated Preservation Area within the Howick Group National Park with no general public access.

== Birds ==
The island has been identified by BirdLife International as an Important Bird Area (IBA) because it has supported over 1% of the world populations of brown boobies (with up to 1000 nests) and lesser crested terns (up to 9800 breeding pairs). There have also been counts of up to 10,000 breeding pairs of both bridled and sooty terns, as well as breeding records of black-naped, crested and little terns, common noddies and Australian pelicans.
