= Mangrove Islet =

Island in Victoria, Australia

Coordinates: 38°15′S 144°40′E

Mangrove Islet is a small island close to Swan Island (Victoria), Australia. It is also close to Rabbit Island. The name of the island suggests that there are mangroves on the islet. Mangrove Islet is approximately 44 meters long.
