= East Woody Island =

Island in Northern Territory, Australia

Geography
- Location: Arafura Sea, Pacific Ocean
- Coordinates: 12°09′41″S 136°45′04″E

Administration
- Australia

Demographics
- Population: 0

East Woody Island (Yolŋu: Dhamitjinya), is an island in Australia. It is located in East Arnhem Land in the Northern Territory. The closest town is Nhulunbuy. A sand spit connects the island to the Australian mainland.
