= Newton Island =

Island in Queensland, Australia

- Interactive map of Newton Island

Geography
- Location: Northern Australia
- Coordinates: 14.506°S 144.915°E
- Area: 0.43 km^{2} (0.17 sq mi)

Administration
- Australia
- State: Queensland

Newton Island is part of the Great Barrier Reef Marine Park and the southernmost island in the Howick Group National Park and is about 100 km south-east of Cape Melville, Queensland. It is around 43 hectares or 0.43 square km in size.

The island is west of Howick Island.
