= Corner Island =

Island in Victoria, Australia

- Location within South Gippsland Shire

Geography
- Location: Corner Inlet
- Coordinates: 38.8826°S 146.3196°E

Administration
- Australia
- State: Victoria

Corner Island is located in Corner Inlet Marine National Park, approximately 2.5 kilometres (1.6 mi) north of Millers Landing on Wilsons Promontory in Victoria, Australia. The island is accessible only at high tide by boat.
