= Harvey Island =

Island in Queensland, Australia

- Interactive map of Harvey Island

Geography
- Location: Northern Australia
- Coordinates: 11.968°S 143.263°E
- Archipelago: Home Islands
- Area: 0.07 km^{2} (0.027 sq mi)

Administration
- Australia
- State: Queensland

Harvey Island is an island about 1 km east of Cape Grenville in the Great Barrier Reef Marine Park Queensland, Australia, in Temple Bay about 200 km north-east of Kutini-Payamu National Park and Lockhart River on Cape York Peninsula. It is around 7 hectares or 0.07 square km in size.

This island is part of Home Islands.
