= Howie Island =

Island in Tasmania, Australia

Coordinates: 40°44′S 144°58′E

Howie Island is an island, with an area of 4.1 ha, in south-eastern Australia. It is part of the Petrel Island Group, lying in Bass Strait close to Walker and Robbins Islands in north-west Tasmania. It is surrounded by extensive mudflats.

== Fauna ==
Recorded breeding seabird species include Pacific gull and Caspian tern. Rabbits are also present.
