= Watson Island (Queensland) =

Island in Queensland, Australia

Native name: Warson Island
- Interactive map of Watson Island

Geography
- Location: Northern Australia
- Coordinates: 14.465°S 144.893°E
- Area: 0.09 km^{2} (0.035 sq mi)

Administration
- Australia
- State: Queensland

Watson Island is part of the Great Barrier Reef Marine Park and the southernmost island in the Howick Group National Park and is about 100 km south-east of Cape Melville, Queensland. It is around 9 hectares or 0.09 square km in size.

The island is north-west of Howick Island.
