= Paddy Island =

Island in Queensland, Australia

Coordinates: 24.82861°S 152.36722°E

Paddy Island was an island in the Burnett River, northeast of the city of Bundaberg in Queensland, Australia. It holds historical significance and has been a site of various events over the years. Originally an island in the Burnett River, Paddy Island has seen frontier conflicts involving squatters and station hands from surrounding properties, resulting in significant confrontations with Aboriginal communities in the area.

== Etymology ==
Fragment from Survey Plan W37.55 of the Burnett River and Eight Portions of Land Therein, Applied for Under the "Sugar and Coffee Regulations" County of Cook; 29 September 1868.

On a survey plan of the Burnett River transmitted to the Queensland Surveyor General on Tuesday, 29 September 1868, the island was referenced as Coodes Island by the District Surveyor John Charlton Thompson (1827–1878).

== The Death of Blaxland and the Taribelang Tragedy ==
At Tirroan (later Gin Gin) Station on Monday, 4 June 1849, two young brothers, John and Peter Pegg, were out shepherding sheep when they were speared to death by local Taribelang clansmen.

Gregory Blaxland Jr, the seventh and youngest son of the pioneer, farmer and explorer Gregory Blaxland (17 June 1778 – 1 January 1853), "organized a punitive party to deal with the savages", which culminated in a bloody skirmish at the site of Gibson and Howes' sugar plantation at 'the Cedars', south of Bundaberg.

"The blacks were shown no mercy, but (they) .. put up a mighty fight against the firearms of the whites, they of course having no better weapons than spears."

Blaxland Jr was "regarded (by the Taribelang clansmen) as their chief enemy as all actions against the blacks was directed by him." When the opportunity for retaliation presented itself, Gregory Blaxland Jr. was ambushed, abducted, and violently clubbed to death at his pastoral station in early August 1850.

A retaliatory party "was organized among all (the) settlers and their employees, and they set out on their mission of revenge." Guided by a 'friendly gin', the "fugitive blacks were tracked down the Burnett River, where they had foregathered at a place now called (Waterview Station) Paddy's Island, not far from the mouth of the river."

Following these events, it is estimated that the death toll numbered in the hundreds. Many were slaughtered whilst trying to cross from the west bank of the Burnett River to Paddy Island.

Today, the custodianship of Paddy's Island is a point of contention between neighbouring tribes and a number of traditional owners.
