= Tern Island (Queensland) =

Island in Queensland, Australia

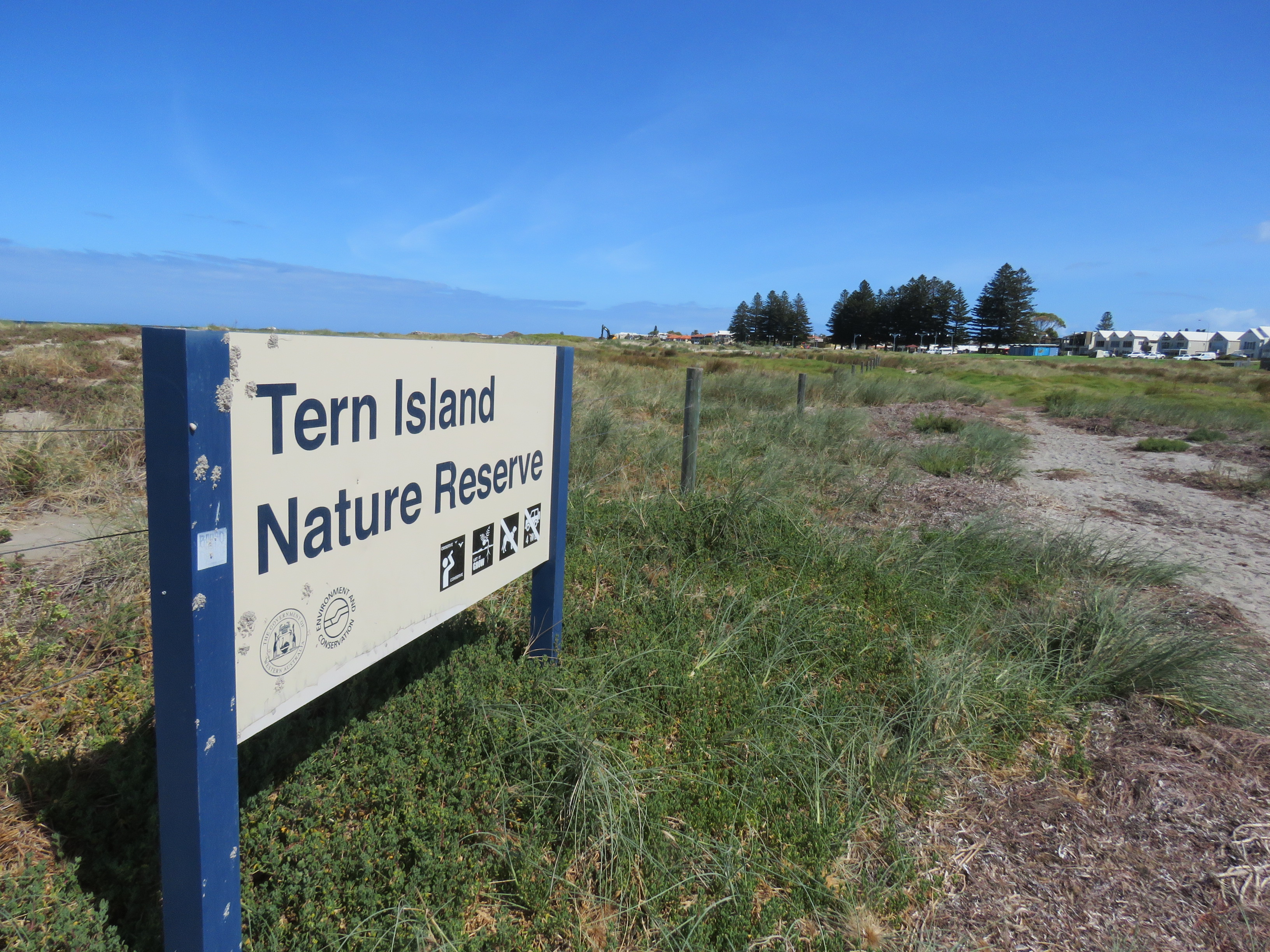
- Tern Island Nature Reserve
- Interactive map of Tern Island

Geography
- Coordinates: 11.997°S 142.765°E
- Area: 0.08 km^{2} (0.031 sq mi)

Administration
- Australia
- State: Queensland

Tern island is an island a few hundred metres north of Tern Cliffs and the Apudthama National Park in the Great Barrier Reef Marine Park Queensland, Australia, in the Cape York Peninsula about 40 km southeast of Bamaga.
