= Rocky Point Island =

Island in Queensland, Australia

- Interactive map of Rocky Point Island

Geography
- Location: Northern Australia
- Coordinates: 14.232°S 144.578°E

Administration
- Australia
- State: Queensland

Rocky Point Island is part of the Great Barrier Reef Marine Park, 10 km east of Cape Melville, Queensland. It's known for its scenic views and wildlife sightings.
