= Pigeon Island (North Queensland) =

Island in Queensland, Australia

- Interactive map of Pigeon Island

Geography
- Location: Northern Australia
- Area: 0.025 km^{2} (0.0097 sq mi)

Administration
- Australia
- State: Queensland
- LGA: Cook

Pigeon Island is part of the Great Barrier Reef Marine Park in Weymouth Bay north of Lockhart River and Kutini-Payamu National Park Cape York Peninsula, Queensland. It is around 2.5 hectares in size.

The island is a few hundred metres from the mouth of the Pascoe River.
