= Big Sandy Petrel Island =

Island in Tasmania, Australia

Coordinates: 40°34′S 144°56′E

Big Sandy Petrel Island is an island game reserve with an area of 15.2 ha, in south-eastern Australia. It is part of the Petrel Island Group, lying in Bass Strait close to Walker and Robbins Islands in north-west Tasmania.

== Fauna ==
Recorded breeding seabird, shorebird and waterbird species include little penguin, short-tailed shearwater, Pacific gull, sooty oystercatcher, pied oystercatcher and Cape Barren goose. Tiger snakes are present.
