= Horseshoe Island (Queensland) =

Island in Queensland, Australia

Horseshoe Island, Queensland
- Location within Queensland

Geography
- Location: Queensland
- Coordinates: 16.99093681°S 139.26143066°E
- Adjacent to: Gulf of Carpentaria
- Length: 2,290 m (7510 ft)

Administration
- Australia
- State: Queensland

Demographics
- Population: 0 (2016)

Horseshoe Island is one of the South Wellesley Islands, on the Queensland side of the Gulf of Carpentaria, northern Australia. It is located 3,958 m (2.459 mi) northwest of Allen Island.
