= Kangaroo Island (Tasmania) =

Island in Tasmania, Australia

- Location within Tasmania

Geography
- Location: Bass Strait
- Coordinates: 40°41′24″S 144°49′48″E
- Archipelago: Petrel Group
- Area: 125 ha (310 acres)

Administration
- Australia
- State: Tasmania
- LGA: Circular Head Council

Demographics
- Population: unpopulated

The Kangaroo Island, part of the Petrel Group, is a 125-hectare (310-acre) unpopulated island in the Bass Strait near Robbins Island, in north-west Tasmania, in south-eastern Australia.

The island has been used for grazing cattle and is surrounded by extensive mudflats.

== Fauna ==
Pied oystercatchers breed on the island, which is also home to the Tasmanian pademelon. The island and its mudflats are important for feeding and roosting waders.
