= Big Stony Petrel Island =

Coordinates: 40°34′S 144°56′E

Big Stony Petrel Island is an island game reserve with an area of 7.2 ha, in south-eastern Australia. It is part of the Petrel Island Group, lying in Bass Strait close to Walker and Robbins Islands in north-west Tasmania.

== Fauna ==
Recorded breeding seabird, shorebird and waterbird species include little penguin, short-tailed shearwater, common diving-petrel, white-faced storm-petrel, Pacific gull, silver gull, sooty oystercatcher, black-faced cormorant, Caspian tern and Cape Barren goose.
