= South West Petrel Island =

Island in Tasmania, Australia

Coordinates: 40°34′S 144°55′E

South West Petrel Island is an island game reserve with an area of 4 ha, part of the Petrel Island Group, lying in Bass Strait close to Walker and Robbins Islands in north-west Tasmania, Australia.

== Fauna ==
Recorded breeding seabird, shorebird and waterbird species include little penguin, short-tailed shearwater, common diving-petrel, white-faced storm-petrel, Pacific gull, silver gull, sooty oystercatcher and Cape Barren goose.
