= Morris Island (Queensland) =

- Interactive map of Morris Island

Geography
- Location: Northern Australia
- Coordinates: 13.494°S 143.723°E
- Area: 0.02 km^{2} (0.0077 sq mi)

Administration
- Australia
- State: Queensland

There are two Morris Islands within 200 km of each other.

Morris Island-South is part of the Great Barrier Reef Marine Park and the southernmost island in the Cole Islands group and national park and is about 100 km south east of Cape Melville, Queensland. It is around 2 hectares or 0.02 square km in size.

Morris Island is a vegetated sand cay located 15 km from the coast, well established with coconut palms and sisal that provide a habitat for a number of roosting birds, green and hawksbill turtles.

This island is used by a number of tour operators.

Morris Island-North is 200 km north west of this island and east of Coen in the Claremont Isles.
