= Little Stony Petrel Island =

Island in Tasmania, Australia

Coordinates: 40°34′S 144°55′E

Little Stony Petrel Island is an island game reserve with an area of 4 ha, in south-eastern Australia. It is part of the Petrel Island Group, lying in Bass Strait close to Walker and Robbins Islands in north-west Tasmania.

== Fauna ==
Recorded breeding seabird and shorebird species include little penguin, short-tailed shearwater, common diving-petrel, white-faced storm-petrel, Pacific gull and sooty oystercatcher.
