= Picnic Island =

Small island east of Tasmania

Coordinates: 42°07′S 148°16′E

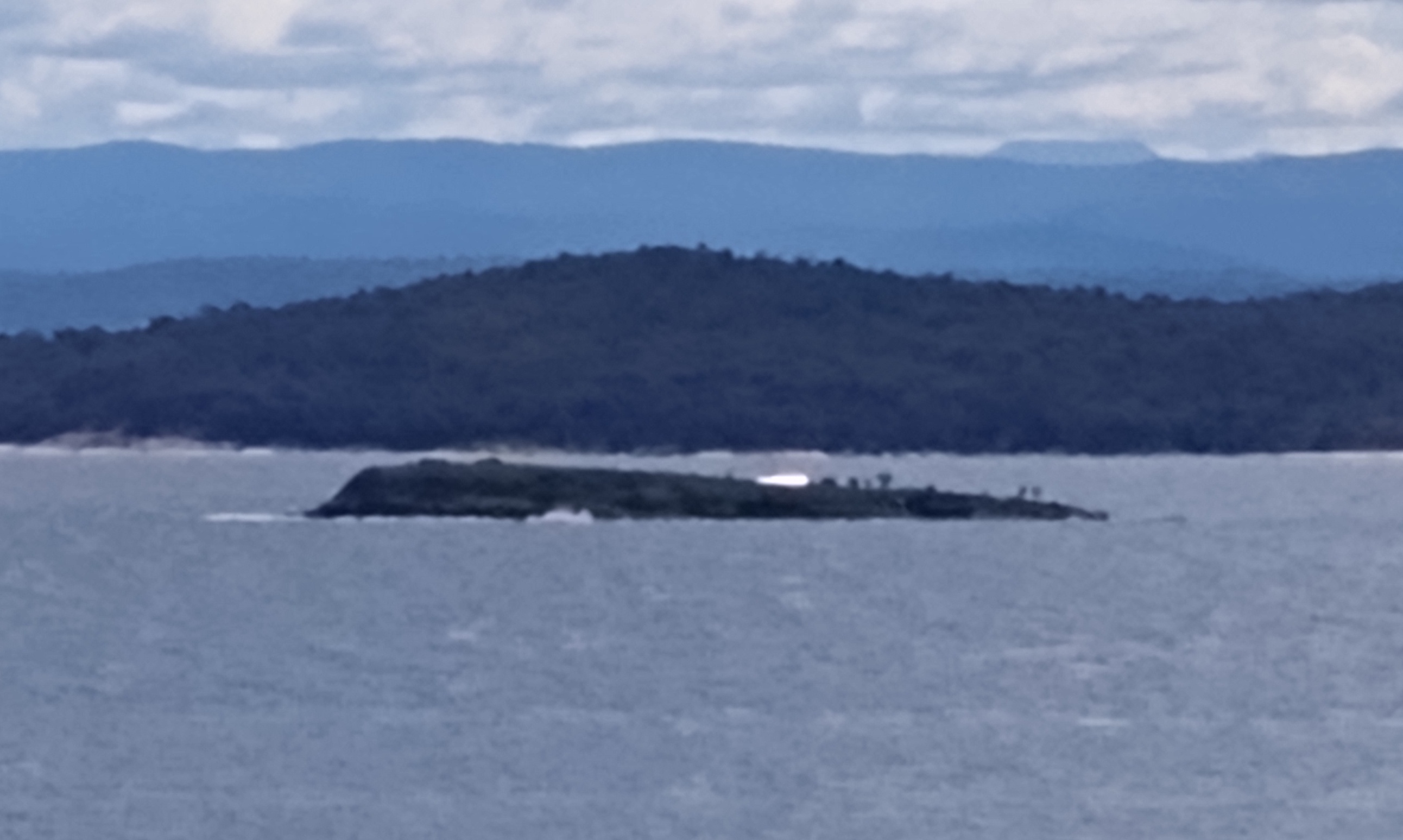
Picnic Island

Picnic Island is a small, privately owned, rocky island, with an area of about one hectare, part of the Schouten Island Group, lying close to the eastern coast of Tasmania near the Freycinet Peninsula. It is composed of sandstone overlying granite.

In November 2020, the business operator said the use of the island's accommodations was normally about half from the Melbourne market and a quarter each from Sydney and Brisbane.

== Fauna ==
Recorded breeding seabird species are little penguin and short-tailed shearwater. The spotted skink is present.
