= Walker Island (Northern Tasmania) =

Island in Tasmania, Australia

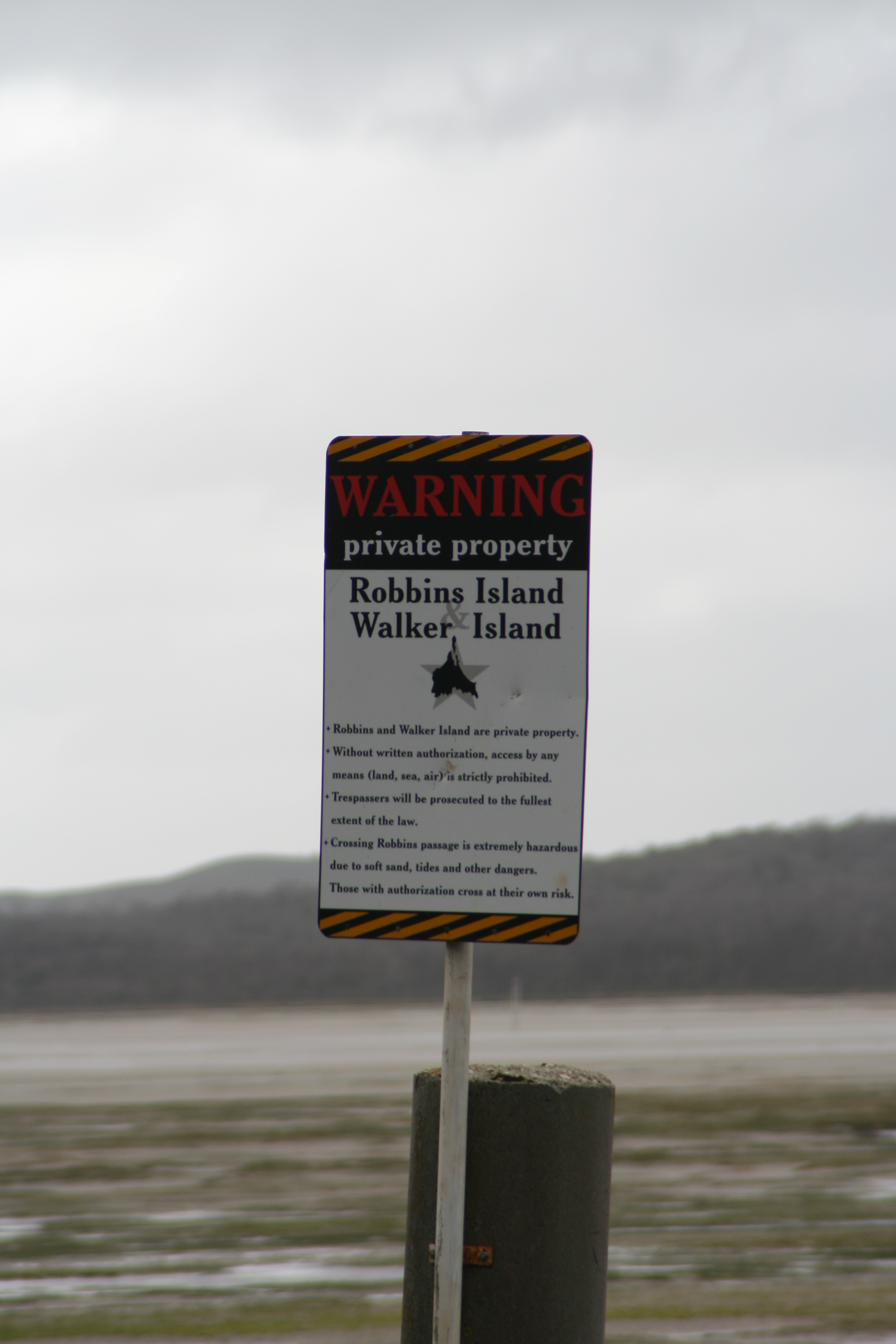
- Sign at crossing to Robbins and Walker Islands.

- Location within Tasmania

Geography
- Location: Bass Strait
- Coordinates: 40°35′59″S 144°55′47″E
- Area: 700 ha (1,700 acres)

Administration
- Australia
- State: Tasmania
- LGA: Circular Head Council

Additional information
- Time zone: AEST (UTC+10)
  - Summer (DST): AEDT (UTC+11)
- Privately-owned

The Walker Island, sometimes also Walker's Island, is a 700-hectare (1,700-acre) island located in Bass Strait, lying off the northwest coast of Tasmania, Australia. The island, separated from the Tasmanian mainland by a highly tidal area known as Robbins Passage, lies north of the adjacent Robbins Island.

Access to Walker Island is available via the Walker Island Airport. In 1916, the Holyman family bought the island.

The island, together with the adjacent Robbins Island, has been privately owned by the Hammond family since 1961. They came into possession of the island after Eugene Hammond married Mary Holyman and the couple bought the island from her parents. In 2016 it was reported that the Hammond family graze approximately 7,000 head of Wagyu cattle on both islands, and mainland Tasmania.

HMAS Riawe had her commercial origins in the Robbins and Walker Islands prior to her 1942 requisition by the Department of the Navy for duties with the Naval Auxiliary Patrol during World War II.

== See also ==
- List of islands of Tasmania
