= Granite Island (Victoria) =

Island in Victoria, Australia

- Location within South Gippsland Shire

Geography
- Location: Corner Inlet
- Coordinates: 38°48′25″S 146°23′36″E
- Area: 1.4 ha (3.5 acres)
- Length: 150 m (490 ft)
- Width: 90 m (300 ft)
- Highest elevation: 30 m (100 ft)

Administration
- Australia
- State: Victoria

Granite Island is a small, uninhabited granite island in Corner Inlet near the northern coast of Wilsons Promontory, in Victoria, Australia.

The island is part of Wilsons Promontory National Park, the Corner Inlet Important Bird Area, and the Corner Inlet Ramsar site. The surrounding waters are within Corner Inlet Marine National Park and Corner Inlet Marine and Coastal Park.
