= Agnes River =

Agnes River may refer to:

Australia

- Agnes River (Australia)

Canada

- Agnes River (Spanish River), in Sudbury District, Ontario, Canada
