= Sunday Island (Victoria) =

Island of Victoria, Australia

Coordinates: 38°42′41″S 146°37′44″E

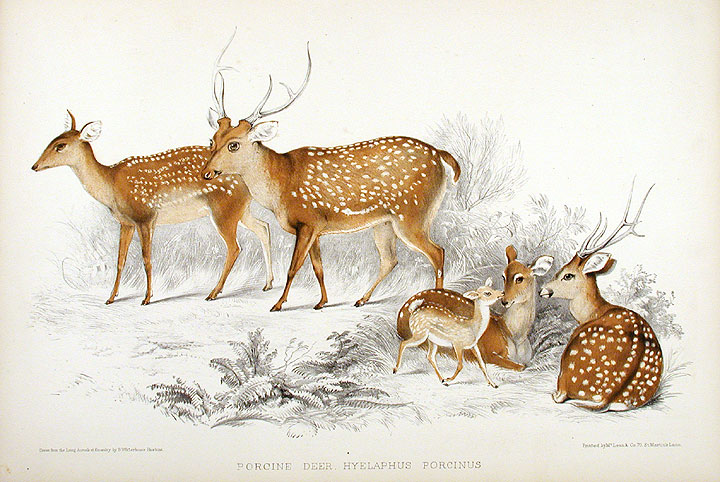
Sunday Island is a privately owned game reserve for the conservation of Hog Deer offering a range of outdoor lifestyle and recreational opportunities for members of the Para Park Co-operative Game Reserve Ltd

Sunday Island is a low-lying, sandy, 16.2 km^{2} barrier island on the coast of Victoria, Australia. It is about 8 km long by 3 km wide and rises to a maximum height of no more than 15 m above mean sea level. It lies in Corner Inlet, South Gippsland, 4 km south-west of Port Albert and 215 km south-east of Melbourne. Although the island is surrounded by the Nooramunga Marine and Coastal Park, it is private freehold property, a game reserve owned by the Para Park Co-operative Game Reserve Limited. It contains an airstrip and a jetty as well as accommodation buildings for resident caretakers, visiting members, and their guests.

The island offers members of the co-operative and their guests a range of outdoor lifestyle and recreational opportunities such as bushwalking, photography, fishing, and bird-watching in addition to hunting opportunities and opportunities to work closely with the deer in the natural environment.

== History ==
Sunday Island lies within the traditional lands of the Brataolong clan of the Gunai nation. European settlers arrived in the area in the early 1840s and the island has a history of being grazed since at least 1860. A pilot station operated from 1900 to 1922, while a homestead was occupied from 1918 to 1938. The island carried around 350 head of cattle, which were later replaced by up to 2200 sheep.

=== Para Park Co-operative ===
The Para Park Co-operative Game Reserve Limited was established in 1965 by 200 people, most of whom were members of the Sporting Shooters Association of Australia, in order to raise A$40,000 for the purchase of the island for the conservation, study and sustainable hunting of Hog Deer. The number of members is still about 200; membership is limited by a waiting list, and includes an annual work commitment. All accommodation on the island is limited to a small area at the eastern end, with the rest of the island left wild except for management tracks, improved pasture areas, and dams. Hunting is seasonal, with quotas determined by management culling needs. Permits to hunt are restricted to members and are balloted. The cooperative has supplied Hog Deer stock to the Blond Bay State Game Reserve in East Gippsland.

The aims and objectives of the Co-operative are to:

- maintain the island in perpetuity as a game management and hunting area
- conserve the game animals and birds present and complement these with other suitable and desirable game species
- control noxious animals and birds
- carry out conservation projects that will improve the habitat and game carrying capacity of the island
- provide a controlled area for wildlife research
- provide and maintain facilities for the benefit of members
- undertake, or assist with, projects beneficial to wildlife conservation and to the sports of hunting and shooting

== Flora and fauna ==
Sunday Island vegetation includes stands of manna gum, coastal banksia, coastal tea tree and golden wattle, with tussock grass and bracken. The island supports swamp wallabies as well as managed populations of the introduced hog deer and fallow deer. The surrounding intertidal mudflats form an important feeding habitat for thousands of migratory waders that visit Corner Inlet each year.
