= Goon Nure =

- Town
- Coordinates: 37°58′37″S 147°35′14″E
- Country: Australia
- State: Victoria
- LGA: Shire of East Gippsland
- Location: 277.5 km (172.4 mi) E of Melbourne; 19.9 km (12.4 mi) E of Bairnsdale

Government
  - State electorate: Gippsland East
  - Federal division: Gippsland

Population
  - Total: 119 (2016 census)
- Postcode: 3875

Goon Nure is a locality in the East Gippsland region of Victoria, Australia.

== History ==
=== 19th century ===
Crown land was first made available for selection in the parish of Goon Nure in April 1865. The area was described as being watered by swamps, on the shore of Lake Victoria and between 8 and 12 miles from Bairnsdale. Most of the land suitable for grazing or farming had been taken by the 1880’s.

A 647-hectare property called Romawi was planned as a health resort on the shores of Lake Victoria in 1880. A jetty was built and tenders were called to produce 250,000 bricks to build a large hotel. However the project did not go ahead.

A town site was declared in 1886. Allotments were surveyed and offered for sale but few were taken up.

A temporary schoolroom was built by parents in 1887. This was replaced by a mobile classroom in 1889. It remained in use till 1930 when it was destroyed by fire.

A Presbyterian church was built at a cost of £100 in 1892 on land donated by J.F. Spillman and was in use by December of that year.

Efforts were made in the 1890s to get a railway branch line to serve the area.

=== 20th century ===
The Goon Nure post office opened in 1900.

The area experienced damaging bushfires in 1921 and 1939.

Oil was discovered in the 1920’s, and later, gas. However well-bores drilled to measure the extent of the oil and gas fields proved unsatisfactory.

SEC mains power reached the area in 1961.

A 2000 ha reserve known as the Blond Bay State Game Reserve was proclaimed by Victorian government in September 1970. It is located on the north shore of Lake Victoria. Duck, quail and hog deer are hunted there during proscribed seasons.

=== 21st century ===
At the 2021 census, Goon Nure had a population of 137.
