= Bairnsdale =

Bairnsdale Wy-yung
- City
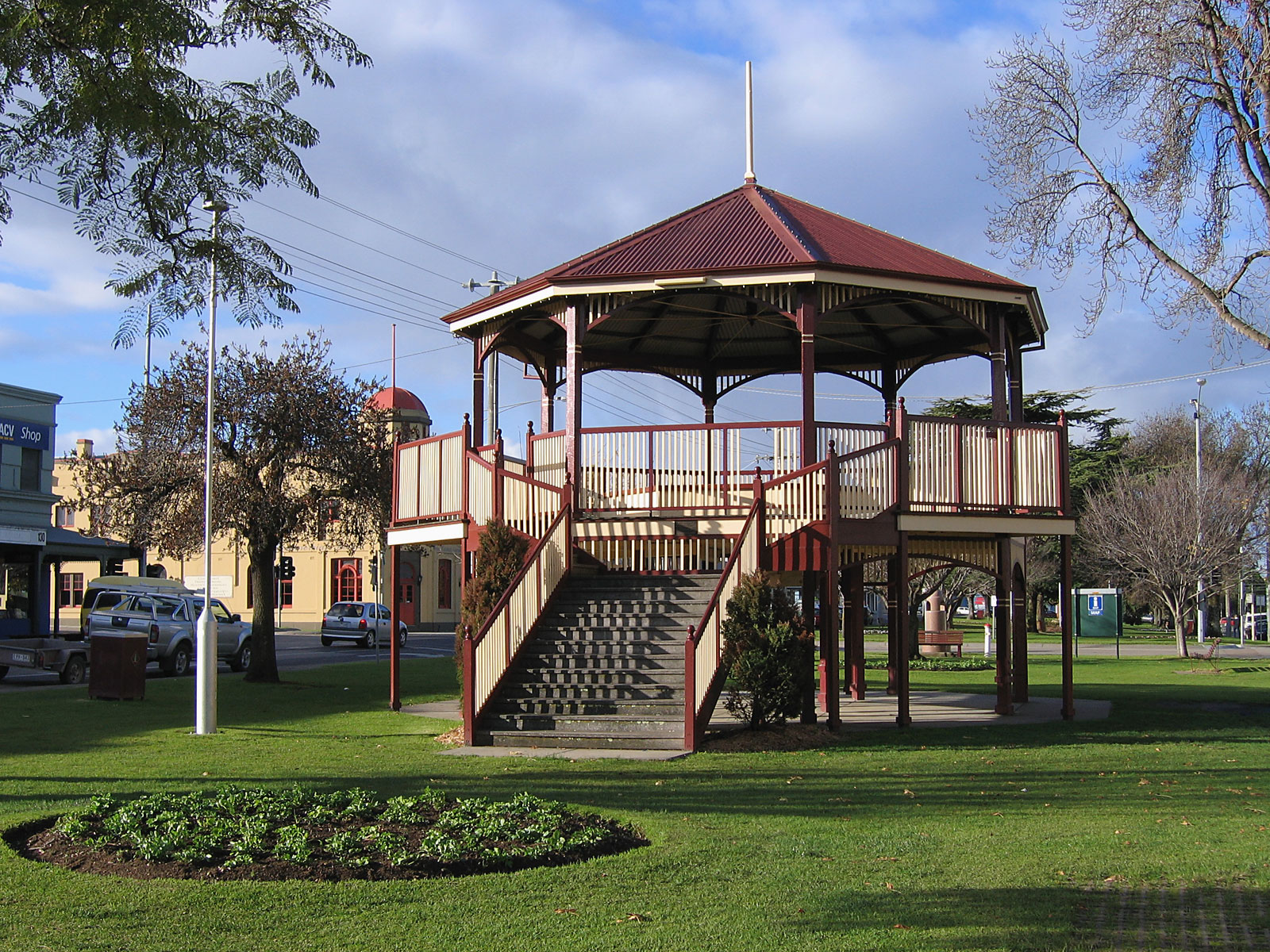
- Bairnsdale Rotunda, located on the central garden strip of the Princes Highway, Bairnsdale, Victoria.

- Interactive map of Bairnsdale
- Coordinates: 37°49′39″S 147°37′30″E
- Country: Australia
- State: Victoria
- LGA: Shire of East Gippsland
- Location: 279 km (173 mi) E of Melbourne; 40 km (25 mi) NW of Lakes Entrance; 114 km (71 mi) NE of Traralgon
- Established: 1860

Government
  - State electorate: Gippsland East
  - Federal division: Gippsland

Area (2016 urban)
  - Total: 155 km^{2} (60 sq mi)
- Elevation: 49 m (161 ft)

Population
  - Total: 17,666 (2023 census)
  - Density: 114.0/km^{2} (295.2/sq mi)
- Postcode: 3875
- Mean max temp: 20.1 °C (68.2 °F)
- Mean min temp: 8.3 °C (46.9 °F)
- Annual rainfall: 643.6 mm (25.34 in)
Localities around Bairnsdale
| Wy Yung | Wy Yung | Lucknow |
| Hillside | Bairnsdale | East Bairnsdale |
| East Bairnsdale | Goon Nure, Forge Creek | Eagle Point |

Bairnsdale (locally /ˈbɛərnzdeɪl/) (Ganai: Wy-yung) is a city in East Gippsland, Victoria, Australia, situated in a region traditionally inhabited by the Tatungalung clan of the Gunaikurnai people. The estimated population of the Bairnsdale urban area was 17,666 at June 2023. The city serves as a major regional centre of eastern Victoria, alongside Traralgon and Sale, acting as the commercial hub for the East Gippsland region and the seat of local government for the Shire of East Gippsland. Bairnsdale was first proclaimed as a shire on 16 July 1868 and later elevated to city status on 14 July 1990.

== History ==
=== Indigenous heritage ===
The Gunaikurnai people are the traditional owners of Gippsland, including the region where Bairnsdale is located. There are approximately 3,000 Gunaikurnai people, whose traditional territory encompasses both coastal and inland areas extending to the southern slopes of the Victorian Alps. The Gunaikurnai consist of five major clans, including the Tatungalung, who are recognized as the traditional custodians of the Bairnsdale area.

The Ganai (or Kurnai) word "Wy-yung" refers to a type of duck, specifically the black swan, which is often associated with waterfowl in Indigenous Australian languages, while the Bairnsdale backwater area is known as Kauan, meaning echidna.

=== European settlement ===
The origin of the city's name is uncertain. It was possibly Bernisdale, with "Bernis-dale" originating from "Bjorn's dale, or glen", which indicates the Viking origins of the Skye village. Legend has it that Macleod was so impressed by the large number of children on the run, the children of his stockmen, that he called it Bairns-dale, or "valley of the children".

In 1876, the Bairnsdale Shire, which grew to become one of the largest in Victoria in the 1880s, was led out of administrative chaos by former shire auditor and shipping agent Herman Bredt. He had also acted as a mine manager for the nearby Sons of Freedom mine. German-born Bredt was the father of Bertha Bredt, who married the famous Australian poet and writer Henry Lawson. Prior to this, she had worked at the Bairnsdale Hospital. During this period, Bairnsdale's Main Street was fashioned, though it remained unsealed, leading to issues with dust in the summer and mud in the winter. Asphalting did not take place until 1883. Nicholson Street was formed in 1877, followed by MacLeod Street in 1879.

== Geography ==
Bairnsdale is sited on a bend of the Mitchell River, with the river flowing from the west along the northern edge of the town, before turning south to flow along the eastern edge, although suburbs are now found across the river to both north and east, e.g. Wy Yung, Eastwood and Lucknow.

Mount Taylor is a mountain located just north of Bairnsdale and is a well-known landmark in the region, visible from many miles away, and holds historical significance dating back to the mid-19th century gold rush era.

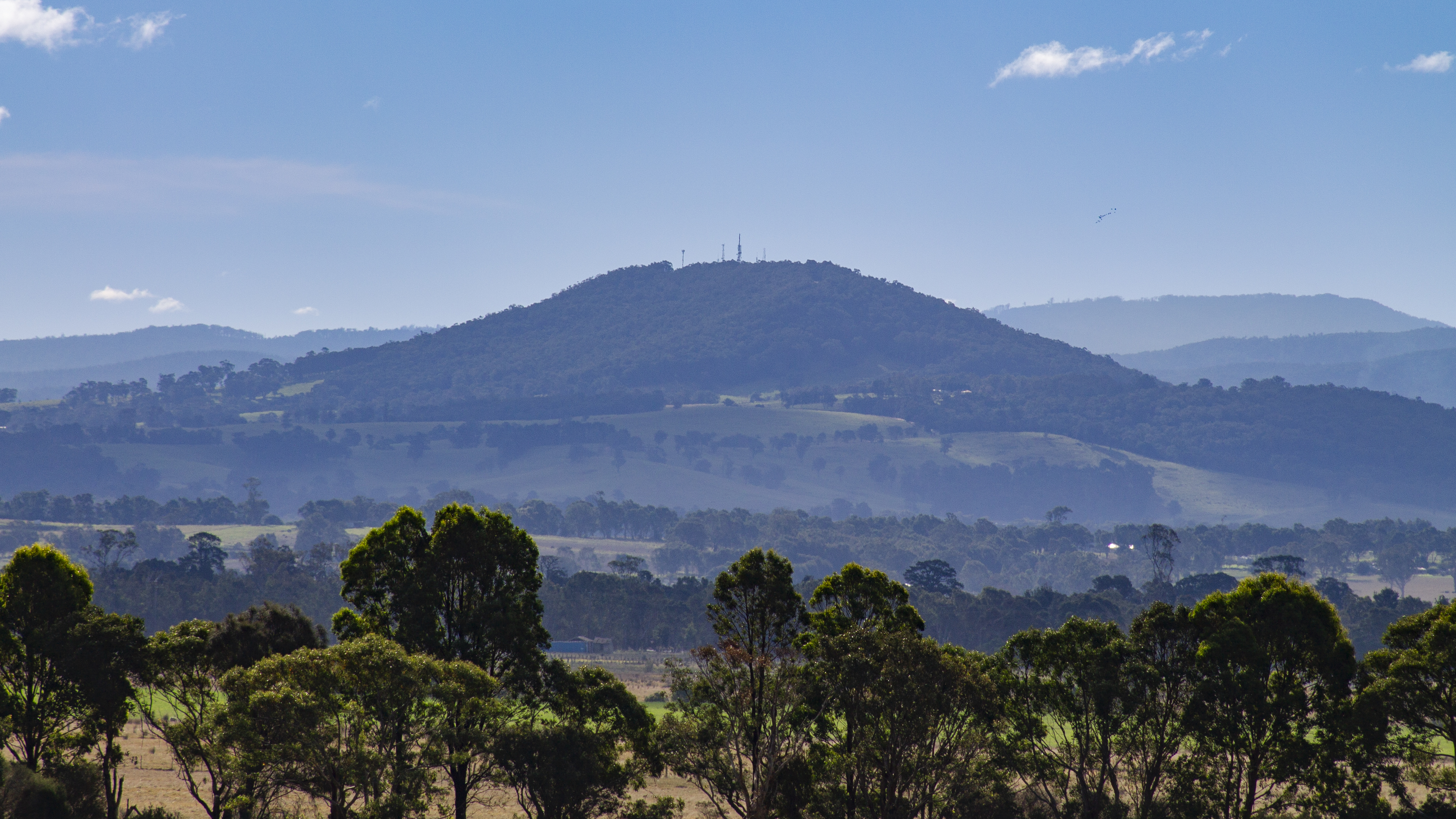
Mount Taylor

The area surrounding Mount Taylor was heavily impacted by the discovery of gold in local creeks and rivers in 1857, leading to extensive prospecting activities. This resulted in the establishment of the township of Bullumwaal, formerly known as Allanvale and later renamed in 1870. The name "Bullumwaal" is derived from an Aboriginal word believed to mean 'two spears', symbolizing the nearby mountains of Mount Lookout and Mount Taylor.

According to Hal Porter's account found in Echoes of the Victorian culture-clash frontier, John Davidson Smith and his son John Dudley Smith engaged in a legal dispute with John Loughnan and Frederick Taylor, the latter being the namesake of Mount Taylor. Taylor was involved in several racial conflicts during the late 1830s, including the Murdering Gully massacre.

=== Geology ===
Mount Taylor stands as a prominent geological feature in the Bairnsdale area and within the expansive Great Dividing Range. Over countless millennia, the geological formation of Mount Taylor and its surroundings has undergone a complex evolution, reflecting the dynamic forces that have shaped south-eastern Australia's geological history.

The area comprises Devonian granitic formations, indicating its ancient origins from significant geological processes. The geological narrative of eastern Victoria, where Mount Taylor resides, unfolds across an expanse of over 500 million years.

A comprehensive geological survey of Victoria's Great Dividing Range reveals a distinct north-south alignment in its bedrock, a vestige of the bygone epochs of plate tectonics. This enduring geological framework, coupled with ongoing tectonic activity, contributes to the dynamic topography witnessed in the eastern Victorian landscape, including the Australian Alps.

=== Soil and vegetation ===
The soils in the Mount Taylor area are primarily red and brown gradational and duplex soils. These soils support diverse native vegetation, including species of Eucalyptus such as E. albens, E. polyanthemos, E. globoidea, E. muellerana, E. baxteri, and E. macrorhyncha. The vegetation types range from dry sclerophyll forests to wet sclerophyll forests in moister areas, reflecting the varied climatic conditions across the terrain.

=== Land use and deterioration ===
The primary land use around Mount Taylor includes conservation, forestry, recreation, and water supply. The area is managed for both its ecological value and its resources. However, the region is susceptible to various forms of land deterioration, including sheet, rill, and gully erosion, as well as mass movement, particularly in disturbed areas such as roads and cleared lands. The region around Mount Taylor experiences significant rainfall, ranging between 700 and 1200 mm per annum, influencing both the soil profiles and the types of vegetation that thrive in the area.

=== Mitchell River ===
The Mitchell River flows into Lake King and Jones Bay at Eagle Point Bluff. The Mitchell, Tambo and Nicholson Rivers deliver a combined discharge of 1.1 gigalitres per year into the lakes system. The Strategic Management Plan quotes that about 100,000 tonnes of suspended solids (excluding bottom sediments) are estimated to enter the Gippsland Lakes each year from the catchments of the Mitchell, Tambo and Nicholson Rivers. Sediment loads from the western catchments (discharging to Lake Wellington) deliver two to three times the nutrient and sediment loads than from the eastern catchments (Mitchell, Nicholson and Tambo Rivers). Comparison of aerial photographs spanning 1935 to 1997 demonstrate that the vast majority of shorelines are eroding at an average of less than 10 cm per year.

The lower reaches of the Latrobe River, Thomson River and Mitchell River flow into the Gippsland Lakes and have extensive floodplains in which there are large wetlands, often separated by natural levees from the main river channels.

The Mitchell River flats were always prone to flooding, and 1891 bore witness to the flood that was only second in extent to the great floods of 1870. The biggest floods recorded were in 1893–94, with them being 76 mm higher than the 1870 water levels. All floods caused the township great suffering, with loss of life, infrastructure and crops. The flooding that occurred in the 1893–94 was notable for the gallantry of Patrick Piggott and George Brooks who both worked to rescue people. However, on their last trip their boat tipped as they moored it and both men were swept into the river and drowned. A witness remonstrated that; "…to the very last, they fought bravely for their lives against fearful odds". Both men are remembered on a marble tablet installed at the Mechanics' Hall (The Bairnsdale Library).

The Mitchell delta is represented as a type-L under the Ramsar wetland type classification framework, which means that it is a permanent inland delta. The Mitchell delta is a classic form of digitate delta (from Latin digitātus, having finger or toes) and is located near the western shoreline of Lake King at Eagle Point Bluff, extending into the lake as silt jetties formed by alluvial deposition of sediment. The Mitchell delta represents one of the finest examples of this type of landform in the world and is a site deemed of international geomorphological significance and is one of the finest examples of a classic digitate delta in the world.

A colony of nationally threatened grey-headed flying foxes (pteropus poliocephalus) roosts along the river in poplars adjacent to Riverine Street. The native bats pollinate over 100 species of native trees and plants and have declined across their range by over 95% since 1900. Their long-distance movement of floral genetic material reduces the in-breeding of trees and help produce strong timber. With a high mortality rate and low reproduction, considerable efforts are being devoted to the bats' conservation.

=== Wetlands ===
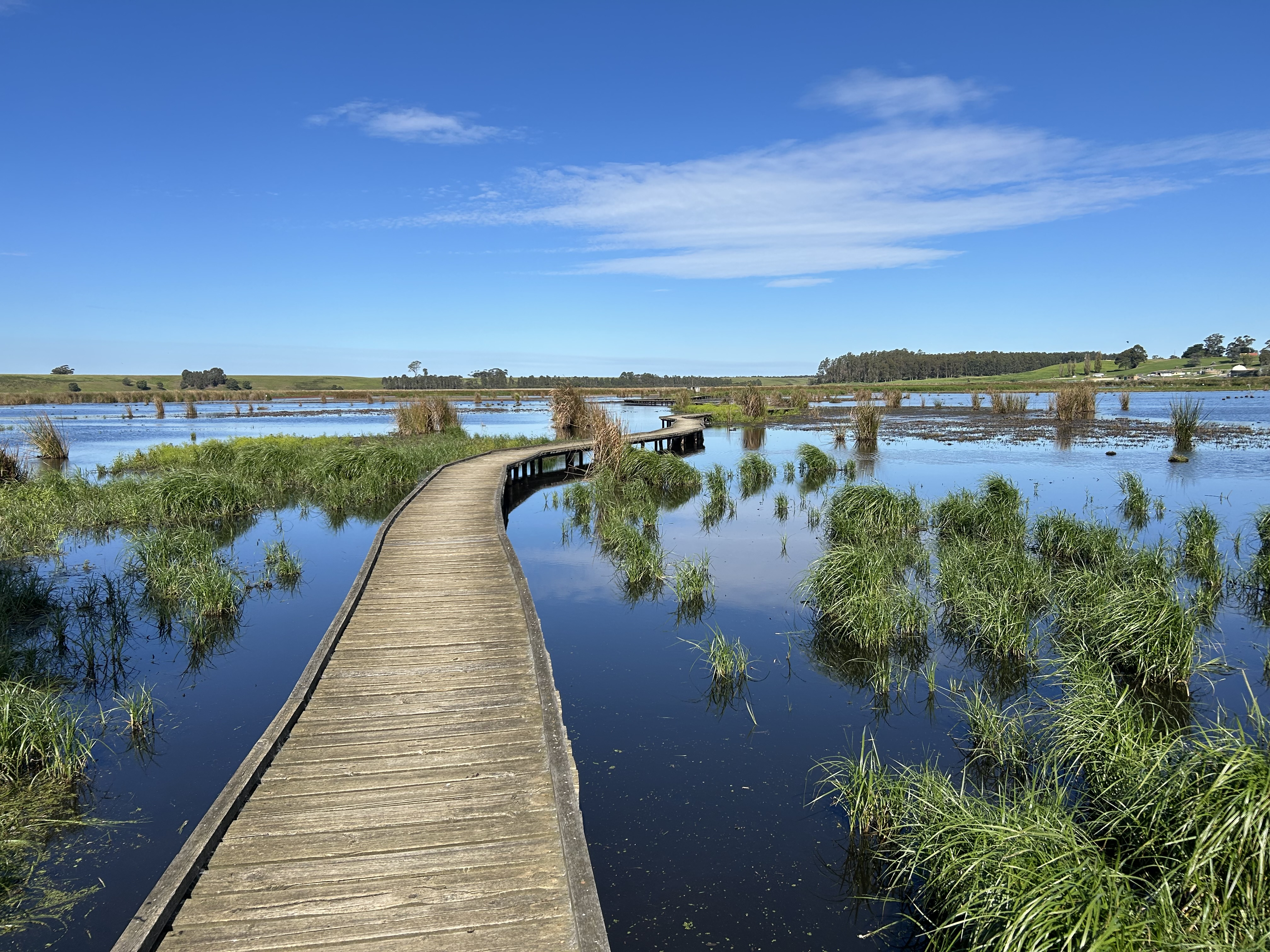
Boardwalk at Macleod Morass

Macleod Morass and Jones Bay Wildlife Reserves cover an area of 557 hectares and 123 hectares, respectively. The Reserves lie immediately south of Bairnsdale at the head of Lake King and on either side of the Mitchell River. According to tradition, the Tatungoloong clan of the Gunai/Kurnai peoples were the custodians of land and waters and used the aquatic and terrestrial habitats of the area as sources of food and the surrounding open forest for shelter.

Macleod Morass formed with and was eventually isolated from Lake King and Jones Bay with the development of the Mitchell River silt jetties. The marginal bluff marks the former shoreline position of Lake King and the relict gravel beaches and spits were formed by wave action.

The area contains geological features and sites of state geological and geomorphological significance. The extensive "backswamp" forming Macleod Morass, the escarpment ("marginal bluff") along its western boundary, and relict gravel beaches and spits (e.g. Brownlow's Point) are important features providing evidence of once higher sea levels in Bass Strait.

Macleod Morass was originally classified as a "deep freshwater marsh" but currently only approximately 30% of the morass is still representative of the original classification. Water inflows to the morass are dominated by catchment run-off from Cobblers Creek and several smaller intermittent streams, urban stormwater from McGees Gully, and direct rainfall. Major floods in the Mitchell River result in complete inundation of Macleod Morass and serve to flush the entire wetland system.

Since 1939, wastewater that has been treated to varying levels has been discharged to Macleod Morass, resulting in elevated nutrient levels, reductions in water quality and changes in the distribution and abundance of vegetation. Macleod Morass Wildlife Reserve was first reserved on 16 August 1961 under the Land Act 1958 (Vic.). Jones Bay Wildlife Reserve was first reserved on 7 April 1961 for the Preservation of Wildlife under the Land Act. Macleod Morass and Jones Bay Wildlife Reserves occur within the Gippsland Lakes Ramsar Site, listed under the Ramsar Convention.

The reserves contain a range of threatened vegetation types that provide habitat for a diverse array of wildlife including 23 threatened fauna species. Over 100 bird species, including 53 waterbird species, have been recorded within the vicinity. Eight migratory bird species found in the reserves are listed under the international Japan–Australia Migratory Bird Agreement 1974, China–Australia Migratory Bird Agreement 1987 and the Convention on the Conservation of Migratory Species of Wild Animals.

Macleod Morass is an important breeding site for Australian white ibis (Threskiornis moluccus), straw-necked ibis (Threskiornis spinicollis) and black-winged stilt (Himantopus himantopus). Management strategies are in place to protect known sites of significant fauna and colonial breeding waterbirds from unnecessary disturbance, particularly the white-bellied sea eagle (Haliaeetus leucogaster), green and golden bell frog, warty bell frog, black-winged stilt, Australian white ibis and the straw-necked ibis.

A diverse range of 141 fauna species has been identified near the reserves, including 23 fauna species listed as threatened in Victoria and three nationally vulnerable.

== Demographics ==
At the 2021 census, there were 15,684 people in Bairnsdale.

- Aboriginal and Torres Strait Islander people made up 4.8% of the population.
- 81.2% of people were born in Australia. The most common other countries of birth were England 2.8%, Philippines 1.0%, New Zealand 0.9%, India 0.6%, and Germany 0.5%.
- 87.5% of people only spoke English at home. Other languages spoken at home included Italian at 0.5%.
- The most common responses for religion were No religion 46.5%, Catholic 16.0% and Anglican 13.1%.

== Climate ==
Bairnsdale experiences a temperate climate with mild to warm summers and cool, damp winters. The highest recorded temperature in the town was 46.2 °C (115.2 °F) on 7 February 2009, during the early 2009 Australian summer heatwave. The lowest, −5.4 °C (22.3 °F), was recorded on 2 July 2017.

Winter days are slightly warmer than Melbourne's due to a minor foehn effect. The town features 59.6 clear days annually, also higher than Melbourne's 48.6 days.

Climate data for Bairnsdale (Bairnsdale Airport 1942–present)
| Month | Jan | Feb | Mar | Apr | May | Jun | Jul | Aug | Sep | Oct | Nov | Dec | Year |
|---|---|---|---|---|---|---|---|---|---|---|---|---|---|
| Record high °C (°F) | 45.8 (114.4) | 46.2 (115.2) | 40.8 (105.4) | 37.5 (99.5) | 29.4 (84.9) | 25.0 (77.0) | 22.7 (72.9) | 27.0 (80.6) | 35.4 (95.7) | 35.8 (96.4) | 43.5 (110.3) | 43.6 (110.5) | 46.2 (115.2) |
| Mean daily maximum °C (°F) | 25.9 (78.6) | 25.5 (77.9) | 24.0 (75.2) | 20.7 (69.3) | 17.6 (63.7) | 15.0 (59.0) | 14.7 (58.5) | 15.8 (60.4) | 17.7 (63.9) | 20.0 (68.0) | 21.9 (71.4) | 23.8 (74.8) | 20.2 (68.4) |
| Mean daily minimum °C (°F) | 13.2 (55.8) | 13.0 (55.4) | 11.4 (52.5) | 8.8 (47.8) | 6.7 (44.1) | 4.7 (40.5) | 4.0 (39.2) | 4.6 (40.3) | 5.9 (42.6) | 7.6 (45.7) | 9.8 (49.6) | 11.4 (52.5) | 8.4 (47.1) |
| Record low °C (°F) | 4.2 (39.6) | 3.5 (38.3) | 2.0 (35.6) | 0.5 (32.9) | −3.0 (26.6) | −3.2 (26.2) | −5.4 (22.3) | −4.5 (23.9) | −2.2 (28.0) | −1.0 (30.2) | 1.6 (34.9) | 2.5 (36.5) | −5.4 (22.3) |
| Average rainfall mm (inches) | 50.8 (2.00) | 45.3 (1.78) | 47.6 (1.87) | 56.7 (2.23) | 43.6 (1.72) | 63.2 (2.49) | 46.4 (1.83) | 37.2 (1.46) | 50.4 (1.98) | 61.9 (2.44) | 79.3 (3.12) | 61.8 (2.43) | 644.2 (25.35) |
| Average rainy days (≥ 0.2mm) | 8.9 | 8.3 | 9.3 | 11.1 | 13.2 | 14.0 | 13.8 | 13.4 | 13.4 | 13.3 | 11.8 | 11.0 | 141.5 |
Source: Bureau of Meteorology

== Landmarks ==
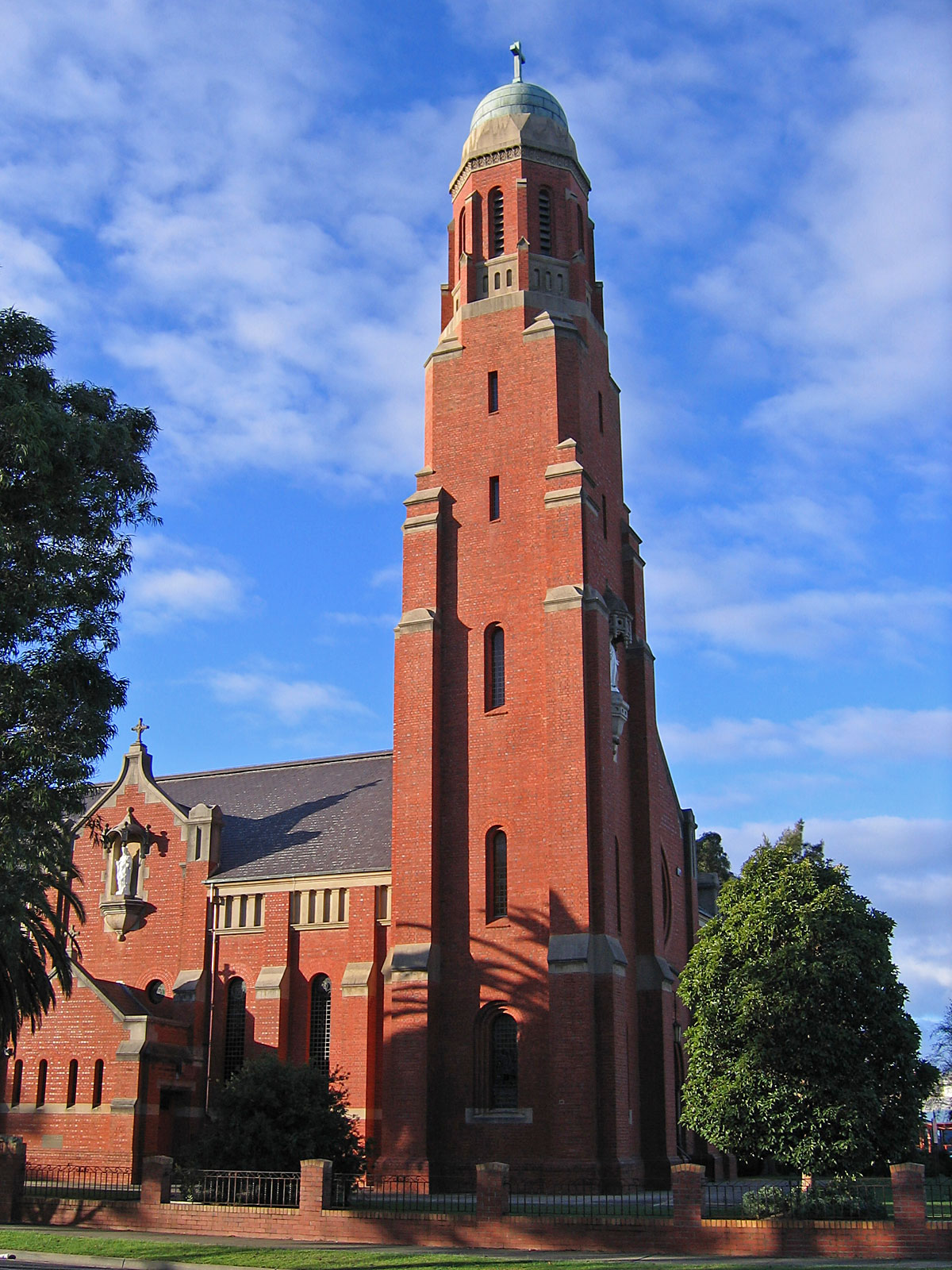
St Marys Church Bairnsdale is listed on the Victorian Heritage Database and the National Trust Register. On 19 October 2013 the church celebrated its 100th anniversary

Some of the earlier buildings in the town are perhaps a memorial to William J. Yates, who was a prominent architect, builder and monumental mason. He built the school, the old Shire Hall (1860), the Wesleyan Church and parsonage (1876), St. John's Church, the old Bairnsdale Hospital (corner of McKean and Ross Streets) and the Mechanic's Hall.

=== Roman Catholic Church ===
One of the most notable landmarks of Bairnsdale is the St Mary's Roman Catholic Church in Main Street known for its distinctively tall tower. Construction of St Mary's Church was commenced in 1913, replacing an earlier brick church which had been built thirty years earlier in 1883. Murals rivaling those of many European churches cover the walls and ceiling of St Mary's in Bairnsdale depicting saints, the trinity and scenes of hell, purgatory, heaven and the crucifixion.

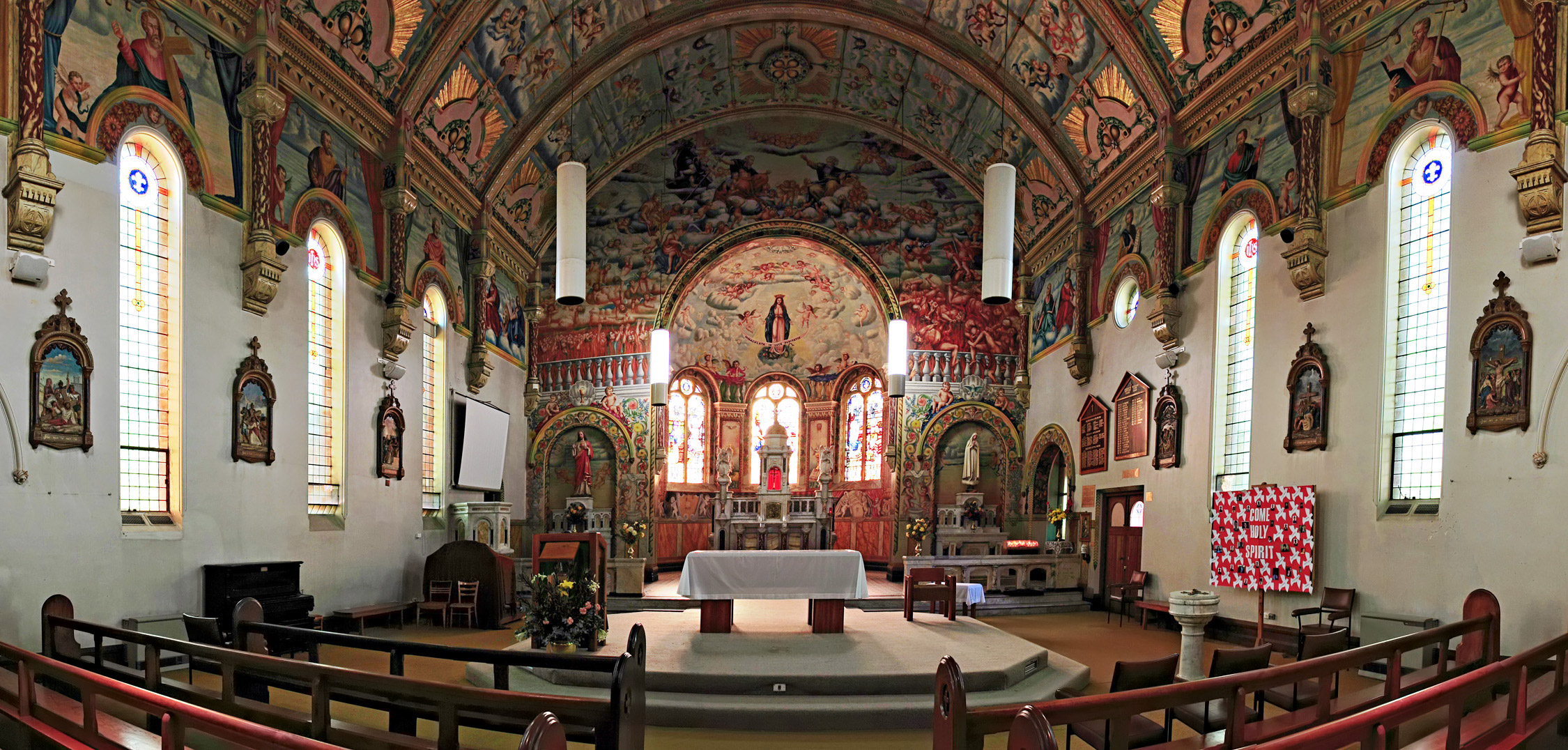
St Marys Bairnsdale may look quite ordinary on the outside but its real glory lies within. Amazing murals rivaling those of European churches are on offer for all to see.

Every year the church receives up to 80,000 visitors from all over Australia and the world. The murals were painted by out of work Italian artist Francesco Floreani during the Great Depression and remains a fascination to this day.

St Mary's Roman Catholic Church was well established when a new church building was opened on 29 April 1883. Patrick O'Donohue was priest from 1883 to 1888. Early in the 1880s a school was opened and developed quickly so that extensions to the building were added in 1888. There were about 120 pupils in 1890. Father Cremin oversaw the congregation from 1909 and in this period plans were drawn up to erect a magnificent brick church at an estimated £10,000. The architects were A. A. Fritsch and Harry French. Work started in August 1913 with the a stone being laid by Bishop Phelan of Sale on 19 October. The new church with its tower, described by a witness as, "a free treatment of Romanesque style, built of brick with a slate roof".

Bairnsdale experienced growth in church numbers in the 1880s, many of them frequently recording packed congregations, particularly on special occasions. St Johns Church of England often had congregations of over 200 at the morning and evening services. The congregations of that church were headed by E. W. S. Hartmann, who later died crossing the flooded Mitchell River. He was succeeded by W. G. Hindley, under whom a new brick church was built (still on the corner of Francis and Service Streets) and opened by Bishop Moorhouse on 24 June 1884.

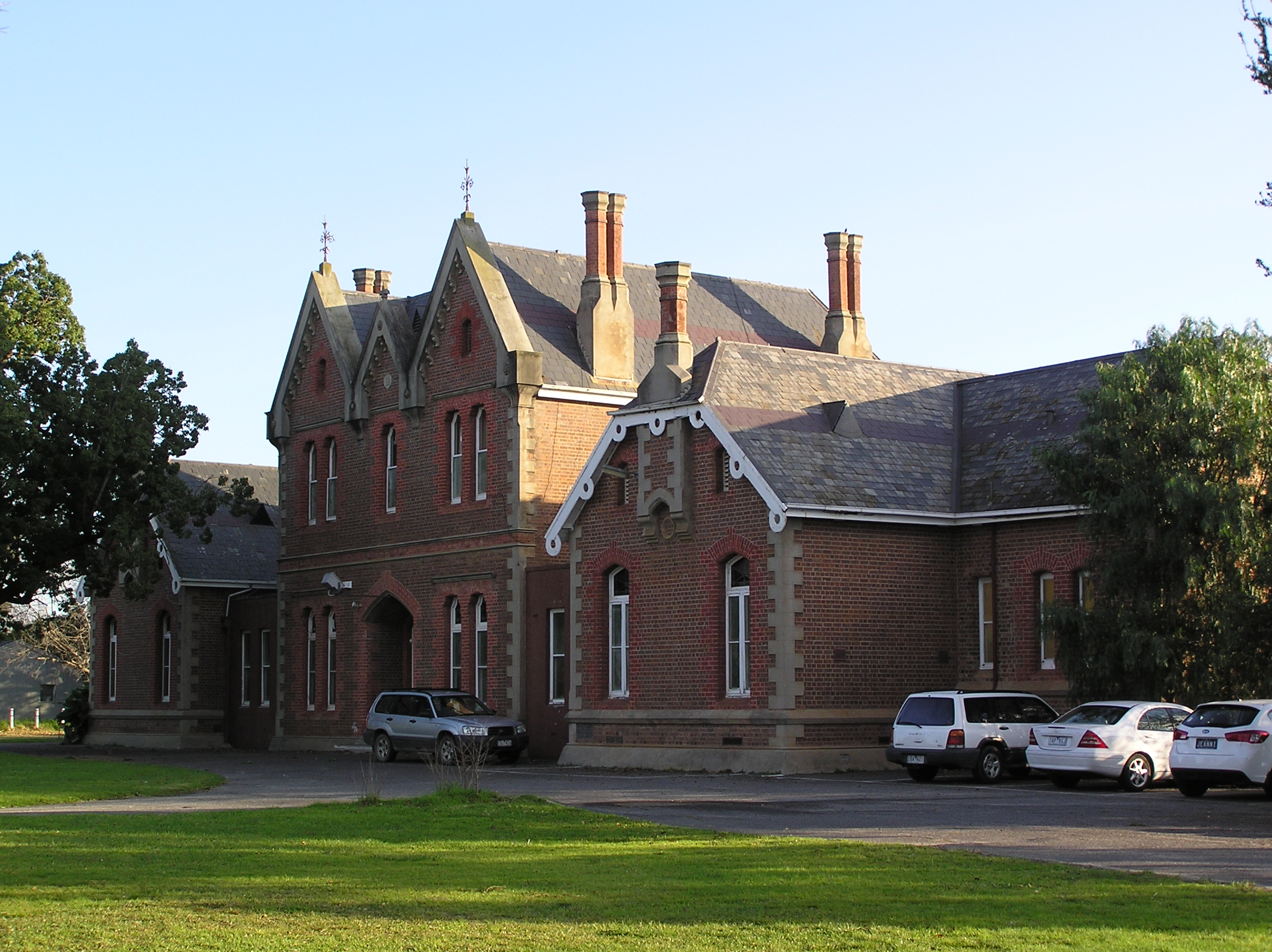
The former Bairnsdale Hospital buildings designed by Harry Gibbs, the two-storey central block, the single-storey pavilions on each side and the Contagious Diseases Ward to the south, are architecturally significant as an outstanding and largely intact example of nineteenth century hospital design.

=== Gardens ===
Bairnsdale's centre gardens stretch from the Mitchell River to the western edge of town, a distance of about 4 kilometres (2 mi). The main garden section runs for over 500 metres (550 yd) through the central commercial district and features beds of flowering annuals and perennials, numerous mature deciduous and evergreen trees, war memorials and a restored historic band rotunda. The rotunda was constructed in 1910 and restored to its present condition in 1993.

In 1943 the erection of a monument at the eastern end of the gardens to the district centenary led to that section being called the Centenary Garden. The Country Women's Association younger set took over the beautification of the Centenary Garden in 1947 and planted a tree there in May of that year to commemorate the 21st birthday of Princess Elizabeth. Extensive tree planting with Australian native trees was carried out in the post-war years, providing a colourful display, particularly in spring and early summer.

From 1964 under the care of the town's head gardeners, E. A. Cottrell and C. T. Harrison, the gardens had been extended westward with the planting of hardy trees, in particular desert ash and flowering gum. By 1959 the highway had been extended to the foot of the hospital hill, and tree planting and lawns had provided two kilometres of gardens on the centre reserves. Garden beds were extended westward to the West End Store in 1975 with the help of people employed under the Whitlam government Regional Employment Development Scheme for the unemployed. In 1969 a wishing well that was carved by Bruce Duffy of the Technical School and financed by Rotary was erected in the Centre Gardens adjacent to the Coles supermarket. In 1984 a plaque was added to commemorate Victoria's 150th anniversary.

To commemorate those locals who did not return from the Boer War in 1899, a monument was unveiled in the Main Street Gardens on 12 June 1903 in the presence of Lord and Lady Forrest, a number of returned men, school cadets and a large crowd of citizens.

=== Cemetery ===
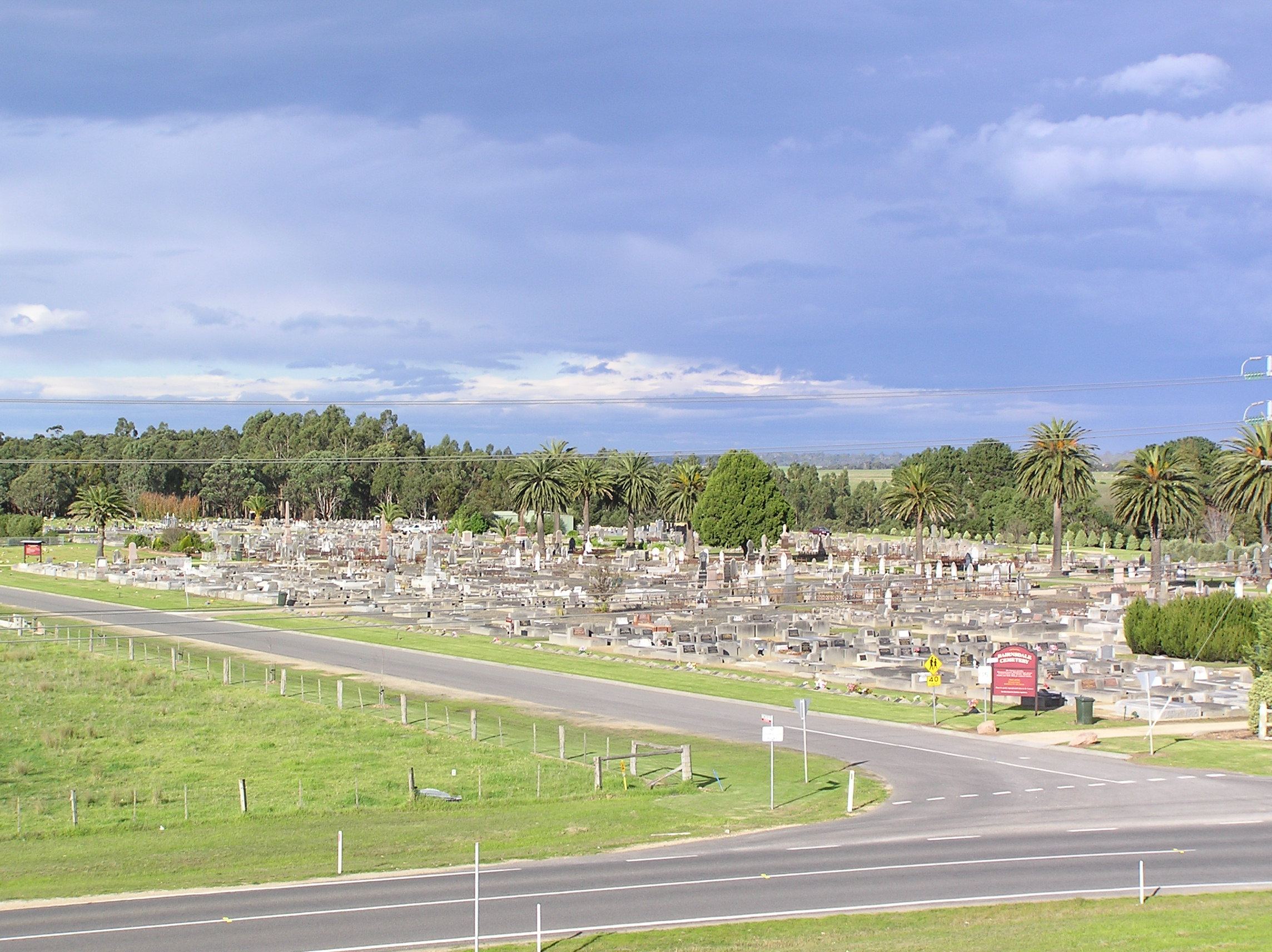
Entrance to the Bairnsdale Cemetery on the corner of Forge Creek Road

The Bairnsdale cemetery is now located off Forge Creek road opposite the race course. Its original location was situated at punt flat, now the site of the Mitchell Gardens Holiday Park beside the river. A plaque in acknowledgement of the site is located at the south-east corner of the caravan park. As a result of the major flooding in 1870 the site experienced erosion and reports were made that remains were washed downstream. Peter Moroney, Shire Secretary at the time, instructed William Jefferson to retrieve the remains and they were re-interred at the present cemetery.

As far back as the 1920s the cemetery was frequently criticised for its untidy appearance. It was proposed around this time that the cemetery be removed from the overseer of the council and transferred to the care of the different denominations. This was not adopted. In 1990 control of the cemetery was transferred to a community based trust. The lawn section of the cemetery was commenced in 1969. Initially, wooden pegs were used to indicate grave numbers; later, cloverleaf-shaped cast-iron pegs were used. In 1946 a memorial garden was established for Bairnsdale's war dead. The Imperial War Graves Commission took over this section in 1946 and the area was attractively laid out with a fine gate and cypress hedge, well kept lawns and white headstones, with a central memorial Cross of Sacrifice to the memory of the Royal Australian Air Force personnel who died in the Bairnsdale district during the war. Sir Dallas Brooks unveiled the Cross on a visit to the town on 7 September 1950. The lawn section was planned in 1964 and completed in 1970.

Frederick Jones was the earliest of the squatters in the Bairnsdale Shire. Jones had previously been a school teacher in Castlereagh Street, Sydney. In the early 1840s Jones joined one of the early pastoralists in the Gippsland area, William Odell Raymond, at Omeo—he was travelling south from the Wellington area where he owned land on the Macquarie River across the border in New South Wales. They arrived at the Mitchell River crossing on 20 June 1842. Once in the region Jones decided to take up the area of Lucknow. He named it such, in contrast to the other settlers Frederick Taylor and John M. Loughnan who had taken up Lindenow—the reason being that Jones had left Sydney a poor man and he felt auspicious about his new life and hence felt his luck was on the ascendancy.

In 1848 John Archer, a retired sea-captain, was appointed manager of Lucknow Station. Jones travelled back to New South Wales to visit his run on the Murrumbidgee River. Archer had been a master on Letitia, which operated between Sydney and Hobart, and later traded cattle between Port Albert and Hobart. In 1845 Archer married a young girl named Eliza and brought her to Gippsland, settling at Lucknow in 1847. Eliza died in childbirth and her grave's headstone can still be seen by the roadside on Crooke Street, East Bairnsdale.

The monument is not at the original burial position, several house blocks to the west; it has been moved down the street as houses have been built. It is thought that this headstone is the only remaining evidence that there was a cemetery in this general area in the 1800s. The inscription on the headstone reads "Sown in weakness, to be raised in power".

== Infrastructure ==
=== Education ===
Educational facilities in Bairnsdale include two high schools. The government funded Bairnsdale Secondary College, with approximately 1,600 students, was formed in 1993 as a merger of two separate high schools: the Bairnsdale Technical School (earlier known as the Bairnsdale School of Mines and Industries) and Bairnsdale High School. Nagle College, which has about 1,000 students, was founded in 1958 by the Presentation Sisters and holds to a Catholic tradition. It later adopted the Salesian traditions of St John Bosco, with the arrival of the Salesian Society to Bairnsdale in 1990. The city also has a number of primary schools including the well established and historical Bairnsdale Primary School, Bairnsdale West Primary School, and East Gippsland Specialist School, which accommodates students from prep to year 12. Bairnsdale also has Lucknow Primary School located in Eastwood. Lucknow Primary School has a kindergarten extension for children aged 3 to 5. As well there are many kindergartens including Bairnsdale Childcare and Kinder, and Eastwood Early Learning Centre, but limited tertiary education facilities mainly consisting of the East Gippsland Institute of TAFE and Federation Training.

=== Transport ===
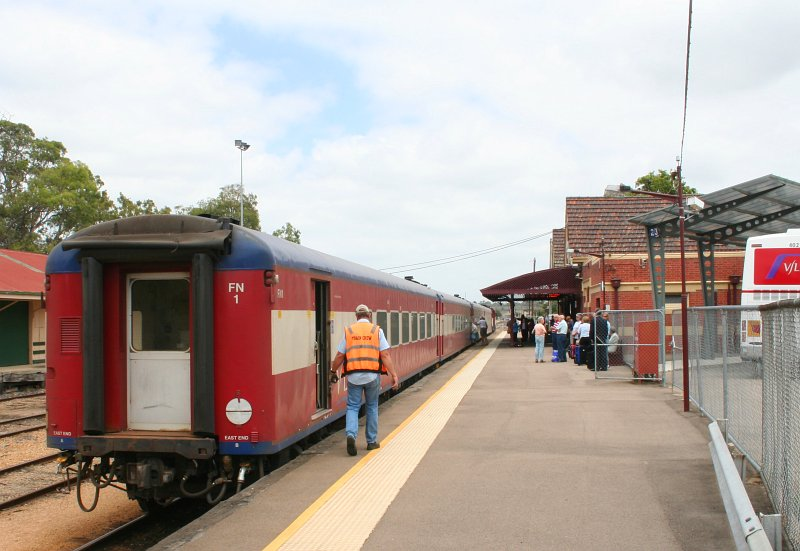
Bairnsdale railway station

Bairnsdale established a reputation as a marketing and trading centre for the large rural area of East Gippsland and this has been helped by the development of excellent road systems, a good railway service and to some extent steamer and air services. The 1880s were seen as the "Golden Age" for steamer traffic on the rivers, and Bairnsdale was seen as one of the major colonial ports. The brick Bairnsdale railway station opened in 1890, with other platforms and railway infrastructure being completed at the same time. The contractor R. Kreokel won the contract for the work to be carried out for the amount of £2,322.

Shipping services from Bairnsdale to metropolitan areas linked with the railway so local primary producers could send their goods off to the markets in the major centre of Melbourne. As a consequence of the more frequent use of rail and the advent of refrigerated carts in 1890 that allowed dairy farmers and fishermen to appropriately transport their produce, the last coach service between Sale and Bairnsdale ran in 1889. In World War II rail services were reduced with only three trains per week direct to Bairnsdale but services were restored in 1948. In 1952 diesel trains were first used on the line and the daily train from Melbourne to Bairnsdale was named The Gippslander. Victorian Railways established the Bairnsdale station as a regional freight centre in 1977.

The contemporary rail transport system is still facilitated by the major railway station in Bairnsdale railway station which is the terminus of the Bairnsdale railway line. V/Line provides rail services. Performance figures for 2014 for services to Bairnsdale (long-distance service) were 98.9% and 86.7% for reliability and punctuality, respectively. In comparison with figures from May to December 2013, the average reliability and punctuality are both down 0.5%.

Bairnsdale Cabs provides a local taxi service around the city. Bus service is facilitated by Gillicks Bus Lines, Dysons (V/Line contractor) and Goodalls Bus Lines as well as a number of others in Bairnsdale and surrounding areas.

One of the major recreational transport infrastructure systems in the city is the East Gippsland Rail Trail, which begins in at the entrance to East Bairnsdale adjacent to Howitt Park. The track consists of asphalt that extends to Nicholson where it then becomes a track made from hard base gravel that forms a solid surface. Almost 100 kilometres (62 miles) in length, the multi-use trail permits running, walking, cycling and horse-riding as it follows the alignment of the former railway line to Orbost. The Bairnsdale section of the track is relatively straight, long and flat and takes users over two small bridges and crosses Phillips Lane and Morrisson Road before it intersects with the Princes Highway, which was given that name in 1920 when the Country Roads Board assumed control of the whole length of highway between Melbourne and Eden.

==== Aerodrome ====
Bairnsdale Airport is situated on a land area of 280 hectares owned wholly by East Gippsland Shire Council. It was established as part of the war effort in the 1940s. In this time, the aerodrome on Bengworden Road was used as an extension to the nearby RAAF Base East Sale and was home to 3,000 men. The main purpose of the facility was for reconnaissance missions and navigational training over Bass Strait and the Tasman Sea.

In 1929 a suitable site for the aerodrome was required, with the racecourse suggested but deemed unsuitable. In 1935 submissions were made to the Civil Aviation Department to select a site. In mid-1939 the boundaries of the aerodrome were established and buildings were erected. By 1947 the buildings were sold, dismantled and transported to the Woomera project in South Australia.

The Commonwealth Government gave high priority to developing new coastal airbases at Mallacoota and Bairnsdale to assist in protecting shipping lanes in Bass Strait. The base became fully operational in May 1942 with the arrival of the No. 7 Squadron operating Hudson Aircraft on shipping convoy escort and anti-submarine patrols. At the same time the new Bristol Beaufort bombers were moved to Bairnsdale in June 1942. The No. 1 operation Training Unit trained 631 pupils, flew 38,875 hours and had aircraft in the air around the clock.

There were 53 crashes with aircraft being lost at sea and 71 airmen killed and others injured. In total there were 1,997 officers and airmen and 117 WAAAF members with an additional 285 trainees. Adding to this were 12 Hudson crews and ground staff dispatched during December 1942 to assist in New Guinea by dropping supplies to ground troops in the Buna area. Two Hudsons were lost with four men killed in action and a further four being seriously injured. Before the end of the war 87 people died at Bairnsdale owing to crashes or missing aircraft.

In total there were 100 aircraft based at Bairnsdale. The aircraft included 50 Beauforts, 12 Lockheed Hudsons, 25 Airspeed Oxfords, 12 Fairey Battles and one Tiger Moth. In March 1950 Australian National Airlines launched a regular service from Bairnsdale to Melbourne with a Douglas DC-3, a 24-passenger plane. A succession of companies including Ansett-ANA, Commuter Airlines, Jetair Services and Business Jets tried to establish a similar service but without any long-term success. In 1966 and 1967 helicopters were used to transport pipeline-laying-barge and offshore oil platform workers, mainly employees of the American-owned McDermott's, into Bass Strait. Since then the West Sale Airport has been used extensively for this purpose. Currently the aerodrome's facilities support a number of commercial aviation enterprises, including aerial firefighting, corporate charter, aircraft support services such as fleet maintenance, and medical services such as air ambulance and courier services.

=== Water supply ===
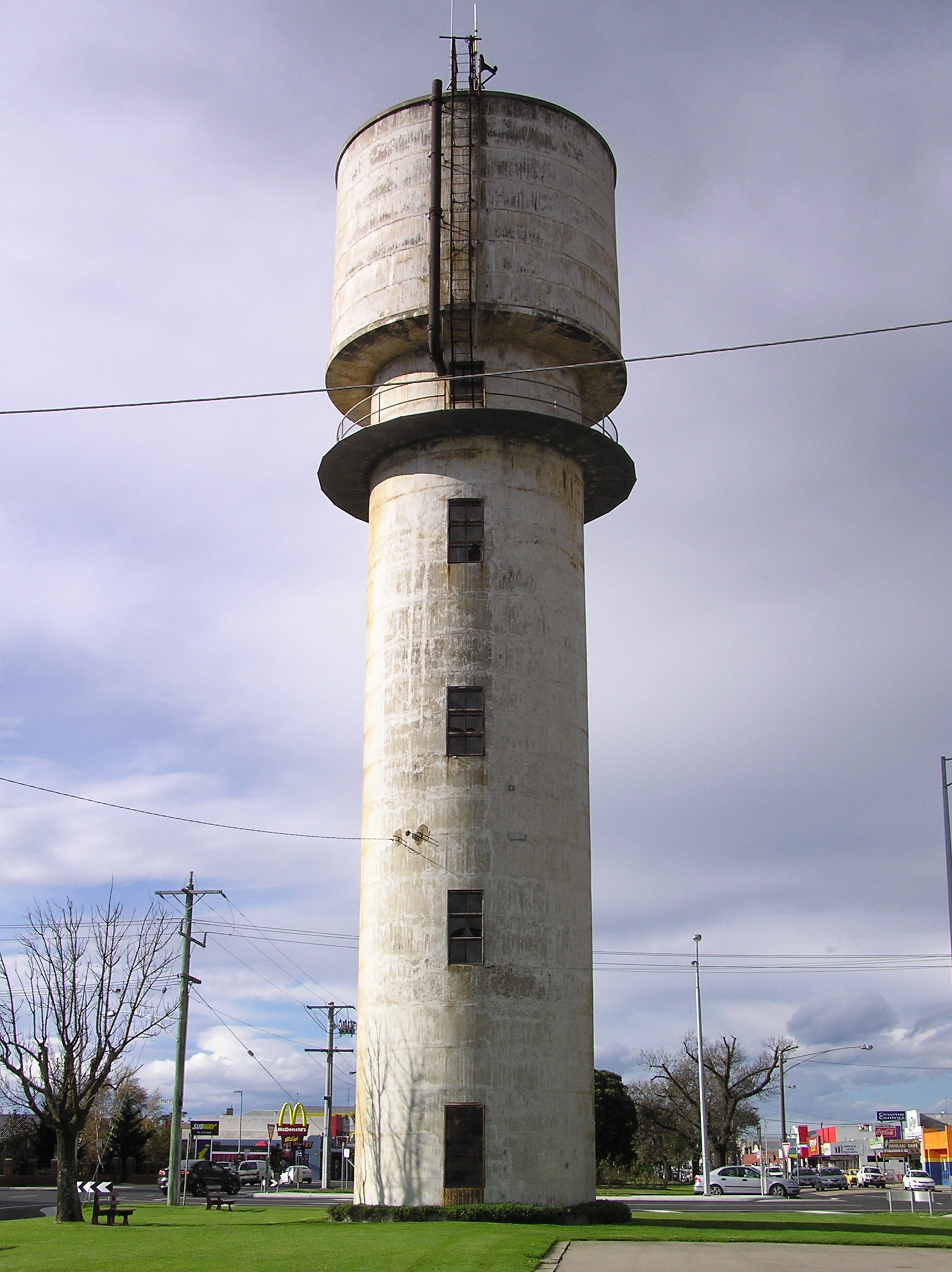
Bairnsdale's Water Tower has been out of commission since the late 1980s and now serves as an icon of the Bairnsdale skyline

Plans were put forward in 1884 for the town's water supply and tanks were erected in Main Street from which residents could draw water. Later, John H. Grainger, who designed the new Princes Bridge in Melbourne, delivered plans to build a reservoir west of the township and for this to be connected to a pumping-plant and an elevated tank in the town itself. Contracts totaling £6,132 were made for Potter and Roberts to build the reservoir. The pipes were laid soon after, with John Jefferson appointed the engineer of the works. By 1890 reticulation of the town was ready to take place.

An upgrade to the station in 1906 included installation of a new, larger cylindrical, concrete tank with a capacity of 350,000 imperial gallons (1.6 ML), designed by (Sir) John Monash's Reinforced Concrete and Monier Pipe Construction Company. At the time this tank was a pioneering example in the state of reinforced concrete construction for water tank construction. In 1935 a dosing shed was added to the tank for chemical treatment of the water supply.

A new cylindrical, concrete pump house was also added in 1906, which initially housed a steam-driven pump but from 1926 housed a pair of newly invented electrically powered X-pumps.

In order to supply a more consistent water pressure a reinforced concrete water tower was also built in Main Street in 1926–27. Measuring 100 ft (30 m) high with a capacity of 80,000 imperial gallons (360 kL), the structure was constructed by civil engineer Svend Haunstrup.

In 1935 another pump house with five electric booster pumps was built on the upper level. A workshop was added in the 1950s. The pumping station continued to operate until the 1980s, when the new Woodglen storage basin at Glenaladale was complete. Today the tower sits as a well-recognised icon of the Bairnsdale skyline. In 1955, costing £32,000, works commenced on new mains and pumping plants to extend reticulation to sections of West Bairnsdale, and in 1958 work began on reconditioning the existing mains and pipes using cement lining.

With the increasing demand for water during the 1960s the Water Trust went ahead with plans to install a clarification plant and to set up a 90-megalitre basin at Wy Yung that was to be linked with the already existing system. Plans were also slated for an additional storage basin to be built on the Mitchell River at Glenaladale. The basin at Wy Yung was opened on 8 November 1972. In 1983 the government sought to reduce the number of local water trusts and sewerage authorities. The Mitchell Water Board replaced the Bairnsdale Water and Sewerage Trusts, the Paynesville Water Trust, the Lindenow Water Trust and the Bairnsdale Shire Sewerage Trust.

To ensure long-term drinking water supplies, a major additional drinking water storage and water treatment plant located northwest of Bairnsdale at Woodglen entered service in mid-2010, providing a significant boost to long-term water security for the region. This plant is capable of processing up to 20 megalitres of water a day and utilises a dissolved air flotation/filtration process water treatment process. At 600 metres long, 300 metres wide and ten metres deep, the facility is designed to hold 715 megalitres of water, equivalent to 715 Olympic-size swimming pools. This facility supplements Woodglen's original 850-megalitre storage. Twenty-four thousand people are reliant on the Mitchell River water supply system, from Lindenow through to Nowa Nowa, including the communities of Bairnsdale, Paynesville and Lakes Entrance.

== Media ==
=== Newspapers ===
Bairnsdale's local newspapers are the Bairnsdale Advertiser for sale on Mondays and Fridays and East Gippsland News delivered free on Wednesday every week. Both publications along with several others are owned and published by East Gippsland Newspapers. A unique feature of the Bairnsdale Advertiser is that it has continued in the same family since the 1880s. In the ten years to 1986 the paper won the John and James Cook award for non-daily Victorian newspapers. The printer has in past years also printed several books for local writers.

=== Television ===
Television was introduced to Bairnsdale in 1956 when John Porter erected the first antenna in the town. Later, the area was the first in Australia to receive its own regional television station, GLV-10 Gippsland (now Network 10), when it launched on 9 December 1961.

Programs from the three main commercial television networks (Seven, Nine and 10) are all re-broadcast into Bairnsdale by their regional stations – Seven (formerly Prime7) (AMV), WIN (VTV) and 10 (GLV). All broadcast from the Latrobe Valley transmitter at Mount Tassie as well as local relay transmitters located at Mount Taylor approximately 12–13 km NNW from Bairnsdale. All the commercial stations are based in Traralgon and have local commercials placed on their broadcasts.

Local news is available on all three commercial networks:

- WIN broadcasts a half-hour WIN News bulletin each weeknight at 5:30pm, produced from studios in Wollongong.
- Network 10 and the Seven Network broadcast short local news and weather updates throughout the day, produced and broadcast from Seven's Canberra studios and 10's Tasmanian studios.

Nine previously produced a local news bulletin branded Nine News Gippsland and later Nine News Local for a brief period between 2017 and 2021 that aired on the Southern Cross Austereo primary channel when it was previously affiliated with Nine.

Both national public broadcasters, ABC (ABC TV) and SBS (SBS TV) are broadcast into Bairnsdale as well, via Mount Tassie and Mount Taylor.

Additional digital multi-channels broadcast by all the networks in addition to the ones listed above are available on the digital service called Freeview to viewers in Bairnsdale and the Gippsland/Latrobe Valley region. These channels include HD simulcasts of the primary channel (available on channels 20, 30, 50, 60 and 80). As well as ABC Family, ABC Entertains, ABC News, SBS2, SBS World Movies, 10 Drama, 10 Comedy, Nickelodeon, 7two, 7mate, 9Gem, 9Go!, 9Life and News24 Regional.

Subscription television service Foxtel (previously Austar until 2014) is available via satellite.

=== Radio ===
The local community radio station, R.E.G. FM broadcasts on 105.5 MHz and 90.7 MHz and operates from studio's in Bairnsdale and Lakes Entrance. R.E.G. FM presenters are local volunteers. The station offers easy listening music and classic hits from the 1950s to the present.

Local commercial radio services TRFM (99.9 MHz) and Gold 1242 (98.3 MHz) are operated by Ace Radio and broadcast to Bairnsdale and most listeners in the Gippsland area as far east as the town of Orbost. The Gold 1242 AM 1242 kHz transmitter is located in Myrtlebank between Maffra and Sale but is also rebroadcast on 98.3 MHz from Mount Taylor.

Local ABC station, ABC Gippsland broadcasts into Bairnsdale on 828 kHz AM from Longford, near Sale and on 100.7 MHz from the distant Latrobe Valley transmitter at Mount Tassie. National ABC stations Triple J (96.7 MHz) and ABC Classic (101.5 MHz) are also broadcast from Mount Tassie. ABC Radio National (106.3 MHz) and ABC News Radio (107.9 MHz) are rebroadcast locally from Mount Taylor.

== Sport ==
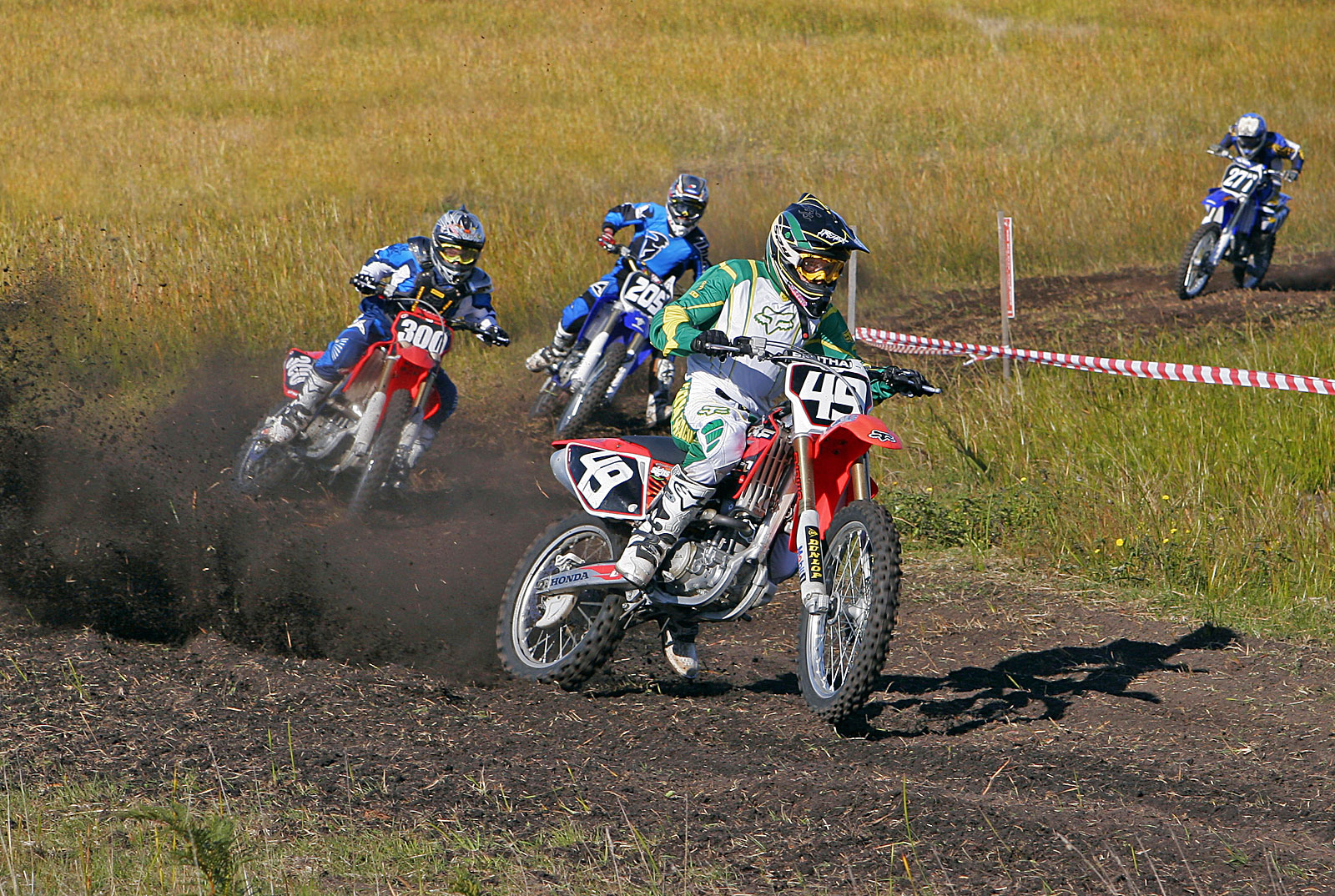
Motocross racing in Bairnsdale

=== Australian rules football ===
The town has three Australian rules football clubs, with Bairnsdale Football Club (the Redlegs) competing in the Gippsland Football League and Lucknow and Wy Yung competing in the local East Gippsland Football League. Football developed into proper competitions by the 1890s with the first football ground being set up in Lucknow; however, the game was traditionally played in front of the Main Hotel in Bairnsdale with spectators climbing the verandahs, rooftops and balconies for a view of the game. In May 1885 a uniform consisting of a blue-and-white jersey, blue knickerbockers, red stockings and cap and a red sash was adopted, giving birth to the name the "Red-legs" for the team.

The first match played in team uniform was against Essendon. Matches between Bairnsdale, Sale and Maffra were also played around 1888. Bairnsdale won the Premiership against Sale in 1893, 1895, 1896 and 1899. Premierships were also won in 1902, 1903, 1908, 1912 and 1913 with Doug Potter as captain. There were also other teams in Bairnsdale consisting of the Fire Brigade, Bruthen, Sarsfield, Cunningham and other nearby districts.

=== Cricket ===
Cricket teams were set up in the 1890s with a women's cricket team developed in 1908. The depression years hindered the progress of inter-town matches being developed over any length of time. Several matches were played between metropolitan teams and with the establishment of better rail services and a universal half-holiday on Saturdays, district cricket tended to improve. In 1892 Lord Sheffield's visiting English cricket team played a Gippsland team at Bairnsdale on the Bairnsdale College grounds.

=== Soccer ===
Soccer is represented by East Gippsland United Football Club who play in the Latrobe Valley Soccer League. The Victorian regional leagues are the eighth level of soccer in Victoria, and the ninth nationally. The club's home ground is Howitt Park in East Bairnsdale.

The other club, Bairnsdale Soccer Club focuses on Futsal, a modified form of the game.

=== Other sports ===
Bairnsdale has a horse racing club, the Bairnsdale Racing Club, which schedules around eight race meetings a year including the Bairnsdale Cup meeting usually held on the first Sunday in January. The town has two field hockey clubs in the East Gippsland Hockey Association. The Bairnsdale Hockey Club is based at the WORLD fields, while the Nagle Hockey Club is based at Nagle College, just out of town to the west. Golfers play at the Bairnsdale Golf Club on Paynesville Road, Eagle Point or at the course of the Goose Gully Golf Greens on Balfours Road.

With its close proximity to the Gippsland Lakes and Ninety Mile Beach, along with easy access to the Mitchell, Nicholson and Tambo rivers, Bairnsdale proves to be a popular destination for recreational anglers and good catches are reported regularly. Bait and tackle supplies, along with the required angling licenses are readily available in Bairnsdale. Bairnsdale is also home to the Bairnsdale Aquatic and Recreation Centre (BARC), which is the largest indoor sports complex in country Victoria and contains two swimming pools, three basketball courts, several gym rooms and the Forge theatre. The Riviera triathlon club, based in Bairnsdale, run events all year round including the popular mini triathlons on Wednesday nights at the BARC between October and March.

Bairnsdale Cycling Club run road races most weekends throughout the year taking in the scenic terrain around the Gippsland Lakes and foothills of the Great Dividing Range, the club is home to talent such as Daniel McConnell, a two-time Olympian and mountain-bike world-cup winner. The Gippsland Mountain bike club holds many events around the area. Bairnsdale is an excellent mountain biking destination with Mt Taylor downhill and cross-country trails only 10 minutes' drive north, Colqhoun park 15 minutes east and Mt Nowa Nowa only a 35-minute drive.

== Commercial ==
According to the 2011 Census, of the employed people in Bairnsdale (urban centres and localities), 6.0% worked in school education. Other major industries of employment included residential care services 5.4%, bakery product manufacturing 4.3%, cafés, restaurants and takeaway food services 4.0% and supermarket and grocery stores 2.5%. Outside of the retail, education, health and welfare sectors there are a limited number of agricultural jobs. The technology and communications sector does not play a major role in the area.

Goodman's cannery operated for many years until it closed in the last 1920s. Associated with the cannery was the case-making works operated under Percy Dahlsen, W. P. Heath and A. Palmer in 1921, operating from Dalmahoy Street in Bairnsdale and employing about 25 men. The plant consisted of four saws driven by a 30 KW motor and produced around 1,500 cases per day. Goodman and Co. went on as stock and station agents in 1934.

The Cooperative butter factory realised great success with the expansion of dairying, with cream increasing in price around fourfold between the years 1918 and 1929. In 1923 T. N. and W. F. Stephenson developed a new butter factory, Lakeland's Butter, and became known for its prize-winning butter "Golden Lake" and "Silver Lake".

In the war years and after the freezing of rabbits became a significant local industry. In 1915 over one thousand crates a week were packed and dispatched for processing at a factory in Melbourne. In 1925 a soap-making factory was set up at the lower wharf with Josef Proppe, a soap expert from Westphalia in Germany as manager. The company adopted the name "Polaso" for its trade name. Besides soap the factory produced toilet soap, boot black and floor polish. A confectionery factory making Sno Balls, marshmallows, popcorn, toffees and other sweets was started in 1930 by Mrs. E. B. Greig. Numerous other factories opened in the 1920s and 1930s which consisted of a plaster sheet factory, Rocla Pipes Ltd, which produced reinforced concrete pipes on a site in Rupert Street, and Bairnsdale By-Products, which processed bone-meal, bone grit and meat meal.

Founded in 1923 was Bairnsdale Motors on the corner of Buchanan and Main Streets; it was later renamed The Big Garage. Brodribb Motors was founded in 1934 and G.P. Motors which took over Winson's Garage in 1939. A café owned by Lee Lett and Russell opening in 1932 and boasted that it had the town's first neon sign.

One of the largest employers within the Bairnsdale area is Patties Foods, which started in 1966 from a local bakery in Lakes Entrance and expanded to Bairnsdale in 1985.

Curtis Australia is a pen-manufacturing business in Mcleod Street that original started as 'Something Special' Jewellers in 1990.

Fennings Timber produces kiln-dried hardwood sourced from the Tambo Valley forests.

== Religion ==
Several churches serve the Bairnsdale community including Catholic, Anglican, Pentecostal, Presbyterian, Uniting, and Seventh-day Adventist. According to the 2021 census, the most common responses for religion in Bairnsdale (urban centres and localities) were no religion 46.2%, Catholic 15.6%, Anglican 13.2%, Uniting Church 3.8%, and unstated 8.7%. Overall, in 2016, 43.9% of the population nominated a religion, and 47.0% said they had no religion, compared with 42.2% and 48.2% respectively for East Gippsland Shire.

Tennyson Smith, the ardent prohibitionist, evangelist and teetotaller, visited Bairnsdale in February 1920 and gained many supporters when he initiated a branch of the Woman's Christian Temperance Union. The movement was unsuccessful when they met with a violent opposition who interrupted meetings and threw stones at Tennyson as he returned to Adelaide House (171 Main Street) where they broke windows and tried to gain access to the building. The prompt arrival of Constable Martin, who fired a revolver in the air and arrested a leading trouble-maker, broke up the disturbance.

== 2019–20 bushfires ==
During the 2019–20 Australian bushfire season an evacuation centre was established in Bairnsdale at the Bairnsdale Football pavilion.

== Notable people ==
- Tom Alvin, Carlton footballer
- Jon Ballantyne, AFL footballer and The Phonse Kyne Award winner 1994
- Dora Isabel Baudinet, nurse born at Coongulmerang, philanthropist
- Terry Bourke, filmmaker, director and writer
- Callum Chambers, West Coast and Carlton footballer
- Edward Coate, flying ace of the Second World War
- Lock Crowther, multihull sailboat designer
- Kevin Coverdale, Hawthorn football player and coach
- Slim Dusty (David Gordon Kirkpatrick), country music singer-songwriter; lived at Metung, 31 km (19 mi) SE of Bairnsdale
- Leigh Hobbs, children's author and illustrator
- Alfred William Howitt, anthropologist, explorer and naturalist
- Edward Jones, celebrity stalker
- Sir Albert Lind, farmer and politician
- Charlotte McShane, Scottish-born triathlete and the 2013 U23 ITU world triathlon champion
- Hal Porter, author
- Brian Royal, Western Bulldogs footballer
- Kat Stewart, actress
- Grant Robert Sutherland, cytogeneticist
- Will Tomlinson, professional boxer and IBO super-featherweight world champion
- Cameron White, Test cricketer
- David Williamson, playwright
- Sophie Molineux, Australian cricketer
