= Bennison =

Bennison is a surname. Notable people with the surname include:

- Amira Bennison, historian of the Middle East, senior lecturer in Middle Eastern and Islamic Studies in the University of Cambridge
- Andrew Bennison (1866–1942), American screenwriter and film director
- Charles Bennison, 15th bishop of the Episcopal Diocese of Pennsylvania
- Hanna Bennison (born 2002), Swedish footballer
- Ishia Bennison, British actress on television and stage
- John Bennison (1926–2017), Australian company executive
- Louis Bennison (1883–1929), American stage and silent film actor
- Vicky Bennison, British producer of Pasta Grannies

== See also ==
- Bennison Island, uninhabited granite island near the northern coast of Wilsons Promontory National Park
- Bennison railway station (originally Franklin River) was a railway station on the South Gippsland line in South Gippsland, Victoria
