= Edward Coate =

Australian flying ace

Edward Ernest Coate
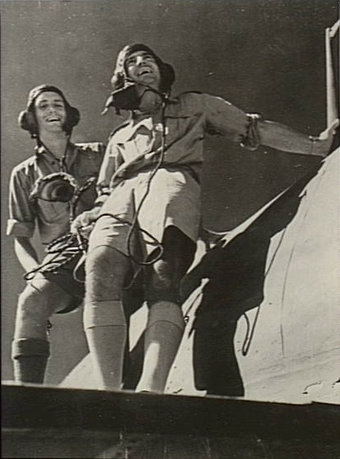
- Coate, on the right, next to his navigator, 1942
- Born: 13 August 1908; Cunningham, Victoria, Australia
- Died: 18 March 1995 (aged 86); East St Kilda, Victoria, Australia
- Burial place: Springvale Botanical Cemetery
- Military career
- Allegiance: Australia
- Branch: Royal Australian Air Force
- Service years: 1940–1945
- Rank: Flight Lieutenant
- Nickname: Ern
- Units: No. 252 Squadron; No. 227 Squadron; No. 272 Squadron
- Conflicts: Second World War; North African campaign; Tunisian campaign
- Awards: Distinguished Flying Cross and bar

Edward Ernest Coate, DFC & Bar (13 August 1908 – 18 March 1995) was an Australian flying ace of the Royal Australian Air Force (RAAF) during the Second World War. He was credited with at least nine aerial victories.

From Cunningham in Victoria, Coate joined the RAAF in October 1940. After completing his flight training he was sent to the United Kingdom where he was posted to No. 252 Squadron, at the time based in Egypt, and then served with No. 227 Squadron. In mid-1942, he was transferred to No. 272 Squadron and while serving with this unit destroyed several German and Italian aircraft. Awarded the Distinguished Flying Cross (DFC) in February 1943. Two months later, he received a bar to his DFC. Later in the year he returned to Australia and performed instructing and staff duties before being released from the RAAF in May 1945. In civilian life, he worked in the transportation sector and then in engineering. He died in the Melbourne suburb of East St Kilda, aged 86.

== Early life ==
Edward Ernest Coate was born on 13 August 1908 at Cunningham in the state of Victoria, Australia, the son of a contractor, David Coate, and Rubeena Ellen (née Peterson). His birth name was actually Ernest Edward but he preferred to reverse his given names. He graduated from the Bairnsdale School of Mines with a Diploma of Electrical and Mechanical Engineering. He subsequently operated an automotive workshop in Bairnsdale.

== Second World War ==
In October 1940, Coate, known as Ern, joined the Royal Australian Air Force (RAAF) to train as aircrew. After initial flight training in Australia, he went to Canada under the Empire Air Training Scheme for further tuition. He was commissioned in May 1941, and proceeded to the United Kingdom shortly afterwards to serve with the Royal Air Force (RAF). In March 1942, he was posted to No. 252 Squadron, a Coastal Command fighter squadron based in Egypt and operating the Bristol Beaufighter heavy fighter.

Coate was soon transferred to No. 227 Squadron. This was another unit equipped with the Beaufighter, and was based at Luqa on Malta, operating in an anti-shipping role. Again Coate's stay was brief and in mid-1942 he was sent to No. 272 Squadron, another Coastal Command squadron operating Beaufighters in the Middle East. His new unit carried out convoy patrols, escort duties, and ground-attack missions targeting the German and Italian airfields in North Africa. He achieved his first aerial victory on 30 September, when he destroyed a Heinkel He 111 medium bomber over the Sollum-Barrani road in northeast Egypt.

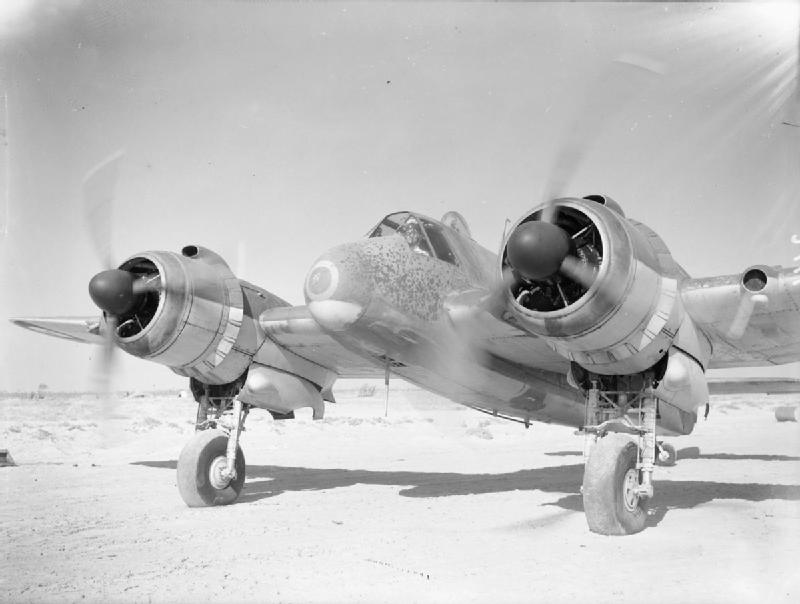
A Bristol Beaufighter of No. 272 Squadron at Idku, in Egypt

=== Tunisian campaign ===
In early November 1942, No. 272 Squadron moved to Malta to support the Allied landings in Tunisia and sought to intercept transport aircraft flying between Sicily and North Africa. On 10 November, when attacking El Aouina airfield, Coate shot down a Junkers Ju 290 transport, damaged three Junkers Ju 87 dive bombers and destroyed another Ju 87 on the airfield itself. Two days later, flying to the southeast of the Italian island of Pantelleria, he destroyed one Savoia-Marchetti SM.82 transport and damaged another. On 23 November, he shot down a CANT Z.506 Airone floatplane near Sfax. The following day while on a patrol he destroyed a six-engined Blohm & Voss BV 222 flying boat, seeing it crash into the sea 30 miles (48 km) from Linosa. He was reported to be the first airman to destroy a BV 222. Shortly after the encounter, he and his two wingmen sighted a Dornier Do 24 flying boat and engaged this as well; it escaped with some damage.

On 3 December, Coate helped another pilot destroy a Junkers Ju 88 medium bomber off the Libyan coast and six days later he shot down a Junkers Ju 52 transport. He also damaged another Ju 52 in the same area, over the Gulf of Hammamet. In a second sortie the same day, he damaged a Ju 88. On 11 December, newly promoted to flight lieutenant, he shot down two Ju 52s encountered southwest of Sicily; one of these crashed-landed on Lampedusa Island. He also damaged a Ju 52 in the engagement. On 16 January 1943, he achieved his last aerial victory, destroying a Ju 88 near Lampedusa Island. The next month, he was awarded the Distinguished Flying Cross (DFC). This was followed in April by the award of a Bar to his DFC. The published citation read:

This officer is an extremely efficient and fearless flight commander. He invariably executes his tasks with great determination, setting a most inspiring example. In attacks on shipping in the harbour at Sousse and in attacks on road and rail transport, Flight Lieutenant Coate has achieved success. In air combat he has destroyed at least nine and damaged several more enemy aircraft. His services have been of great value.

— London Gazette, No. 35989, 23 April 1943

=== Later war service ===
At the time of the announcement of the Bar to Coate's DFC, he had ended his tour of operations with No. 272 Squadron and had been rested. In June 1943, he returned to Australia. He was posted to the RAAF's No. 5 Operational Training Unit, at Wagga Wagga in New South Wales, carrying out instructing duties. He was later a staff officer, based at RAAF headquarters in Melbourne and involved in intelligence duties, being well regarded for his efficiency. He was discharged from the RAAF on 16 May 1945; he had sought a release on compassionate grounds. He ended the war credited with nine aerial victories, plus a half share in another aircraft destroyed. He was also credited with one aircraft destroyed on the ground and eight damaged.

== Later life ==
Coate returned to Bairnsdale and worked in the transportation sector and then, following a move to Melbourne in the late 1960s, as an engineer. He died at East St Kilda, a suburb of Melbourne, on 18 March 1995. Survived by his wife and two children, his remains were cremated and interred at Springvale Botanical Cemetery in Springvale, Melbourne.
