= Corner Inlet Marine National Park =

Marine national park in Victoria, Australia

- IUCN category II (national park)
- Location within Victoria
- Location: Victoria
- Nearest city: Port Albert
- Coordinates: 38°46′S 146°20′E
- Area: 15.5 km^{2} (6.0 sq mi)
- Established: 16 November 2002
- Governing body: Parks Victoria
- Website: http://parkweb.vic.gov.au/explore/parks/corner-inlet-marine-national-park

The Corner Inlet Marine National Park is a protected marine national park located in the South Gippsland region of Victoria, Australia. The 1,550-hectare (3,800-acre) marine park is situated approximately 200 kilometres (120 mi) southeast of Melbourne and contains part of Corner Inlet.

The park is located adjacent to the Wilsons Promontory National Park and integrally linked to Corner Inlet Marine and Coastal Park and forms part of an area that has been recognised as a wetland of international significance under the Ramsar Convention.

== See also ==
- Protected areas of Victoria
- Granite Island (Victoria), part of the boundary of the northern section of the park
- Bennison Island, part of the boundary of the southern section of the park
