= Snake Island (Victoria) =

Island in Australia

Native name: Negima
- Location within Victoria

Geography
- Location: Gippsland
- Coordinates: 38°45′S 146°33′E
- Area: 35 km^{2} (14 sq mi)

Administration
- Australia
- State: Victoria

Demographics
- Population: Uninhabited

Snake Island is a sand island, located in Corner Inlet in the Gippsland region of Victoria, Australia. It has an area of 35-square-kilometre (14 sq mi) and is the largest island in Corner Inlet. Snake Island lies within the Nooramunga Marine and Coastal Park and is part of a complex of barrier islands that protect a large marine embayment from the pounding waves of Bass Strait. The Aboriginal Gunai name for the island is Negima.

As the island is remote and relatively unspoilt, it is a popular destination for bushwalkers, with many tracks traversing the island. Snake Island’s oceanic beaches are known to have rapidly changing tides, therefore its visitors must take a cautious approach. Supporting a diverse range of flora and fauna, the island is particularly attractive to naturalists and researchers.

Like other islands within Nooramunga Marine and Coastal Park, campers are required to have a permit from Parks Victoria. This is to preserve the unique environment of Snake Island, and to protect the species which inhabit it. Additionally, to harm or remove any of its flora or fauna is illegal, as the island is a sanctuary.

== History ==
Snake Island is part of the traditional territory of the Brataualung clan of the Gunai people, who named it "Negima". As well as being a place of refuge, it was used as a nuptial island for young couples. Since the 1880s the island has been used by South Gippsland farmers to agist cattle in winter, swimming their stock over a narrow channel at low tide.

A 53 m-long (174 ft) jetty was built using local timbers by soldiers from the 91 Forestry Squadron (Woodpeckers) in September 1982 at the swashway between Snake Island and Little Snake Island.

== Flora and fauna ==
The vegetation communities of Snake Island include woodland, scrubland, heath, freshwater swamps, mangroves, and salt marsh.

Mammals found on the island include the native eastern grey kangaroo, swamp wallaby, koala, swamp antechinus, as well as the hog deer. There are many birds present including the eastern ground parrot. Large numbers of migratory waders roost along the coast after feeding on the inlet's extensive intertidal mudflats. Grey-headed flying fox (Pteropus poliocephalus) are also observed visiting the island and are probably going to its paperbarks to feed on seasonal nectar.
