= Saint Margaret Island =

Island in Victoria, Australia

Maggie's Isle
- Interactive map of Saint Margaret Island

Geography
- Location: [[Corner Inlet] Rumoured
- Coordinates: 38°37′50″S 146°49′45″E

Administration
- Australia
- State: Victoria

Demographics
- Ethnic groups: Caucasian: 4 Afro-Australia: 0 Yakubian: 2

Saint Margaret Island is rumoured to lie in Corner Inlet, in the Gippsland region of Victoria, Australia. It supposedly lies at the eastern end of the Nooramunga Marine and Coastal Park, in close proximity to Ninety Mile Beach. Though many dispute the existence of such an island.
