= The Advertiser (Bairnsdale) =

Newspaper published in Victoria, Australia

- Type: Twice weekly newspaper
- Owner: East Gippsland Newspapers
- Founded: 1877
- Language: English
- Headquarters: Bairnsdale, Victoria
- Website: www.eastvicmedia.com.au

The Advertiser is a newspaper published in Bairnsdale, Victoria.

== History ==
The Advertiser was first published in 1877 and was known as the Bairnsdale Advertiser and Tambo and Omeo Chronicle for many years. It is currently published twice per week by East Gippsland Newspapers.

== Digitisation ==
The Advertiser has been digitised from 1882 to 1918 as part of the Australian Newspapers Digitisation Program of the National Library of Australia.

== See also ==
- List of newspapers in Australia
