= Nagle College =

Nagle College, Bairnsdale, Victoria

Location
- Bairnsdale, East Gippsland, Victoria; Australia; 37°50′15″S 147°35′13″E

Information
- Type: Independent co-educational secondary day school
- Motto: Latin: Luceat Lux Vestra (Let your light shine)
- Religious affiliations: Presentation Sisters (former); Salesians of Don Bosco
- Denomination: Roman Catholic
- Patron saint: The Venerable Nano Nagle
- Established: 1958; 68 years ago
- Founders: Presentation Sisters
- Principal: Doug Doherty
- Years: 7–12
- Enrolment: 950+
- Campus type: Regional
- Colours: Green and yellow
- Website: www.nagle.vic.edu.au

Nagle College is an independent Roman Catholic co-educational secondary day school located in Bairnsdale in the East Gippsland region of Victoria, Australia.

== Background and location ==
Nagle College was established in 1958 to provide a Catholic secondary education for the families in the parishes of East Gippsland. The College was founded by the Presentation Sisters who provided the leadership of the College until 1975. The school is named after the Sisters' patron, The Venerable Nano Nagle. Rod Nicholson was Principal from 1976 until 1988. The Salesians of Don Bosco took responsibility for the College in 1990.

The school began in Francis Street and moved to a site on the western edge of the town in 1979.

== Uniform ==
The winter uniform consists of dress shirts, tie and pants or skirt. The summer uniform consists of a dress for girls, and a shirt and shorts for boys. Juniors (year level 7–9) wear white shirts and seniors (year level 10–12) wear a white dress shirt. Seniors also wear a blazer and juniors have the option to wear a jumper or a spray jacket.

The sport uniform (for sports classes) consists of a shirt of the house colour (see below) and shorts or leggings.

== House system ==
There are seven different houses that exist at Nagle College. Bosco house is the newest house, added in the late 1990s when student numbers increased.

The houses are as follows:

- Avila House (yellow) – Teresa of Ávila Patron
- Bosco House (white) – John Bosco Patron
- Chisholm House (maroon) – Caroline Chisholm
- MacKillop House (orange)(originally brown) – Mary MacKillop Patron
- Newman House (red) – John Henry Newman Patron
- Polding House (blue) – Bede Polding Patron
- Xavier House (green) – Francis Xavier Patron

== Music department ==
Music is compulsory in years 7 and 8. Students can decide to continue the subject or not.

Nagle College has several different bands and performance groups, including: choir, strings band (Tunes), show band (Cookies & Cream), percussion ensemble (Beat It!), next generation band, and junior and senior guitar ensemble.

== Practical subjects ==
Students at Nagle College are exposed to many practical subjects as well as non-practical including: Woodwork, Sewing, Cooking, Metalwork (for later years), animal care (for later years), PE, Art, Drama, Photography and many more.

Woodwork, Sewing, Art, Drama and Cooking is compulsory in year 7 and 8.

== See also ==
- List of non-government schools in Victoria, Australia
