= Bennison Island =

Island near Wilsons Promontory in Victoria, Australia

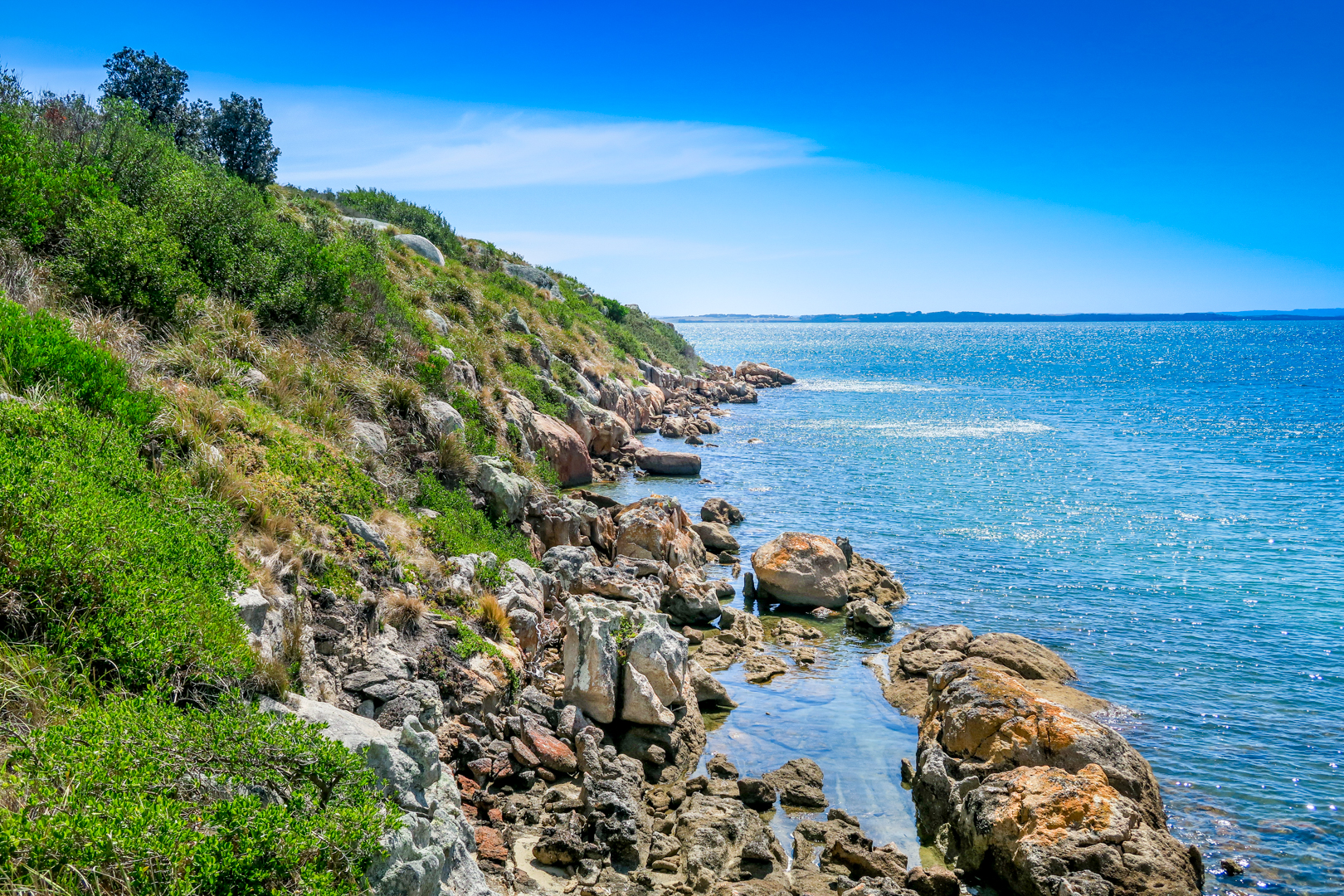

- Location within South Gippsland Shire

Geography
- Location: Corner Inlet
- Coordinates: 38°50′33″S 146°22′09″E
- Area: 7.7 ha (19 acres)
- Length: 300 m (1000 ft)
- Width: 250 m (820 ft)
- Highest elevation: 46 m (151 ft)

Administration
- Australia
- State: Victoria

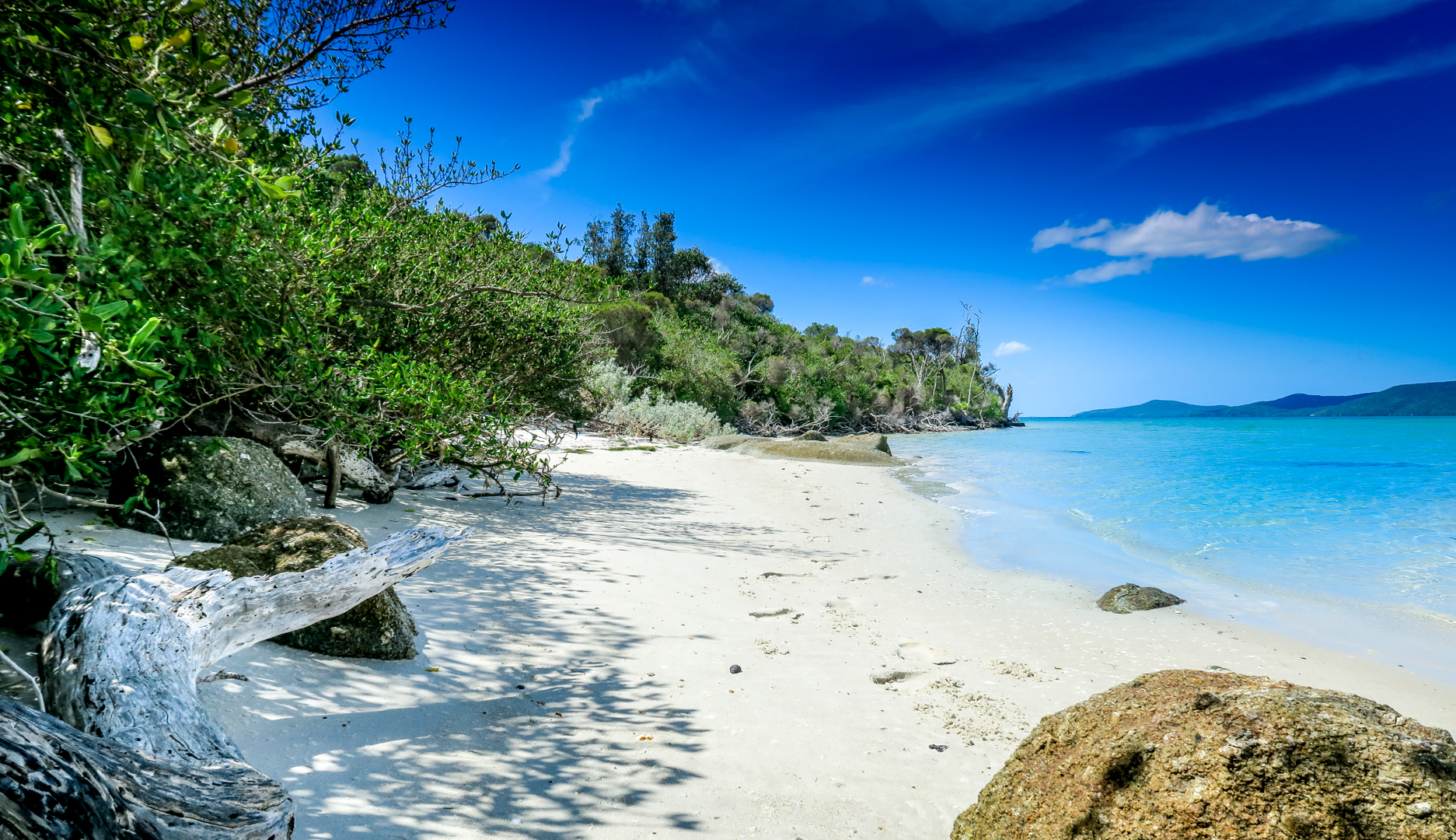
Bennison's Southern Beach

Bennison Island is an uninhabited granite island in Corner Inlet near the northern coast of Wilsons Promontory, in Victoria, Australia.

Access is by boat at high tide.

The island is part of Wilsons Promontory National Park and the surrounding waters are within Corner Inlet Marine National Park and Corner Inlet Marine and Coastal Park.
