= Callum Chambers =

Australian rules footballer (born 1979)

Personal information
- Born: 19 November 1979 (age 46)
- Original team: Lucknow / Gippsland Power
- Debut: Round 10, 12 May 2000, West Coast vs. Hawthorn, at Subiaco
- Height: 183 cm (6 ft 0 in)
- Weight: 79 kg (174 lb)

Playing career^{1}
Years	Club	Games (Goals)
1998–2004	West Coast	54 (38)
2005–2006	Carlton	12 (3)
Total		66 (41)
- ^{1} Playing statistics correct to the end of 2006.

Career highlights
- Carlton Pre-season premiership side 2005.

Callum Chambers (born 19 November 1979) is an Australian rules footballer who has played in the Australian Football League.

He was recruited as the number 13 draft pick in the 1997 AFL draft from Lucknow, Victoria. Callum made his debut for the West Coast Eagles in Round 10, 2000 against Hawthorn.

He was a key player for the club during their struggles at the bottom of the ladder in the 2001–02 season. However, as the Eagles' midfield became more competitive with the arrival of new players, he found it difficult to secure a regular place in the team.

During this period, he played many games in the WAFL; initially for West Coast's WAFL-affiliate, East Perth (2000–01); and then (after that affiliation ended) with West Perth (2002–04). He won a WAFL premiership at each club, in 2000 and 2003 respectively.

Chambers was traded to the Carlton Football Club at the end of the 2004 season. There was much hype surrounding Callum at the club, as he was the fastest player over long distances in the history of the club, dashing long-distance records in trials. He showed glimpses of brilliance as he helped the team to win the 2005 Pre-Season premiership. However, his form faded away fast in the main season struggled to have much impact at AFL level, playing most of his 2006 for the Northern Bullants seniors. He was delisted at the end of the 2006 season.

From 2007 until 2010, Chambers returned to the West Perth Football Club. In 2008, Chambers played an excellent season, and finished second for the Sandover Medal, two votes behind Peel's Hayden Ballantyne. In 2011, Chambers moved to the Cervantes Football Club in the Central Midlands Coastal Football League; he remains there as of 2015, and won premierships with the club in 2011, 2012 and 2013.
