= Agnes River (Australia) =

River in Victoria, Australia

Agnes The Little
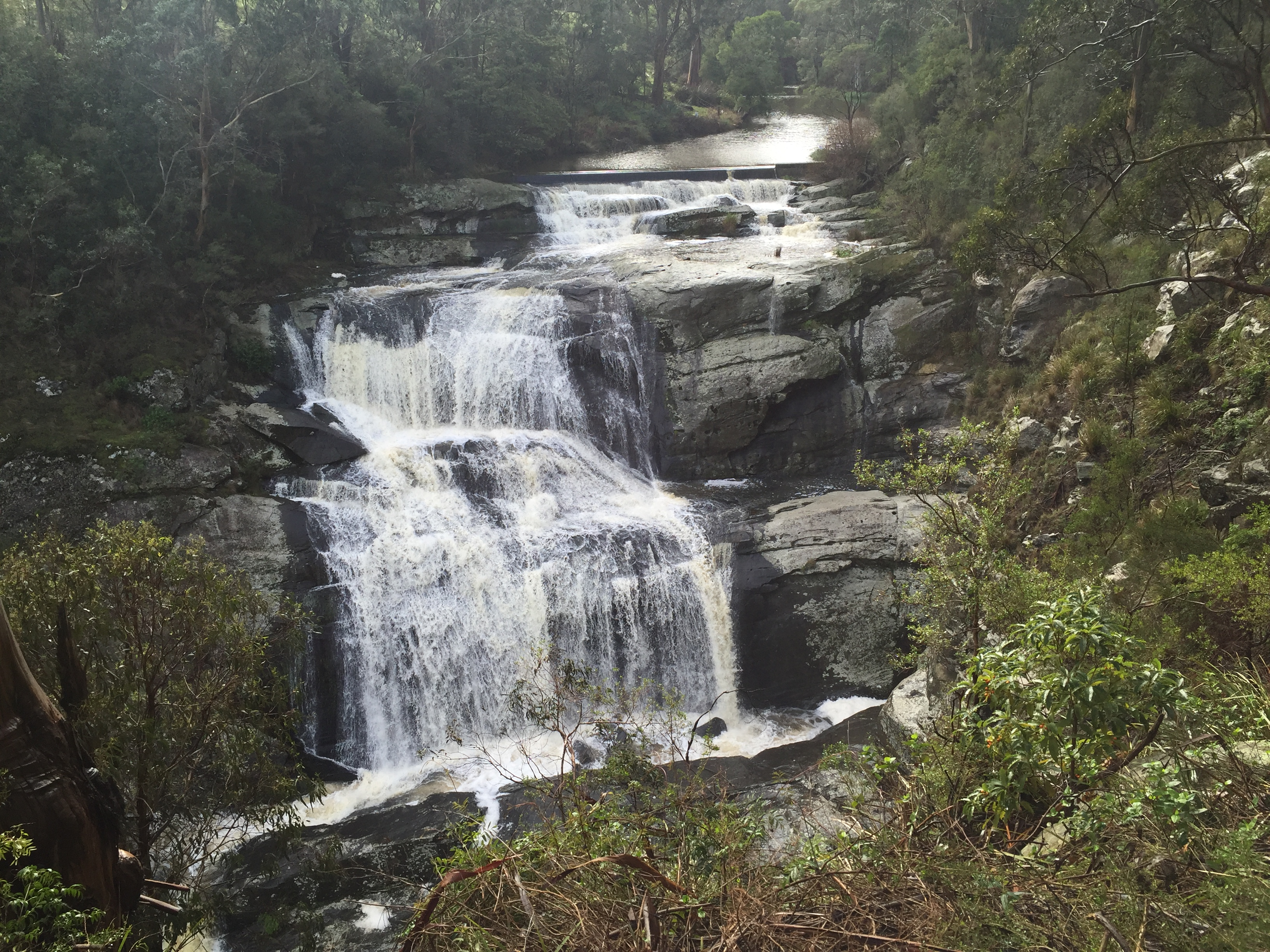
- Agnes River in Toora, Victoria

- Location of the Agnes River mouth in Victoria
- Etymology: (i) From the Ages River, after 'Agnes,' daughter of John Gellion, an early settler. (ii) Named by Governor La Trobe in honour of his daughter, Agnes.
- Native name: Kut-wut (Gunai: Brataualung)

Location
- Country: Australia
- State: Victoria
- Region: South East Coastal Plain (IBRA), South Gippsland
- Local government area: South Gippsland Shire

Physical characteristics
- Source: Strzelecki Ranges
  - location: below Beech Hill
  - elevation: 560 m (1,840 ft)
- Mouth: Corner Inlet, Bass Strait
  - location: southeast of Toora
  - coordinates: 38°41′10″S 146°22′28″E
  - elevation: 0 m (0 ft)

Basin features
- River system: West Gippsland catchment
- Waterfall: Agnes Falls

The Agnes River is a perennial river of the West Gippsland catchment, in the South Gippsland region of the Australian state of Victoria.

== Course and features ==
Agnes River rises below Beech Hill in state forestry area within the Strzelecki Ranges, and flows generally south in a highly meandering course, before reaching its mouth in Corner Inlet of Bass Strait, southeast of the town of Toora in the South Gippsland Shire. The river descends 570 metres (1,870 ft) over its course.

The Agnes River sub-catchment area is managed by the West Gippsland Catchment Management Authority.

The river is traversed by the South Gippsland Highway between Toora and Welshpool.

== Etymology ==
In the Aboriginal Brataualung language the name of the river is Kut-wut, with no defined meaning.

The river derives its current name from the Ages River, after Agnes, daughter of John Gellion, an early settler, and was named by Governor La Trobe in 1845 in honour of his daughter, Agnes.

== See also ==
- List of rivers of Australia
