= Blond Bay State Game Reserve =

Game reserve in Victoria, Australia

Coordinates: 38°01′S 147°29′E

- Blond Bay Game Reserve
- Location: Victoria, Australia
- Nearest city: Bairnsdale
- Area: 4,942 acres (20.00 km^{2})

The Blond Bay State Game Reserve is a 2000 ha game reserve in Victoria, Australia. It lies on the north shore of Lake Victoria in the Gippsland Lakes about 20 km south-west of the town of Bairnsdale. It is used for seasonal duck and quail hunting as well as the balloted hunting of Hog Deer. The habitat consists of coastal heath and Banksia woodland with some wetland areas. It contains the threatened plant species Dwarf Kerrawang (Rulingia prostrata).
