= Bairnsdale Secondary College =

Coordinates: 37°49′30″S 147°36′17″E

Bairnsdale Secondary College (formerly Bairnsdale High School, Bairnsdale Technical School)
- Bairnsdale; Victoria

Information
- Type: Public, co-educational, secondary, day school
- Established: 1912
- Principal: Tony Roberts
- Years: 7 to 12
- Enrollment: approx. 1,200
- Website: bairnsdalesc.vic.edu.au

Bairnsdale Secondary College is a public co-educational secondary school located in Bairnsdale, Victoria, Australia. As of 2010 the school has approximately 1,100 students from Year 7 to Year 12.

== Music ==
Bairnsdale secondary college has 7 main bands consisting of the junior band, intermediate band, senior band, brass ensemble, swing band, string ensemble and senior string ensemble all performing locally and interstate every year. The once extensive music program was defunded in 2020, despite community protests.

== History ==
Bairnsdale Secondary College opened its doors in 1912.
