= Curtis Australia =

Luxury goods manufacturer based in Melbourne, Australia (2002)

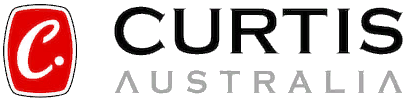
- Type: Private
- Industry: Luxury goods
- Founded: 2002; 24 years ago
- Headquarters: Melbourne, Australia
- Products: Jewellery, watches, fountain, ballpoint and rollerball pens
- Website: curtisaustralia.com

Curtis Australia is an Australian manufacturing company of luxury goods, based in Melbourne. Products manufactured by the company are handcrafted jewellery, watches and writing implements such as fountain, ballpoint and rollerball pens.

Writing instruments produced by the brand usually contain elements of precious metal or gemstones. Pen models are often solid sterling silver, such as the Adventurer Series or a combination of materials such as evident in the Dream Writer range. Founder Glenn Curtis is a Fellow of the Gold & Silversmiths Guild of Australia and has been making jewellery in Australia for 40 years.

== History ==
Curtis Australia was established in 2002 by Glenn Curtis, a craftsman that manufactured writing instruments, as part of an overall change in company direction that will later lead to product collections being formed. In 2004, Curtis exhibits at the National Stationery Show of New York. By those times, Curtis began to export his products to the United States.

Three years later, Curtis introduced resin and sterling silver models to its pen ranges in the form of Classic, Elegance and Luxury models. In 2007, the company opened a showroom and office in Melbourne. The first luxury watches came in 2017, offering ladies and gentlemen models, in solid gold cases. Curtis, Australia took part in G'Day USA – an Australian Government initiative to promote Australian goods and services in the U. S.

In 2010, Curtis relocated to a new, purpose-built studio with increased space and capabilities to create pens and jewellery products. That same year, new pen models were introduced including the Streamline, Dream Writer and Brighton models. Streamline and Dreamwriter were acrylic resin bodied pens with sterling silver trim, while Brighton was a larger version solid silver pen that featured relief decoration on both barrel and cap areas.

In 2011, Glenn Curtis participated as a judge in the Rio tinto Diamonds Global Design held in NY. In late 2014, Curtis were chosen to contribute to the Robb Report Magazine's Ultimate Gift Guide, a collection of extreme luxury products and concepts aimed at the very wealthy. The Curtis pen designs included concepts called 'Artistry' - a gem set and gold pen drawing inspiration from decorative art history, and 'Racing the Wind' a design featuring a diamond set eagle and stallion. Both concepts are intended to prompt design commissions from the magazine's subscribers.

Curtis started to create solid gold watches released its first collection in 2017, using designs created and made in house, fitted with Swiss made movements.

== Products ==
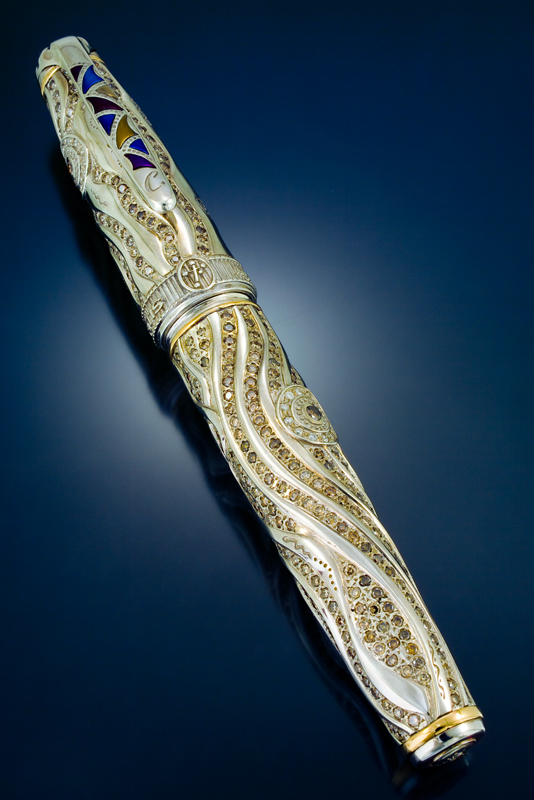
Colours of Australia Pen

Curtis pens feature an internally developed spring clip. This has allowed sterling silver, a material normally not strong enough for pen clips, to be deployed across their pen ranges.

Most high-end resin and silver pens are engineered using repetition tooling or machinery, leading to similar styles and design. Curtis pens are often sculptured with modelled surfaces in relief (source) and hand finished. This approach as led to recognition in industry publications.

Some Curtis pen models are decorated with imagery related to certain historical events. Examples of these include the 'Wildlife Warrior' pen, the 'Great Race' pen, the 'Race to the Pole' pen and the 'America 400' pen. The 'Wildlife Warrior' Pen was created as a philanthropic project to raise funds for the charity of the same name. The 'Race to the Pole' Pen commemorates the centenary of the race to the North Pole.

Curtis' 'Great Race Pen' marks the anniversary of 'the world's first auto race' 1908 New York to Paris Race while the 'America 400' has illustrative elements relating to the European settlement of North America. Pens in this series are heavily sculptured in solid sterling silver.

Curtis watches utilise different manufacturing techniques. Most conventional watch cases are subtractively produced, i.e. engineered from solid blocks of materials, leading to designs that often reflect manufacturing technique. Curtis watch case designs have been influenced by their background as precious metal jewellers and pen makers.

== Product lines ==
=== Pens ===
- 'Prestige' Collection (2006). Solid sterling silver pen series comprising eight initial models.
- Wildlife Warrior Pen (2009). A gem set solid gold pen featuring endangered wildlife from Australia and around the world in a series of bas relief carvings
- 'Superyachts' an online publication concerned with luxury goods compares Curtis Australia with Cartier as pen makers
- Morning Mist Necklet & Fountain Pen (2010), associated jewellery pieces. A two colour gold necklet and fountain pen set with Rio Tinto Diamonds 'Silvermist' Diamonds
- Jack Nicklaus Series (2011) This series covered significant achievements in the career of professional golfer Jack Nicklaus and includes pens that feature the Masters Tournament, the US Open and the Ryder Cup, with the British Open and the US PGA pen designs still in development.
- 'Signature' Pen launched (2013). Solid gold pen with a detailed carved eagle to the top, designed as a desk pen.
- 'The Ultimate Pen' (2014), a $1.2m pen design by Curtis features in the Robb Report December 2014 Issue, page 214 (author: John Lyon) as part of the luxury magazines 'Ultimate Gift Guide'

=== Jewellery ===
In addition to producing pens, Curtis also produces several jewellery collections, examples include the 'Flight of Fantasy' necklet and the 'Morning Mist' necklet. Recent additions include a range of two tone gold rings made by fusing different colours of solid gold into the one item and a range of pieces that include reclaimed Australian hardwoods.

- Morning Mist Collection Pen and Necklet (2010)
- Two Tone Gold Band Rings (2014)
- Curtis Australia appear in a series of articles in 'Gippsland Lifestyle' magazine that cover aspects of the company's activities (2017-2020

=== Watches ===
These were introduced in 2017 with a range of solid gold and gem set watches into its collections. Watches are bespoke and can be tailored to individual clients, and are themed to complement jewellery ranges. In 2020, Curtis introduced the 'Motima' watch, an 8 sided men's watch, and 'Sophia' and 'Grace', two ladies watches.

== Awards ==
- 2009 Robb Report Best of the Best
- 2010 Pen World magazine Readers Choice Award for Best Metal Mastery
