= Lucknow, Victoria =

Lucknow
- Town
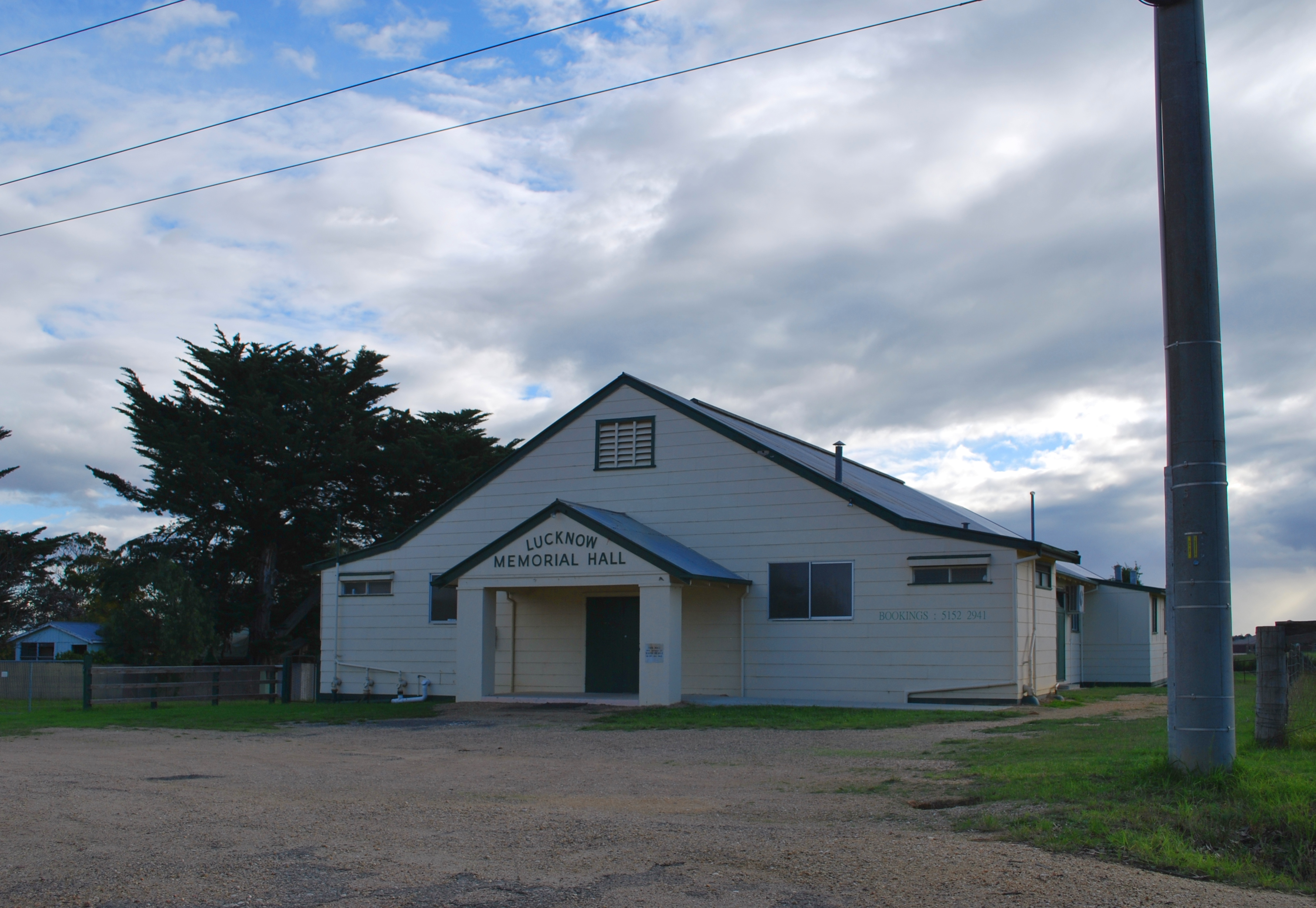
- Memorial hall at Lucknow

- Coordinates: 37°48′48″S 147°38′53″E
- Country: Australia
- State: Victoria
- LGA: Shire of East Gippsland
- Location: 287 km (178 mi) E of Melbourne; 5 km (3.1 mi) E of Bairnsdale

Government
  - State electorate: Gippsland East
  - Federal division: Gippsland

Population
  - Total: 1,254 (2016 census)
- Postcode: 3875

Lucknow is a suburb of Bairnsdale in the Shire of East Gippsland, Victoria, Australia located on the Mitchell River. The locality is 287 kilometres (178 mi) east of the state capital, Melbourne.

At the 2016 census, Lucknow had a population of 1,254.
