= Corner Inlet =

Bay in Victoria, Australia

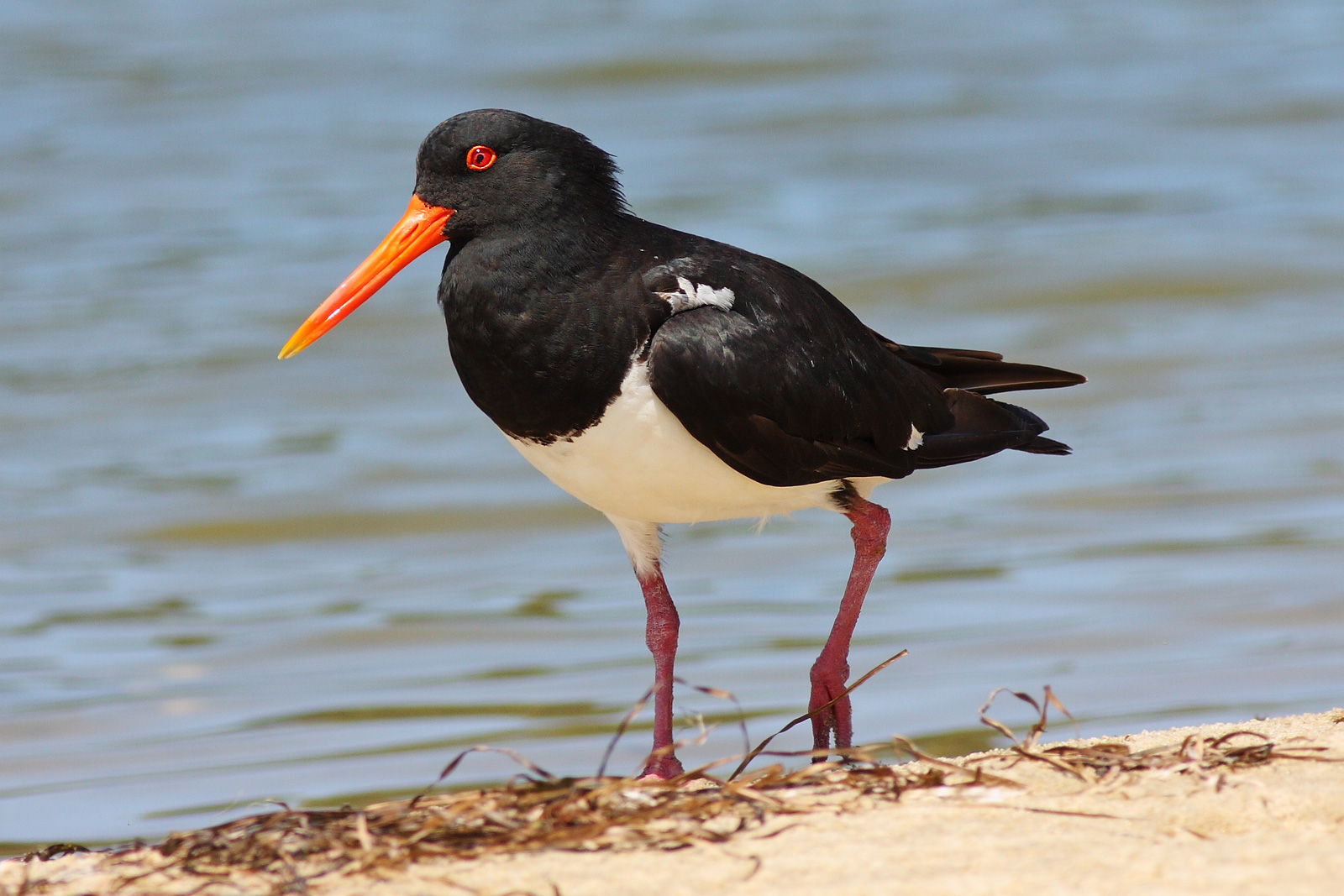
- Corner Inlet is an important site for pied oystercatchers

- Location in Victoria
- Location: South Gippsland, Victoria
- Coordinates: 38°45′57″S 146°20′21″E
- Primary inflows: Albert River; Agnes River
- Primary outflows: Bass Strait
- Basin countries: Australia
- Surface area: 600 km^{2} (230 sq mi)
- Islands: Snake, Sunday and Saint Margaret

Ramsar Wetland
- Designated: 15 December 1982
- Reference no.: 261

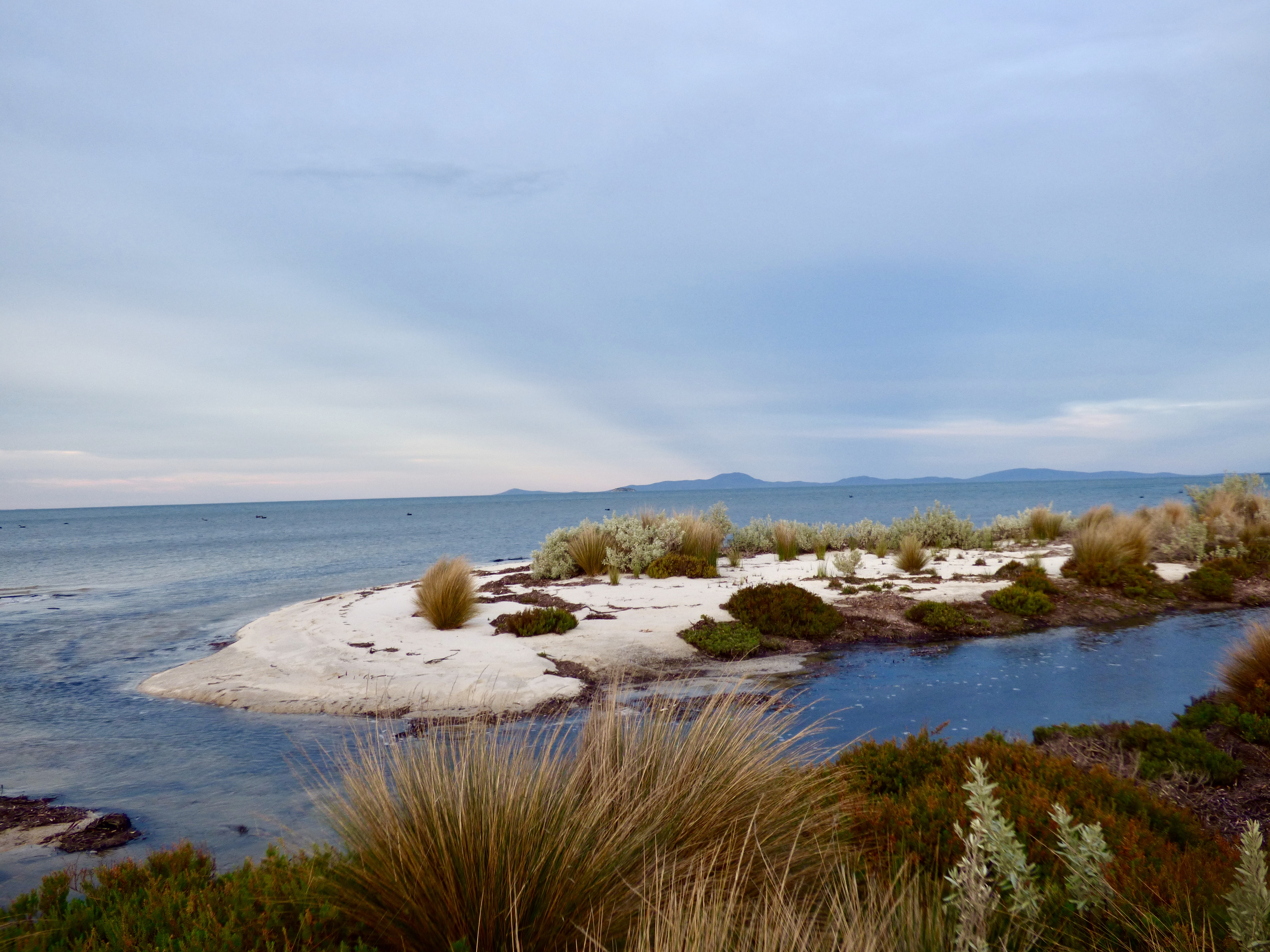
Corner Inlet, Ramsar Site with Wilsons Promontory National Park in background

The Corner Inlet is a 600-square-kilometre (230 sq mi) bay located 200 kilometres (120 mi) south-east of Melbourne in the South Gippsland region of Victoria, Australia. Of Victoria's large bays it is both the easternmost and the warmest. It contains intertidal mudflats, mangroves, salt marsh and seagrass meadows, sheltered from the surf of Bass Strait by a complex of 40 sandy barrier islands, the largest of which are Snake, Sunday and Saint Margaret Islands.

The inlet is protected as a Ramsar site by the Nooramunga and Corner Inlet Marine and Coastal Parks, and by part of it lying within the 1,550-hectare (3,800-acre) Corner Inlet Marine National Park. The inlet adjoins Wilsons Promontory in the west, extends to Ninety Mile Beach in the east, and supports large numbers of migratory waders and other birds as well a rich marine flora and fauna.

== History ==
Corner Inlet lies within the traditional lands of the Brataolong clan of the Gunai nation. In the early 1840s, European settlers moved into the area and established agricultural, mining and forestry enterprises. Commercial fishing became established in the 1860s. The surrounding land was originally covered by forest which has mostly since been cleared. It has become a popular tourist destination for recreational boating and fishing.

== Birds ==
Some 720 square kilometres (280 sq mi) of land and water covering Corner Inlet has been recognised by BirdLife International as an Important Bird Area. Containing the most extensive intertidal mudflats in Victoria, it supports over 1% of the world populations of chestnut teal, Far Eastern curlew, red-necked stint, pied and sooty oystercatchers and the hooded plover. The critically endangered orange-bellied parrot has occasionally been seen there.

== See also ==
- Agnes River
