= Clack Island =

Island in Queensland, Australia

- Interactive map of Clack Island

Geography
- Location: Northern Australia
- Coordinates: 14.047°S 144.261°E
- Area: 0.21 km^{2} (0.081 sq mi)

Administration
- Australia
- State: Queensland

Clack Island is part of the Great Barrier Reef Marine Park at the tip of Cape Melville, Queensland in Bathurst Bay, Australia.

It is north-east of Denham Island and Flinders Island in the Flinders Group National Park. It is around 21 hectares or 0.21 square km in size,

Clack Island has a major place in Aboriginal ritual and mythology, and also has a large number of paintings. It is the traditional centre for male ritual activities and is the resting-place of the two culture heroes, Itjibiya and Almbarrin, who are the dominant figures of traditional mythology in the region.
