= Stanley Island =

Island of Queensland, Australia

Coordinates: 14.153°S 144.235°E

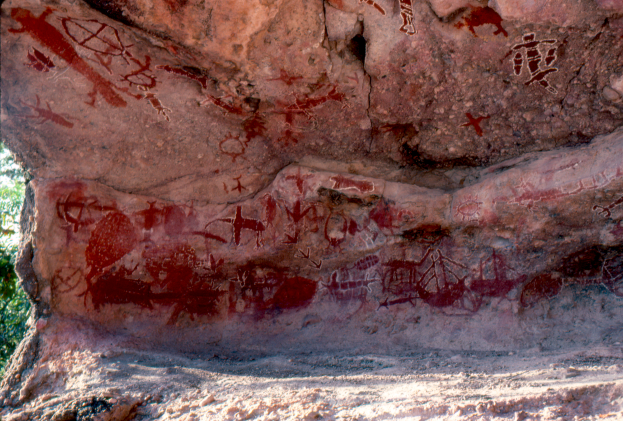
- The northern wall of Yintayin rock shelter
- Interactive map of Stanley Island

Geography
- Location: Coral Sea
- Archipelago: Flinders Group

Administration
- Australia
- State: Queensland
- Local government area: Shire of Cook

Stanley Island is part of the Great Barrier Reef Marine Park at the tip of Cape Melville, Queensland in Bathurst Bay. It is located North of Denham Island and Flinders Island in the Flinders Group National Park in Princess Charlotte Bay. The island is a popular tourist destination with fine anchorage between the islands and along various coastal stretches. Stanley Island was first declared a national park in 1939.

Cape Flinders is the name of the northern tip of Stanley Island and the ship Frederick was wrecked there in 1818.

== Rock art ==
Stanley island is an integral part of the mythological complex of the Flinders Group. There are several spectacular rock art sites on Stanley Island, the best known being the huge Yintayin rock shelter (Tindale's "Endaen") known as the "Ship" rock shelter located at 14°09'46.7"S 144°13'47.4"E. Other islands in the group also contain rock art, all of which are considered to be of international significance.

The rock art covering the walls of the Ship shelter shows ships from a number of nations, painted in red and white ochre on the red sandstone: sailing ships rigged in the distinctive styles of the European lugger and the Macassan (Indonesian) prau; a dugout canoe with a figure standing upright in it, hands outstretched. Some construe the images of European vessels with high sterns to be 16th or 17th century (Portuguese) ships, which is historically notable as the first reports of exploration of this coast to reach Europe are those from Captain James Cook's voyage aboard HMS Endeavour in 1770.

In shelters on nearby Castle Peak there are similar paintings: of a steam ship, and a detailed image of a lugger, identifiable as the Mildred, towing a dinghy. An important mythological site occurs at Muyu-Walin figuring in the major Itjibiya mythic cycle.

== See also ==
- List of islands of Australia
