= King Island (Queensland) =

Island in Queensland, Australia

- Interactive map of King Island

Geography
- Location: Coral Sea
- Coordinates: 14.096°S 144.333°E
- Adjacent to: Bathurst Bay

Administration
- Australia
- State: Queensland

King Island is part of the Great Barrier Reef Marine Park at the tip of Cape Melville, Queensland in Bathurst Bay.

It is northeast of Denham Island and Flinders Island in the Flinders Group National Park. King Island lies off the coast of Queensland.

== See also ==
- List of islands of Australia
