= Blackwood Island =

Island in Queensland, Australia

- Interactive map of Blackwood Island

Geography
- Location: Northern Australia
- Coordinates: 14.213°S 144.223°E
- Area: 1.6 km^{2} (0.62 sq mi)

Administration
- Australia
- State: Queensland

Blackwood Island is part of the Great Barrier Reef Marine Park at the tip of Cape Melville in Bathurst Bay, Queensland, Australia.

It is east of Denham Island and south-west of Flinders Island in the Flinders Group National Park. It is around 160 hectares or 1.6 square km in size.

The elevation of the terrain is approximately 73 metres above sea level.

Blackwood Island has a major place in Aboriginal ritual and mythology. Blackwood Island is of mythological significance to Aborigines. It symbolises the dead body of the whale speared by culture heroes Itjibiya and Almbarrin after leaving Bathurst Heads on their way to Clack Island where they now reside.
