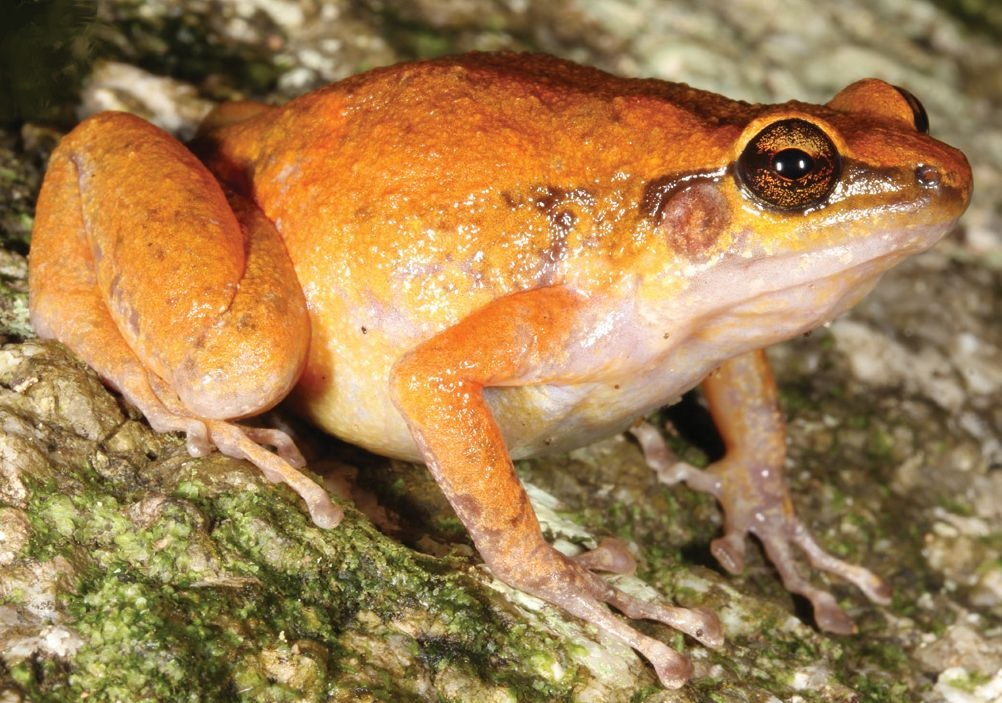
- Female Cophixalus zweifeli
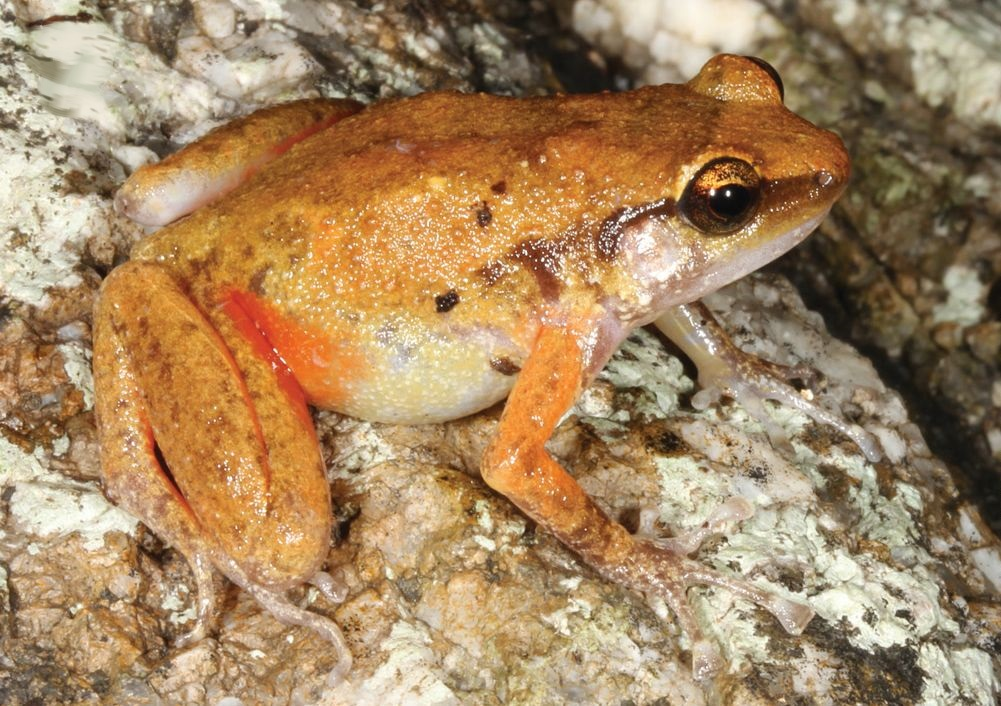
- Male Cophixalus zweifeli

Conservation status
- Least Concern (IUCN 3.1)

Scientific classification
- Kingdom: Animalia
- Phylum: Chordata
- Class: Amphibia
- Order: Anura
- Family: Microhylidae
- Genus: Cophixalus
- Species: C. zweifeli

Binomial name
- Cophixalus zweifeli Davies and McDonald, 1998

= Cophixalus zweifeli =

Species of frog

Cophixalus zweifeli is a species of frog in the family Microhylidae. It is endemic to northern Queensland, Australia, and only known from the area of its type locality in the Cape Melville National Park. The species was named to honour American herpetologist Richard G. Zweifel. Common name Zweifel's frog has been coined for it. It is one of the five northeast Australian Cophixalus species that are specialized in boulder field habitats.

Cophixalus zweifeli is restricted to the boulder fields of Cape Melville

== Description ==
Adult males measure 36–38 mm (1.4–1.5 in) and adult females 40–49 mm (1.6–1.9 in) in snout–vent length. The snout is elongated, truncated in dorsal view and straight, slightly projecting laterally. The tympanum is large but obscured dorsally. Fingers II–IV have greatly enlarged, truncated discs. The toe discs are also enlarged but smaller than those of the fingers. The dorsum is tan with some darker brown spots. A dark canthal stripe runs from the tip of the snout to slightly beyond the tympanum.

The male advertisement call is a single high-pitched "yelp" composed of hundreds of fine pulses.

== Habitat and conservation ==
Cophixalus zweifeli live in boulder fields amongst and adjacent to rainforest. They are nocturnal. Males call from boulders on the ground. The types were found in a boulder field near a creek, at the base of rocks and on a rock in a creek at 40–80 m (130–260 ft) above sea level. Cophixalus zweifeli is sympatric with Cophixalus petrophilus, but the latter is restricted to boulder fields largely devoid of vegetation, whereas the former is associated with boulders under or near rainforest.

In the past, logging was a threat to this species. At present, a more likely threat is habitat degradation caused by increased visitation to the Cape Melville National Park.
