= Maclear =

Maclear may refer to:

== People ==
- Sir Thomas Maclear (1794–1879), Irish-born South African astronomer
- Michael Maclear (1929-2018), Anglo-Canadian journalist, documentary filmmaker, and former correspondent
- George Maclear (born 1833), English clergyman, theological writer and headmaster
- John Maclear (1838–1907), commander of HMS Challenger from 1872 to 1876

== Places ==
- Maclear, Eastern Cape, a town in the Eastern Cape province, South Africa
- Maclear Island (Queensland), an island in the Great Barrier Reef Marine Park
- Maclear (crater), a lunar crater

== Other ==
- Maclear's Rat, an extinct species of rat formerly found on Christmas Island
