= Cape Melville National Park (Cape York Peninsula Aboriginal Land) =

National park in Queensland, Australia

- IUCN category II (national park)
- Cape Melville National Park (Cape York Peninsula Aboriginal Land)

- Location within Queensland
- Location: Queensland
- Nearest city: Cooktown
- Coordinates: 14°22′S 144°29′E
- Area: 1,370 km^{2} (530 sq mi)
- Established: 1973
- Governing body: Queensland Parks and Wildlife Service
- Website: https://parks.des.qld.gov.au/parks/cape-melville

Cape Melville National Park (Cape York Peninsula Aboriginal Land) is a national park in the Shire of Cook, Queensland, Australia. The national park was previously named Cape Melville National Park until it was renamed on 28 November 2013.

== Geography ==
The park is 1,711 km northwest of Brisbane. Its main features are the rocky headlands of Cape Melville, granite boulders of the Melville Range and beaches of Bathurst Bay.

The national park was the site of a 2013 National Geographic scientific expedition which discovered three new species. These were the Cape Melville leaf-tailed gecko, Cape Melville shade skink and the Blotched boulder-frog. The park is home to a wide variety of plant communities, including mangroves, rainforests, heathlands, woodlands and grasslands. The average elevation of the terrain is 43 metres.

== See also ==
- Protected areas of Queensland
