= Cyclone Mahina =

Australian region cyclone in 1899

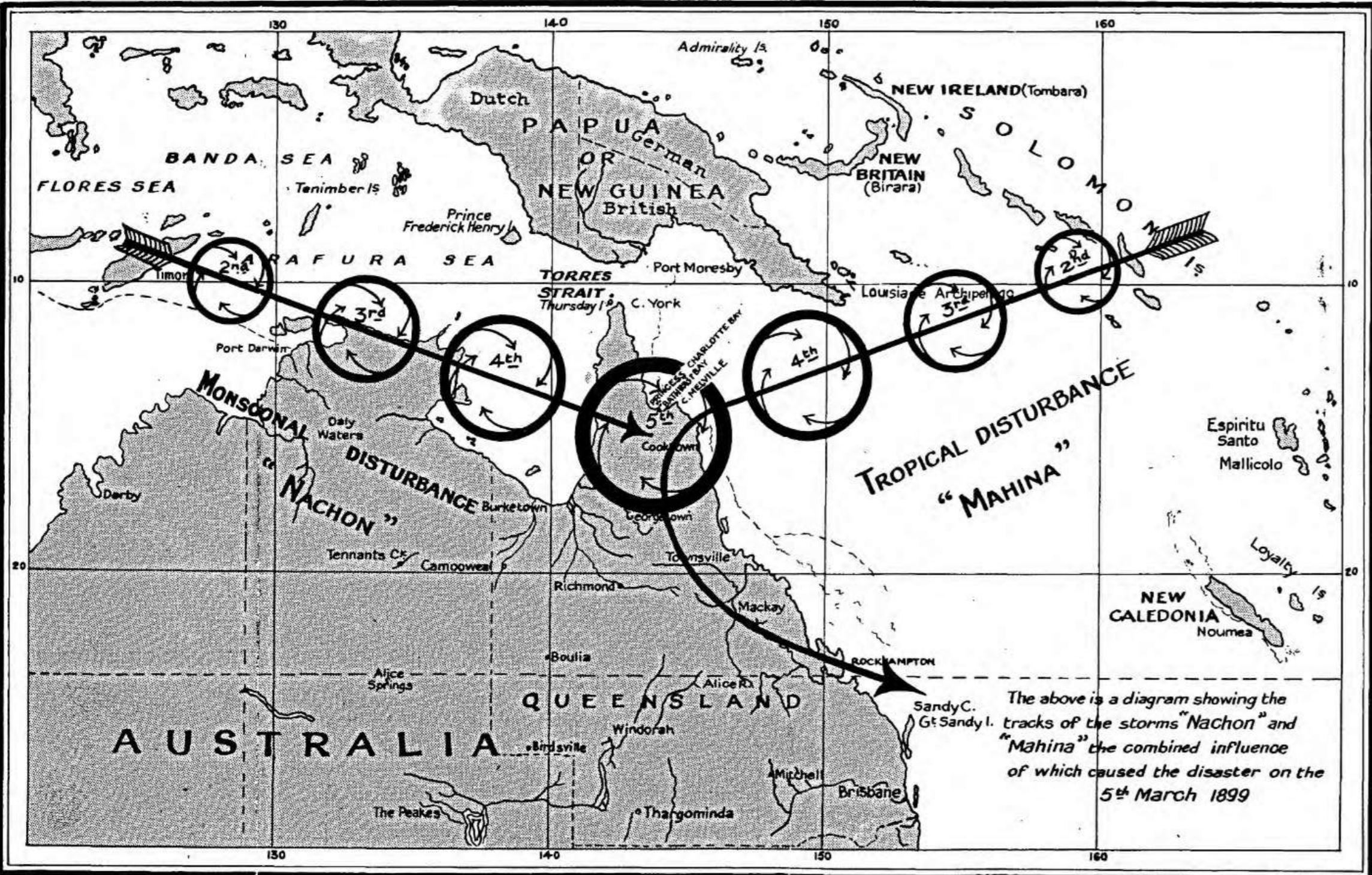
- An illustration by Clement Lindley Wragge displaying Cyclone Mahina's estimated path

Meteorological history
- Formed: 3 March 1899
- Dissipated: 10 March 1899

Unknown-strength storm
- Lowest pressure: 914 hPa (mbar); 26.99 inHg (Unofficially estimated as 880 hPa, being the lowest pressure in Southern Hemisphere, pending review)

Overall effects
- Fatalities: 307–410
- Damage: Unknown
- Areas affected: Far North Queensland
- Part of the Pre-1900 Australian region cyclone seasons

Cyclone Mahina was the deadliest cyclone in recorded Australian history, and also potentially the most intense tropical cyclone ever recorded in the Southern Hemisphere. Mahina struck Bathurst Bay, Cape York Peninsula, colonial Queensland, on 4 March 1899, and its winds and enormous storm surge combined to cause the deaths of more than 300 people.

While the Australian Bureau of Meteorology, which is the Regional Specialised Meteorological Centre of the basin, estimates Mahina's peak central pressure to be 914 hPa (26.99 inHg), the World Meteorological Organization is currently considering an application from Queensland scientists and researchers to have this value upgraded to 880 hPa (25.99 inHg), based on data from post-storm analysis. This would officially make Mahina the most intense cyclone recorded to have hit the Australian mainland, and the most intense tropical cyclone recorded making landfall anywhere in the world, as well as the most intense tropical cyclone ever recorded in the Southern Hemisphere, a title currently held by Cyclone Winston. Cyclone Mahina produced a 9-metre-high (30-foot) surge.

== Impact ==
Map plotting the storm's track and intensity, according to the Saffir–Simpson scale Map key Saffir–Simpson scale Tropical depression (≤38 mph, ≤62 km/h) Tropical storm (39–73 mph, 63–118 km/h) Category 1 (74–95 mph, 119–153 km/h) Category 2 (96–110 mph, 154–177 km/h) Category 3 (111–129 mph, 178–208 km/h) Category 4 (130–156 mph, 209–251 km/h) Category 5 (≥157 mph, ≥252 km/h) Unknown Storm type Tropical cyclone Subtropical cyclone Extratropical cyclone, remnant low, tropical disturbance, or monsoon depression

Tropical Cyclone Mahina struck Australia on 4 March 1899, with a likely minimum central pressure of 880 hectopascals (26 inHg). Mahina ranks among the most intense cyclones ever observed in the Southern Hemisphere and almost certainly as the most intense cyclone ever observed off the Eastern states of Australia in recorded history. Clement Lindley Wragge, Government Meteorologist for Queensland, pioneered the naming of such storms and gave this storm its name, Mahina.

Storms of such intensity occur extremely rarely. Scientists identified two other Category 4 or 5 super-cyclones that struck Australia, in the first half of the 19th century, from their effects on the Great Barrier Reef and the Gulf of Carpentaria. This same research shows that on average, such super-cyclones occur in the region only once every two or three centuries.

A pearling fleet, based at Thursday Island, Queensland, was anchored in or near the bay before the storm. Within an hour, the storm drove much of the fleet ashore or onto the Great Barrier Reef; other vessels sank at their anchorages. Four schooners and the manned Channel Rock lightship were lost. A further two schooners were wrecked but later re-floated. The fleets lost 54 luggers, and a further 12 were wrecked but re-floated. People later rescued more than 30 survivors of the wrecked vessels from the shore; however, the storm killed more than 400 people, mostly non-European immigrant crew members. A depiction of the schooner Crest of the Wave in the storm was later sketched in a painting.

A large storm surge, reportedly 13 metres (43 ft) high, swept across Princess Charlotte Bay and then inland about 5 kilometres (3.1 mi), destroying anything left of the Bathurst Bay pearling fleet and the settlement.

An eyewitness, constable J. M. Kenny, reported that a 48-foot (15 m) storm surge swept over their camp at Barrow Point atop a 40-foot (12 m)-high ridge and reached 3 miles (4.8 km) inland, the largest storm surge ever recorded. However, reviewing the evidence for this surge, some scientists modeled a surge only 2 metres (6 ft 7 in) to 3 metres (9.8 ft) in height, based on the official 914-hectopascal (27.0 inHg) central pressure. They also surveyed the area, seeking wave-cut escarpments and deposits characteristic of storm events, but found none higher than 5 metres (16 ft). Of the 48-foot (15 m) surge, they suggested an incorrectly cited ground level or an involvement of freshwater (rain) flooding. A later study considers this conclusion likely premature and questions the barometer reading as unreliable and not representative of the actual lowest pressure. This subsequent study also examined new evidence of exceptionally high storm surge and inundation.

The cyclone continued southwest over Cape York Peninsula, emerging over the Gulf of Carpentaria, before doubling back and dissipating on 10 March.

== Casualties ==
The exact number of casualties is not known, as many deaths were not recorded. Estimates range between 307 and 410.

In September 1899, the Queensland Marine Department published a list of 247 known fatalities. The Queensland Registry of Births, Deaths and Marriages has 283 registered deaths attributed to the cyclone, including 250 on pearling ships. One of the pearling fleet owners estimated another 30 people not officially registered as crew were killed and not reported to the Cooktown Registrar. Eleven crew members of the ship Sagitta were killed.

Around 100 Aboriginal Australians were killed but not recorded, as Aboriginal people were not counted as part of the population at the time. They had tried to help shipwrecked men, but the back surge caught them and swept them into the sea. Only eight Aboriginal people were recorded among the casualties, all of whom died on shore.

The Queensland Historical Atlas reported the death toll as "307 pearl divers and sailors and an unreported number of Aborigines".

== Aftermath ==
People found thousands of fish and some sharks and dolphins several kilometres (miles) inland, and the storm embedded rocks into trees and bushes. On Flinders Island (Queensland), people found dolphins on the 15.2-metre (50 ft) cliffs; however, this finding does not necessarily indicate a surge of this height; on this exposed site, wave run-up readily can produce these results even within the more modest calculated surge.

At Cape Melville, survivors erected a memorial stone to "The Pearlers" lost to the cyclone, naming 11 Europeans but only citing "over 300 coloured men" for the other seamen. The Anglican church on Thursday Island, Queensland, also commemorates this disaster.

== Barometric pressure estimates ==
Most intense Australian cyclones
Rank	Cyclone	Year	Min. pressure
1	Gwenda	1999	900 hPa (26.58 inHg)
1	Inigo	2003	900 hPa (26.58 inHg)
3	George	2007	902 hPa (26.64 inHg)
4	Orson	1989	904 hPa (26.70 inHg)
5	Marcus	2018	905 hPa (26.72 inHg)
6	Theodore	1994	910 hPa (26.87 inHg)
6	Vance	1999	910 hPa (26.87 inHg)
6	Fay	2004	910 hPa (26.87 inHg)
6	Glenda	2006	910 hPa (26.87 inHg)
10	Mahina	1899	914 hPa (26.99 inHg) (Note: Currently, the World Meteorological Organization recognises the lowest pressure of Cyclone Mahina as 27 inches of mercury (914 hPa) based on an observation from the time. A 2014 reconstruction project of Cyclone Mahina by the American Meteorological Society concluded that the 13 metre storm surge produced by the cyclone likely produced barometric pressure levels as low as 880 hPa, which would place it as the strongest tropical cyclone in the Southern Hemisphere, but the metric is not yet approved by the WMO.)
Source: Australian Bureau of Meteorology

Contemporary reports vary considerably in the reported lowest barometric pressures. The pressure recorded on the schooner Olive reasonably consistently show her lowest pressure recorded: 29.60 to 29.10 inches of mercury (1,000 to 985 hPa) or between 29.00 and 29.10 inches of mercury (982 and 985 hPa). In a further variant, "during the lull in the hurricane, the barometer on the Olive recorded" 29.70 to 29.10 inches of mercury (1,010 to 985 hPa).

Most sources record the schooner Crest of the Wave observation as 27 inches of mercury (914 hPa). More modern reports of an 18 inches of mercury (610 hPa) observation on a vessel in the eye of Mahina are unrealistic (the most intense tropical cyclone, Typhoon Tip, had a central pressure 260 hectopascals (7.68 inHg) higher).

One author accepted the 29.1 inches of mercury (985 hPa) report from the Olive and the 27 inches of mercury (914 hPa) report from the Crest of the Wave, seemingly unaware of the discrepant reports. He estimated the track of the cyclone from the damage reports, placing it directly over the position of the Crest of the Wave. The Olive to the north missed the centre. The separation between these schooners explains the difference between their respective pressure measurements. He calculated the centre pressure, standardised for temperature, as 914 hectopascals (13.26 psi).

A study in 2014 found that the actual lowest pressure of the storm was around 880 hectopascals (26 inHg), based upon modeling of meteorological variables needed to induce the potentially world-record-setting surge height of 13 metres (43 ft). This surge closely matches new evidence on storm depositions and accounts actually reported to two other captains, and in a letter from an eyewitness to his parents, of a reading of 26 inches of mercury (880 hPa). This study considers the apparently third-hand report of 27 inches of mercury (914 hPa) an unreliable measurement made possibly five hours prior to passage of the eye.

In comparison, the tiny Cyclone Tracy devastated Darwin in 1974, with a central pressure of 950 hectopascals (28 inHg). Barometric pressure this low at mean sea level also likely caused Cyclone Mahina to create such an intense, phenomenal, claimed world-record storm surge that was not immediately known afterward.

== Popular culture ==
In 2008, Ian Townsend published The Devil's Eye: a novel as a historical fiction novel based on Cyclone Mahina. The novel was developed as part of his research fellowship at the State Library of Queensland.

== See also ==
- List of disasters in Australia by death toll
- List of tropical cyclone records
- 1899 Queensland colonial election, which occurred during the same month
- 1970 Bhola cyclone – The deadliest tropical cyclone worldwide, on record
- 1973 Flores cyclone – The deadliest tropical cyclone recorded in the Southern Hemisphere
- List of Queensland tropical cyclones
