= Maclear Island =

Island in Queensland, Australia

- Interactive map of Maclear Island

Geography
- Location: Northern Australia
- Coordinates: 14.210°S 144.250°E
- Area: 0.08 km^{2} (0.031 sq mi)

Administration
- Australia
- State: Queensland

Maclear Island is part of the Great Barrier Reef Marine Park at the tip of Cape Melville, Queensland in Bathurst Bay.

It is north of Denham Island in the Flinders Group National Park and south of Flinders Island, at Latitude -14.210 and Longitude 144.250.

It is named after John Maclear.
