= Acacia racospermoides =

Scientific classification
- Kingdom: Plantae
- Clade: Tracheophytes
- Clade: Angiosperms
- Clade: Eudicots
- Clade: Rosids
- Order: Fabales
- Family: Fabaceae
- Subfamily: Caesalpinioideae
- Clade: Mimosoid clade
- Genus: Acacia
- Species: A. racospermoides

Binomial name
- Acacia racospermoides Pedley
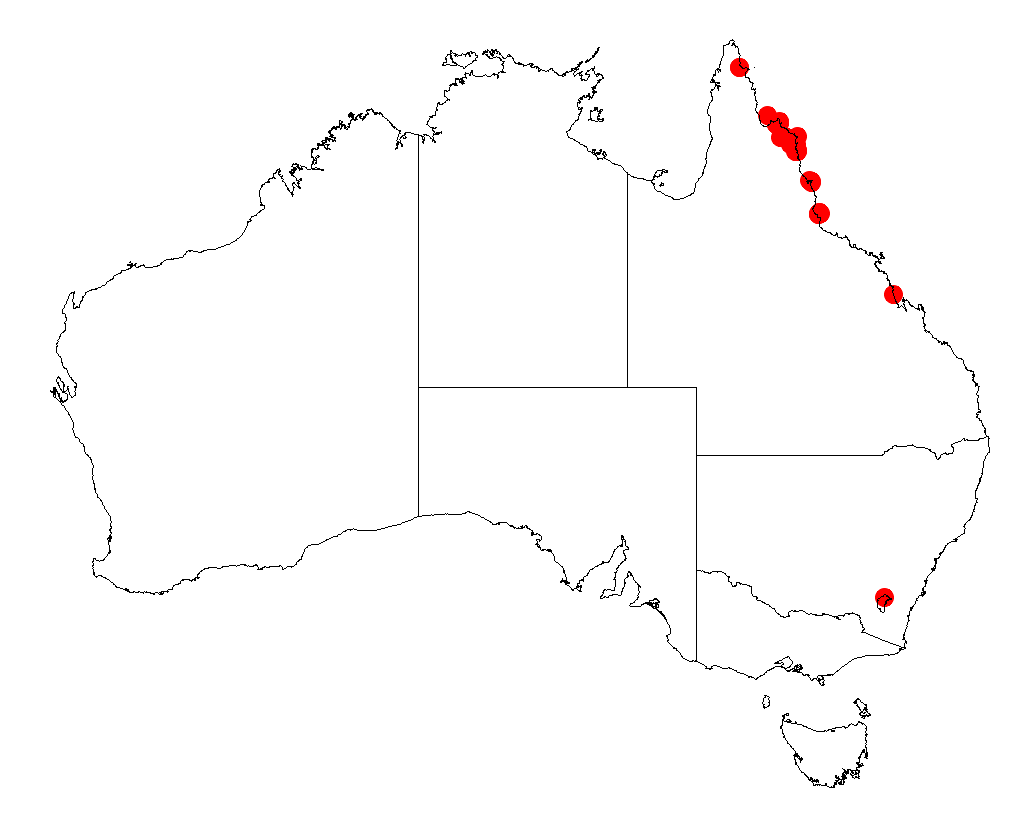
- Occurrence data from AVH

Species of legume

Acacia racospermoides is a shrub or tree of the genus Acacia and the subgenus Plurinerves that is endemic to an area of northeastern Australia.

== Description ==
The shrub or tree that typically grows to a height of 2 to 6 m (6 ft 7 in to 19 ft 8 in) with a spindly or slender habit with white coloured bark and angular glabrous covered in a fine white powdery coating. Like most species of Acacia it has phyllodes rather than true leaves. The thinly leathery and evergreen phyllodes have a narrowly oblong-elliptic shape and are shallowly to moderately sickle shaped with a length of 5 to 15 cm (2.0 to 5.9 in) in length and 1 to 2.5 cm (0.39 to 0.98 in) wide with three prominent main longitudinal nerves.

== Taxonomy ==
The species was first formally described as Acacia racospermoides by the botanist Leslie Pedley in 1990 as a part of the work New combinations in Acacia Miller (Leguminosae: Mimosoideae) as published in the journal Austrobaileya. It was originally described in 1987 by Pedley as Racosperma paniculatum before being transferred to the Acacia genus.

== Distribution ==
It is native to coastal areas in north eastern Queensland where it has a scattered distribution from around Bathurst Bay in the north down to around Cooktown in the south with other outlying populations around Cairns and on Hinchinbrook Island. It is found growing in sandy soils as a part of open forest and heathland communities.

== See also ==
- List of Acacia species
