= Boulder frog =

Boulder frog may refer to:

- Black Mountain boulder frog (Cophixalus saxatilis), a frog in the family Microhylidae endemic to Australia, now severely reduced to the "Black Mountains" 25 km south-west of Cooktown, Queensland
- Blotched boulder-frog (Cophixalus petrophilus), a frog in the family Microhylidae from the Cape York Peninsula, Queensland, Australia
