= Princess Charlotte Bay =

Bay in Queensland, Australia

Coordinates: 14°25′S 144°00′E

Princess Charlotte
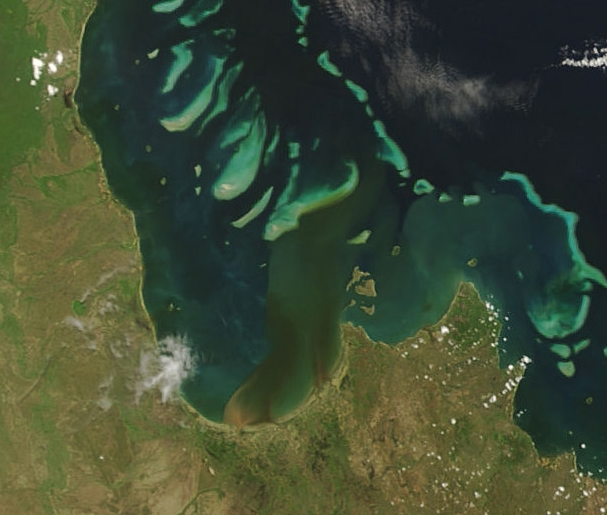
- 2007 image from NASA's Terra satellite showing plumes of sediment flowing into the bay

Location
- Country: Australia
- State: Queensland
- Region: Far North Queensland
- District: Shire of Cook

Physical characteristics
- Length: 61 km (38 mi)

Basin features
- Tributaries
  - left: Normanby River, Bizant River, North Kennedy River, Marrett River

Princess Charlotte Bay is a large bay on the east coast of Far North Queensland at the base of Cape York Peninsula, 350 km north northwest of Cairns. Princess Charlotte Bay is a part of the Great Barrier Reef Marine Park and it is a habitat for the dugong.

Reefs in the bay are described as pristine. Barramundi habitat and associated wetlands exist in declared green zones which restrict commercial fishing.

== History ==
The bay is in the traditional lands of the Bakanambia and Jeteneru people. The bay was named after Princess Charlotte of Wales by Lieutenant Charles Jeffreys of the British Royal Navy in 1815.

Princess Charlotte Bay and surrounds were devastated by the Mahina Cyclone of 1899 which destroyed all 100 ships moored there at the time. Other estimates suggest a lower figure of 82 boats destroyed. On the 4 March 1899, the entire North Queensland pearling fleet was in the bay where they regularly collected supplies and unloaded shells. Around 100 Aboriginals who were assisting survivors ashore and 307 men from the pearling fleet were drowned in Queensland's worst maritime disaster.

== Geography ==
The most easterly point of the bay is Cape Melville. Also in this area is Flinders Island, part of the Flinders Group. The bay's most westerly point is Claremont Point.

Map of Princess Charlotte Bay

Normanby, Bizant, North Kennedy, Marrett and Morehead rivers terminate in the bay. Marine fossils and old beach ridges have been discovered well inland along the river systems. This indicates the bay has been experiencing a gradual infilling.

During spring tides salt water inundates low areas for several kilometres inland. Mixed mangrove forests predominate in tidal areas. The adjacent wetlands are one of the largest in Australia. Extensive areas of seagrass beds exist on the bay's seafloor. There are also large areas of tidal flats covered in sand and mud.

Protected areas around the bay include Marpa National Park, Rinyirru National Park and Cape Melville National Park. The best boat access to Princess Charlotte Bay is from the Bizant boat ramp which is 20 km from Bizant.

== Fauna ==
The Bizant river shark is a rare species of fresh or brackish water shark. More common marine species found in the bay include barramundi, blue salmon, grey mackerel, queenfish, grunter, mangrove jack, tiger prawn and mud crab.

Both Princess Charlotte and nearby Bathurst Bay have some of the highest densities of dugong in Queensland. A Special Management area has been established in Princess Charlotte Bay. It aims to protect the dugong from commercial net fishers by limiting the number of fishing permit holders.

== See also ==
- Geography of Queensland
