= Simpson Rocks =

Rocks

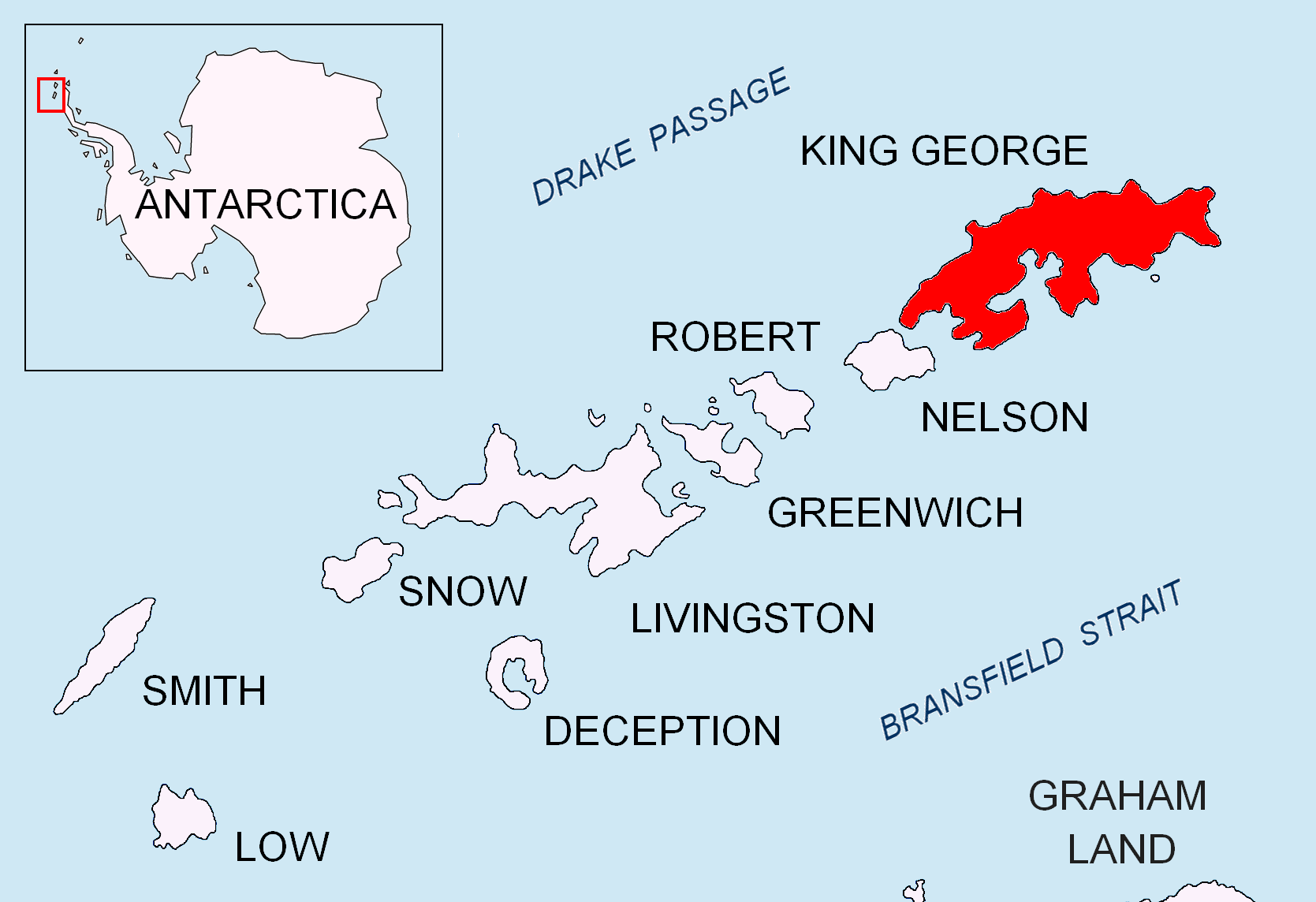
Location of King George Island in the South Shetland Islands.

Simpson Rocks (61°58′S 57°23′W) is a group consisting of a rock, 10 m high, surrounded by sunken rocks, lying 5 nautical miles (9 km) northeast of Cape Melville, King George Island, in the South Shetland Islands. The name "Simpsons Islands" appears on a chart of 1825 by British sealer James Weddell, but the term "rocks" is considered more descriptive than "islands".
