= Colony of Queensland =

British crown colony (1859–1901)

- Crown colony of British Empire
- 1859–1901
- Flag Coat of arms

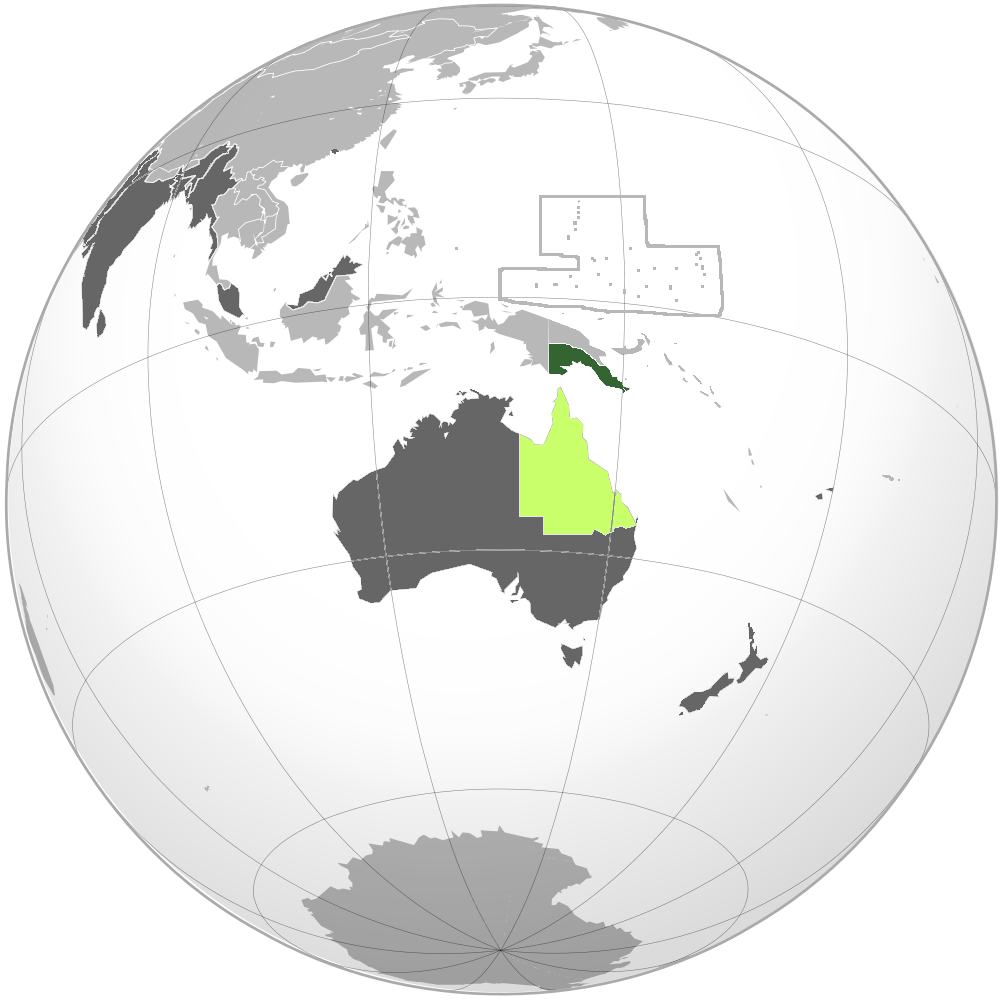
- Light green: Queensland Green: Territory of Papua (annexed by Queensland in 1883) Dark grey: Other British possessions

Anthem
- "God Save the Queen"
- Capital: Brisbane
- Demonym: Queenslanders, Territorians (Note: For people in British New Guinea.)
- Government
  - Type: Self-governing colony
- Monarch
  - 1837–1901: Victoria
- Governor
  - 1859–1868 (first): Sir George Bowen
  - 1896–1901 (last): The Lord Lamington
- Legislature: Parliament
  - Upper house: Legislative Council
  - Lower house: Legislative Assembly
- History
  - Separation of Queensland: 6 June 1859
  - Federation of Australia: 1 January 1901
Preceded by	Succeeded by
Colony of New South Wales	Queensland; British New Guinea
- Today part of: Queensland; Papua New Guinea

The Colony of Queensland was a self-governing Crown colony within the British Empire that existed from 1859 until 1901. Queensland separated from New South Wales on 6 June 1859, and on 1 January 1901, it federated to become a state of the Commonwealth of Australia. At its greatest extent, the colony included the present-day State of Queensland, the Territory of Papua and the Coral Sea Islands Territory.

== History ==
=== Nineteenth century ===
In 1823, John Oxley sailed north from Sydney to inspect Port Curtis (now Gladstone) and Moreton Bay as possible sites for a penal colony. At Moreton Bay, he found the Brisbane River whose existence Cook had predicted, and proceeded to explore the lower part of it. In September 1824, he returned with soldiers and established a temporary settlement on the Redcliffe Peninsula. On 2 December 1824, the Moreton Bay penal settlement was transferred to the Brisbane River where the Central Business District (CBD) of Brisbane now stands. The name Brisbane Town was in use for the settlement since at least November 1828.

Major Edmund Lockyer discovered outcrops of coal along the banks of the upper Brisbane River in 1825.

In 1839, transportation of convicts ceased, culminating in the closure of the Brisbane penal settlement. In 1842, free settlement was permitted. In the same year Andrew Petrie reported favourable grazing conditions and decent forests to the north of Brisbane, which led shortly to the arrival of settlers to Fraser Island and the Cooloola coast region.

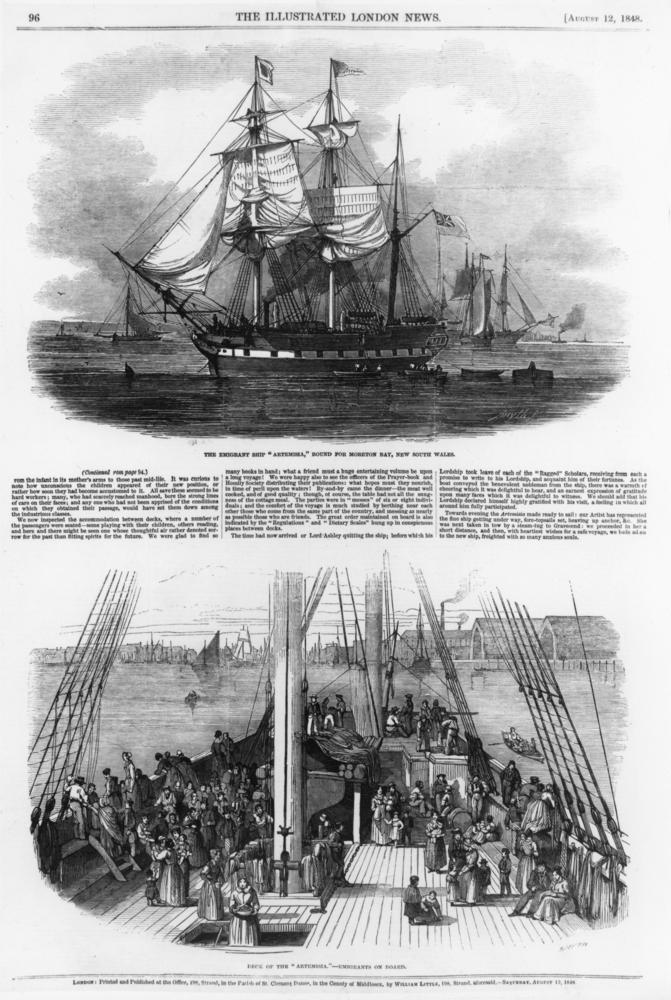
Immigrants aboard the Artemisia arrived at the colony of Moreton Bay in 1848.

In 1847, the Port of Maryborough was opened as a wool port.

The first immigrant ship to arrive in Moreton Bay was the Artemisia in 1848.

In 1857, Queensland's first lighthouse was built at Cape Moreton.

=== Frontier war ===
Fighting between Aboriginal people and settlers in colonial Queensland was more bloody than in any other colonial state in Australia, perhaps partly due to Queensland having a larger pre-contact indigenous population than any other colony in Australia, accounting for over one third, and in some estimates close to forty percent, of the entire pre-contact population of the continent. It is estimated that some 1,500 European settlers, including women and children – and their Chinese, Aboriginal, and Melanesian allies – died in frontier skirmishes with Aboriginals in Queensland during the nineteenth century. The casualties among the Aboriginal fighters suffered in these battles with settlers and native police (frequently described by contemporary political leaders and newspapers as "warfare", "a kind of warfare", "guerrilla-like warfare", and at times as a "war of extermination") is estimated to have exceeded 30,000. Others have suggested there were more Aboriginal casualties. The "Native Police Force" (sometimes "Native Mounted Police Force"), recruited and deployed by the Queensland government, was a key unit in the war between the new arrivals and the aboriginal fighters.

The three largest battles between new arrivals and Aborigines in Australian colonial history all took place in Queensland. On 27 October 1857 Martha Fraser's Hornet Bank station on the Dawson River, in central Queensland took the lives of 11 Europeans. The tent camp of the embryo station of Cullin-La-Ringo near Springsure was attacked by Aborigines on 17 October 1861, killing 19 people including the grazier Horatio Wills. Following the wreck of the brig Maria at Bramble Reef near the Whitsunday Islands, on 26 February a total of 14 European survivors were massacred by local Aborigines. The Battle of One Tree Hill also took place in the 1840s.

=== Colony of Queensland ===
In 1851, a public meeting was held to consider Queensland's separation from New South Wales. On 6 June 1859, Queen Victoria signed Letters Patent to form the colony of Queensland. A proclamation was read by George Bowen on 10 December 1859 whereupon Queensland was formally separated from New South Wales. Bowen became the first Governor of Queensland and Robert Herbert became the first Premier of Queensland.

Queensland was the only Australian colony that commenced immediately with its own parliament, instead of first spending time as a Crown Colony (i.e. having a Governor appointed by The Crown). By this time, Western Australia was the only Australian colony without a responsible government. Ipswich and Rockhampton became towns in 1860, with Maryborough and Warwick becoming towns the following year.

In 1861, rescue parties for Burke and Wills, which failed to find them, did some exploratory work of their own, in central and north-western Queensland. Notably among these was Frederick Walker who originally worked for the native police. Brisbane was linked by electric telegraph to Sydney in 1861; however, the first operating telegraph line in Queensland was from Brisbane to Ipswich in the same year.

==== Gold rush ====
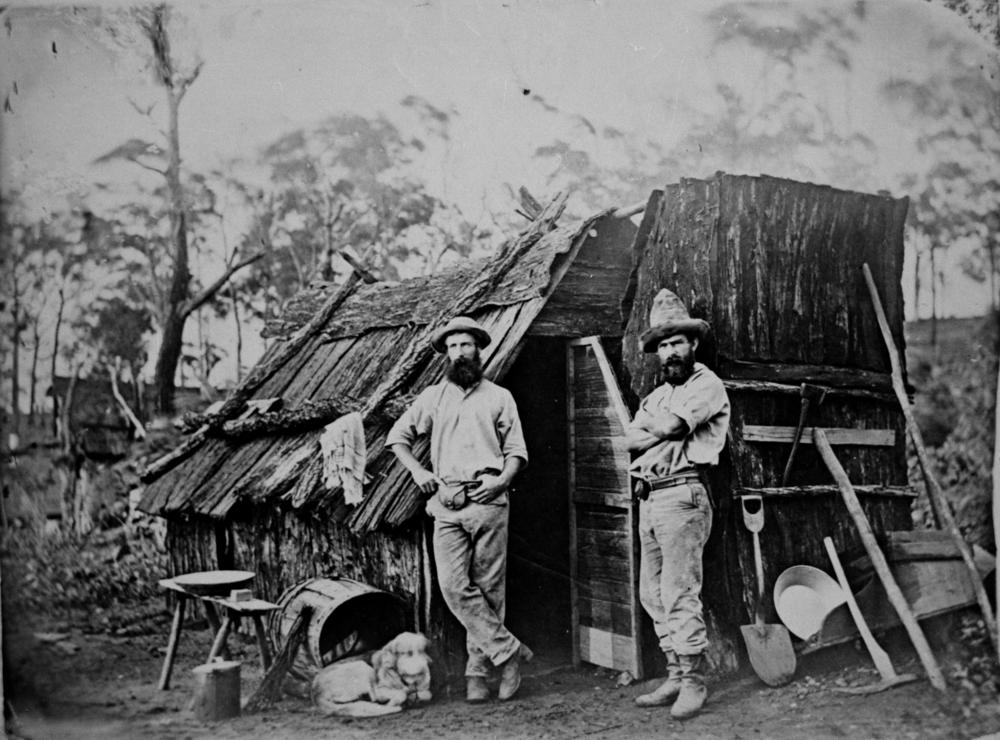
Early gold miners were prepared to live rough to strike it rich.

Although smaller than the gold rushes of Victoria and New South Wales, Queensland had its own series of gold rushes in the later half of the nineteenth century. In 1858, gold was discovered at Canoona, causing the short-lived Canoona gold rush. In 1867, gold was discovered in Gympie. Richard Daintree's explorations in North Queensland lead to several goldfields being developed in the late 1860s. In 1872, William Hann discovered gold on the Palmer River, southwest of Cooktown. Chinese settlers began to arrive in the goldfields, by 1877 there were 17,000 Chinese on Queensland gold fields. In that year restrictions on Chinese immigration were passed.

=== Other events ===
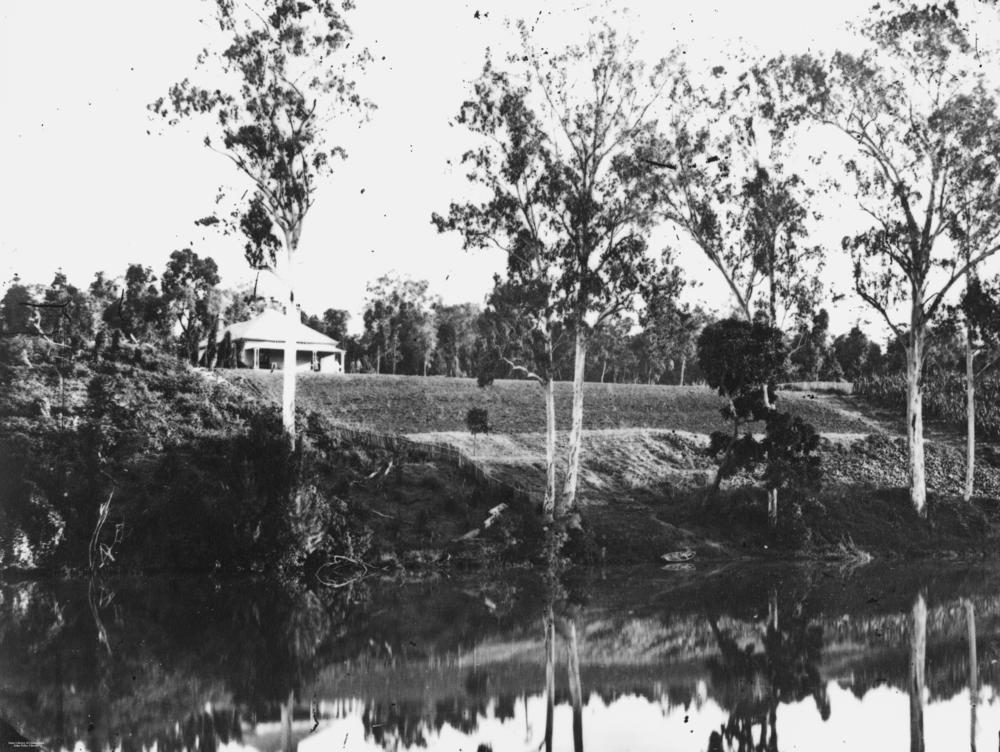
Mary River residence, 1870

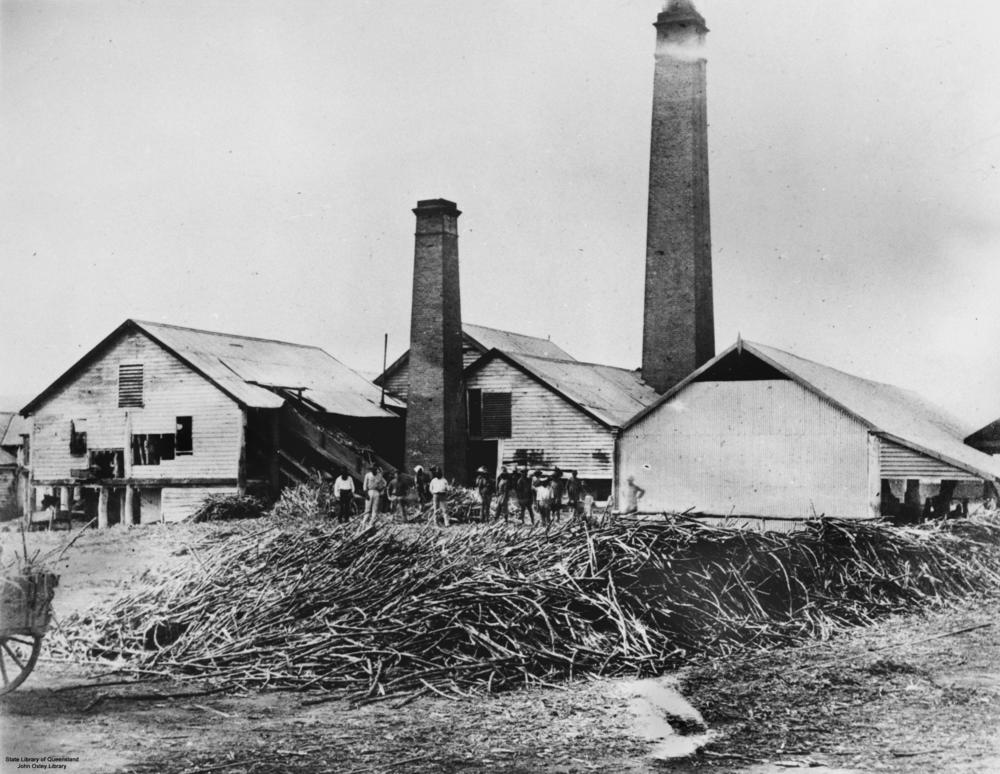
Pioneer Sugar Mill at Mackay in the 1880s

1862 saw Queensland's western boundary changed from longitude 141° E to 138°E. In 1863, the first Chief Justice, Sir James Cockle was appointed. 1864 was an annus horribilis for Queensland. In March of that year, major flooding of the Brisbane River inundated the centre of town, in April, fires devastated the west side of Queen Street, which was the main shopping district and in December, another fire, which was Brisbane's worst ever, wiped out the rest of Queen Street and adjoining streets.

1865 saw the first steam trains in Queensland, travelling (from Ipswich to Bigge's Camp, which is now known as Grandchester). Townsville gazetted as a town in the same year. In 1867, the Queensland Constitution was consolidated from existing legislation under the Constitution Act 1867. Sugar production was by then becoming a major industry. In 1867, six mills produced 168 tons of cane sugar, by 1870 there were 28 mills with a production of 2,854 tons. The production of sugar started around Brisbane, but spread to Mackay and Cairns, and by 1888 the annual output of sugar was 60,000 tons. 1871 saw George Phipps, 2nd Marquess of Normanby become the Governor of Queensland. The first record of a rugby match played in Queensland occurred in 1876. In 1877, Arthur Edward Kennedy became the Governor of Queensland. The first meat processed in the state occurred at Queensport along the Brisbane River in 1881.

In 1883, Queensland Premier Sir Thomas McIlwraith annexed Papua (later repudiated by British government). On 2 June the decision to form a rugby union association was made at the Exchange hotel in Brisbane. The same year Queensland's population passed the 250,000 mark. In 1887, the Brisbane-Wallangarra railway line was opened, and in 1888 there was a 483-mile (777 km) line opened between Brisbane and Charleville. There were other lines that were nearly complete from Rockhampton to Longreach, and others being constructed around Maryborough, Mackay, and Townsville. By 1888, there were more than 5 million cattle in Queensland.

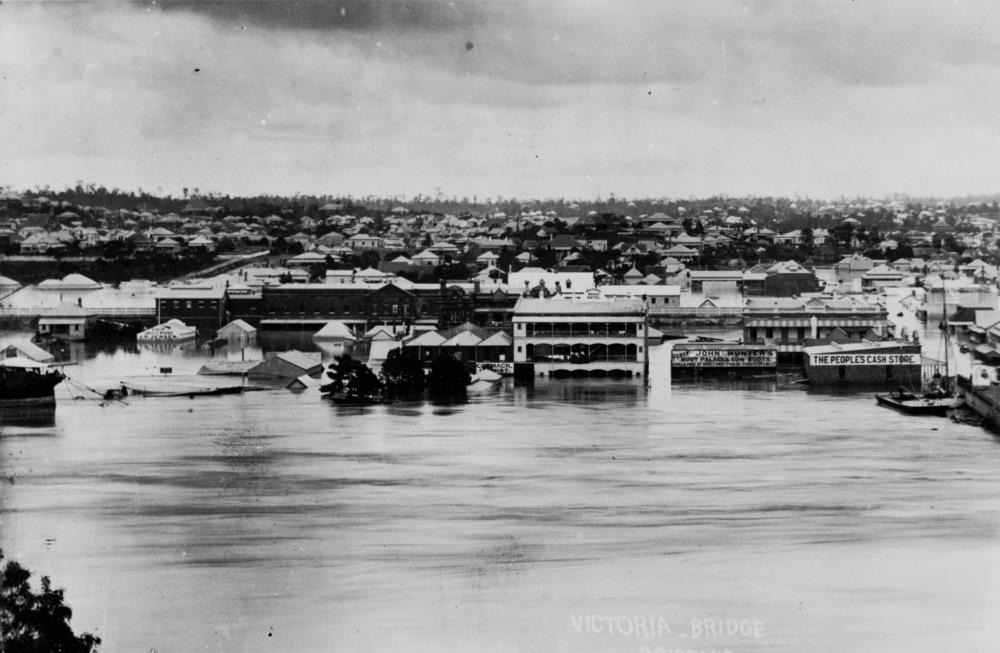
South Brisbane during the 1893 Brisbane flood

1891 saw the Great Shearers' Strike at Barcaldine leads to formation of the Australian Labor Party. The issue in the strike was whether employers were entitled to use non-union labour. There were troops and police called in, some sheds were fired, and there were mass riots. There was a second shearers strike in 1894. Union sponsored candidates won sixteen seats at the Queensland elections in 1893. The 1893 Brisbane flood caused much destruction including destroying the Victoria Bridge. The land where the Brisbane Cricket Ground now sits was first used as a cricket ground in 1895, with the first cricket match played there in December 1896. In 1897, Native (Aboriginal) Police force disbanded.

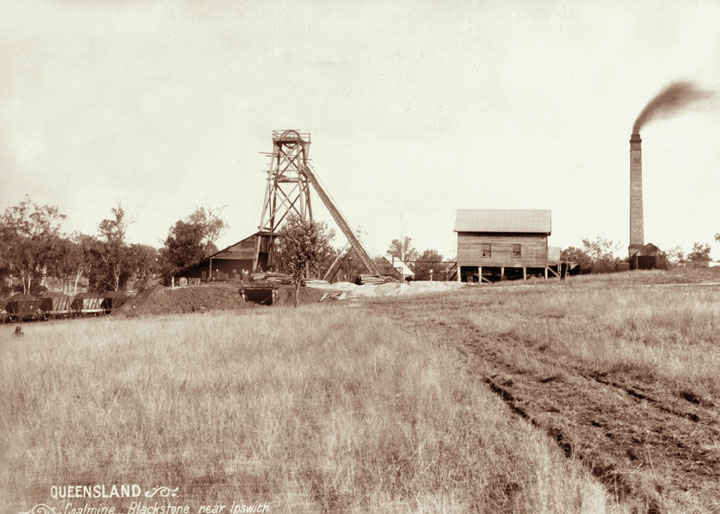
Coal mine in Ipswich, 1898

In 1899, the world's first Labor Party Government, with Premier Anderson Dawson as the leader, was elected into power only to last one week. In July 1899 Queensland offered to send a force of 250 mounted infantry to help Britain in the Second Boer War (Second Anglo-Boer War). Also in that year, gold production at Charters Towers peaked. The first natural gas find in Queensland and Australia was at Roma in 1900 as a team was drilling a water well. The Mahina Cyclone of 1899 struck Cape York Peninsula, destroying a pearling fleet in Princess Charlotte Bay. The cyclone claimed the lives of around 400 people, making it Queensland's worst maritime disaster.

==== Immigration ====
During the 1890s many workers known as the Kanakas were brought to Queensland from neighbouring Pacific Island nations to work in the sugar cane fields. Some of whom had been kidnapped under a process known as Blackbirding. When Australia was federated in 1901, the White Australia policy came into effect, whereby all foreign workers in Australia were deported under the Pacific Island Labourers Act 1901. At this time between 7,000 and 10,000 Pacific Islanders were living in Queensland. Most of them had been deported by 1908, by which time there were only 1,500–2,500 remaining.

=== Exploration ===
In 1606, the Dutch navigator Willem Janszoon landed near the site of the modern-day town of Weipa on the western shore of Cape York. His arrival was the first recorded encounter between European and Australian Aboriginal people.

In 1614, Luis Váez de Torres, a Spanish explorer may have sighted the Queensland coast at the tip of Cape York. In that year, he had sailed the Torres Strait, the body of water now named after him.

In 1768, the French explorer Louis Antoine de Bougainville sailed west from the New Hebrides islands, getting to within a hundred miles of the Queensland coast. He did not reach the coast because he did not find a passage through the coral reefs, and turned back.

Lieutenant James Cook wrote that he claimed the east coast for King George III of Great Britain on 22 August 1770 when standing on Possession Island off the west coast of Cape York Peninsula, naming eastern Australia "New South Wales". This included the present Queensland. Cook charted the Australian east coast in his ship HM Barque "Endeavour", naming Stradbroke and Morton (now Moreton Island) islands, the Glass House Mountains, Double Island Point, Wide Bay, Hervey Bay and the Great Sandy Cape, now called Fraser Island. His second landfall in Australia was at Round Hill Head, 500 km north of Brisbane. The Endeavour was grounded on a coral reef near Cape Tribulation, on 11 June 1770 where he was delayed for almost seven weeks while they repaired the ship. This occurred where Cooktown now lies, on the Endeavour River, both places named after the incident. On 22 August the Endeavour reached the northern tip of Queensland, which Cook named the Cape York Peninsula after the Duke of York.

In 1799, in the Norfolk, Matthew Flinders spent six weeks exploring the Queensland coast as far north as Hervey Bay. In 1802 he explored the coast again. On a later trip to England, his ship HMS Porpoise and the accompanying Cato ran aground on a coral reef off the Queensland coast. Flinders set off for Sydney in an open cutter, at a distance of 750 miles (1,210 km), where the Governor sent ships back to rescue the crew from Wreck Reef.

== See also ==
- Separation of Queensland
- History of Queensland
- History of Brisbane
- Federation of Australia

== Bibliography ==
- Baker, Sidney J. (1945). The Australian Language. Halstead Press Pty Ltd.
