= Marpa National Park =

National park in Queensland, Australia

- IUCN category II (national park)
- Location within Queensland
- Location: Queensland
- Nearest city: Coen
- Coordinates: 14°13′34″S 143°47′35″E
- Area: 0.43 km^{2} (0.17 sq mi)
- Established: 1989
- Governing body: Queensland Parks and Wildlife Service
- Website: Official website

Marpa is a national park at Yarraden on Cape York Peninsula in Far North Queensland, Australia, 1,757 km northwest of Brisbane. It is part of the Great Barrier Reef Marine Park west of Cape Melville in Princess Charlotte Bay. The park is a restricted access area to protect cultural resource of the islands traditional owners, the Lama Lama people.

The national park was formerly known as Cliff Islands National Park. The alteration was part of new process where parks on the Cape York Peninsula are jointly managed between Aboriginal land trusts and the state government under the Cape York Peninsula Heritage Act 2007.

It comprises three small sandstone islands. Ronganhu is positioned to the north, Errewerrpinha in the west and Olilu to the south. The islands have remained in pristine condition. The islands are home to a number of important bird species, including the beach stone-curlew, eastern curlew and sooty oystercatcher. Also seen around the islands are the white-bellied sea-eagle, peregrine falcon and eastern osprey. Fringing reefs and seagrass beds are found in the surrounding waters. Green turtles nest on the beaches.

== Facilities ==
There are no roads, walking tracks or public facilities. Camping is not permitted.

== See also ==
- Protected areas of Queensland
