= Geography of Queensland =

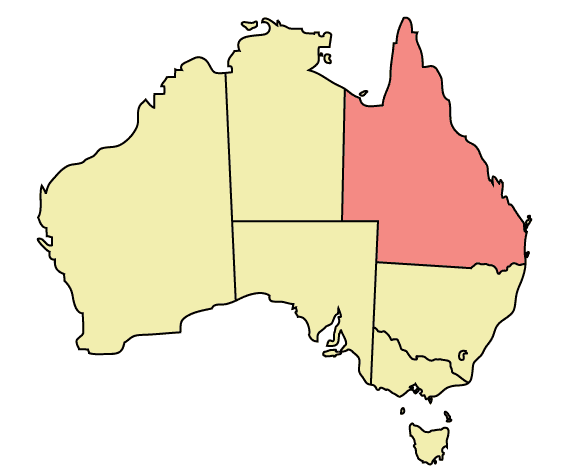
- Continent: Australia
- Coordinates: 23°S 143°E
- Area: Ranked 2nd among states and territories
  - Total: 1,729,742 km^{2} (667,857 sq mi)
- Coastline: 6,973 km (4,333 mi)
- Borders: Land borders: Northern Territory, New South Wales, South Australia
- Highest point: Mount Bartle Frere; 1,622 m (5,322 ft)
- Longest river: Flinders River; 840 km (521 mi)
- Largest lake: Burdekin Dam; 220 km²

The geography of Queensland in the north-east of Australia, is varied. It includes tropical islands, sandy beaches, flat river plains that flood after monsoon rains, tracts of rough, elevated terrain, dry deserts, rich agricultural belts and densely populated urban areas.

The total land mass of Queensland covers 22.5% of the Australian continent, an area of 1,729,742 square kilometres, making it the second largest state in Australia. The total length of Queensland's mainland coastline is 6,973 km (4,333 mi) with another 6,374 km (3,961 mi) of island coastline. A unique geographical feature of the state is the Great Barrier Reef, an important tourist drawcard. The Tropic of Capricorn crosses the state with about half of Queensland's area located to the north of the line.

== Border ==
The far western boundary with the Northern Territory is aligned along the 138th meridian east until Poeppel Corner at the intersection of this meridian and the 26th parallel south. It is here that Queensland borders South Australia. The boundary follows this latitude until it reaches the 141st meridian east Haddon Corner where the border turns south reaching Cameron Corner on the 29th parallel south, the most western part of the border with New South Wales. The border follows this latitude towards the coast at about the 154th meridian east before following the courses of a number of rivers, then across a number of mountain ranges until it reaches Point Danger. These rivers are the Macintyre River, Severn River and Weir Rivers, all tributaries of the Barwon River itself a tributary of the Darling River. Southern border towns include Mungindi, Goondiwindi and Texas.

== Regions ==
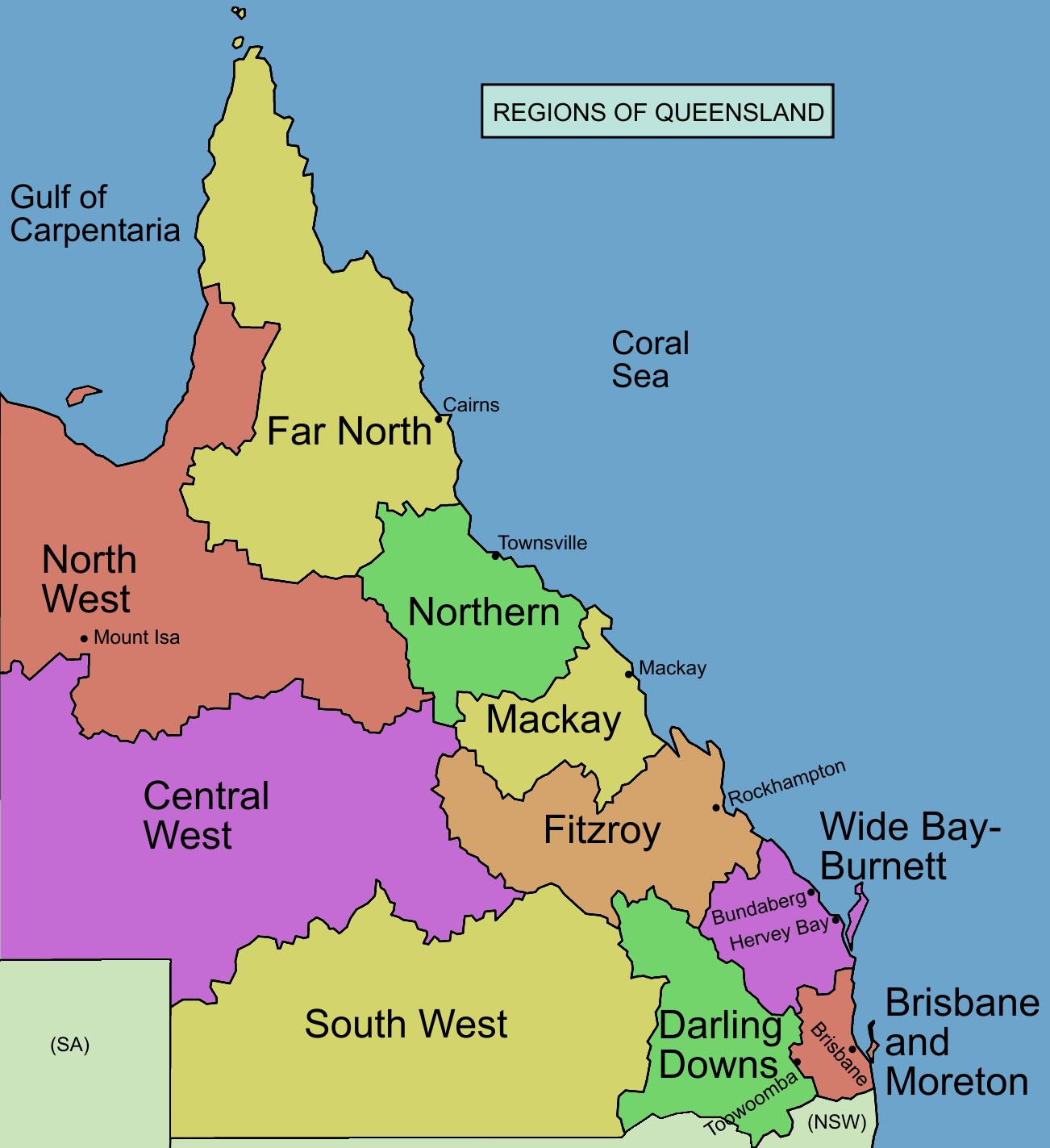
Regions of Queensland

The state is divided into several unofficial regions which are commonly used to refer to large areas of the state's vast geography. These include:

- South East Queensland in the state's coastal extreme south-eastern corner, an urban region which includes the state's three largest cities: capital city Brisbane and popular coastal tourist destinations the Gold Coast and Sunshine Coast. In some definitions, it also includes the city of Toowoomba. South East Queensland accounts for more than 70% of the state's population.
- The Darling Downs in the state's inland south-east, which consists of fertile agricultural (particularly cattle grazing) land and in some definitions includes the city of Toowoomba. The region also includes the mountainous Granite Belt, the state's coldest region which occasionally experiences snow.
- Wide Bay–Burnett in the state's coastal south-east, to the north of the South East Queensland region. It is rich in sugar cane farms and includes the cities of Bundaberg, Hervey Bay as well as K'gari, the world's largest sand island.
- Central Queensland on the state's central coastline, which is dominated by cattle farmland and coal mining. It contains the Capricorn Coast and Whitsunday Islands tourist regions, as well as the cities of Rockhampton and Mackay.
- North Queensland on the state's northern coastline, which is dominated by cattle farmland and mining and which includes the city of Townsville.
- Far North Queensland on the state's extreme northern coastline along the Cape York Peninsula, which includes tropical rainforest, the state's highest mountain, Mount Bartle Frere, the Atherton Tablelands pastoral region (dominated by sugar cane and tropical fruits), the most visited section of the Great Barrier Reef, as well as the city of Cairns.
- South West Queensland in the state's inland south-west, which is a primarily agricultural region dominated by cattle farmland, and which includes the Channel Country region of intertwining rivulets.
- Central West Queensland in the state's inland central-west, dominated by cattle farmland and which includes the city of Longreach.
- North West Queensland, in the state's inland north-west along the Gulf of Carpentaria, which is dominated by savanna and mining and includes the city of Mount Isa.

== Physical geography ==
=== Islands ===
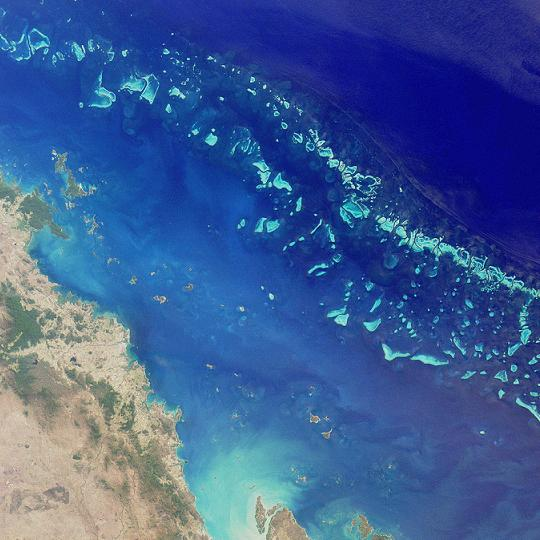
The Great Barrier Reef, with the Whitsunday Islands in the north and Shoalwater Bay in the south

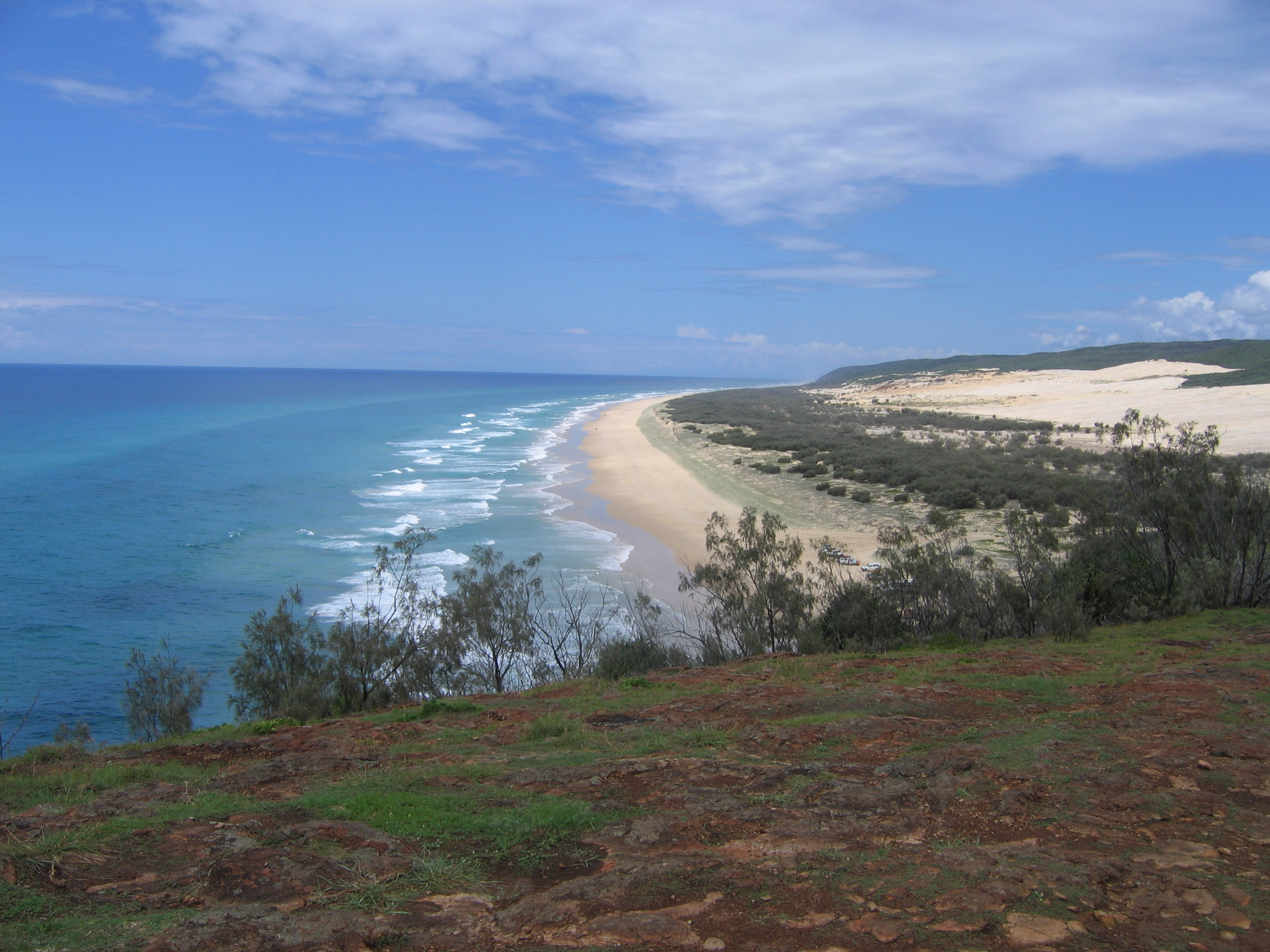
View south from Indian Head, Fraser Island (now K'gari), 2005

K'gari, the largest sand island in the world lies off the coast of Queensland. There are half of the world's perched or dune lakes on K'gari. These rare lakes, which total 80 of this type worldwide, are formed in depressions between sand dunes and have no natural inflow or outflow. Magnetic Island, Heron island, Great Keppel Island, Hamilton Island and the Whitsunday Islands are known for their tourist resorts. Mornington Island and Great Palm Island sustain large aboriginal communities. In the Torres Strait Thursday Island is the administrative and commercial centre of the Torres Strait Islands. Hinchinbrook Island, a large, mountainous island offshore from Cardwell, is completely preserved within the national park. North West Island is a coral cay that sustains important nesting grounds for sea birds and turtles.

The islands of Bribie, Moreton, North Stradbroke and South Stradbroke are located in the south east corner of the state. North Stradbroke Island is the second largest sand island in the world. As Bribie Island is connected by a bridge over the Pumicestone Passage it is the most developed island in the region.

=== Bodies of water ===
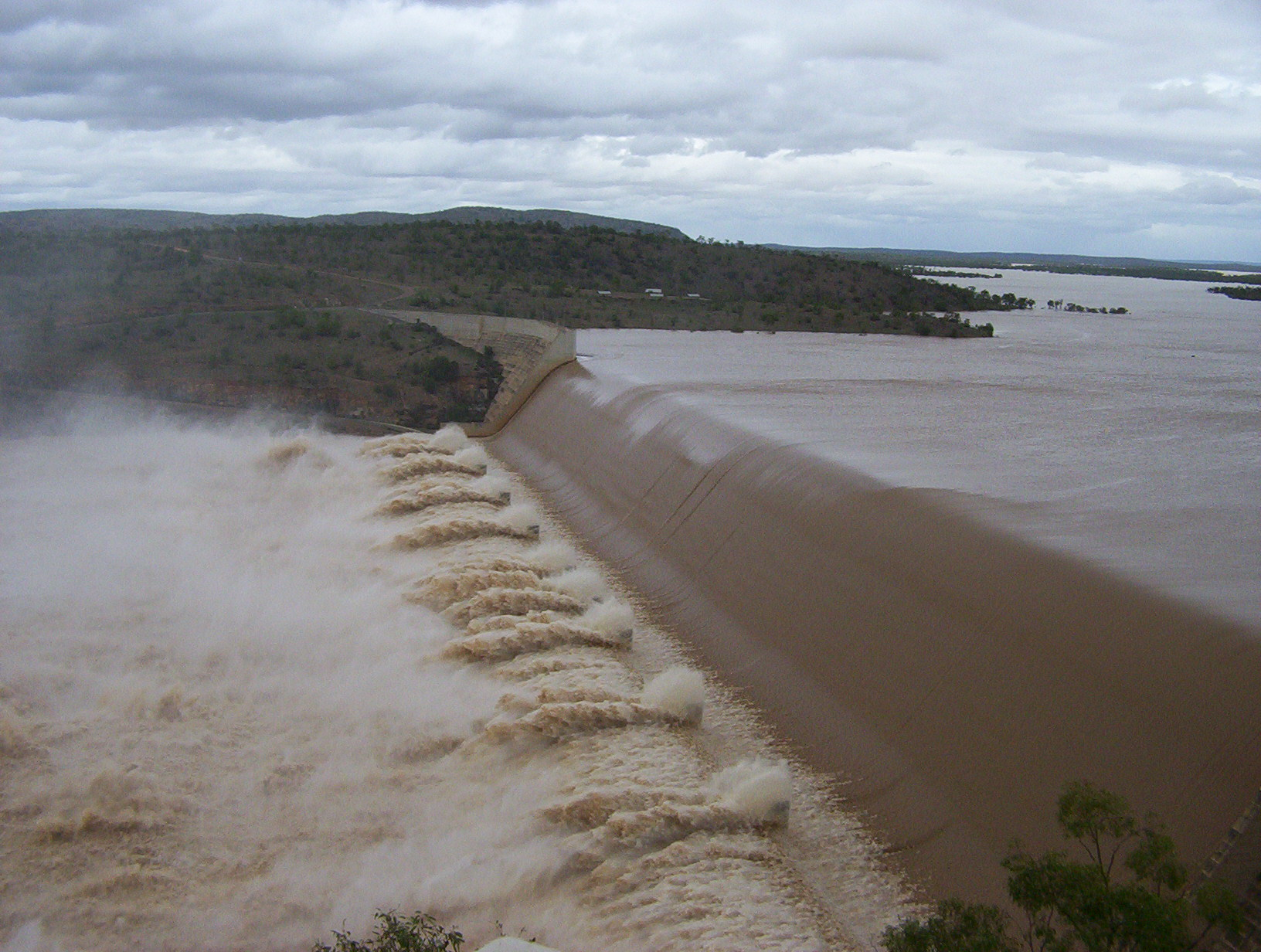
Burdekin Dam is Queensland's largest reservoir, 2007

To the north west of Queensland is the Gulf of Carpentaria. North of Cape York Peninsula is Torres Strait with many Torres Strait Islands, the most northerly of which is Boigu Island at the 10th parallel south. To the east of Queensland lies the Coral Sea, part of the Pacific Ocean. Major bays along the coast include Princess Charlotte Bay, Shoalwater Bay north of Yeppoon, Hervey Bay between K'gari and the mainland, Trinity Bay off Cairns and Moreton Bay off Brisbane. The Great Sandy Strait is a passage extending south of Hervey Bay, between the mainland and K'gari. Beaches on the Gold Coast and the Sunshine Coast are long and sandy, attracting tourists including surfers. Further north the waves are dampened by the barrier reefs.

Queensland's largest dam is the Burdekin Dam, followed by Lake Awoonga. There are no large natural lakes in the state. There are a few natural lakes created by volcanic craters and coastal lagoons mainly in South East Queensland. The lakes in the arid and semi-arid regions of Queensland experience low, highly variable rates of rainfall together with very high evaporation rates.

=== Rivers ===
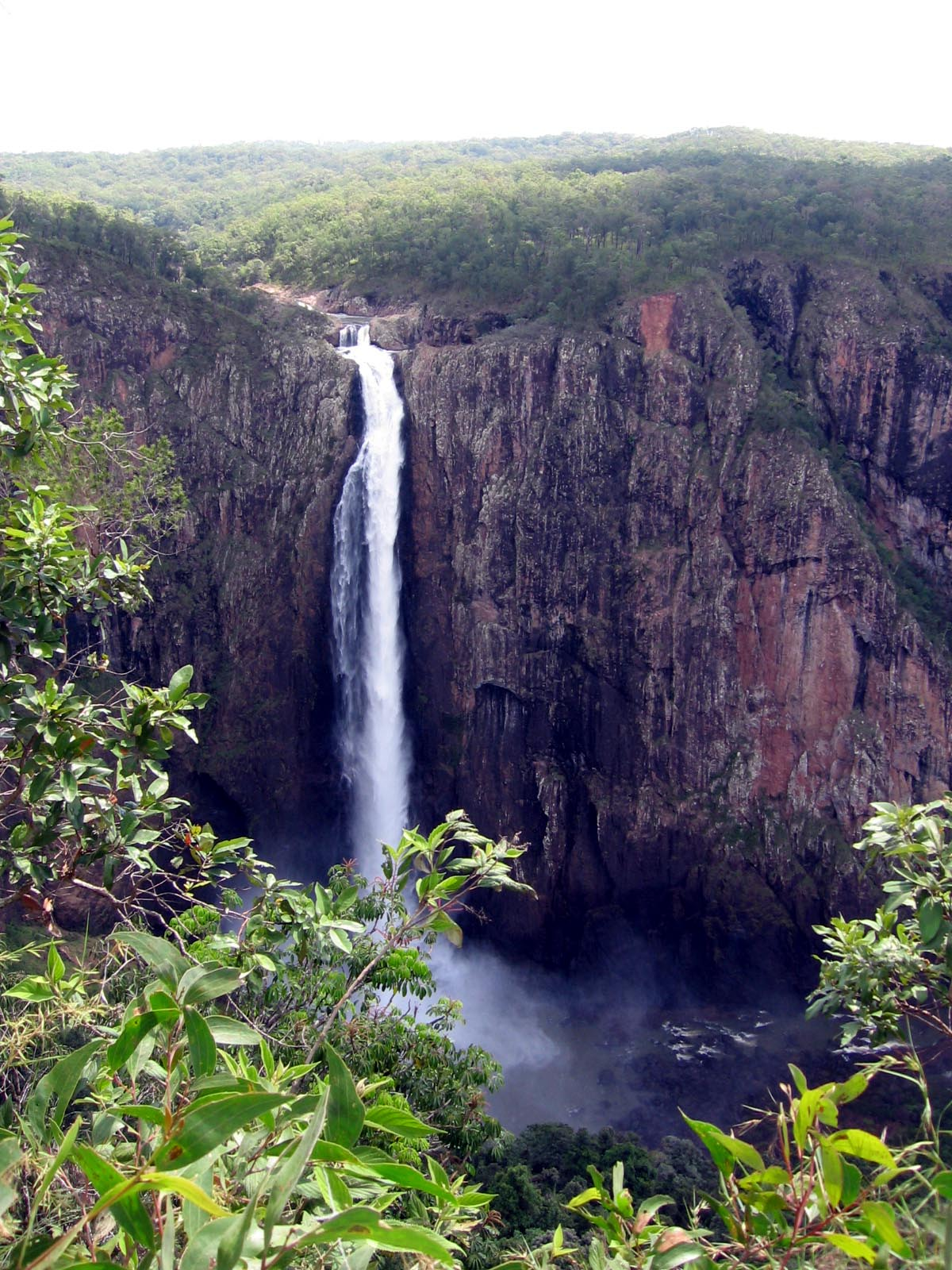
Wallaman Falls has the longest drop of any waterfall in Australia, 2007

Queensland contains hundreds of rivers and many more smaller creeks. The discharge from these rivers, particularly in the tropical north of the state, accounts for 45% of the nation's surface runoff. Major coastal rivers include the Mitchell River, Fitzroy River, Mary River and Brisbane River with the Flinders River being the longest at 840 km (520 mi). Inland are the northern tributaries of the Murry River including the Maranoa River, Warrego River and Condamine River. Rivers of the Lake Eyre Basin include Cooper Creek with its two major tributaries Thomson River and the Barcoo River as well as the Georgina River. The Wenlock River contains the highest diversity of freshwater fish of all Australian rivers.

Barron Falls in the north of the state is one of the most striking. During heavy rains the landscape is transformed into a gushing torrent. Similarly Purlingbrook Falls in the Gold Coast Hinterland is most spectacular after strong downpours. Wallaman Falls west of Ingham in North Queensland is Australia's largest single drop waterfall. Other notable waterfalls include Milla Milla Falls, Purlingbrook Falls and Coomera Falls.

Some of Queensland's towns are located on relatively flat land on the banks of rivers. During severe floods, such as the 2010 Queensland floods, numerous towns are inundated as flood waters rise. Levees have alleviated some minor flooding but after prolonged periods of heavy rainfall the sheer volume of flood waters cannot be held back. Disruptions from flooding have become accepted in inland towns like Charleville and to a lesser degree in coastal towns such as Gympie.

=== Mountains and ranges ===
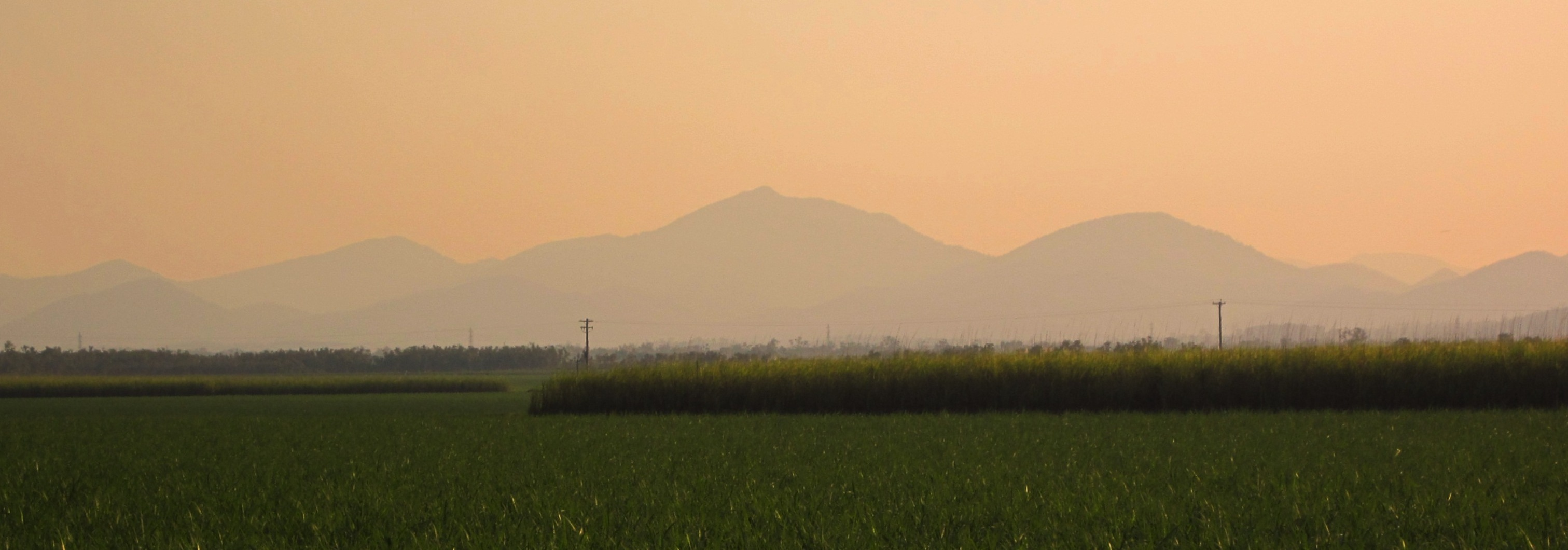
Dittmer Mountain Range, Kelsey Creek

Eastern Queensland is dominated by the Great Dividing Range in contrast to the low-relief of western areas. East of the Great Dividing Range is a narrow coastal strip, known as the Australian north-east coast drainage division which contains most of the state's population. It is along this strip that the state's most important agricultural product, sugar cane, is grown in the fertile soils and moist climate.

Other elevated areas include eastern parts of the Barkly Tableland, Atherton Tablelands, Central Highlands containing Carnarvon Gorge and the Granite Belt, Queensland's primary wine-producing region. The Bunya Mountains an isolated spur of the Great Divide are especially scenic and provide important habitat in a region that has suffered from excess land clearing. Closer to the coast is the Glasshouse Mountains, a series of volcanic plugs which were named by the explorer Captain James Cook. Another natural wonder is the series of mountain ranges in South East Queensland known as the Scenic Rim.

The highest mountains in the state are Mount Bartle Frere at 1,622 m (5,322 ft), Mount Bellenden Ker at 1,593 m (5,226 ft), Mount Superbus at 1,375 m (4,511 ft), at Mount Barney 1,359 m (4,459 ft) and Thornton Peak reaching 1,374 m (4,508 ft) above sea level.

=== Climate ===
Köppen climate types in Queensland

Because of its size, there is significant variation in climate across the state. There is ample rainfall along the coastline, with a monsoonal wet season in the tropical north, and humid sub-tropical conditions along the southern coastline. Low rainfall and hot humid summers are typical for the inland and west. Elevated areas in the south-eastern inland can experience temperatures well below freezing in mid-winter providing frost and, rarely, snowfall. The climate of the coastal regions is influenced by warm ocean waters, keeping the region free from extremes of temperature and providing moisture for rainfall.

There are six predominant climatic zones in Queensland, based on temperature and humidity:

- Hot humid summer, warm humid winter (far north and coastal): Cairns, Innisfail
- Hot humid summer, warm dry winter (north and coastal): Townsville, Mackay
- Hot humid summer, mild dry winter (coastal elevated areas and coastal south-east): Brisbane, Bundaberg, Rockhampton
- Hot dry summer, mild dry winter (central inland and north-west): Mt Isa, Emerald, Longreach
- Hot dry summer, cool dry winter (southern inland): Roma, Charleville, Goondiwindi
- Warm humid summer, cold dry winter (elevated south-eastern areas): Toowoomba, Warwick, Stanthorpe

The annual mean climatic statistics for selected Queensland cities are shown below:

| City | Min. temp | Max. temp | No. clear days | Rainfall |
|---|---|---|---|---|
| Brisbane | 15.7 °C (60.3 °F) | 25.5 °C (77.9 °F) | 113.1 | 1,149.1 mm (45.24 in) |
| Mackay | 19.0 °C (66.2 °F) | 26.4 °C (79.5 °F) | 123.0 | 1,570.7 mm (61.84 in) |
| Cairns | 21.0 °C (69.8 °F) | 29.2 °C (84.6 °F) | 89.7 | 1,982.2 mm (78.04 in) |
| Townsville | 19.8 °C (67.6 °F) | 28.9 °C (84.0 °F) | 120.9 | 1,136.7 mm (44.75 in) |

The coastal far north of the state is the wettest region in Australia, with Mount Bellenden Ker, south of Cairns, holding many Australian rainfall records with its annual average rainfall of over 8 metres. Snow is rare in Queensland, although it does fall with some regularity along the far southern border with New South Wales, predominantly in the Stanthorpe district although on rare occasions further north and west. The most northerly snow ever recorded in Australia occurred near Mackay; however, this was exceptional.

Natural disasters are often a threat in Queensland: severe tropical cyclones can impact the central and northern coastlines and cause severe damage, with recent examples including Larry, Yasi, Ita and Debbie. Flooding from rain-bearing systems can also be severe and can occur anywhere in Queensland. One of the deadliest and most damaging floods in the history of the state occurred in early 2011. Severe springtime thunderstorms generally affect the south-east and inland of the state and can bring damaging winds, torrential rain, large hail and even tornadoes. The strongest tornado ever recorded in Australia occurred in Queensland near Bundaberg. Droughts and bushfires can also occur; however, the latter are generally less severe than those that occur in southern states.

The highest official maximum temperature recorded in the state was 49.5 °C (121.1 °F) at Birdsville Police Station on 24 December 1972, although the Moderate-Resolution Imaging Spectroradiometer (MODIS) on NASA's Aqua satellite measured a ground surface temperature of 69.3 °C (156.7 °F). Queensland has the highest average maximums of any Australian state, and Stanthorpe, Hervey Bay, Mackay, Atherton, Weipa and Thursday Island are the only large population centres not to have recorded a temperature above 40 °C (104 °F). The lowest recorded minimum temperature is −10.6 °C (12.9 °F) at Stanthorpe on 23 June 1961 and at The Hermitage (near Warwick) on 12 July 1965. Temperatures below 0 °C (32 °F) are, however, generally uncommon over the majority of populated Queensland.

Climate data for Queensland
| Month | Jan | Feb | Mar | Apr | May | Jun | Jul | Aug | Sep | Oct | Nov | Dec | Year |
|---|---|---|---|---|---|---|---|---|---|---|---|---|---|
| Record high °C (°F) | 49.0 (120.2) | 47.2 (117.0) | 46.7 (116.1) | 41.7 (107.1) | 39.3 (102.7) | 36.0 (96.8) | 36.1 (97.0) | 38.5 (101.3) | 42.4 (108.3) | 45.1 (113.2) | 48.7 (119.7) | 49.5 (121.1) | 49.5 (121.1) |
| Record low °C (°F) | 5.4 (41.7) | 3.3 (37.9) | −0.2 (31.6) | −3.5 (25.7) | −6.8 (19.8) | −10.6 (12.9) | −10.6 (12.9) | −9.4 (15.1) | −5.6 (21.9) | −3.6 (25.5) | 0.0 (32.0) | 2.2 (36.0) | −10.6 (12.9) |
Source 1: Bureau of Meteorology
Source 2: Bureau of Meteorology

Climate data for Brisbane (Köppen Cwa/Cfa)
| Month | Jan | Feb | Mar | Apr | May | Jun | Jul | Aug | Sep | Oct | Nov | Dec | Year |
|---|---|---|---|---|---|---|---|---|---|---|---|---|---|
| Record high °C (°F) | 40.0 (104.0) | 41.7 (107.1) | 37.9 (100.2) | 33.7 (92.7) | 30.7 (87.3) | 29.0 (84.2) | 29.1 (84.4) | 35.4 (95.7) | 37.0 (98.6) | 38.7 (101.7) | 38.9 (102.0) | 41.2 (106.2) | 41.7 (107.1) |
| Mean daily maximum °C (°F) | 30.4 (86.7) | 30.1 (86.2) | 29.1 (84.4) | 27.2 (81.0) | 24.5 (76.1) | 22.0 (71.6) | 22.0 (71.6) | 23.4 (74.1) | 25.7 (78.3) | 27.1 (80.8) | 28.3 (82.9) | 29.6 (85.3) | 26.6 (79.9) |
| Daily mean °C (°F) | 26.1 (79.0) | 25.8 (78.4) | 24.7 (76.5) | 22.2 (72.0) | 19.2 (66.6) | 16.9 (62.4) | 16.2 (61.2) | 17.1 (62.8) | 19.7 (67.5) | 21.7 (71.1) | 23.5 (74.3) | 25.0 (77.0) | 20.7 (69.3) |
| Mean daily minimum °C (°F) | 21.6 (70.9) | 21.4 (70.5) | 20.2 (68.4) | 17.4 (63.3) | 13.8 (56.8) | 11.9 (53.4) | 10.4 (50.7) | 10.9 (51.6) | 13.9 (57.0) | 16.5 (61.7) | 18.8 (65.8) | 20.5 (68.9) | 16.4 (61.5) |
| Record low °C (°F) | 17.0 (62.6) | 16.5 (61.7) | 12.2 (54.0) | 10.0 (50.0) | 5.0 (41.0) | 5.0 (41.0) | 2.6 (36.7) | 4.1 (39.4) | 7.0 (44.6) | 8.8 (47.8) | 10.8 (51.4) | 14.0 (57.2) | 2.6 (36.7) |
| Average precipitation mm (inches) | 138.1 (5.44) | 185.2 (7.29) | 131.6 (5.18) | 61.3 (2.41) | 61.1 (2.41) | 63.8 (2.51) | 27.5 (1.08) | 34.2 (1.35) | 26.6 (1.05) | 86.3 (3.40) | 95.7 (3.77) | 129.1 (5.08) | 1,011.5 (39.82) |
| Average rainy days (≥ 1 mm) | 8.2 | 10 | 9.7 | 7 | 5.6 | 6.6 | 3.8 | 3.5 | 3.6 | 7.1 | 7.6 | 8.9 | 81.6 |
| Average afternoon relative humidity (%) | 57 | 59 | 57 | 54 | 49 | 52 | 44 | 43 | 48 | 51 | 56 | 57 | 52 |
| Mean monthly sunshine hours | 267 | 235 | 233 | 237 | 239 | 198 | 239 | 270 | 267 | 270 | 273 | 264 | 2,989 |
Source: Bureau of Meteorology

=== Cities and towns ===
Queensland's capital city, Brisbane is located in the most populous region South East Queensland. Also located here is the Gold Coast, Ipswich, Logan, Redcliffe City and Toowoomba the second largest inland city in Australia is located 120 km west of Brisbane on the Darling Downs as well as Warwick.

Townsville is the largest city in the state's north. Other cities in the north of the state include Mount Isa a mining town, Charters Towers, Mackay, the country's biggest exporter of sugar and one of the largest coal exporters in the country and Cairns. In the central regions of the state are the cities of Rockhampton, Bundaberg, Gladstone with its economically important coal exporting port facilities, Maryborough and Hervey Bay. The largest ports in Queensland are the Port of Gladstone, followed by the Port of Brisbane and then the Port of Townsville.

Some Queensland towns and settlements are known as aboriginal communities. Palm Island and Cherbourg are two of the more well-known examples.

=== Transport ===
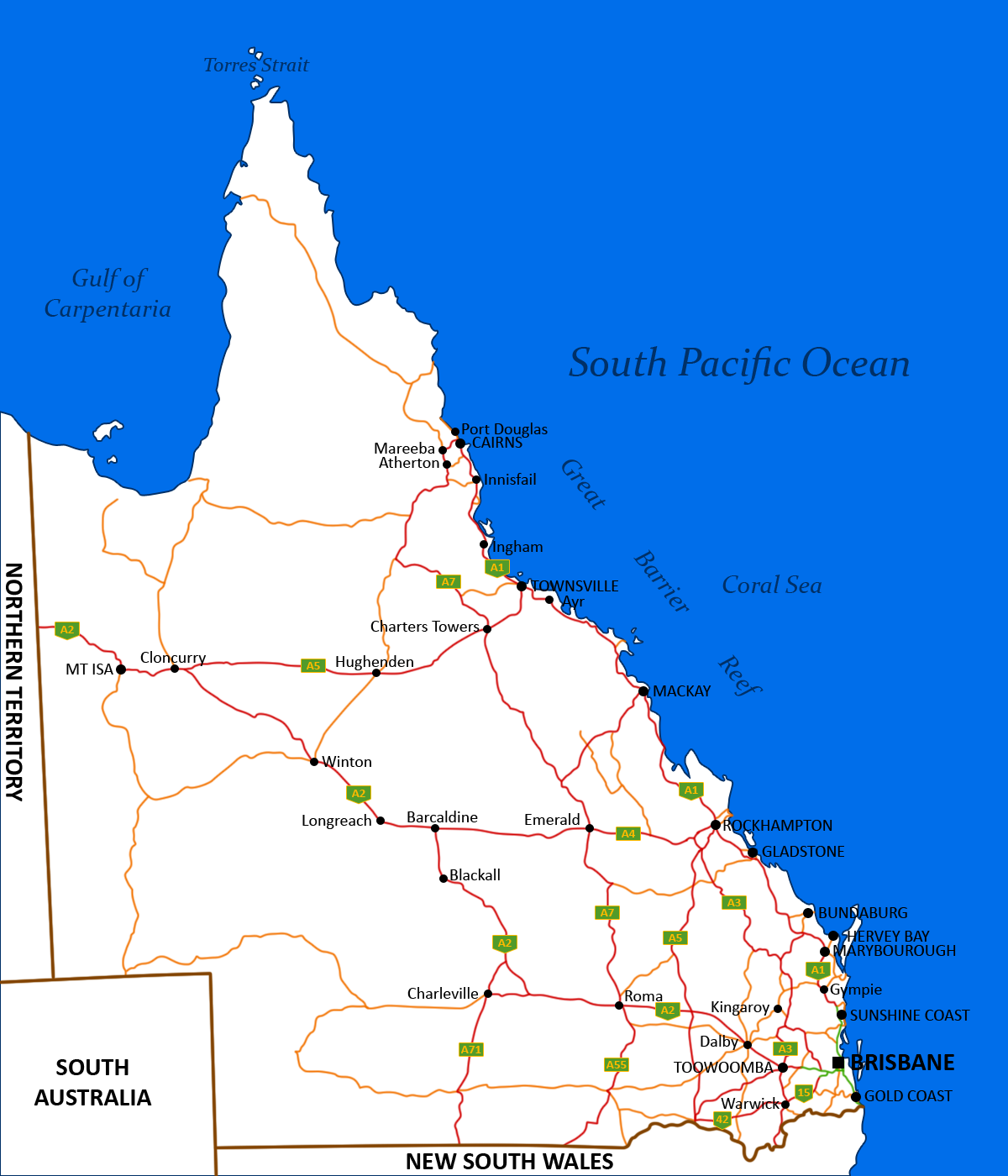
Main roads in Queensland

Rail networks extend along the eastern coast from the Gold Coast to Kuranda. Major branch lines extend inland to Longreach and Charleville and Mount Isa. The Pacific Highway links Brisbane and Sydney along the coast while the New England links the cities inland. The Newell Highway connects Goondiwindi to the southern states via central New South Wales. The Bruce Highway, which travels along the coast from Brisbane to Townsville, has sections near Gympie which were described in a 2006 report as some of the worst national highway in Australia.

== Protected areas ==
Queensland contains significant areas of rainforest and other areas of biological diversity. World Heritage Areas include the Great Barrier Reef, Wet Tropics of Queensland and Gondwana Rainforests of Australia. Queensland has 226 national parks. The largest is Simpson Desert National Park in the remote central west of the state. The most visited national parks in South East Queensland are Tamborine National Park, Lamington National Park and Noosa National Park. These parks are located near centres of major population and are the most accessible in the state. Lamington and other parks around the Scenic Rim such as Main Range National Park, are included in the World Heritage listed Gondwana Rainforests of Australia.

Further afield is the Carnarvon National Park in Central Queensland containing rugged gorge country and some of Australia's finest Aboriginal rock art. In the north of the state are Boodjamulla National Park including Riversleigh, Barron Gorge National Park and Daintree National Park where the Wet Tropics of Queensland meets the Great Barrier Reef. Some waterways are protected in three state marine parks. These are the Great Barrier Reef Marine Park, Great Sandy Marine Park and Moreton Bay Marine Park.

== See also ==
- South East Queensland Regional Plan
- States and territories of Australia
