= Flinders Island language =

Extinct Australian Aboriginal language

Flinders Island
- Native to: Australia
- Region: Flinders Island, Queensland
- Ethnicity: Aba Yalgayi
- Extinct: c. 2000
- Language family: Pama–Nyungan: Paman; North Cape York; Wik; Flinders Island

Language codes
- ISO 639-3: fln
- Glottolog: flin1247
- AIATSIS: Y67
- ELP: Flinders Island

The Flinders Island language is an extinct Australian Aboriginal language spoken on Flinders Island off the coast of Queensland, Australia. It is unconfirmed as a distinct language. The inhabitants of the island were the Aba Yalgayi. There were 3 speakers reported in 1981.

One of the last known speakers of the language was Johnny Flinders.

A non-Indigenous linguist, Peter Sutton, has been reported to speak the Flinders Island language.

== Names ==
The name Biyalgeyi have been used, but there is no evidence it refers to a language. Yalgawarra is a clan name.

== Sources ==
- Langton, Marcia (2012). "The Diaspora and the Return: History and Memorty in Cape York Peninsula, Australia". In Hendry, Joy; Fitznor, Laara (eds.). Anthropologists, Indigenous Scholars and the Research Endeavour: Seeking Bridges Towards Mutual Respect. Routledge. pp. 171–184. ISBN 978-1-136-33115-2.
