= Hales Island (Queensland) =

Island in Queensland, Australia

- Interactive map of Hales Island

Geography
- Location: Northern Australia
- Coordinates: 14.184°S 144.538°E
- Area: 0.01 km^{2} (0.0039 sq mi)

Administration
- Australia
- State: Queensland

Hales Island is part of the Great Barrier Reef Marine Park 5 km east of Cape Melville, Queensland. It is around 1 hectares or 0.01 square km in size.

There is a significant population of Torresian imperial pigeons in the area.
