= Pipon Island =

Island in Queensland, Australia

- Interactive map of Pipon Island

Geography
- Location: Northern Australia
- Coordinates: 14.118°S 144.529°E

Administration
- Australia
- State: Queensland

Pipon Island, also known as Walmbaywi, is part of the Great Barrier Reef Marine Park at the tip of Cape Melville, Queensland, Australia. It is around 67 hectares or 0.67 square km in size.

The Cape was the scene of several wrecks and mass drownings of lugger crews in the 1890s and there is a monument on the 300 m high mountain on the cape. Pipon Island now contains a cruise ship anchorage.
