= Cape Melville shadeskink =

Conservation status
- Vulnerable (IUCN 3.1)

Scientific classification
- Kingdom: Animalia
- Phylum: Chordata
- Class: Reptilia
- Order: Squamata
- Family: Scincidae
- Genus: Saproscincus
- Species: S. saltus

Binomial name
- Saproscincus saltus Hoskin, 2013

Species of lizard

The Cape Melville shadeskink (Saproscincus saltus) is a species of lizards from the Cape York Peninsula of Queensland, Australia, described in 2013. It was one of three vertebrates discovered by scientists from James Cook University and National Geographic in an area of mountain rainforest in North Queensland. The lizards are active by day, running and jumping through the mossy boulder fields of Northern Queensland.

== See also ==
- Saltuarius eximius
- Cophixalus petrophilus
