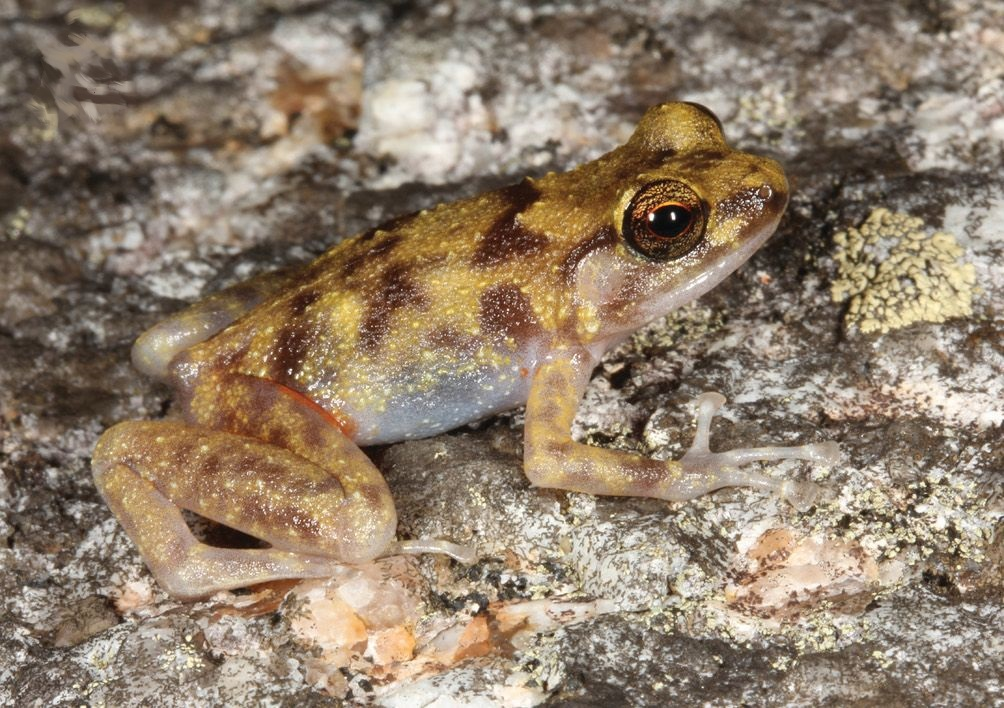
- Male Cophixalus petrophilus

Scientific classification
- Kingdom: Animalia
- Phylum: Chordata
- Class: Amphibia
- Order: Anura
- Family: Microhylidae
- Genus: Cophixalus
- Species: C. petrophilus

Binomial name
- Cophixalus petrophilus Hoskin, 2013

= Cophixalus petrophilus =

Species of amphibian

Cophixalus petrophilus, the blotched boulder-frog, is a species of frogs from the Cape York Peninsula (Queensland, Australia) that was described in 2013. It is one of three newly described vertebrate species from Cape Melville, Australia, the other two being skink Saproscincus saltus and gecko Saltuarius eximius. The specific name petrophilus means "rock-loving" and refers to restriction of this species to boulder field habitats.

== Description ==
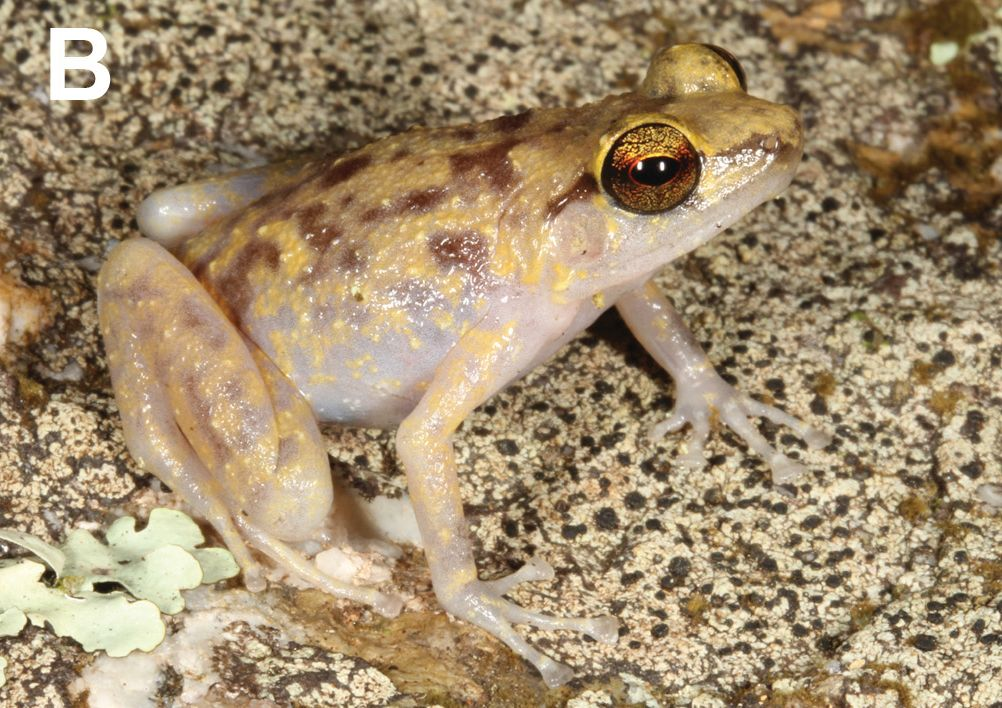
Cophixalus petrophilus female

Adult males measure 26–28 mm (1.0–1.1 in) and adult females 31–32 mm (1.2–1.3 in) in snout–vent length. The head is narrower than the body. The snout is blunt to projecting in profile. The tympanum is comparatively large but indistinct to moderately distinct, bordered by the supra-tympanic fold. The limbs are relatively long. The fingers and toes have no webbing. Fingers II–IV have large, truncated discs. The toe discs are also enlarged but smaller than those of the fingers. Skin is smooth but has some scattered, fine tubercles on the dorsum. Dorsal colouration is creamy yellow with dark brown blotching, which is paler in females than in males. The markings include a prominent W-mark on the shoulders and a bar between the eyes. A dark horizontal line runs through the iris. The ventral surfaces are uniformly white or pinkish grey; the throat is white.

== Reproduction ==
The male advertisement call is a fairly short, medium-paced, low-pitched rattle (dominant frequency about 1300 Hz).

Reproduction has not been observed, but this species is likely to lay its eggs in moist rock cracks, as known for closely related species Cophixalus saxatilis. The development is likely direct, with the tadpoles developing within the eggs while being guarded by the male, emerging as fully formed froglets when they hatch out.

== Habitat ==
Cophixalus petrophilus is restricted to the boulder fields of Cape Melville

Cophixalus petrophilus is restricted to granite boulder fields that are largely devoid of vegetation and is known from two sites a few kilometers apart on the Melville Range at elevations of 120 and 470 m (390 and 1,540 ft) above sea level. It is sympatric with Cophixalus zweifeli, but the latter is associated with boulders under or near rainforest, instead of more purely rocky habitats. Cophixalus petrophilus were observed to be active at night after or during rains, sitting on surface boulders of very deeply piled boulder fields. The holotype male was calling from inside the boulder layers.
