= Flinders Island (Queensland) =

Island in Queensland, Australia

- Coordinates: 14°10′48″S 144°15′36″E
- Country: Australia
- State: Queensland
- LGA: Shire of Cook

Government
  - State electorate: Cook
  - Federal division: Leichhardt

Flinders Island is an island that forms part of the Great Barrier Reef Marine Park at the tip of Cape Melville, Queensland in Bathurst Bay. The original indigenous name was Wurriima.

It is north of Denham Island in the Flinders Group National Park. It is separated from Stanley Island by Owen Channel and Maclear Island by Fly Channel.

The traditional owners formed part of a multi-lingual cultural complex extending from Bathurst Head to Cape Melville, which once, prior to the destructive advent of settlers, lugger crews in the late 19th century colonial period, numbered an estimated 200 people. It became one of the earliest centres for recruiting local hands for the pearling trade. These people were still shot or raped at gunpoint as late as the early 1900s.

There is a major residential site on the sandspit. The island is a popular tourist destination with an anchorage point for yachts. Flinders Island is an integral part of the mythological complex of the Flinders Group.

== See also ==
- Flinders Island language
