= Flinders Group National Park (Cape York Peninsula Aboriginal Land) =

National park

- IUCN category II (national park)
- Location within Queensland
- Location: Queensland
- Nearest city: Cooktown
- Coordinates: 14°04′25″S 144°15′21″E
- Area: 33.2 km^{2} (12.8 sq mi)
- Established: 1939
- Governing body: Queensland Parks and Wildlife Service
- Website: Official website

Flinders Group National Park (Cape York Peninsula Aboriginal Land) is a national park in Queensland (Australia), 1,745 kilometres (1,084 mi) northwest of Brisbane. The national park was previously named Flinders Group National Park until it was renamed on 28 November 2013.

This national park has a tropical climate, with a humid season from December to April, when temperatures exceed 30 °C (86 °F).

Many species of land and sea birds are represented here.

== Protected islands ==
Island	Area (km^{2})
Blackwood Island	1.82
Clack Island	0.68
Denham Island	4.04
Flinders Island	15.33
King Island (Queensland)	2.41
Maclear Island	0.11
Other	0.02
Stanley Island	8.79

== See also ==
- Protected areas of Queensland
