= John Maclear =

British naval officer and hydrographer

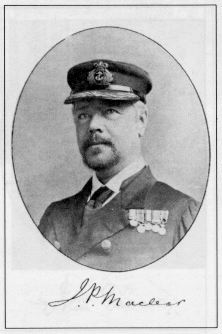
John Maclear Portrait

John Fiot Lee Pearse Maclear (27 June 1838 in Cape Town – 17 July 1907 in Niagara) was an admiral in the Royal Navy, known for his leadership in hydrography.

He is best known for being commander of HMS Challenger during the Challenger Expedition (1872–1876) under its commission captain, Sir George Nares, for the voyage of scientific discovery in which the ship went round the world. This expedition led to the science of oceanography, after which various ocean features are named, including the Challenger Plateau near New Zealand. During this expedition the Maclear's Rat on Christmas Island in the Indian Ocean was named after him. He is also honoured in the specific epithet of Dicliptera maclearii, a plant in the family Acanthaceae which is endemic to Christmas Island.

== Royal Navy career ==
Maclear entered the Navy in September 1851 as a cadet on board the frigate Castor, then bearing the broad pennant of Commodore Christopher Wyvill, then commanding the Cape station. In her he saw service during the Xhosa Wars in 1851, and afterwards, as a midshipman of Algiers, served in the Baltic and in the Black Sea from 1854 to 1856, receiving, the Baltic, Turkish, and Crimean medals, with the clasp for Sevastopol. He passed his lieutenant's examination in July 1857, and served on board Cyclops in the Red Sea as mate during the outbreak at Jeddah in 1858.

On 19 May 1859 he was promoted to lieutenant, and shortly afterwards was appointed to HMS Sphinx, in which he served on the China station until 1862, being present at several engagements during the second Chinese war, and especially at Taku Forts, for which he received the clasp. In 1863 he went to Excellent to qualify as a gunnery lieutenant. In February 1864, Maclear was appointed to Princess Royal, flagship on the China station. He returned to England in her and, in October 1867, was chosen to be first lieutenant of the frigate HMS Octavia, flagship of Commodore Heath in the East Indies. In her he took part in the Abyssinian campaign of 1868, earning the medal and his promotion to commander on 14 August 1868.

In 1872 Challenger was commissioned by Sir George Nares, with Maclear as his commander, for the voyage of scientific discovery around the world. Returning home in her in 1876, on 14 August Maclear was promoted to captain. In 1879 he succeeded Sir George Nares in command of the sloop Alert and remained in her until 1882, completing the survey of the Straits of Magellan. From 1883 to 1887 he commanded Flying Fish on surveying service.

On 20 June 1891 he reached flag rank, and two months later retired. He was promoted to vice admiral on the retired list in 1897, and to admiral on the retired list on 21 January 1903.

After leaving the sea, Maclear assisted in the compilation of several volumes of the official sailing directions, especially those for the Eastern Archipelago (1890 and 1893), for the west coasts of Central America and the United States (1896), for Bering Sea and Alaska (1898), and the 'Arctic Pilot' (vol. ii. 1901 and vol. iii. 1905).

He was a fellow of both the Royal Geographical Society and Royal Meteorological Society.

== Family ==
Maclear was the second son and eighth child of Irishman Sir Thomas Maclear, Her Majesty's astronomer at the Cape of Good Hope. He married, on 4 June 1878, Julia, the sixth daughter of Sir John Frederick William Herschel. They had no children. He died from heart failure in a hotel at Niagara on 17 July 1907. His body was taken to England for burial, and he was buried in St Marylebone Cemetery,

== Legacy ==
Maclear Island in Queensland, Australia is named after him, as is Mount Maclear (Latitude -20.317, Longitude 148.783)) near Proserpine, Queensland, Australia. The Maclear's rat is also named after him.
