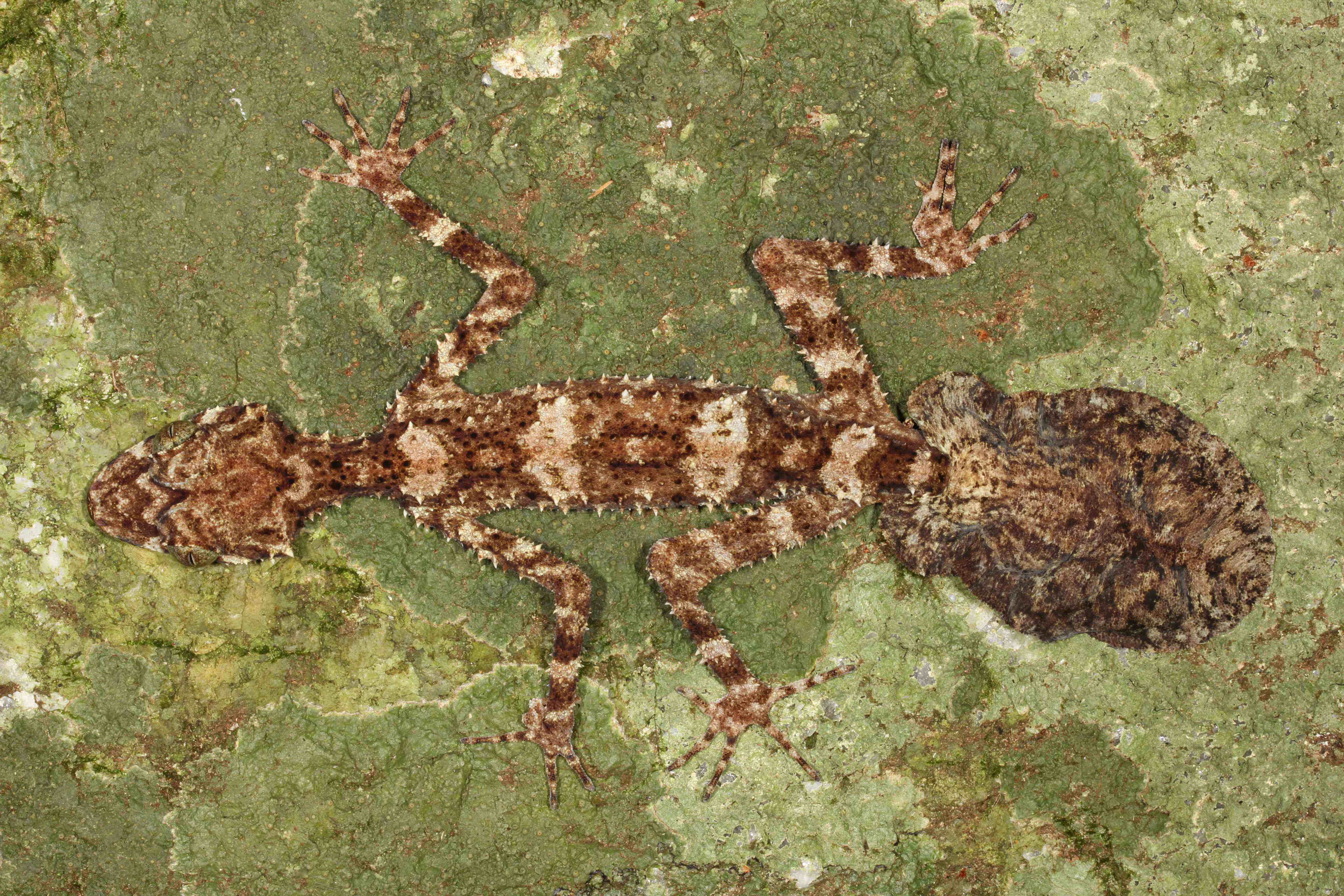

Scientific classification
- Domain: Eukaryota
- Kingdom: Animalia
- Phylum: Chordata
- Class: Reptilia
- Order: Squamata
- Infraorder: Gekkota
- Family: Carphodactylidae
- Genus: Saltuarius
- Species: S. eximius

Binomial name
- Saltuarius eximius Hoskin & Couper, 2013

= Cape Melville leaf-tailed gecko =

Species of lizard

The Cape Melville leaf-tailed gecko (Saltuarius eximius) is a species of geckos that is endemic to the Melville Range on Cape Melville in Northern Australia. The species was described in 2013 by Australian zoologists Conrad Hoskin (of James Cook University) and Patrick J. Couper (curator of herpetology at Queensland Museum). The lizards are about 20 cm (7.9 in) long and are believed to be a relic species from the time period rainforests were more abundant in Australia. The name derives from the Latin word for "extraordinary" or "exquisite", and refers to the lizard's distinctive, camouflaged appearance. It hides among rocky boulders in the day and emerges at night to hunt on rocks and trees. The lizard has large eyes, a long and slender body, and specialized limbs adapted to life in dimly lit boulder fields.

On 23 May 2014, the International Institute for Species Exploration declared the gecko as one of the "Top 10 New Species of 2014". The reasons for its selection are its camouflage to its surrounding rocks, and by which it hunts prey.
