= Denham Island =

Island in, Queensland, Australia

- Interactive map of Denham Island

Geography
- Location: Northern Australia
- Coordinates: 14.228°S 144.266°E
- Area: 3.9 km^{2} (1.5 sq mi)

Administration
- Australia
- State: Queensland

Denham Island is part of the Great Barrier Reef Marine Park at the tip of Cape Melville, Queensland in Bathurst Bay.

It is the southernmost island in the Flinders Group National Park. It is south of Flinders Island. It is around 390 hectares or 3.9 square km in size.

Aboriginal mythology (Cooktown) states Denham Island as a major Moon-Myth site, believed to have been originally joined to Bathurst Heads but later pushed out by the moon.
