= Bathurst Bay =

Bay in Queensland, Australia

Coordinates: 14°15′0″S 144°22′30″E

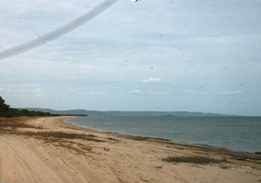
Bathurst Bay

Bathurst Bay is a bay in the localities of Lakefield and Starcke in the Shire of Cook, Queensland, Australia. In the 19th century it was the base for the pearling fleet. It is now a tourist attraction for Cape York Peninsula in northern Queensland, Australia, near the Great Barrier Reef.

== History ==
The area was home to the Mutumui and Walmbaria tribes. The British first settled Bathurst Bay sometime in the early-19th Century. The settlement had few tradable goods because of its climate and terrain. The site became important in the mid- to late-19th Century as an anchorage for the pearling fleet, which was discovering valuable oyster pearls. By the 1890s, the pearling fleet was the only reason for continued settlement. The settlement was destroyed on 4 March 1899, when Cyclone Mahina passed through northern Queensland. Cyclone Mahina was notable for producing the highest recorded storm surge of any tropical cyclone in history. The once-abundant forests have not regrown, mainly because of continuing salt damage to the land by the storm surge. Since the Federation of Australia in 1901, Bathurst Bay has become a popular fishing area. Few people have settled the bay area.

== See also ==
- Princess Charlotte Bay
- Blackwood Island
