= Cape Melville =

Point in Queensland, Australia

- Cape
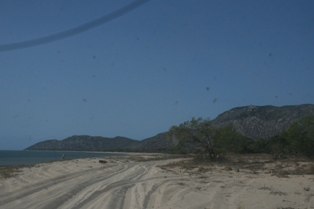
- Beach at Cape Melville

- Location within Australia
- Coordinates: 14°10′12″S 144°31′24″E
- Location: Cape York Peninsula, Australia
- Water bodies: Coral Sea

Cape Melville is a headland on the eastern coast of the Cape York Peninsula in Australia. To its west lies Princess Charlotte Bay. It is part of the Cape Melville National Park. Cape Melville was named Stoney Cape in 1815 by Lieutenant Charles Jeffreys on the HM Kangaroo but later renamed by him as Cape Melville

Pipon Island is about six km north of the cape and Hales Island about two km east, both part of the Great Barrier Reef Marine Park. King Island lies several kilometres to the north west of the cape. The highest peak on the cape is Abbey Peak, which named in 1901 by Commander Munro. R.N., while aboard HMS Dart.

The cape consists of granite outcrops which formed 250 million years ago.

== Unique ecosystem ==
The headland has been described as a "lost world". Several animal species have existed in an isolated section of rainforest for millions of years. A field of granite boulders has prevented bushfires from affecting the area and kept moisture in.

In March 2013, a team of scientists and filmmakers joined the ranks of the few human visitors to the misty rain forest atop the Melville Range, a small mountain range on Cape Melville, part of northeastern Australia's Cape York Peninsula.

The fauna and flora found near Cape Melville is diverse and includes several endemic species, including the Foxtail Palm the Cape Melville leaf-tailed gecko, the Cape Melville shade skink, the Blotched boulder-frog and the Cape Melville Tree Frog.

== See also ==
- Protected areas in Queensland
- Cape Melville affair
