= AFL Victoria Country =

Football governing body in Australia

AFL Victoria Country is an Australian rules football governing body with jurisdiction over the state of Victoria outside metropolitan Melbourne on behalf of AFL Victoria. As well as administering and promoting the code in the regions, it often arbitrates disputes in areas such as player clearances and club movements between country leagues, and may also be called upon as a higher authority of appeal. The organisation was formed as a result of a merger between Victorian Country Football League (VCFL) and AFL Victoria in November 2012.

The then-VCFL aired telecasts beginning in 2010 on C31 Melbourne, along with Geelong Football League and Geelong & District Football League. The women's netball coverage also was broadcast on community TV in 2010.

== Victorian Country Championships ==
The VCFL originally organised the interleague Victorian Country Football Championships back in 1954.

In 1958, the VCFL initiated the Centenary Championships, to mark the 100th anniversary of the inception of Australian Rules football. The 15 major leagues of Victoria and southern NSW were divided into four districts, with each pool conducting a championships.

Caltex had the naming rights of the Victorian Country Championships matches in the 1960s. The 16 league series would run over a two-year period, with knock out matches in the first season, followed by semi finals and a grand final in the following season.

The Country Championship were discontinued from 1975 before being re-established in 1978.

From 2004 to 2006 the championships were decided at a carnival round-robin competition at one venue over a single weekend, with each of the four sides playing the others in matches of two twenty-minute halves. The team on top of the ladder, based on points (4 for a win, 2 for a draw) and then percentage (points scored over points conceded) after these three matches, were declared the winner. Leagues not represented in the top four pools of four participated in other interleague matches organised by the VCFL. In 2007, there was no statewide VCFL Championships, just a rivalry round was played between close by leagues, (with the O&MFL playing the GVFL), with the round robin format returning in 2008.

In 2009, the championships reverted to head-to-head full matches on a rankings scale per year.

In 2020, the championships matches were cancelled due to COVID-19 and have since been discontinued. The Goulburn Valley Football League and the Ovens & Murray Football League continue to play each other once a year.

The Ash - Wilson Trophy was formed in 2001 and is only for matches involving the Goulburn Valley Football League and the Ovens & Murray Football League, In honour of former players, Stephen Ash and Mick Wilson.

VCFL - Division 1 Champions

- 1954: Ovens & Murray FL d Bendigo FL at Ballarat
- 1955: Ovens & Murray FL d Ballarat FL at Albury
- 1956: Ballarat FL d Ovens & Murray FL at Bendigo
- 1957: Ovens & Murray FL d Ballarat FL at Albury
- 1958: ?
- 1959: ?
- 1960: ?
- 1961/62: Bendigo FL d Wimmera FL at Horsham
- 1963/64: South West FL (NSW) d Hampden FL at Narrandera
- 1965/66: Hampden FL d Ovens & Murray FL at Wangaratta
- 1967/68: Ovens & Murray FL d Wimmera FL at Horsham
- 1969/70: Hampden FL d Ovens & Murray FL
- 1971/72: Bendigo FL d Murray FL at Cobram
- 1973/74: North Central FL d Hampden FL
- 1975: VCFL Country Championships discontinued in 1975. Re-established in 1978.
- 1976: N/A
- 1977: N/A
- 1978: Goulburn Valley FL d Hampden FL at Colac.
- 1979: Latrobe Valley: 15.13 - 103 d Bendigo: 9.15 - 69 at Bendigo
- 1980: Latrobe Valley FL d Ovens & Murray FL at Sale
- 1981: Ballarat FL: 21.18 - 144 d Western Border: 11.18 - 84 at Colraine
- 1982: Ballarat FL: 13.19 - 97 d Ovens & Murray FL: 8.20 - 68 at Eastern Oval, Ballarat
- 1983: Ballarat FL: 16.15 - 111 d Goulburn Valley: 13.5 - 83 at Shepparton
- 1984: Goulburn Valley FL d Geelong FL
- 1985: Ovens & Murray FL d Ballarat FL at Wangaratta
- 1986: Ballarat FL: 11.12 - 78 d Goulburn Valley: 6.5 - 41 at City Oval, Ballarat
- 1987: Ovens & Murray FL d Sunraysia FL at Mildura
- 1988: Geelong FL: 20.7 - 127 d Bendigo FL: 8.10 - 58 at St. Albans Reserve, Geelong
- 1989: Bendigo FL d Geelong FL at Bendigo
- 1990: Latrobe Valley FL d Bendigo FL at Sale
- 1991: Hampden FL d Geelong FL
- 1992: Geelong FL d LaTrobe FL at Geelong
- 1993: Geelong FL d Bendigo FL at Bendigo
- 1994: Goulburn Valley FL d ?
- 1995: Gippsland Latrobe FL d Mid Murray FL at Swan Hill
- 1996: Ovens & Murray FL d Geelong FL at Wodonga
- 1997: Ovens & Murray FL d Geelong FL at Geelong
- 1998: Ovens & Murray FL d Geelong FL at Wodonga
- 1999: Ovens & Murray FL d Gippsland LaTrobe FL at Moe
- 2000: Geelong FL d Gippsland Latrobe FL at Geelong
- 2001: Ovens & Murray FL d Goulburn Valley FL at Lavington, NSW
- 2002: Mornington Peninsula Nepean FL d Hampden FL
- 2003: Geelong FL d Goulburn Valley FL at Shepparton
- 2004: 1st: Geelong FL at Shepparton
- 2005: 1st: Goulburn Valley FL at Kardinia Park, Geelong
- 2006: 1st: Ovens & Murray FL at Lavington Sports Ground, NSW
- 2007: No VCFL Championships in 2007. A rivalry round was played.
- 2008: 1st: Ovens & Murray FL at Shepparton
- 2009: Ovens & Murray defeated Goulburn Valley FL at Shepparton
- 2010: Goulburn Valley FL defeated Ovens & Murray FL at Lavington
- 2011: Goulburn Valley FL defeated Ballarat FL at Shepparton
- 2012: Goulburn Valley FL defeated Mornington Peninsula FL at Shepparton
- 2013: Geelong FL defeated Goulburn Valley FL at Geelong
- 2014: Geelong FL defeated Peninsula FL at Geelong
- 2015: Geelong FL defeated Goulburn Valley FL at Shepparton
- 2016: Geelong FL defeated Eastern FL at Geelong
- 2017: Geelong FL defeated Mornington Peninsula Nepean FL at MCG, Jolimont
- 2018: Eastern FL defeated Geelong FL at Etihad Stadium, Melbourne
- 2019: Northern FL d Geelong FL at KFC Oval, Geelong

Most Division 1 Country Championship wins / Runners Up

Club	Most Championships	Runners up
Ovens & Murray FL	14	6
Geelong FL	10	10
Goulburn Valley FL	7	7
Ballarat FL	5	4
Bendigo FL	3	5
Hampden FL	3	1
LaTrobe Valley FL	3	
Eastern FL	1	
Gippsland LaTrobe FL	1	
Mornington Pensula FL	1	
North Central FL	1	
South Western FL	1	
Benalla Tungamah FL		1
Murray FL		1
Sunraysia FL		1

*Country Championships: Division 2

- 1984 - Riverina FL: 12.11 - 83 d West Gippsland: 8.12 - 60
- 1985 - Western Border FL
- 1986 - Sunraysia FL
- 1987 - Western Border FL
- 1988 - Wimmera FL
- 1989 - Hampden FL
- 1990 - Riverina FL d North Central
- 1991 - Ballarat FL
- 1992 - Mid Murray FL
- 1993 - Hampden FL
- 1994 - Ovens & Murray FL d North Central FL
- 1995 - Ballarat FL
- 1996 - Murray FL
- 1997 - Mornington Peninsula Nepean FL
- 1998 - Western Border FL
- 1999 - West Gippsland FL
- 2000 - Bendigo FL
- 2001 - Ballarat FL d Central Murray FL
- 2002 - Bendigo FL d Central Murray FL
- 2003 - Ballarat FL d Central Murray FL
- 2004 - Ballarat FL
- 2005 - West Gippsland LaTrobe FL
- 2006 - Hampden FL

*Country Championships: Division 3

- 1994 - Bellarine FL
- 1995 - Riddell FL
- 2004 - Wimmera FL
- 2005 - Bellarine FL
- 2006 - Bendigo FL

*Country Championships: Division 4 / Pool D

- 2004 - Bellarine FL
- 2005 - Murray FL
- 2006 - Sunraysia FL

== Representative Sides ==
On occasion, a Victoria Country representative side may be selected to play in one-off fixtures against other representative teams such as interstate counterparts or the Victorian Amateur Football Association, as well as the Australian Country Football Championships.

VCFL v VAFA matches

- 1984: VAFA: 15.10 - 100 d VCFL: 11.15 - 81 at the QE Oval, Bendigo
- 1985: VCFL: 18.9 - 117 d VAFA: 7.15 - 57 at Mildura Oval
- 1987: VCFL: 18.11 - 119 v VAFA: 7.13 - 55 at Lavington, NSW. 21/06/87
- 1993: VAFA: 13.14 - 92 d VCFL: 13.12 - 90 at Elsternwick Park Oval
- 1995: VAFA: 11.12 - 78 d VCFL: 10.10 - 70 at Morwell
- 1997: VCFL: 23.16 - 154 d VAFA: 8.9 - 57 at Elsternwick Park Oval
- 1999: VCFL: 19.14 - 128 d VAFA: 13.12 - 90 at Shell Stadium, Geelong
- 2001: VAFA: 23.14 - 152 d VCFL: 14.8 - 92 at Elsternwick Park
- 2003: VAFA: 14.11 - 95 d VCFL: 10.9 - 69 at Barooga, NSW
- 2005: VCFL: 13.13 - 91 d VAFA: 8.14 - 62 at Elsternwick Park
- 2007: VCFL: 11.11 - 77 d VAFA: 11.10 - 76 at Eastern Oval, Ballarat
- 2009: VCFL: 17.8 - 110 d VAFA: 15.16 - 106 at Junction Oval, St. Kilda
- 2011: VAFA: 13.14 - 92 d VCFL: 13.8 - 86 at Deakin Reserve, Shepparton
- 2013: VAFA: 11.16 - 82 d AFL Victorian Country: 11.13 - 79 at Junction Oval, St. Kilda
- 2015: AFL Victorian Country: 17.15 - 117 d VAFA: 8.7 - 55 at QE Oval, Bendigo
- 2017: VAFA: 24.8 - 152 d AFL Victorian Country: 10.10 - 70 at Frankston City Oval
- 2019: AFL Victorian Country: 11.15 - 81 d VAFA: 9.10 - 64 at Ikon (Princes) Park, Carlton
- 2021: No rep football due to COVID-19
- 2023: ?

VCFL v VFA

- 1992: VFA: 32.7 - 199 d VCFL: 15.7 - 97. At the Melbourne Cricket Ground. 26 May 1992.

== Affiliated Boards & Leagues ==
Note: "Major Leagues" are shown in Bold / "District Leagues" are shown in Italics.

=== Ballarat ===
- **Ballarat Football League (Est. 1893)**
- Central Highlands Football League (Est. 1979)

=== Bendigo ===
- **Bendigo Football League (Est. 1880)**
- Heathcote District Football League (Est. 1907)
- Loddon Valley Football League (Est. 1903)
- Maryborough Castlemaine District Football League (Est. 1907)

=== Geelong ===
- **Bellarine Football League (Est. 1971)**
- **Geelong Football League (Est. 1979)**
- Geelong & District Football League (Est. 1879)

=== Gippsland & Latrobe Valley ===
- Alberton Football Netball League (Est. 1946)
- East Gippsland Football League (Est. 1974)
- Ellinbank & District Football League (Est. 1937)
- **Gippsland Football League (Est. 1902)**
- Mid Gippsland Football League (Est. 1935)
- North Gippsland Football League (Est. 1955)
- Omeo & District Football League (Est. 1893)

=== Goulburn Murray ===
- **Goulburn Valley Football League (Est. 1894)**
- Kyabram & District Football League (Est. 1932)
- **Murray Football League (Est. 1931)**
- Picola & District Football League (Est. 1934)

=== North East Border ===
- Ovens & King Football League (Est. 1903)
- **Ovens & Murray Football League (Est. 1893)**
- Tallangatta & District Football League (Est. 1945)
- Upper Murray Football Netball League (Est. 1893)

=== Mallee ===
- **Central Murray Football League (Est. 1997)**
- **North Central Football League (Est. 1930)**

=== South East ===
- **Mornington Peninsula Nepean Football League (Est. 1987)**
- **Outer East Football Netball League** **(Est. 2018)**

=== South West ===
- Mininera & District Football League (Est. 1925)
- South West District Football League (Est. 1970)
- Colac & District Football League (Est. 1937)
- **Hampden Football Netball League (Est. 1930)**
- Warrnambool District Football League (Est. 1946)

=== Sunraysia ===
- Millewa Football League (Est. 1926)
- **Sunraysia Football League (Est. 1945)**

=== Wimmera ===
- Horsham & District Football League (Est. 1937)
- **Wimmera Football League (Est. 1937)**
