= Swan Reach =

Swan Reach may refer to the following places in Australia:

- Swan Reach, South Australia
- Swan Reach, Victoria
