= Riviera Football League =

Australian rules football league

The Riviera Football League was an Australian rules football league in the East Gippsland region of Victoria, Australia.

== History ==
The Riviera FL was created in 1986, when the second division of the East Gippsland Football League broke away to form its own league, joined by some clubs from the North Gippsland Football League. The league disbanded after the 2003 season, with remaining teams moving to the North Gippsland FL, East Gippsland FL and Omeo District FL.

== Clubs ==
=== Final clubs ===
Club	Jumper	Nickname	Home Ground	Former League	Est.	Years in RFL	Premierships		Fate
Club	Jumper	Nickname	Home Ground	Former League	Est.	Years in RFL	Total	Years	Fate
Boisdale-Briagolong		Bombers	Boisdale Recreation Reserve, Boisdale	NGFL	1982	1986–2003	3	1995, 2000, 2001	Moved to North Gippsland FL in 2004
Lindenow South		Swampies	Lindenow South Recreation Reserve, Lindenow South	EGFL	1902	1986–2003	4	1986, 1997, 1998, 1999	Moved to Omeo District FL in 2004
Nambrok		Hawks	Nambrok Recreation Reserve, Nambrok	NGFL	1913	2001–2003	0	-	Moved to North Gippsland FL in 2004
Newry		Crows	Newry Recreation Reserve, Newry	NGFL	c.1900	1989–2003	4	1992, 1993, 1994, 1996	Moved to North Gippsland FL in 2004
Paynesville		Gulls	AJ Freeman Reserve, Paynesville	EGFL	c.1920	1986–2003	0	-	Moved to North Gippsland FL in 2004
Stratford		Swans	Stratford Recreation Reserve, Stratford	NGFL	c.1900	1989–2003	3	1990, 2002, 2003	Moved to North Gippsland FL in 2004

=== Former clubs ===
Club	Jumper	Nickname	Home Ground	Former League	Est.	Years in RFL	Premierships		Fate
Club	Jumper	Nickname	Home Ground	Former League	Est.	Years in RFL	Total	Years	Fate
RAAF East Sale		Cats	RAAF East Sale	NGFL	1943	1986–1992	0	-	Folded in 1992
Swan Reach		Swans	Swan Reach Recreation Reserve, Swan Reach	EGFL	c.1920	1986–1995	0	-	Entered recess in 1996, re-formed in Omeo District FL in 1997
West Bairnsdale		Hawks	West Bairnsdale Oval, Bairnsdale	EGFL	1963	1986–2001	4	1987, 1988, 1989, 1991	Folded in 2001

== 2003 Ladder ==
Riviera FL	Wins	Byes	Losses	Draws	For	Against	%	Pts
Stratford	13	0	1	1	1837	632	290.66%	54
Nambrok	9	0	6	0	1729	1033	167.38%	36
Newry	8	0	6	1	1587	1009	157.28%	34
Paynesville	8	0	7	0	1418	1134	125.04%	32
Boisdale-Briagolong	6	0	9	0	1459	1225	119.10%	24
Lindenow South	0	0	15	0	244	3241	7.53%	0

FINALS

Final	Team	G	B	Pts	Team	G	B	Pts
1st Semi	Paynesville	17	10	112	Newry	8	6	54
2nd Semi	Stratford	20	9	129	Nambrok	6	7	43
Preliminary	Nambrok	18	14	122	Paynesville	6	6	42
Grand	Stratford	17	12	114	Nambrok	9	3	57
