= Lindenow, Victoria =

Lindenow
- Town
- Interactive map of Lindenow
- Coordinates: 37°48′0″S 147°29′0″E
- Country: Australia
- State: Victoria
- LGA: Shire of East Gippsland
- Location: 257 km (160 mi) E of Melbourne; 20 km (12 mi) W of Bairnsdale

Government
  - State electorate: Gippsland East
  - Federal division: Gippsland

Population
  - Total: 449 (2016 census)
- Postcode: 3865

Lindenow is a town in Victoria, Australia, located on Bairnsdale-Dargo Road, in the Shire of East Gippsland near Bairnsdale.

At the 2016 census, Lindenow had a population of 449.

Lindenow is a small town, with a small centre and hotel. The fertile river flats of Lindenow produce vegetables that are shipped all around Australia and represent premium product.

== Mitchell River National Park ==
Mitchell River National Park surrounds the spectacular Mitchell River where it passes between high cliffs. There are several gorges, including the Den of Nargun mentioned in Aboriginal Legends. Remnants of temperate rainforest line some of the gorges. The park is 11,900 ha (29,000 acres) in size and contains some of Gippsland's best forest country.

== Football ==
The town has an Australian Rules football team competing in the East Gippsland Football League. One of the founding clubs of the league in 1974, they are known as the Cats. They won the premiership in 1980, 1986, 1989, 1991, 2019 & 2026

The Lindenow South team, the Swampies (Swamp Hawks), has competed in the Omeo & District Football League since 2004. Prior to that they competed in the Riviera Football League from 1986 to 2003.

== Railway ==
Lindenow station was opened in 1888 and closed in 1981.
