= Briagolong =

- Town
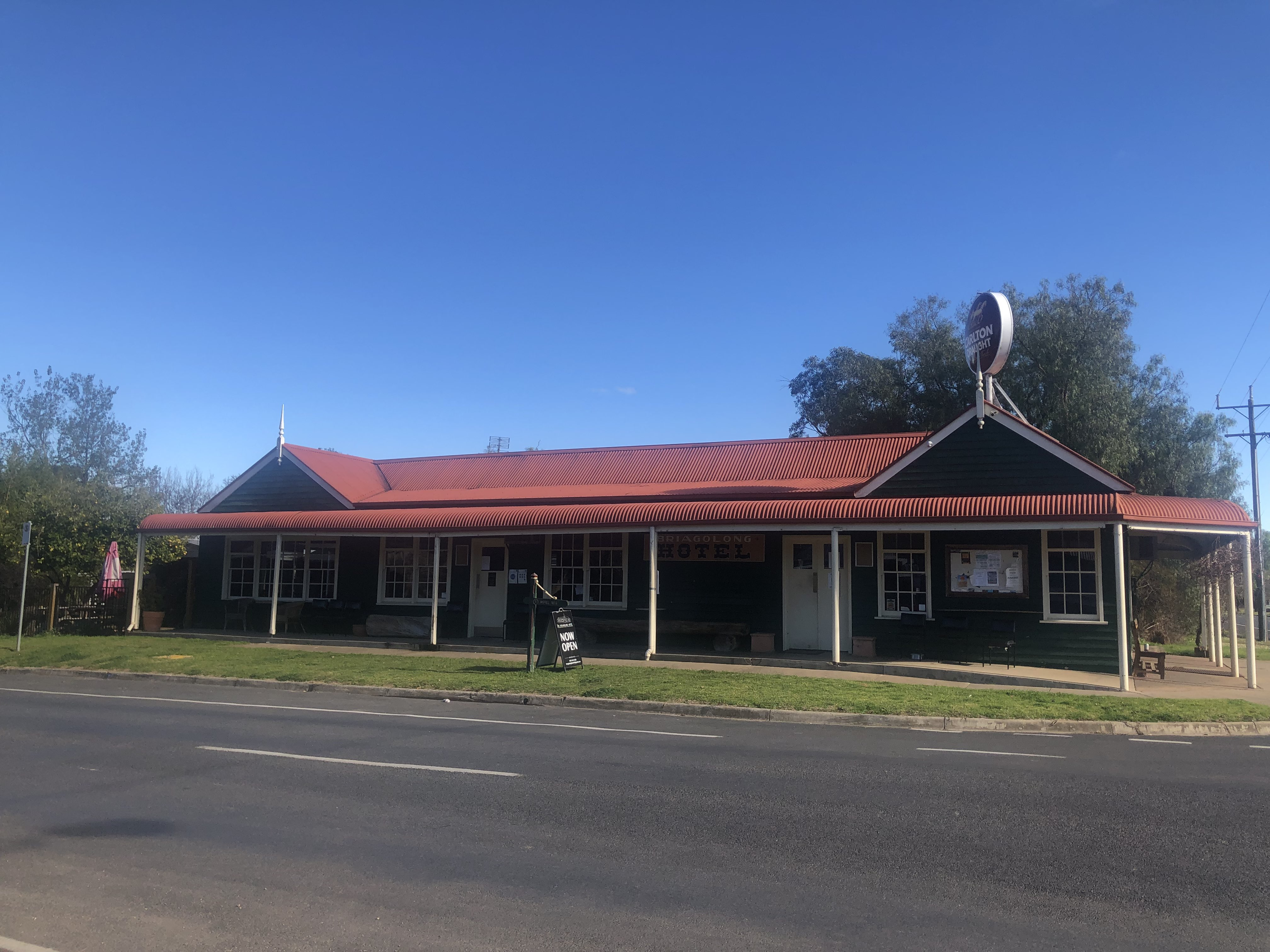
- Briagolong Hotel in July 2021

- Coordinates: 37°50′S 147°04′E
- Country: Australia
- State: Victoria
- LGA: Shire of Wellington
- Location: 238 km (148 mi) E of Melbourne; 32 km (20 mi) N of Sale; 20 km (12 mi) NE of Maffra

Government
  - State electorate: Gippsland East
  - Federal division: Gippsland

Area
  - Total: 166.8 km^{2} (64.4 sq mi)

Population
  - Total: 1,133 (2021 census)
  - Density: 6.793/km^{2} (17.593/sq mi)
- Postcode: 3860

Briagolong is a town in the Australian state of Victoria, located 20 kilometres north of Maffra and some 238 kilometres east of Melbourne, in the Shire of Wellington region of Gippsland. At the 2022 census, Briagolong had a population of 1,133.

== History ==
Briagolong Post Office opened on 1 May 1871.

The Briagolong Hotel, which serves meals and drinks, dates to 1874.

The town's principal industry has been timber, and it supplied red gum paving blocks for the streets of Melbourne, and stringybark for the flooring in Australia House in London.

A railway branch line from Maffra opened in 1889 and was closed in 1952.

Briagolong was the home town of Private Jake Kovco, Australia's first military casualty in the Iraq War. Private Kovco's funeral was held in Briagolong on 2 May 2006, and was attended by Prime Minister John Howard, Defence Minister Brendan Nelson, Defence Force Chief Angus Houston and Army Chief Peter Leahy.

The town's local cricket team (the Saints) were crowned Sale-Maffra Cricket Association 2018/19 season premiers.

== Today ==
In conjunction with neighbouring township Boisdale, Briagolong has an Australian Rules football team in the East Gippsland Football League.

The town's water supply is taken from the Freestone Creek.

Popular tourist areas nearby are the swimming areas on the Freestone Creek at Quarry Reserve (4.5 km north of Briagolong) and Blue Pool (10 km north), both on the Freestone Creek Road.

== Notable people ==
- Jake Kovco, Australia's first military casualty in the Iraq War
- Len Maxwell, Australian rules footballer
- Irving Mosquito, Australian rules footballer

== Links ==
- 1923 - Briagolong FC team photo
