= Len Maxwell (footballer) =

Australian rules footballer, born 1906

Personal information
- Full name: Leonard Josiah Maxwell
- Born: 17 March 1906; Briagolong, Victoria
- Died: 31 January 1982 (aged 75); Torquay, Victoria
- Height: 175 cm (5 ft 9 in)
- Weight: 71 kg (157 lb)

Playing career^{1}
Years	Club	Games (Goals)
1927	Hawthorn	3 (0)
- ^{1} Playing statistics correct to the end of 1927.

Leonard Josiah Maxwell (17 March 1906 – 31 January 1982) was an Australian rules footballer who played with Hawthorn in the Victorian Football League (VFL).
