= Omeo & District Football League =

Australian rules football competition

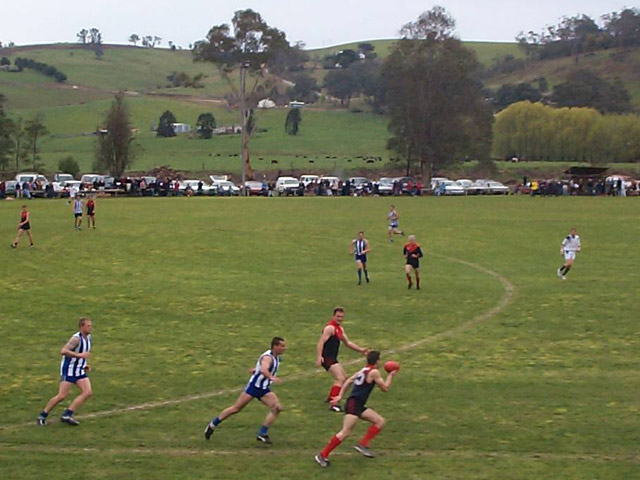
Swifts Creek and Buchan playing off in the 2001 ODFL Grand Final at Buchan

The Omeo District Football Netball League (ODFNL) is an Australian rules football League based in the Omeo Region of East Gippsland, Victoria, Australia. The ODFNL has existed in some form since 1893, and operates under the auspices of the Victorian Country Football League (VCFL). The league is situated in an area with a small population, resulting in the league playing 16-a-side rather than the standard 18-a-side, and not fielding a reserve grade.

Clubs involved in the ODFNL are invited to field a men's senior football team and boys' junior (Under 16) football team, with girls up to 13 also being able to play in the junior football team. Clubs can also compete in a concurrent netball league, with women's senior netball teams at A and B levels, and girls' junior 17-and-under and 12-and-under netball teams; boys are permitted to compete in the netball teams up to 13 years of age.

== History ==
The first recorded football competition in the upper Tambo Valley region, often referred to as the Omeo District, dates back to 1893. Other than short recesses resulting from the two World Wars, some type of official competition has continued uninterrupted from this time. In 1923 the competition was renamed the Omeo District Football League (ODFL), and it has continued with this name until the present day.

Throughout most of its history the ODFL and its precedents has contained teams from the four main towns of the Omeo District, namely Benambra, Ensay, Omeo, and Swifts Creek. Up until around World War I, when the population of the region was significantly higher due to the lingering effects of the gold rushes, a team from the now minor locality of Cassilis (originally known as Long Gully) was also involved in most seasons and experienced considerable success. Records indicate other historical localities from the district also occasionally fielded teams, including Bindi, Glen Wills, Little River, Reedy Creek, and Tambo Crossing. Since 1893 Omeo, or its later incarnation as the merged Omeo-Benambra team, has competed in all but possibly two seasons, while Swifts Creek has never missed a season, making it one of the oldest continuously operating Australian Rules Football or general sporting clubs in the country.

The league was named for Omeo, the largest town and traditionally the administrative centre of the region. The area was commonly referred to as the Omeo District, and existed as the independent local government Shire of Omeo, or Omeo Shire, until it was amalgamated with several other shires into the newly formed Shire of East Gippsland in 1994.

In historical times the region was relatively isolated, with the remote 52 km section of the Omeo Highway (now the Great Alpine Road) between Ensay and Bruthen mainly unsealed and regularly impassable, especially during the winter months. This made the road slow to navigate, especially before readily available motorised transport became common. This was the reason for the historical governmental separation of the region despite its low population, and explained the need for the small isolated football league.

=== Boyle and Mac's Challenge Cup (1893–96) ===
The earliest recorded history of a football competition in the Omeo District was the Boyle and Mac's Challenge Cup, referred to alternatively as the Boyle and Mac Cup, Boyle Mac Challenge Cup, or Boyle Mac trophy. This competition began in 1893, four years before the formation of the Victorian Football League (now Australian Football League), the premier football league in Victoria and Australia. It is unknown exactly why the competition had the Boyle and Mac's title, however the captain of Omeo was named Boyle.

Records indicate that the 1893 trophy was awarded following a series of games between Long Gully, Omeo, and Swifts Creek Football Clubs, with each club playing the others two times for a total of six matches. A newspaper report from early in the season suggests a final match was scheduled, presumably between the top two sides, however the same paper reported at the end of the season that the winner of the cup was decided on the top placed team at the end of the six matches, with no actual final being played.

Swifts Creek defeated Omeo in the final match of the season, placing them two points clear at the top of the ladder with two wins and a draw (for ten points), from Omeo with two wins (eight points), and Long Gully with one win and a draw (six points). The 1893 trophy is engraved on the front with:

BOYLE & MAC'S
CHALLENGE CUP
Won by
SWIFT'S CREEK
1893

with a separate engraving on the back presenting the trophy to the club's secretary. The Boyle and Mac's Challenge Cup ran from 1893 until 1896.

=== Noble Explosives Cup (1897–98) ===
Following the 1896 season the Boyle and Mac's Challenge Cup was disbanded, being replaced with the Noble Explosives Cup. This competition only ran for two seasons, 1897 and 1898, with its two premiers being Omeo and Cassilis.

=== Omeo District Football Association (ODFA) (1899–1907, 1914–21) ===
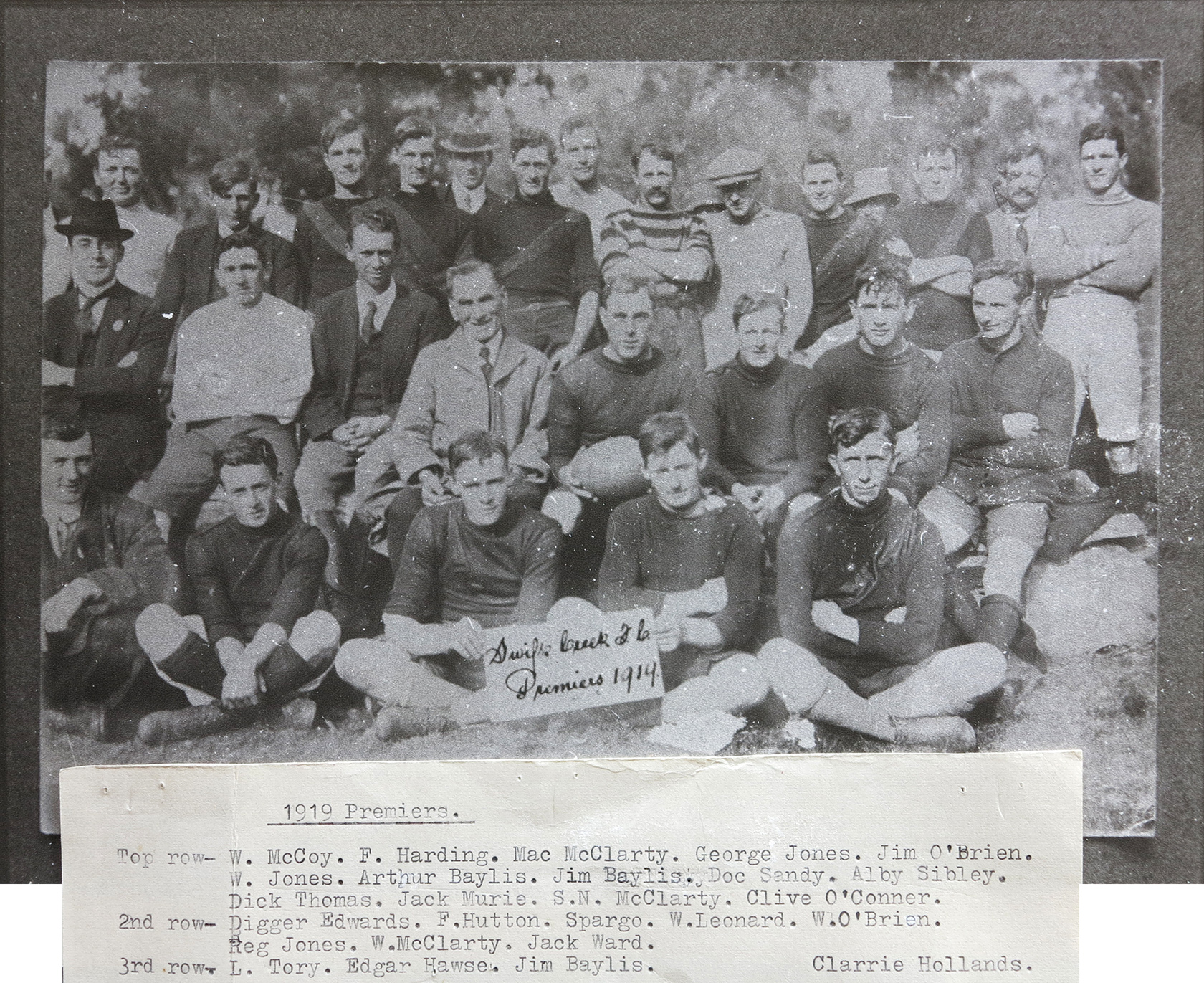
Swifts Creek's 1919 ODFA premiership team; note the variety of club jumper designs, all significantly different from the current design

The Omeo District Football Association (ODFA) was formed in 1899, replacing the Noble Explosives Cup. The competition ran under this name from 1899 to 1907, then from 1914 to 1921. Clubs that competed in the ODFA over this time were Cassilis, Omeo, Benambra, Swifts Creek, and Ensay, although only Omeo played in every season that the ODFA was operational. After a year's absence in 1922, the competition would relaunch in 1923 as the Omeo District Football League. Further discussion is included below on the interaction between the ODFA and the Tambo Valley Football Association during their overlapping years of operation between 1907 and 1921.

=== Tambo Valley Football Association (TVFA) (1907–25) ===
The mainstays of the early football competitions up to the ODFA were Swifts Creek and Omeo, with Long Gully/Cassilis, Benambra, and Ensay also fielding teams in some or most years. In 1907 the competition split into two branches. The ODFA continued as an 'above the gap' competition involving Omeo, Benambra, and Cassilis, while a new 'below the gap' competition, the Tambo Valley Football Association (TVFA), was formed by Swifts Creek, Ensay, and a new team from the small locality at Bindi. At this time roads were poor and transport options limited, making the 70 km between Benambra and Ensay for example very significant, so presumably this split was largely to help with travel as the competition expanded to more clubs over a larger area.

In 1908, after just one year of the split competition, the ODFA temporarily folded, leaving the TVFA as the only competition in the district. In 1909 the short-lived Bindi club was discontinued, and after a year's hiatus Omeo and Cassilis joined Swifts Creek and Ensay in the TVFA competition, taking it back to four of the regular teams from the previous ODFA. Benambra did not field a team again until 1914 when the TVFA/ODFA split was again implemented. For this split competition in 1914 Bindi temporarily reformed to make up numbers in the TVFA, and the dominant Swifts Creek club which had won the last six straight premierships fielded a one-time only second team, Swifts Creek A, which would lead to the unusual situation of Swifts Creek A defeating Swifts Creek in the 1914 TVFA Grand Final.

After just one year of this re-split competition, World War I would then cause both competitions to enter recess from 1915 to 1918. Following the war in 1919 both competitions again recommenced, but Swifts Creek now returned to the ODFA along with Omeo, Benambra, and Cassilis in their last season. The TVFA meanwhile would consist of Ensay and two nearby minor localities, Reedy Creek and Little River. At the end of 1921 the ODFA wound up for the last time, and Omeo and Swifts Creek rejoined Ensay in the TVFA for the 1922 season. The commencement of the rebranded ODFL in 1923 would see Omeo and Swifts Creek again leave the TVFA to take part in that competition, with the TVFA having its last season in 1925 with Ensay, Reedy Creek, and a once only team from Tambo Crossing. After this Ensay would again join Benambra, Omeo, and Swifts Creek in the new ODFL.

=== Omeo District Football League/Omeo and District Football League (ODFL) (1923–2000s) ===
In 1923 the Omeo District Football League (ODFL) was formed to replace the ODFA, and has continued with a variation of that name ever since. Following the termination of the TVFA after the 1925 season, the ODFL competition ran for more than fifty years with a stable four club structure involving the four main Tambo Valley/Omeo District towns, Benambra, Ensay, Omeo, and Swifts Creek.

In 1978 the league first expanded beyond its traditional range, with Bruthen and Buchan being admitted. Following on from this the competition later became more often referred to as the Omeo and District Football League (still abbreviated to ODFL), with the "and" recognising that it now incorporated teams from beyond the original Omeo District. In 1995 one of the four traditional clubs, Ensay, folded due a lack of players. In 1997 the league admitted two more new clubs from beyond its original range, Swan Reach and Lake Tyers. Lake Tyers would only play for two seasons, but in 2004 another outside team, Lindenow South was also admitted.

=== Omeo District Football Netball League (ODFNL) (2000s–present) ===
By the 2000s many clubs were struggling to find sufficient players every week, and the two historic 'above the gap' teams, Benambra and Omeo, would make the difficult decision to merge and form Omeo-Benambra from the 2007 season onwards. By this era most of the football teams in the competition had also already fully affiliated with their associated netball teams, and the competition eventually officially adopted the title of Omeo District Football Netball League (ODFNL).

== Key events in competition history ==
Note: unless otherwise stated, all items refer to senior football teams. Netball and junior teams often, but not always, follow the senior football teams. There are also insufficient available data sources relating to netball and juniors, including when the competitions originated.

- 1893: The first recorded football competition in the Omeo District was formed, called the Boyle and Mac's Challenge Cup, and consisting of Long Gully (Cassilis), Omeo, and Swifts Creek. Swifts Creek won the first 'cup'.
- 1895: Benambra joined the competition.
- 1897: The Noble Explosives Cup replaced the Boyle and Mac's Challenge Cup, which had been disbanded after the 1896 season.
- 1899: After just two years the Noble Explosives Cup was disbanded, being replaced by the Omeo District Football Association (ODFA).
- 1900: Ensay is thought to have joined the competition.
- 1907: The competition split into the ODFA and the Tambo Valley Football Association (TVFA).
- 1908–13: The TVFA was the only active competition after the ODFA ceased to operate.
- 1914: The ODFA reformed, again resulting in a split competition.
- 1915–18: Both the ODFA and TVFA were in recess due to the large number of young men from the district involved in World War I.
- 1919: Both the ODFA and TVFA recommenced competition. Founding club Cassilis (originally Long Gully) played their last season.
- 1921: Last season of the ODFA, again leaving only the TVFA operational.
- 1923: The Omeo District Football League (ODFL) was formed.
- 1925: Last season of the TVFA.
- 1926: Ensay from the TVFA joined Benambra, Omeo, and Swifts Creek to form the stable four team ODFL, which would persist for the next 52 years.
- 1941–44: The league was in recess due to the large number of young men from the district involved in World War II.
- 1978: Bruthen (from the East Gippsland Football League) and Buchan (after an eight-year recess from the Snow Valley Football League) were admitted, extending the league beyond the traditional 'Omeo District' of the upper Tambo Valley for the first time, and taking the number of teams to six.
- 1995: Ensay's last season. In Round 4 Benambra scored 52.24.342 against them. Ensay folded after Round 5 due to being unable to field a team, and the league dropped to five teams. Ensay's record for the season was expunged.
- 1996: Lake Tyers reformed after many years in recess, affiliating with the ODFL for the first time, and competing in 1996–97, returning the league to six teams.
- 1997: Swan Reach were admitted from the Riviera Football League after spending a year in recess, making a seven team competition.
- 1997: Lake Tyers were ejected from the league following conflicts with other clubs, after having made the 1997 Grand Final, returning the league to six teams.
- 2000s: Most towns fully affiliated their long associated football and netball clubs, and the league officially adopted the title Omeo District Football Netball League (ODFNL).
- 2004: Lindenow South were admitted after the Riviera Football League folded, making seven teams, and introducing a bye.
- 2007: Benambra and Omeo merged to form Omeo-Benambra, returning the league to six teams.
- 2010: Competition rules were modified to allow girls up to 13 to play junior boys' football, and boys up to 13 to play junior girls' netball.
- 2010s: A second netball competition, "B" grade, was implemented to allow more women to take part.
- 2020: The season was cancelled for the first time in 75 years due to the COVID-19 pandemic, which was particularly bad in Victoria during the second half of the year.
- 2021: After several interruptions throughout the year, the season was officially abandoned after the first week of finals due to the COVID-19 pandemic. The remaining three teams in Senior Football were Lindenow South, Swifts Creek, and Omeo-Benambra.

== Clubs ==
Note that details given in this section refer to senior football teams. In terms of colours and jumper designs, junior football teams generally follow the same design as senior teams. Netball teams share much the same colour combination, typically with a skirt of one of the primary team colours and a top of the other colour. Years in the league for other teams are also mainly in line with the club's senior football, although clubs are not always able to field all teams in any given year.

=== Locations ===
Locations of the Omeo & District FNL clubs

=== Current ===
Club	Colours	Nickname	Home ground	Former League	Est.	Years in Competition	ODFNL Senior Premierships	
Club	Colours	Nickname	Home ground	Former League	Est.	Years in Competition	Total	Years
Bruthen		Bulldogs	Bruthen Rec. Reserve, Bruthen	EGFL	1920	1978–	10	1979, 1984, 1985, 1988, 1989, 2003, 2017, 2018, 2019, 2026
Buchan		Cavemen	Buchan Rec. Reserve, Buchan	GFL	1920s	1978–	5	1983, 1987, 1998, 2004, 2005
Lindenow South		Swampies (Swamp Hawks)	Lindenow South Rec. Reserve, Lindenow South	RFL	1902	2004–	5	2012, 2013, 2015, 2016, 2022
Omeo–Benambra		Ranges (Alpine Ranges)	Omeo Recreation Reserve, Omeo	–	2007	2007–	3	2007, 2024, 2025
Swifts Creek		Demons	Swifts Creek Rec. Reserve, Swifts Creek	TVFA	1890s	1893–	29	1893, 1908, 1909, 1910, 1911, 1912, 1913, 1914, 1919, 1920, 1925, 1926, 1931, 1935, 1938, 1945, 1959, 1978, 1980, 1981, 1982, 1993, 1997, 2001, 2002, 2008, 2010, 2011, 2023

* Note that the jumper design shown is a representation of the club's most recent jumper design. Most designs have been changed over the years, some quite significantly.

=== In recess for 2026 ===
Club	Colours	Nickname	Home ground	Former League	Est.	Years in Competition	ODFNL Senior Premierships	
Club	Colours	Nickname	Home ground	Former League	Est.	Years in Competition	Total	Years
Swan Reach		Swans	Swan Reach Rec. Reserve, Swan Reach	RFL	1920s	1997–	3	1999, 2009, 2014

=== Previous ===
Club	Colours	Nickname	Home ground	Former League	Est.	Years in Competition	ODFNL Senior Premierships		Fate
Club	Colours	Nickname	Home ground	Former League	Est.	Years in Competition	Total	Years	Fate
Benambra		Bloods	Benambra Memorial Recreation Reserve, Benambra	TVFA	1895	1895–2006	20	1900, 1927, 1928, 1930, 1932, 1939, 1953, 1955, 1956, 1957, 1958, 1961, 1968, 1969, 1973, 1974, 1990, 1994, 2000, 2006	Merged with Omeo in 2007 to form Omeo-Benambra
Bindi				–		1907–1908, 1914	0	–	Folded
Cassilis (Long Gully 1893-96)			Long Gully Oval	–		1893–1919	8	1894, 1895, 1896, 1898, 1905, 1906, 1907, 1914	Folded
Ensay		Eagles	Ensay Recreation Reserve, Ensay	TVFA	1900s	1900–1995	10	1907, 1919, 1920, 1934, 1936, 1940, 1946, 1947, 1950, 1960	Folded
Glen Wills				–		1894–1895	0	–	Folded
Lake Tyers		Sea Eagles	Lake Tyers Oval, Toorloo Arm	EGFL	1930	1996–1997	0	–	Voted out of league following 1997 season
Little River				–		1919–1921	1	1921	Merged with Ensay in 1922
Omeo		Maroons	Omeo Recreation Reserve, Omeo	TVFA	1888	1893–2006	34	1897, 1899, 1901, 1903, 1904, 1921, 1922, 1923, 1924, 1929, 1933, 1937, 1948, 1949, 1951, 1952, 1954, 1962, 1963, 1964, 1965, 1966, 1967, 1970, 1971, 1972, 1975, 1976, 1977, 1986, 1991, 1992, 1995, 1996	Merged with Benambra in 2007 to form Omeo-Benambra
Reedy Creek				–		1919–1921, 1925	0	–	Merged with Ensay in 1926
Tambo Crossing				–		1925	0	–	Folded

* Note that the jumper design shown is a representation of the club's final known jumper design. Where the design is unknown, a representation of the club colours, if known, is displayed instead.

== Premierships ==
=== Senior football ===
==== As ODFL/ODFNL ====
Season	Premier	Runner Up	Score	Margin
2026	Bruthen	Omeo-Benambra	14.12 (96) – 4.11 (35)	61
2025	Omeo-Benambra	Swan Reach	9.11 (65) – 9.9 (63)	2
2024	Omeo-Benambra	Swifts Creek	16.9 (105) – 4.5 (29)	76
2023	Swifts Creek	Omeo-Benambra	11.6 (72) – 7.8 (50)	22
2022	Lindenow South	Swifts Creek	15.12 (102) – 10.7 (67)	35
2021	Abandoned (COVID-19)			
2020	No competition (COVID-19)			
2019	Bruthen	Omeo-Benambra	10.12 (72) – 8.11 (59)	13
2018	Bruthen	Swifts Creek	14.11 (95) – 10.9 (69)	26
2017	Bruthen	Lindenow South	18.11 (119) – 14.16 (100)	19
2016	Lindenow South	Swan Reach	19.22 (136) – 9.7 (61)	75
2015	Lindenow South	Buchan	22.13 (145) – 13.20 (98)	47
2014	Swan Reach	Omeo-Benambra	28.24 (192) – 12.13 (85)	107
2013	Lindenow South	Swifts Creek	19.10 (124) – 12.17 (89)	35
2012	Lindenow South	Swifts Creek	20.15 (135) – 10.10 (70)	65
2011	Swifts Creek	Lindenow South	17.17 (119) – 11.15 (81)	38
2010	Swifts Creek	Bruthen	22.12 (144) – 13.10 (88)	56
2009	Swan Reach	Swifts Creek	25.19 (169) – 21.7 (133)	36
2008	Swifts Creek	Bruthen	16.12 (108) – 13.9 (87)	21
2007	Omeo-Benambra	Swan Reach	24.12 (156) – 13.8 (86)	70
2006	Benambra	Swifts Creek	19.16 (130) – 9.9 (63)	67
	Benambra	Swifts Creek	15.11 (101) – 16.5 (101)	Draw
2005	Buchan	Omeo	18 12 (120) – 14.13 (97)	23
2004	Buchan	Omeo	14.10 (94) – 9.15 (69)	25
2003	Bruthen	Swan Reach	17.15 (117) – 15.12 (102)	15
2002	Swifts Creek	Omeo	16.12 (108) – 11.16 (82)	26
2001	Swifts Creek	Buchan	16.12 (108) – 10.12 (72)	36
2000	Benambra	Omeo	10.17 (77) – 11.9 (75)	2
1999	Swan Reach	Bruthen	25.15 (165) – 5.10 (40)	125
1998	Buchan	Benambra	19.8 (122) – 11.3 (69)	53
1997	Swifts Creek	Lake Tyers	28.14 (182) – 13.9 (87)	95
1996	Omeo	Swifts Creek	10.15 (75) – 9.6 (60)	15
1995	Omeo	Swifts Creek	18.5 (113) – 10.9 (69)	44
1994	Benambra	Swifts Creek	20.19 (139) – 14.12 (96)	43
1993	Swifts Creek	Bruthen	20.12 (132) – 15.7 (97)	35
1992	Omeo	Swifts Creek	12.12 (84) – 9.18 (72)	12
1991	Omeo	Benambra	18.18 (126) – 17.12 (114)	12
1990	Benambra	Buchan	25.17 (167) – 8.2 (50)	117
1989	Bruthen	Benambra	16.18 (114) – 6.11 (47)	67
1988	Bruthen	Benambra	18.18 (126) – 11.18 (84)	44
1987	Buchan	Bruthen	20.14 (134) – 18.16 (124)	10
1986	Omeo	Bruthen	13.8 (86) – 12.9 (81)	5
1985	Bruthen	Omeo	24.14 (158) – 12.16 (88)	70
1984	Bruthen	Buchan	23.14 (152) – 11.9 (75)	77
1983	Buchan	Benambra	14.14 (98) – 14.12 (96)	2
1982	Swifts Creek	Benambra	18.7 (115) – 15.17 (107)	8
1981	Swifts Creek	Bruthen	24.17 (161) – 3.7 (25)	136
1980	Swifts Creek	Buchan	18.14 (122) – 10.10 (70)	52
1979	Bruthen	Swifts Creek	18.12 (120) – 15.18 (108)	12
1978	Swifts Creek	Omeo	16.10 (106) – 9.19 (73)	33
1977	Omeo	Swifts Creek	21.9 (135) – 17.18 (120)	15
1976	Omeo	Benambra	17.14 (116) – 6.11 (47)	69
1975	Omeo	Benambra	17.20 (122) – 11.8 (74)	48
1974	Benambra	Swifts Creek	16.12 (108) – 14.17 (101)	7
1973	Benambra	Omeo	10.8 (68) – 10.4 (64)	4
1972	Omeo	Ensay	11.18 (84) – 12.8 (80)	4
1971	Omeo	Swifts Creek	17.17 (119) – 12.8 (80)	39
1970	Omeo	Swifts Creek	16.17 (113) – 3.14 (32)	81
1969	Benambra	Omeo	13.22 (100) – 6.14 (50)	50
1968	Benambra	Omeo		
1967	Omeo	Benambra		
1966	Omeo	Benambra		
1965	Omeo	Ensay		
1964	Omeo	Benambra		
1963	Omeo	Benambra		
1962	Omeo	Benambra		
1961	Benambra	Swifts Creek		
1960	Ensay	Benambra		
1959	Swifts Creek	Benambra		
1958	Benambra	Ensay		
1957	Benambra	Swifts Creek		
1956	Benambra	Swifts Creek		
1955	Benambra	Swifts Creek		
1954	Omeo	Benambra	9.12 (66) – 10.5 (65)	1
1953	Benambra	Omeo	9.14 (68) – 6.11 (47)	21
1952	Omeo	Ensay	8.17 (65) – 6.13 (49)	16
1951	Omeo	Swifts Creek	9.13 (67) – 8.12 (60)	7
1950	Ensay	Omeo		
1949	Omeo	Ensay	9.17 (71) – 8.6 (54)	17
1948	Omeo	Swifts Creek	8.12 (60) – 8.10 (58)	2
1947	Ensay	Omeo		
1946	Ensay	Omeo	20.11 (131) – 11.18 (84)	47
1945	Swifts Creek	Ensay		
1944	No competition (World War II)			
1943	No competition (World War II)			
1942	No competition (World War II)			
1941	No competition (World War II)			
1940	Ensay	Omeo	11.7(73) – 9.9 (63)	10
1939	Benambra	Swifts Creek		
1938	Swifts Creek	Benambra		
1937	Omeo	Ensay	10.18 (78) – 10.8 (68)	10
1936	Ensay	Omeo		
1935	Swifts Creek	Benambra		
1934	Ensay	Swifts Creek		
1933	Omeo	Ensay	12.18 (90) – 12.17 (89)	1
1932	Benambra	Ensay		
1931	Swifts Creek	Omeo		
1930	Benambra	Swifts Creek		
1929	Omeo	Benambra	6.10 (46) – 5.14 (44)	2
1928	Benambra	Omeo		
1927	Benambra	Swifts Creek		
1926	Swifts Creek	Omeo	10.5 (65) – 5.12 (42)	23
1925	Swifts Creek	Omeo	5.9 (39) – 5.5 (35)	4
1924	Omeo	Swifts Creek	6.12 (48) – 6.4 (40)	8
1923	Omeo	Swifts Creek	3.11 (29) – 3.7 (25)	4

==== Pre-ODFL ====
Season	Premier*	Runner Up	Score	Margin
1922	Omeo (TVFA)	Swifts Creek	3.9 (27) – 1.8 (14)	13
1921	Omeo (ODFA)			
	Little River (TVFA)			
1920	Swifts Creek (ODFA)			
	Ensay (TVFA)	Reedy Creek	5.11 (41) – 3.10 (28)	13
1919	Swifts Creek (ODFA)			
	Ensay (TVFA)			
1918	No competition (World War I)			
1917	No competition (World War I)			
1916	No competition (World War I)			
1915	No competition (World War I)			
1914	Cassilis (ODFA)			
	Swifts Creek A (TVFA)	Swifts Creek	8.7 (55) – 6.3 (39)	16
1913	Swifts Creek (TVFA)	Cassilis	5.11 (41) – 1.2 (8)	33
1912	Swifts Creek (TVFA)			
1911	Swifts Creek (TVFA)			
1910	Swifts Creek (TVFA)			
1909	Swifts Creek (TVFA)			
1908	Swifts Creek (TVFA)			
1907	Cassilis (ODFA)			
	Ensay (TVFA)			
1906	Cassilis (ODFA)	Omeo		
1905	Cassilis (ODFA)			
1904	Omeo (ODFA)	Cassilis	8.11 (59) – 2.7 (19)	40
1903	Omeo (ODFA)	Cassilis	3.3 (21) – 2.6 (18)	3
1902	Unknown (ODFA)			
1901	Omeo (ODFA)			
1900	Benambra (ODFA)			
1899	Omeo (ODFA)			
1898	Cassilis (NEC)	Omeo		
1897	Omeo (NEC)	Cassilis	2.7 (19) – 1.2 (8)	11
1896	Long Gully (BMC)			
1895	Long Gully (BMC)			
1894	Long Gully (BMC)			
1893	Swifts Creek (BMC)	Omeo		

* Key: BMC – Boyle and Mac's Challenge Cup; NEC – Noble Explosives Cup; ODFA – Omeo District Football Association; TVFA – Tambo Valley Football Association.

=== Junior football (Under 16) ===
Junior football is open to all boys under sixteen years of age on the first of January each year. Due to the low population and the number of players needed for football teams this is the only junior competition available, raising the unusual challenge that teenagers as old as sixteen may be playing against children as young as six. During the 2000s rules were modified to allow girls up to the age of 13 years to also take part in this competition.

Season	Premier	Runner Up	Score	Margin
2026	Omeo-Benambra	Lindenow South	8.11 (59) – 5.3 (33)	26
2025	Lindenow South	Omeo-Benambra	6.3 (39) – 5.6 (36)	3
2024	Lindenow South	Omeo-Benambra	6.11 (47) – 4.6 (30)	17
2023	Buchan	Lindenow South	15.3 (93) – 7.6 (48)	45
2022	Lindenow South	Buchan	14.11 (95) – 6.5 (41)	54
2021	Abandoned (COVID-19)			
2020	No competition (COVID-19)			
2019	Lindenow South	Bruthen	18.18 (126) – 3.4 (22)	104
2018	Omeo-Benambra	Swan Reach	11.17 (83) – 5.6 (36)	47
2017	Swan Reach	Omeo-Benambra	8.13 (61) – 4.6 (30)	31
2016	Swan Reach	Omeo-Benambra	11.19 (85) – 5.3 (33)	52
2015	Bruthen	Buchan	10.12 (72) – 6.8 (44)	28
2014	Bruthen	Omeo-Benambra	11.13 (79) – 11.9 (75)	4
2013	Buchan	Swan Reach	17.10 (112) – 13.7 (85)	27
2012	Buchan	Swan Reach	12.12 (84) – 5.9 (39)	45
2011	Omeo-Benambra	Swifts Creek	12.8 (80) – 8.10 (58)	22
2010	Bruthen	Swifts Creek	13.8 (86) – 3.3 (21)	65
2009	Bruthen	Omeo-Benambra	8.13 (61) – 7.5 (47)	14
2008		Bruthen		
2007	Bruthen			
2006				
2005				
2004				
2003				
2002	Omeo	Swifts Creek	13.18 (96) – 7.7 (49)	47
2001				
2000				
1999				
1998				
1997	Bruthen			
1996	Bruthen			
1995	Swifts Creek			
1994	Swifts Creek			
1993	Swifts Creek	Benambra		70
1992	Benambra			
1991	Bruthen			
1990	Buchan			
1989	Omeo			
1988	Omeo			
1987	Bruthen			
1986	Bruthen			
1985	Bruthen			
1984	Bruthen	Swifts Creek		
1983	Ensay			
1982	Swifts Creek	Ensay		23
1981	Bruthen	Swifts Creek	15.12 (102) – 3.0 (18)	84
1980	Buchan	Bruthen		72
1979	Bruthen	Buchan	12.17 (89) – 5.1 (31)	58
1978	Buchan	Swifts Creek		
1977	Swifts Creek			
1976	Swifts Creek			
1975	Swifts Creek			
1974	Ensay			
1973	Omeo			
1972	Omeo			
1971	Omeo			
1970	Ensay			
1969	Omeo			
1968	Swifts Creek			
1967	Omeo			

=== Senior netball ===
The senior netball competition is for women and older teenage girls. Records for the netball competitions are harder to obtain and less complete than for football, so it is unclear exactly when the netball competitions commenced. Some photographic records from the early 1950s show women's "basketball" teams, so it may have begun post-World War II. Although named 'basketball' on the photos, these were most likely netball teams as the name 'netball' was not officially adopted in Australia until 1970, with the sport officially called "women's basketball" before this, making it hard to distinguish between the two sports.

A single competition ran until the 2010s, when a second "B" grade was added due to demand for more women to participate. The original single team was then renamed as "A" grade. Clubs have gradually added a second side so that as of 2022 all clubs fielded both A and B grade teams, however, often some players will be required to play in both teams to fill numbers, or junior players will be used to make up sides.

"A" Grade

Season	Premier	Runner Up	Score	Margin
2026	Omeo-Benambra	Swifts Creek	51 – 30	21
2025	Omeo-Benambra	Swan Reach	65 – 30	35
2024	Omeo-Benambra	Swan Reach	41 – 31	10
2023	Bruthen	Swan Reach	44 – 43	1
2022	Lindenow South	Bruthen	34 – 33	1
2021	Abandoned (COVID-19)			
2020	No competition (COVID-19)			
2019	Lindenow South	Buchan	55 – 37	18
2018	Bruthen	Lindenow South	35 – 31	4
2017	Bruthen	Buchan	47 – 27	20
2016	Omeo-Benambra	Bruthen	49 – 25	24
2015	Swan Reach	Bruthen	39 – 36	3
2014	Swan Reach	Omeo-Benambra	53 – 45	8
2013	Omeo-Benambra	Swan Reach		3
2012	Omeo-Benambra	Swifts Creek		
2011	Omeo-Benambra	Buchan	28 – 19	9
2010	Omeo-Benambra			
2009				
2008				
2007	Omeo-Benambra			
2006				
2005				
2004	Omeo			
2003				
2002	Swifts Creek	Omeo		3
2001	Swifts Creek			
2000	Swifts Creek	Bruthen		

"B" Grade

Season	Premier	Runner Up	Score	Margin
2026	Bruthen	Omeo-Benambra	33 – 31	2
2025	Swan Reach	Omeo-Benambra	29 – 28	1
2024	Bruthen	Swan Reach	37 – 17	20
2023	Bruthen	Omeo-Benambra	25 – 22	3
2022	Lindenow South	Buchan	30 – 18	12
2021	Abandoned (COVID-19)			
2020	No competition (COVID-19)			
2019	Lindenow South	Buchan	26 – 11	15
2018	Lindenow South	Bruthen	27 – 23	4

=== Junior netball (17-and-under) ===
Junior netball is open to all female players seventeen years of age and under as of the first of January each year. Prior to 2019 it was an Under 16 competition, open to girls under sixteen years of age as of the first of January. While potentially any juniors can play in these teams, in practical terms girls under twelve will generally only play in the 12-and-under team. Junior boys 13 years and under may also participate in the netball teams.

Season	Premier	Runner Up	Score	Margin
2026	Bruthen	Lindenow South	31 – 25	6
2025	Swan Reach	Bruthen	35 – 22	13
2024	Bruthen	Swan Reach	30 – 15	15
2023	Buchan	Bruthen	36 – 20	16
2022	Buchan	Bruthen	38 – 35	3
2021	Abandoned (COVID-19)			
2020	No competition (COVID-19)			
2019	Buchan	Lindenow South	29 – 26	3
2018	Lindenow South	Swifts Creek	27 – 26	1
2017	Swifts Creek	Bruthen	32 – 29	3
2016	Swan Reach	Swifts Creek	30 – 24	6
2015	Swan Reach	Omeo	15 – 13	2
2014	Omeo	Swifts Creek	21 – 9	12
2013	Buchan	Omeo-Benambra		
2012	Swifts Creek			
2011	Swifts Creek	Bruthen	23 – 21	2
2010	Swifts Creek			
2009	Swifts Creek	Omeo	23 – 20	3

=== 12-and-under netball ===
Junior 12-and-under netball (formerly 'Midget netball') is open to players twelve years of age and under as of the first of January of the current year; while it is primarily a female sport, boys may also compete. Prior to 2019 it was open to players attending primary school, effectively making it approximately an under eleven competition. Finals are not played in 12 and under netball; the team that finishes at the top of the ladder at the end of the regular season is regarded as the premier team.

Season	Premier	Runner Up
2022	Swifts Creek	Bruthen
2021*	Swifts Creek	
2020	No competition (COVID-19)	
2019	Swifts Creek	Omeo-Benambra
2018	Omeo-Benambra	Swifts Creek
2017	Buchan	Swifts Creek
2011	Swifts Creek	

* Although the 2021 season finals were abandoned for all other groups due to COVID-19, as 12-&-under do not play finals, a premier was still able to be declared.

== Senior football final ladders ==
=== 2010 Ladder ===
Omeo DFL	Wins	Byes	Losses	Draws	For	Against	%	Pts	Final	Team	G	B	Pts	Team	G	B	Pts
Swan Reach	11	0	4	0	1734	1341	129.31%	44	1st Semi	Swifts Creek	31	11	197	Lindenow South	11	9	75
Bruthen	11	0	4	0	1653	1322	125.04%	44	2nd Semi	Bruthen	14	8	92	Swan Reach	6	10	46
Swifts Creek	10	0	5	0	1823	1194	152.68%	40	Preliminary	Swifts Creek	18	13	121	Swan Reach	12	11	83
Lindenow South	7	0	8	0	1249	1311	95.27%	28	Grand	Swifts Creek	22	12	144	Bruthen	13	10	88
Omeo Benambra	3	0	12	0	1288	1779	72.40%	12									
Buchan	3	0	12	0	1191	1991	59.82%	12									

=== 2011 Ladder ===
Omeo DFL	Wins	Byes	Losses	Draws	For	Against	%	Pts	Final	Team	G	B	Pts	Team	G	B	Pts
Lindenow South	15	0	0	0	2091	1240	168.63%	60	1st Semi	Swan Reach	19	13	127	Bruthen	10	25	85
Swifts Creek	11	0	4	0	2155	1433	150.38%	44	2nd Semi	Lindenow South	17	7	109	Swifts Creek	16	8	104
Bruthen	8	0	7	0	1813	1848	98.11%	32	Preliminary	Swifts Creek	33	13	211	Swan Reach	15	10	100
Swan Reach	6	0	9	0	1825	1764	103.46%	24	Grand	Swifts Creek	17	17	119	Lindenow South	11	15	81
Omeo Benambra	4	0	11	0	1410	1781	79.17%	16									
Buchan	1	0	14	0	1054	2282	46.19%	4									

=== 2012 Ladder ===
Omeo DFL	Wins	Byes	Losses	Draws	For	Against	%	Pts	Final	Team	G	B	Pts	Team	G	B	Pts
Swifts Creek	13	0	2	0	1987	1177	168.82%	52	1st Semi	Omeo Benambra	22	22	154	Bruthen	10	6	66
Lindenow South	11	0	4	0	1954	1508	129.58%	44	2nd Semi	Swifts Creek	20	19	139	Lindenow South	20	11	131
Omeo Benambra	8	0	7	0	1886	1387	135.98%	32	Preliminary	Lindenow South	16	11	107	Omeo Benambra	13	15	93
Bruthen	7	0	8	0	1811	1589	113.97%	28	Grand	Lindenow South	20	15	135	Swifts Creek	10	10	70
Swan Reach	5	0	10	0	1682	1614	104.21%	20									
Buchan	1	0	14	0	892	2937	30.37%	4									

=== 2013 Ladder ===
Omeo DFL	Wins	Byes	Losses	Draws	For	Against	%	Pts	Final	Team	G	B	Pts	Team	G	B	Pts
Omeo Benambra	12	0	3	0	2072	1150	180.17%	48	1st Semi	Swifts Creek	23	19	157	Buchan	2	9	21
Lindenow South	11	0	4	0	2314	948	244.09%	44	2nd Semi	Lindenow South	20	12	132	Omeo Benambra	10	9	69
Swifts Creek	11	0	4	0	1927	1099	175.34%	44	Preliminary	Swifts Creek	18	10	118	Omeo Benambra	15	15	105
Buchan	7	0	8	0	1355	1833	73.92%	28	Grand	Lindenow South	19	10	124	Swifts Creek	12	17	89
Swan Reach	3	0	12	0	1153	2171	53.11%	12									
Bruthen	1	0	14	0	1020	2640	38.64%	4									

=== 2014 Ladder ===
Omeo DFL	Wins	Byes	Losses	Draws	For	Against	%	Pts	Final	Team	G	B	Pts	Team	G	B	Pts
Swan Reach	11	0	4	0	1828	1450	126.07%	44	1st Semi	Buchan	17	19	121	Bruthen	12	14	86
Omeo Benambra	10	0	5	0	1566	1223	128.05%	40	2nd Semi	Swan Reach	23	22	160	Omeo-Benambra	10	8	68
Buchan	8	0	7	0	1645	1469	111.98%	32	Preliminary	Omeo-Benambra	15	8	98	Buchan*	17	15	117
Bruthen	6	0	9	0	1464	1537	95.25%	24	Grand	Swan Reach	28	24	192	Omeo-Benambra	12	13	85
Lindenow South	5	0	10	0	1618	1674	96.65%	20									
Swifts Creek	5	0	10	0	1194	1962	60.86%	20									

- Buchan were disqualified for playing an ineligible player

=== 2015 Ladder ===
Omeo DFL	Wins	Byes	Losses	Draws	For	Against	%	Pts	Final	Team	G	B	Pts	Team	G	B	Pts
Buchan	14	0	1	0	2562	1041	246.11%	56	1st Semi	Swifts Creek	10	5	65	Bruthen	7	11	53
Lindenow South	12	0	3	0	2182	1433	152.27%	48	2nd Semi	Lindenow South	20	25	145	Buchan	13	14	92
Bruthen	10	0	5	0	2147	1255	171.08%	40	Preliminary	Buchan	34	19	223	Swifts Creek	0	6	6
Swifts Creek	4	0	11	0	1297	2226	58.27%	16	Grand	Lindenow South	22	13	145	Buchan	13	20	98
Omeo Benambra	3	0	12	0	1122	1968	57.01%	12									
Swan Reach	2	0	13	0	1078	2465	43.73%	8									
