= East Gippsland Football League =

Australian rules league

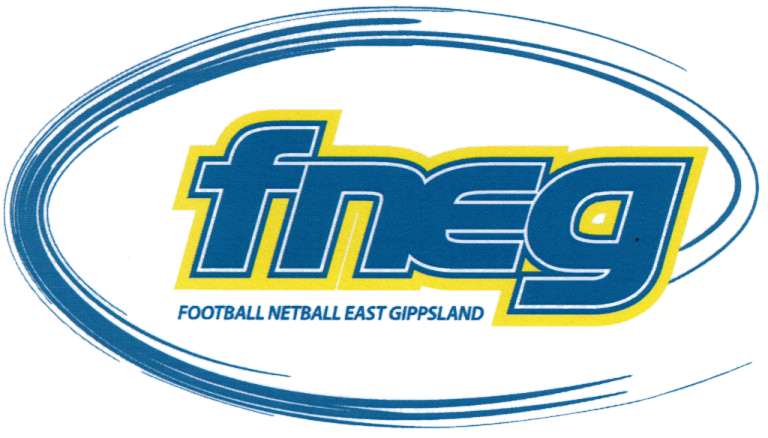
- Sport: Australian rules football
- First season: 1974
- No. of teams: 8
- Country: Australia
- Most recent champion: Lindenow (9)
- Most titles: Orbost (9) Lindenow (9)
- Website: East Gippsland Football League Official Website

The East Gippsland Football League is an Australian rules football League in the East Gippsland region of Victoria, Australia.

== History ==
The East Gippsland FL in its present incarnation began in 1974 with the merger of the Gippsland Football League and the Bairnsdale District Football League. The league has had a number of clubs fold, merge, leave and return over its history, due partly to changing economic circumstances in the area, with areas such as Orbost losing large amounts of their population.

At one stage in the 1980s, the league divided its clubs into two divisions, due to a desire to avoid weekly 40-goal drubbings for the weaker clubs. In 1984 the league had two divisions of five clubs each, both divisions having a club with a bye every week, this move enabling the league to save costs on umpiring.

However, in 1985 Wy Yung got promoted to first division, so the league then had six and four. The second division broke away in 1986 to form the Riviera Football League, together with some clubs who had left the North Gippsland Football League. After the Riviera FL disbanded in 2004, Paynesville was the only East Gippsland member club to return to the EGFL, with West Bairnsdale having folded in the interim, and Lindenow South and Swan Reach instead opting to join the Omeo & District Football League.

In 2011, the league dropped back to six clubs, with Bairnsdale returning to the Gippsland Football League. In 2012 season the league grew to again feature 7 clubs, with Stratford announcing that they would leave the North Gippsland Football League and join the EGFL. Boisdale-Briagolong followed suit in 2015, bringing the league to eight clubs.

== Clubs ==
=== Locations ===
Locations of the East Gippsland FL clubs

=== Current ===
Club	Colours	Nickname	Home Ground	Former League	Est.	Years in EGFL	FNEG Senior Premierships	
Club	Colours	Nickname	Home Ground	Former League	Est.	Years in EGFL	Total	Years
Boisdale Briagolong		Bombers	Boisdale Recreation Reserve, Boisdale	NGFNL	1982	2015–	1	2024
Lakes Entrance		Seagulls	Lakes Entrance Recreation Reserve, Lakes Entrance	GFL	1891	1974–	4	1988, 1994, 1995, 2003
Lindenow		Cats	Lindenow Recreation Reserve, Lindenow	GFL	c.1900s	1974–	9	1980, 1986, 1989, 1991, 2011, 2016, 2017, 2019, 2026
Lucknow		Magpies	Lucknow Recreation Reserve, Lucknow	BDFL	1951	1974–	3	1993, 1997, 2012
Orbost-Snowy Rovers		Blues	Lochiel Street Reserve, Orbost	–	2003	2003–	0	-
Paynesville		Gulls	AJ Freeman Reserve, Paynesville	BDFL, RFL	c.1920	1974–1985, 2004–	2	Div 2: 1984, Div 1: 2013
Stratford		Swans	Stratford Recreation Reserve, Stratford	NGFNL	c.1900	2012—	3	2014, 2018, 2022
Wy Yung		Tigers	Bullumwaal Road Recreation Reserve, Wy Yung	BDFL	c.1920	1974-	6	1992, 2005, 2008, 2015, 2023, 2025

=== Previous ===
Club	Colours	Nickname	Home Ground	Former League	Est.	Years in EGFL	FNEG Senior Premierships		Fate
Club	Colours	Nickname	Home Ground	Former League	Est.	Years in EGFL	Total	Years	Fate
Bairnsdale		Redlegs	Bairnsdale City Oval, Bairnsdale	GL	c.1900	1999–2010	8	2000, 2001, 2002, 2004, 2006, 2007, 2009, 2010	Moved to Gippsland League in 2011
Bruthen		Bulldogs	Bruthen Recreation Reserve, Bruthen	GFL	c.1920	1974–1977	0	-	Moved to Omeo District FL in 1978
Lindenow South		Swampies	Lindenow South Recreation Reserve, Lindenow South	BDFL	1902	1974–1985	1	Div 2: 1985	Formed Riviera FL in 1986
Orbost		Busters	Lochiel Street Reserve, Orbost	GFL	1890s	1974–2002	9	1974, 1975, 1979, 1981, 1987, 1990, 1996, 1998, 1999	Merged with Snowy Rovers to form Orbost-Snowy Rovers in 2003
Snowy Rovers		Rovers	Orbost Recreation Reserve, Orbost	GFL	1970	1974–2002	7	1976, 1977, 1978, 1982, 1983, 1984, 1985	Merged with Orbost to form Orbost-Snowy Rovers in 2003
Swan Reach		Swans	Swan Reach Recreation Reserve, Swan Reach	BDFL	c.1920	1974–1985	0	-	Formed Riviera FL in 1986
West Bairnsdale		Hawks	West Bairnsdale Oval, Bairnsdale	BDFL	1963	1974–1985	0	-	Formed Riviera FL in 1986

== League Football Records ==
Notable Records
Record		Details	Year
Highest Score	343	Wy Yung 53.25.343 v Paynesville 3.1.19	2005
Most Goals in a Match	22	Garry Lee - Lucknow v Swan Reach	1983
Most Goals in a Season	133 Goals	Stephen Schaeche (Wy Yung)	1992
Most Goals in a Grand Final	13 Goals	Tim Bull (Lucknow)	1997
Most Consecutive Premierships	4	Snowy Rovers	1982–1985
Most Consecutive Wins	29 Wins	Bairnsdale	2000-2001

== Leading Goal Kickers ==
Year	Player	H&A goals	Finals goals	Total Goals
1974	Robert Marthick (Orbost)	83	0	83
1975	Graeme Joiner (Snowy Rovers)	105	0	105
1976	Daryl Wren (Wy Yung)	115	1	116
1977	Brian McDonald (Snowy Rovers)	115	2	117
1978	Gary Henry (Lakes Entrance)	105	8	113
1979		0	0	0
1980	I Fleischer	0	0	0
1981	Peter Baker (Orbost)	105	4	109
1982	Wayne Reggardo (Lakes Entrance)	112	0	112
1983	Garry Lee (Lucknow)	102	0	102
1984	D Somerville (Lucknow)	43	0	43
1985	Graeme Joiner (Snowy Rovers)	92	0	92
1986	Darren Vickery (Orbost)	60	2	62
1987	Wayne Reggardo (Lakes Entrance)	88	12	100
1988	Bruce Alexander (Lindenow)	66	6	72
1989	Wayne Reggardo (Lakes Entrance)	88	5	93
1990	Wayne Reggardo (Lakes Entrance)	120	0	120
1991	Stephen Schaeche (Wy Yung)	106	5	111
1992	Stephen Schaeche (Wy Yung)	126	7	133
1993	Sean Allan (Lucknow)	86	8	94
1994	Mark Campisi (Lakes Entrance)	74	7	81
1995	David Dunkley (Lindenow)	70	0	70
1996	Darren Vickery (Orbost)	111	14	125
1997	Tim Bull (Lucknow)	67	20	87
1998	Tim Bull (Lucknow)	61	0	61
1999	Ashley Froud (Bairnsdale)	60	0	60
2000	David Preston (Bairnsdale)	70	6	76
2001	David Preston (Bairnsdale)	82	4	86
2002	David Preston (Bairnsdale)	57	8	65
2003	David Preston (Bairnsdale)	81	8	89
2004	Darren Vickery (Orbost Snowy Rovers)	78	5	83
2005	David Preston (Bairnsdale)	110	9	119
2006	Mathew Davidson (Bairnsdale)	85	16	101
2007	Paul Elliott (Lucknow)	60	0	60
2008	Andrew Flannagan (Wy Yung)	70	7	77
2009	Mathew Davidson (Bairnsdale)	74	15	89
2010	Mathew Davidson (Bairnsdale)	128	4	132
2011	Stephen Nicholls (Wy Yung)	53	7	60
2012	Matt Counahan (Wy Yung)	53	5	58
2013	Matt Counahan (Wy Yung)	48	0	48
2014	Mark Sellings (Wy Yung)	47	19	66
2015	Shaun Ryan (Lucknow)	75	0	75
2016	Matthew Davidson (Paynesville)	62	4	66
2017	Michael Preston (Lindenow)	91	6	97
2018	Darren Allen (Lindenow)	57	0	57
2019	Hadyn Erfurth (Stratford)	50	0	50
2020	No play Covid lockdown	0	0	0
2021	Jim Reeves (Boisdale-Briagolong)	36	0	36
2022	Hamish Nettleton (Orbost Snowy Rovers)	49	0	49
2023	Caleb Calwyn (Boisdale-Briagolong)	72	7	79
2024	Jack Betts (Wy Yung)	53	0	53
2025	Jim Reeves (Boisdale-Briagolong)	51	3	54
2026	Peter Harrison (Lindenow)	61	13	74

== 2011 Ladder ==
East Gippsland	Wins	Byes	Losses	Draws	For	Against	%	Pts	Final	Team	G	B	Pts	Team	G	B	Pts
Wy Yung	14	0	2	0	1981	958	206.78%	56	1st Semi	Lakes Entrance	22	14	146	Orbost Snowy Rovers	12	8	80
Lindenow	14	0	2	0	1981	1056	187.59%	56	2nd Semi	Lindenow	13	7	85	Wy Yung	12	9	81
Lakes Entrance	9	0	7	0	1654	1393	118.74%	36	Preliminary	Wy Yung	10	19	79	Lakes Entrance	7	9	51
Orbost Snowy Rovers	5	0	11	0	1270	1875	67.73%	20	Grand	Lindenow	20	14	134	Wy Yung	11	6	72
Lucknow	4	0	12	0	1157	1769	65.40%	16									
Paynesville	2	0	14	0	1020	1911	53.38%	8									

== 2012 Ladder ==
East Gippsland	Wins	Byes	Losses	Draws	For	Against	%	Pts	Final	Team	G	B	Pts	Team	G	B	Pts
Wy Yung	12	3	4	0	1539	951	161.83%	60	1st Semi	Lucknow	12	14	86	Paynesville	6	12	48
Lindenow	11	3	4	1	1491	1155	129.09%	58	2nd Semi	Lindenow	12	8	80	Wy Yung	11	11	77
Paynesville	11	3	5	0	1536	1061	144.77%	56	Preliminary	Lucknow	15	20	110	Wy Yung	13	9	87
Lucknow	8	3	8	0	1107	1245	88.92%	44	Grand	Lindenow	14	15	99	Lucknow	5	12	42
Stratford	6	3	9	1	1202	1311	91.69%	38									
Lakes Entrance	5	3	11	0	1285	1441	89.17%	32									
Orbost Snowy Rovers	2	3	14	0	943	1939	48.63%	20									

== 2013 Ladder ==
East Gippsland	Wins	Byes	Losses	Draws	For	Against	%	Pts	Final	Team	G	B	Pts	Team	G	B	Pts
Lucknow	12	3	4	0	1500	1200	125.00%	60	1st Semi	Stratford	20	12	132	Lindenow	7	10	52
Paynesville	11	3	5	0	1683	1207	139.44%	56	2nd Semi	Paynesville	17	15	117	Lucknow	13	15	93
Stratford	11	3	5	0	1333	998	133.57%	56	Preliminary	Lucknow	12	20	92	Stratford	11	10	76
Lindenow	8	3	8	0	1452	1270	114.33%	44	Grand	Paynesville	15	7	97	Lucknow	11	11	77
Wy Yung	7	3	9	0	1047	1333	78.54%	40									
Lakes Entrance	5	3	11	0	1330	1467	90.66%	32									
Orbost Snowy Rovers	2	3	14	0	1058	1928	54.88%	20									

== 2014 Ladder ==
East Gippsland	Wins	Byes	Losses	Draws	For	Against	%	Pts	Final	Team	G	B	Pts	Team	G	B	Pts
Stratford	14	3	1	0	1594	757	210.57%	68	1st Semi	Wy Yung	13	8	86	Paynesville	10	10	70
Lindenow	10	3	5	0	1389	1001	138.76%	52	2nd Semi	Stratford	15	14	104	Lindenow	9	5	59
Wy Yung	10	3	5	0	1229	1077	114.11%	52	Preliminary	Wy Yung	14	10	94	Lindenow	6	12	48
Paynesville	8	3	7	0	1346	972	138.48%	44	Grand	Stratford	12	11	83	Wy Yung	12	8	80
Lakes Entrance	7	3	8	0	1036	1223	84.71%	40									
Lucknow	3	3	12	0	1047	1557	67.24%	24									
Orbost Snowy Rovers	1	2	15	0	856	1910	44.82%	12									

== 2015 Ladder ==
East Gippsland	Wins	Byes	Losses	Draws	For	Against	%	Pts	Final	Team	G	B	Pts	Team	G	B	Pts
Wy Yung	15	0	2	1	1764	993	177.64%	62	1st Semi	Lindenow	16	11	107	Paynesville	8	7	55
Stratford	14	0	4	0	1844	1082	170.43%	56	2nd Semi	Wy Yung	18	8	116	Stratford	6	5	41
Paynesville	10	0	7	1	1484	1310	113.28%	42	Preliminary	Lindenow	13	8	86	Stratford	9	15	69
Lindenow	10	0	8	0	1445	1492	96.85%	40	Grand	Wy Yung	13	10	88	Lindenow	11	15	81
Lucknow	8	0	10	0	1559	1333	116.95%	32									
Lakes Entrance	7	0	11	0	1123	1609	69.79%	28									
Boisdale Briagolong	6	0	12	0	1294	1523	84.96%	24									
Orbost Snowy Rovers	1	0	17	0	1017	2188	46.48%	4									

== 2016 Ladder ==
East Gippsland	Wins	Byes	Losses	Draws	For	Against	%	Pts	Final	Team	G	B	Pts	Team	G	B	Pts
Lindenow	17	0	1	0	1775	1024	173.34%	68	1st Semi	Orbost Snowy Rovers	14	10	94	Lakes Entrance	9	8	62
Paynesville	13	0	5	0	1768	1189	148.70%	52	2nd Semi	Paynesville	11	13	79	Lindenow	8	13	61
Lakes Entrance	10	0	8	0	1279	1393	91.82%	40	Preliminary	Lindenow	11	12	78	Orbost Snowy Rovers	4	5	29
Orbost Snowy Rovers	9	0	9	0	1495	1605	93.15%	36	Grand	Lindenow	13	13	91	Paynesville	7	12	54
Lucknow	8	0	10	0	1429	1540	92.79%	32									
Wy Yung	7	0	10	1	1357	1199	113.18%	30									
Boisdale Briagolong	6	0	11	1	1261	1475	85.49%	26									
Stratford	1	0	17	0	785	1724	45.53%	4									
