= North Gippsland Football League =

Australian rules football league

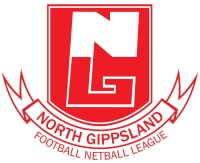
- First season: 1955
- No. of teams: 12
- State: Victoria
- Current premiers: Cowwarr (6)
- Most premierships: Glengarry (11)
- Official website: ngfnl.com.au

The North Gippsland Football Netball League (NGFNL) is an Australian rules football competition based in the Central Gippsland region of Victoria.

== History ==
The NGFL was formed in 1955 through the merger of the Cowwarr Football League and the Sale District Football League.

The league was known as the Sale Cowwarr FL, until taking its present name in 1965. The region where the league is located is home to a number of other Australian football leagues, and a number of clubs have shifted between the North Gippsland FL and others such as the Mid Gippsland Football League, Riviera Football League and Latrobe Valley Football League.

In 2008, the league gained the Woodside and District Wildcats, who broke away from the DWWWW club in the Alberton Football League, followed in 2014 by Yarram. In 2012 Stratford, followed by Boisdale-Briagolong in 2015 moved to the weaker East Gippsland Football League.

Games in the North Gippsland Football League are umpired by members of the Sale Umpires Association.

== League Football Records ==
Notable Records
Record		Details	Year
Highest Score			
Most Goals in a Match			
Most Goals in a Season	164 Goals	William Higgins – Heyfield	1976
Most Consecutive Premierships	4	Heyfield	1997–2000
Most Consecutive Wins	28 Wins	Sale City	2010–2012
Most Consecutive Losses	37 Losses	Nambrok	1998–2001

== Clubs ==
=== Current clubs ===
Club	Colours	Moniker	Home Ground	Former League	Est.	Years in Comp.	NGFL Senior Premierships	
Club	Colours	Moniker	Home Ground	Former League	Est.	Years in Comp.	Total	Years
Churchill		Cougars	Gaskin Park, Churchill	GL	1888	1995–	5	2002, 2003, 2008, 2014, 2019
Cowwarr		Saints	Cowwarr Recreation Reserve, Cowwarr	CFL	1892	1955–	6	1963, 1973, 1974, 1987, 2006, 2026
Glengarry		Magpies	Glengarry Recreation Reserve, Glengarry	CFL	1895	1955–	11	1959, 1966, 1967, 1968, 1971, 1981, 1983, 1984, 1994, 1996, 2013
Gormandale		Tigers	Gormandale Recreation Reserve, Gormandale	CFL	1898	1955–	6	1982, 1986, 1989, 1991, 1992, 1995
Heyfield		Kangaroos	Gordon Street Reserve, Heyfield	GL	1882	1975–	10	1976, 1988, 1997, 1998, 1999, 2000, 2005, 2007, 2009, 2012
Morwell East		Hawks	Ronald Reserve, Morwell	MGFNL	1973	2027–	0	-
Rosedale		Blues	Rosedale Recreation Reserve, Rosedale	CFL	1882	1955–	6	1958, 1961, 1962, 1965, 2001, 2015
Sale City		Bulldogs	Stephenson Park, Sale	–	1970	1970–2002, 2004–	7	1978, 1979, 1993, 2010, 2011, 2016, 2017
Traralgon Tyers United		Bombers	Tyers Recreation Reserve, Tyers	GL	1981	1981, 1989–	3	1990, 2004, 2023
Woodside & District		Wildcats	Woodside Recreation Reserve, Woodside	–	2008	2008–	2	2024, 2025
Yallourn Yallourn North		Jets	George Bates Reserve, Yallourn North	MGFNL	1977	2021–	1	2022
Yarram		Demons	Yarram Recreation Reserve, Yarram	AFNL	1887	2014–	1	2018

=== Former ===
Club	Colours	Moniker	Home Ground	Former League	Est.	Years in Comp.	NGFL Senior Premierships		Fate
Club	Colours	Moniker	Home Ground	Former League	Est.	Years in Comp.	Total	Years	Fate
Boisdale		Bombers	Boisdale Recreation Reserve, Boisdale	SDFL	c.1900	1955–1982	1	1970	Merged with Briagolong in 1982, who had been in recess since the c. 1952 SDFL season
Boisdale-Briagolong		Bombers	Boisdale Recreation Reserve, Boisdale	RFL	1982	1983–1985, 2004–2014	0	-	Moved to Riviera FL in 1986 and East Gippsland FL in 2015
Clydebank				SDFL	c.1930s	1955	0	-	Folded after 1955 season
Maffra Rovers	Dark with light vee	Rovers		SDFL		1955–1956, 1960–1973	1	1969	Merged with Maffra in 1974
Maryvale			Maryvale Paper Mill Oval, Maryvale	–	c.1950s	1960–1965	1	1964	Moved to Mid Gippsland FL in 1966
Nambrok		Hawks	Nambrok Recreation Reserve, Nambrok	SDFL, RFL	1913	1958–1999, 2004	3	1977, 1980, 1985	Moved to Riviera FL in 2000, returned in 2004, folded after 2004 season.
Newry	(1955–88)(2004)	Crows	Newry Recreation Reserve, Newry	CFL, RFL	c.1900	1955–1988, 2004	2	1956, 1957	Moved to Riviera FL in 1989, returned in 2004, folded after 2004 season.
Old Collegians				–	1955	1955–1956	0	-	Folded after 1956 season
RAAF East Sale		Cats	RAAF East Sale	SDFL	1943	1955–1985	4	1955, 1960, 1972, 1975	Formed Riviera FL in 1986
Stratford		Swans	Stratford Recreation Reserve, Stratford	GL, RFL	c.1900	1974–1988, 2004–2011	0	-	Moved to Riviera FL in 1989 and East Gippsland FL in 2012
St Patrick's College		Students		SDFL		1955–1960	0	-	Folded after 1960 season
Toongabbie		Yabbies	Toongabbie Recreation Reserve, Toongabbie	CFL	c.1900	1987–1997	0	-	Folded after 1997 season
Traralgon Seconds		Maroons	Traralgon Recreation Reserve, Traralgon	CFL	1883	1963–1967	0	-	Joined seniors in Gippsland Latrobe Valley FL in 1968

== Premiers ==
Year	Premier	Runner up
Sale Cowwarr Football League
1955	RAAF 14.22.106	Maffra Rovers 3.8.26
1956	Newry 9.12.66	RAAF 8.4.52
1957	Newry 8.7.55	Gormandale 7.4.46
1958	Rosedale 10.6.66	Newry 8.17.65
1959	Glengarry 13.9.87	RAAF 12.8.61
1960	RAAF 8.13.61	Glengarry 6.10.46
1961	Rosedale 10.9.69	Cowwarr 7.6.48
1962	Rosedale 3.8.26	Maryvale 3.6.24
1963	Cowwarr 7.5.47	Gormandale 3.3.21
1964	Maryvale 11.11.77	Maffra Rovers 10.9.69
North Gippsland Football League
1965	Rosedale 10.7.67	Maryvale 6.15.51
1966	Glengarry 9.4.64	Traralgon 8.7.55
1967	Glengarry 12.14.86	Rosedale 7.5.47
1968	Glengarry 7.16.58	Maffra Rovers 7.5.47
1969	Maffra Rovers 10.13.73	Boisdale 9.4.58
1970	Boisdale 17.14.116	Nambrok 7.15.57
1971	Glengarry 11.12.78	Boisdale 7.11.53
1972	RAAF 16.11.107	Glengarry 10.5.65
1973	Cowwarr 9.14.68	Gormandale 9.7.61
1974	Cowwarr 11.10.76	Newry 6.6.42
1975	RAAF 8.14.62	Newry 6.12.48
1976	Heyfield (Champions) 17.18.110	Stratford 11.16.82
1977	Nambrok (Champions) 13.7.85	Sale City 11.6.72
1978	Sale City 14.12.96	Nambrok 9.15.69
1979	Sale City 12.14.86	Nambrok 11.16.82
1980	Nambrok 14.9.93	Glengarry 11.8.74
1981	Glengarry 14.16.100	Gormandale 7.5.47
1982	Gormandale 15.6.96	Glengarry 8.10.58
1983	Glengarry 22.12.144	Gormandale 7.12.54
1984	Glengarry 12.4.76	Gormandale 11.6.72
1985	Nambrok 21.9.135	Heyfield 17.5.107
1986	Gormandale (Champions) 13.8.86	Cowwarr 10.13.73
1987	Cowwarr 15.4.94	Heyfield 12.11.83
1988	Heyfield 11.12.78	Cowwarr 5.12.42
1989	Gormandale 10.14.74	Glengarry 10.9.69
1990	Traralgon Tyers United 12.19.91	Heyfield 10.10.70
1991	Gormandale 22.19.151	Heyfield 15.9.99
1992	Gormandale (Champions) 8.9.57	Glengarry 3.4.22
1993	Sale City 10.14.74	Gormandale 8.6.54
1994	Glengarry 11.16.82	Gormandale 11.11.77
1995	Gormandale 13.13.91	Churchill 12.11.83
1996	Glengarry 10.13.73	Churchill 10.12.72
1997	Heyfield 19.8.122	Traralgon Tyers United 6.14.56
1998	Heyfield 14.15.99	Glengarry 11.13.79
1999	Heyfield 12.16.88	Sale City 9.7.61
2000	Heyfield (Champions) 15.11.101	Glengarry 8.6.54
North Gippsland Football Netball League
2001	Rosedale 17.10.112	Churchill 6.18.54
2002	Churchill 15.9.99	Traralgon Tyers United 5.3.33
2003	Churchill 14.14.98	Heyfield 12.10.82
2004	Traralgon Tyers United 17.8.110	Heyfield 6.8.44
2005	Heyfield 24.10.154	Cowwarr 10.9.69
2006	Cowwarr 11.21.87	Rosedale 10.7.67
2007	Heyfield 11.10.76	Churchill 8.11.59
2008	Churchill 11.10.76	Gormandale 9.19.73
2009	Heyfield 15.13.103	Churchill 10.14.74
2010	Sale City 17.16.118	Rosedale 13.11.89
2011	Sale City 16.14.110	Glengarry 14.9.93
2012	Heyfield 14.9.93	Rosedale 10.15.75
2013	Glengarry 16.15.111	Heyfield 15.15.105
2014	Churchill 20.9.129	Heyfield 10.18.78
2015	Rosedale 12.22.94	Heyfield 5.6.36
2016	Sale City 13.14.92	Heyfield 5.9.39
2017	Sale City 14.16.100	Yarram 5.11.41
2018	Yarram 8.17.65	Churchill 5.3.33
2019	Churchill 9.11.65	Yarram 8.10.58
2022	Yallourn Yallourn North 16.10.106	Traralgon Tyers United 9.8.62
2023	Traralgon Tyers United 4.14.38	Woodside 2.8.20
2024	Woodside 9.8.62	Traralgon Tyers United 5.17.47
2025	Woodside 12.12.84	Traralgon Tyers United 9.17.71
2026	Cowwarr 19.8.122	Woodside 13.8.86

=== Leading Goal Kickers ===
Year	Player	H&A goals	Finals goals	Total Goals
1955	P Robinson (Maffra Rovers)	87	0	87
1956	Daryl Lane (Gormandale)	79	0	79
1957	Daryl Lane (Gormandale)	44	4	48
1958	H Gallatly (Newry)	60	6	66
1959	T. O'Callaghan (Glengarry)	60	0	60
1960	T. O'Callaghan (Glengarry)	76	0	76
1961	T. O'Callaghan (Glengarry)	59	0	59
1962	R Cugley (Glengarry)	71	0	71
1963	A. Anton (Cowwarr)	58	0	58
1964	T. Robinson (Maffra Rovers)	58	0	58
1965	B Farley (Rosedale)	74	0	74
1966	G Robbins (Glengarry)	101	0	101
1967	J Glenton (Nambrok)	58	0	58
1968	C French (Boisdale)	44	0	44
1969	N Farrington (Rosedale)	85	0	85
1970	D O'Donnell (Cowwarr)	78	0	78
1971	D O'Donnell (Cowwarr)	89	0	89
1972	G Steele (Boisdale)	77	0	77
1973	P Northe (Gormandale)	80	0	80
1974	G. Domaille (Gormandale)	59	0	59
1975	M Jones (RAAF)	99	0	99
1976	William Higgins (Heyfield)	164	10	174
1977	R Reid (Rosedale)	79	0	79
1978	D Parker (Cowwarr)	75	0	75
1979	P. Wojcinski (Heyfield)	95	0	95
1980	D Reid (Rosedale)	78	0	78
1981	G Young (RAAF)	114	0	114
1982	R Cowell (Gormandale)	107	0	107
1983	R King (Glengarry)	121	0	121
1984	B Doolan (Nambrok)	99	0	99
1985	Chris May (Glengarry)	112	0	112
1986	Paul Horton (Rosedale)	67	0	67
1987	Paul Horton (Rosedale)	73	0	73
1988	Paul Horton (Rosedale)	111	0	111
1989	Dean Grant (Gormandale)	61	0	61
1990	Paul Horton (Rosedale)	79	0	79
1991	Rod Jennings (TTU)	58	0	58
1992	Grantley Switzer (Gormandale)	79	0	79
1993	John Ashby (Sale City)	92	10	102
1994	Rod Jennings (TTU)	77	0	77
1995	David Reid (Heyfield)	69	0	69
1996	Steve Sanders (Churchill)	100	0	100
1997	Chris Membrey (Glengarry)	88	7	95
1998	Nathan McDonald (Churchill)	109	0	109
1999	Rod Tylor (Glengarry)	88	1	89
2000	David Ivey( Heyfield)	111	13	124
2001	Nick Leechino (Rosedale)	87	5	92
2002	Nick Leechino (Rosedale)	72	2	74
2003	T Darby (Churchill)	84	0	84
2004	David Ivey( Cowwarr)	84	0	84
2005	Paul Richards (Gormandale)	70	0	70
2006	Paul Richards (Gormandale)	69	0	69
2007	Gerard Kennedy (Heyfield)	65	11	76
2008	Nathan McDonald (Churchill)	75	17	92
2009	Justin Staley (Woodside)	74	0	74
2010	Paul Richards (Gormandale)	78	0	78
2011	Jacob Schuback (Sale City)	101	12	113
2012	Josh King (Glengarry)	75	5	80
2013	Josh King (Glengarry)	54	18	72
2014	Justin Staley (Woodside)	65	1	66
2015	Stephen Hawkins (TTU)	57	1	58
2016	Brandon McDonald (Rosedale)	77	0	77
2017	Corbin Sutherland (Yarram)	65	4	69
2018	Stuart Buckley (Sale City)	50	4	54
2019	Shane Morgan (Cowwarr)	67	0	67
2021	Brandon McDonald (Rosedale)	48	0	48
2022	Ben Kearns (Churchill)	76	0	76
2023	Daniel Farmer (Woodside)	82	8	90
2024	Dean Macdonald (YYN)	71	8	79
2025	Dean Macdonald (YYN)	81	0	81
2026	Keenan Hughes (Cowwarr)	116	8	124

== 2007 Ladder ==
North Gippsland FL	Wins	Byes	Losses	Draws	For	Against	%	Pts	Final	Team	G	B	Pts	Team	G	B	Pts
Churchill	17	0	1	0	1850	881	209.99%	68	Elimination	Gormandale	17	7	109	Cowwarr	8	12	60
Heyfield	16	0	2	0	1924	921	208.90%	64	Qualifying	Heyfield	19	20	134	Rosedale	13	6	84
Rosedale	13	0	5	0	1944	890	218.43%	52	1st Semi	Rosedale	16	16	112	Gormandale	10	10	70
Gormandale	12	0	6	0	1691	1041	162.44%	48	2nd Semi	Churchill	10	9	69	Heyfield	14	11	95
Cowwarr	12	0	6	0	1813	1341	135.20%	48	Preliminary	Churchill	19	7	121	Rosedale	13	9	87
Sale City	6	0	12	0	1166	1595	73.10%	24	Grand	Heyfield	11	10	76	Churchill	8	11	59
TT United	6	0	12	0	995	1805	55.12%	24									
Boisdale Braigolong	4	0	14	0	1082	1646	65.74%	16									
Glengarry	4	0	14	0	1082	1853	58.39%	16									
Stratford	0	0	18	0	723	2297	31.48%	0									

== 2008 Ladder ==
North Gippsland FL	Wins	Byes	Losses	Draws	For	Against	%	Pts	Final	Team	G	B	Pts	Team	G	B	Pts
Gormandale	16	2	2	0	2022	896	225.67%	72	Elimination	Heyfield	23	19	157	Boisdale Braigolong	5	14	44
Churchill	14	2	4	0	1887	1228	153.66%	64	Qualifying	Churchill	16	9	105	Glengarry	9	15	69
Glengarry	13	2	5	0	1897	1223	155.11%	60	1st Semi	Glengarry	9	11	65	Heyfield	7	3	45
Heyfield	13	2	5	0	1975	1308	150.99%	60	2nd Semi	Gormandale	16	10	106	Churchill	13	13	91
Boisdale Braigolong	12	2	6	0	1875	1668	112.41%	56	Preliminary	Churchill	18	13	121	Glengarry	11	10	76
Rosedale	10	2	8	0	1832	1376	133.14%	48	Grand	Churchill	11	10	76	Gormandale	9	19	73
Cowwarr	7	2	11	0	1596	1906	83.74%	36									
TT United	6	2	12	0	1406	1658	84.80%	32									
Sale City	5	2	13	0	1413	1685	83.86%	28									
Welshpool	2	2	16	0	959	2618	36.63%	16									
Stratford	1	2	17	0	1077	2373	45.39%	12									

== 2009 Ladder ==
North Gippsland FL	Wins	Byes	Losses	Draws	For	Against	%	Pts	Final	Team	G	B	Pts	Team	G	B	Pts
Heyfield	16	0	2	0	2094	1295	161.70%	64	Elimination	Gormandale	14	13	97	Woodside	9	8	62
Churchill	14	0	4	0	1812	1319	137.38%	56	Qualifying	Churchill	15	10	100	Boisdale Braigolong	7	8	50
Boisdale Braigolong	13	0	5	0	1823	1473	123.76%	52	1st Semi	Churchill	11	10	76	Boisdale Braigolong	10	7	67
Woodside	11	0	7	0	1652	1515	109.04%	44	2nd Semi	Churchill	12	8	80	Heyfield	8	14	62
Gormandale	9	0	9	0	1418	1234	114.91%	36	Preliminary	Heyfield	13	15	93	Gormandale	13	11	89
Rosedale	8	0	10	0	1744	1692	103.07%	32	Grand	Heyfield	15	13	103	Churchill	10	14	74
Sale City	7	0	11	0	1662	1626	102.21%	28									
TT United	7	0	11	0	1334	1746	76.40%	28									
Glengarry	6	0	12	0	1466	1539	95.26%	24									
Cowwarr	5	0	13	0	1316	1881	69.96%	20									
Stratford	3	0	15	0	1103	2104	52.42%	12									

== 2010 Ladder ==
North Gippsland FL	Wins	Byes	Losses	Draws	For	Against	%	Pts	Final	Team	G	B	Pts	Team	G	B	Pts
Sale City	16	0	2	0	2467	932	264.70%	64	Elimination	Rosedale	20	19	139	Churchill	9	11	65
Gormandale	15	0	3	0	2170	1173	185.00%	60	Qualifying	Gormandale	17	14	116	Glengarry	10	11	71
Glengarry	14	0	4	0	1937	1297	149.34%	56	1st Semi	Rosedale	23	18	156	Glengarry	8	6	54
Churchill	13	0	5	0	1816	1431	126.90%	52	2nd Semi	Sale City	12	16	88	Gormandale	11	11	77
Rosedale	11	0	7	0	2105	1351	155.81%	44	Preliminary	Rosedale	21	18	144	Gormandale	14	3	87
Heyfield	10	0	8	0	1711	1436	119.15%	40	Grand	Sale City	17	16	118	Rosedale	13	11	89
Cowwarr	7	0	11	0	1517	1611	94.17%	28									
Boisdale Braigolong	5	0	13	0	1147	2192	52.33%	20									
Woodside	4	0	14	0	1274	2031	62.73%	16									
TT United	3	0	15	0	993	1945	51.05%	12									
Stratford	1	0	17	0	804	2542	31.63%	4									

== 2011 Ladder ==
North Gippsland FL	Wins	Byes	Losses	Draws	For	Against	%	Pts	Final	Team	G	B	Pts	Team	G	B	Pts
Sale City	18	0	0	0	2359	1174	200.94%	72	Elimination	Churchill	8	22	70	Rosedale	10	7	67
Glengarry	15	0	3	0	1953	1197	163.16%	60	Qualifying	Glengarry	8	13	61	Cowwarr	7	15	57
Cowwarr	14	0	4	0	1976	1254	157.58%	56	1st Semi	Cowwarr	21	12	138	Churchill	12	7	79
Churchill	10	0	8	0	1511	1490	101.41%	40	2nd Semi	Glengarry	20	9	129	Sale City	15	8	98
Rosedale	10	0	8	0	1737	1757	98.86%	40	Preliminary	Sale City	13	14	92	Cowwarr	11	10	76
TT United	9	0	9	0	1617	1564	103.39%	36	Grand	Sale City	16	14	110	Glengarry	14	9	93
Heyfield	8	0	10	0	1644	1505	109.24%	32									
Woodside	6	0	12	0	1333	1885	70.72%	24									
Gormandale	5	0	13	0	1303	1673	77.88%	20									
Boisdale Braigolong	2	0	16	0	1108	1890	58.62%	8									
Stratford	2	0	16	0	944	2096	45.04%	8									

== 2012 Ladder ==
North Gippsland FL	Wins	Byes	Losses	Draws	For	Against	%	Pts	Final	Team	G	B	Pts	Team	G	B	Pts
Rosedale	15	0	3	0	2253	999	225.53%	60	Elimination	Cowwarr	12	8	80	Glengarry	11	9	75
Sale City	14	0	4	0	2185	1203	181.63%	56	Qualifying	Heyfield	13	17	95	Sale City	7	14	56
Heyfield	13	0	5	0	1947	1299	149.88%	52	1st Semi	Sale City	14	14	98	Cowwarr	14	13	97
Glengarry	12	0	6	0	2117	1246	169.90%	48	2nd Semi	Rosedale	21	13	139	Heyfield	9	14	68
Cowwarr	12	0	6	0	1835	1301	141.05%	48	Preliminary	Heyfield	14	15	99	Sale City	10	4	64
Churchill	9	0	9	0	1927	1334	144.45%	36	Grand	Heyfield	14	9	93	Rosedale	10	15	75
TT United	9	0	9	0	1651	1364	121.04%	36									
Boisdale Braigolong	2	0	16	0	952	2542	37.45%	8									
Gormandale	2	0	16	0	866	2511	34.49%	8									
Woodside	2	0	16	0	845	2779	30.41%	8									

== 2013 Ladder ==
North Gippsland FL	Wins	Byes	Losses	Draws	For	Against	%	Pts	Final	Team	G	B	Pts	Team	G	B	Pts
Heyfield	14	0	4	0	1768	1255	140.88%	56	Elimination	Rosedale	18	12	120	Churchill	12	17	89
TT United	11	0	7	0	1606	1279	125.57%	44	Qualifying	Glengarry	11	24	90	Traralgon Tyers United	4	3	27
Glengarry	11	0	7	0	1682	1372	122.59%	44	1st Semi	Rosedale	13	17	95	Traralgon Tyers United	5	5	35
Churchill	11	0	7	0	1859	1616	115.04%	44	2nd Semi	Glengarry	18	8	116	Heyfield	15	8	98
Rosedale	11	0	7	0	1567	1430	109.58%	44	Preliminary	Heyfield	13	14	92	Rosedale	9	18	72
Cowwarr	10	0	7	1	1725	1508	114.39%	42	Grand	Glengarry	16	15	111	Heyfield	15	15	105
Woodside	10	0	8	0	1621	1692	95.80%	40									
Gormandale	4	0	13	1	1196	1610	74.29%	18									
Sale City	4	0	14	0	1326	1801	73.63%	16									
Boisdale Braigolong	3	0	15	0	1166	1953	59.70%	12									

== 2014 Ladder ==
North Gippsland FL	Wins	Byes	Losses	Draws	For	Against	%	Pts	Final	Team	G	B	Pts	Team	G	B	Pts
Heyfield	18	0	0	0	2380	1001	237.76%	72	Elimination	Sale City	19	9	123	Woodside	12	11	83
Churchill	14	0	4	0	2480	1290	192.25%	56	Qualifying	Churchill	17	18	120	Rosedale	12	14	86
Rosedale	13	0	5	0	1896	1341	141.39%	52	1st Semi	Sale City	17	10	112	Rosedale	9	15	69
Sale City	11	0	7	0	1658	1495	110.90%	44	2nd Semi	Heyfield	16	15	111	Churchill	10	9	69
Woodside	9	0	9	0	1702	1610	105.71%	36	Preliminary	Churchill	13	13	91	Sale City	10	11	71
Yarram	9	0	9	0	1659	1667	99.52%	36	Grand	Churchill	20	9	129	Heyfield	10	18	78
Cowwarr	8	0	10	0	1418	1892	74.95%	32									
Glengarry	6	0	12	0	1292	1872	69.02%	24									
TT United	5	0	13	0	1337	1721	77.69%	20									
Gormandale	5	0	13	0	1392	2010	69.25%	20									
Boisdale Braigolong	1	0	17	0	1018	2333	43.63%	4									

== 2015 Ladder ==
North Gippsland FL	Wins	Byes	Losses	Draws	For	Against	%	Pts	Final	Team	G	B	Pts	Team	G	B	Pts
Rosedale	15	0	3	0	2306	1043	221.09%	60	Elimination	Churchill	16	8	104	TT United	7	10	52
Sale City	14	0	3	1	1977	1260	156.90%	58	Qualifying	Heyfield	13	10	88	Sale City	11	12	78
Heyfield	12	0	6	0	2020	1292	156.35%	48	1st Semi	Churchill	18	9	117	Sale City	15	16	106
TT United	12	0	6	0	2041	1393	146.52%	48	2nd Semi	Rosedale	16	10	106	Heyfield	6	12	48
Churchill	12	0	6	0	1992	1522	130.88%	48	Preliminary	Heyfield	22	21	153	Churchill	15	8	98
Yarram	11	0	7	0	1987	1436	138.37%	44	Grand	Rosedale	12	22	94	Heyfield	5	6	36
Gormandale	5	0	13	0	1622	2030	79.90%	20									
Cowwarr	4	0	13	1	1306	1963	66.53%	18									
Woodside	4	0	14	0	1388	2593	53.53%	16									
Glengarry	0	0	18	0	750	2857	26.25%	0									

== 2016 Ladder ==
North Gippsland FL	Wins	Byes	Losses	Draws	For	Against	%	Pts	Final	Team	G	B	Pts	Team	G	B	Pts
Sale City	17	0	1	0	2134	940	227.02%	68	Elimination	Yarram	17	13	115	Woodside	10	15	75
Churchill	14	0	3	1	2040	1447	140.98%	58	Qualifying	Heyfield	14	14	98	Churchill	5	8	38
Heyfield	13	0	5	0	1669	1375	121.38%	52	1st Semi	Yarram	19	16	130	Churchill	10	12	72
Yarram	11	0	6	1	1848	1382	133.72%	46	2nd Semi	Heyfield	14	16	100	Sale City	10	12	72
Woodside	11	0	7	0	1823	1653	110.28%	44	Preliminary	Sale City	10	12	72	Yarram	9	8	62
Rosedale	9	0	9	0	1579	1425	110.81%	36	Grand	Sale City	13	14	92	Heyfield	5	9	39
Cowwarr	5	0	13	0	1444	1781	81.08%	20									
TT United	5	0	13	0	1278	1796	71.16%	20									
Glengarry	3	0	15	0	1220	1837	66.41%	12									
Gormandale	1	0	17	0	1441	2840	50.74%	4									

== 2017 Ladder ==
North Gippsland FL	Wins	Byes	Losses	Draws	For	Against	%	Pts	Final	Team	G	B	Pts	Team	G	B	Pts
Yarram	16	0	2	0	2048	1086	188.58%	64	Elimination	Churchill	18	11	119	Woodside	13	8	86
Sale City	15	0	3	0	2291	876	261.53%	60	Qualifying	Sale City	10	9	69	Heyfield	12	10	82
Heyfield	14	0	4	0	1781	1122	158.73%	56	1st Semi	Sale City	18	20	128	Churchill	13	8	86
Churchill	12	0	6	0	1816	1441	126.02%	48	2nd Semi	Yarram	20	20	140	Heyfield	13	8	86
Woodside	11	0	7	0	1393	1498	92.99%	44	Preliminary	Sale City	16	11	107	Heyfield	10	8	68
Cowwarr	7	0	11	0	1420	1616	87.87%	28	Grand	Sale City	14	16	100	Yarram	5	11	41
Glengarry	6	0	12	0	1463	1628	89.86%	24									
TT United	6	0	12	0	1288	1628	79.12%	24									
Rosedale	3	0	15	0	1231	1854	66.40%	12									
Gormandale	0	0	18	0	799	2781	28.73%	0									

== 2018 Ladder ==
North Gippsland FL	Wins	Byes	Losses	Draws	For	Against	%	Pts	Final	Team	G	B	Pts	Team	G	B	Pts
Yarram	17	0	1	0	1804	912	197.81%	68	Elimination	Sale City	9	12	66	Rosedale	8	10	58
TT United	15	0	3	0	1583	918	172.44%	60	Qualifying	TT United	13	6	84	Churchill	8	12	60
Churchill	13	0	5	0	1715	1187	144.48%	52	1st Semi	Churchill	19	11	125	Sale City	12	14	86
Rosedale	11	0	7	0	1333	1131	117.86%	44	2nd Semi	Yarram	14	10	94	TT United	9	8	62
Sale City	10	0	8	0	1475	1194	123.53%	40	Preliminary	Churchill	14	11	95	TT United	9	14	68
Woodside	10	0	8	0	1368	1284	106.54%	40	Grand	Yarram	8	17	65	Churchill	5	3	33
Heyfield	7	0	11	0	1028	1328	77.41%	28									
Gormandale	4	0	14	0	1083	1656	65.40%	16									
Cowwarr	2	0	16	0	968	1810	53.48%	8									
Glengarry	1	0	17	0	788	1725	45.68%	4									

== 2019 Ladder ==
North Gippsland FL	Wins	Byes	Losses	Draws	For	Against	%	Pts	Final	Team	G	B	Pts	Team	G	B	Pts
Churchill	17	0	1	0	2053	1002	204.89%	68	Elimination	Rosedale	15	8	98	Heyfield	12	10	82
Yarram	16	0	2	0	2158	825	261.58%	64	Qualifying	Yarram	13	26	104	TT United	7	7	49
Heyfield	12	0	6	0	1674	1076	155.58%	48	1st Semi	Rosedale	10	18	78	TT United	5	11	41
TT United	12	0	6	0	1581	1083	145.98%	48	2nd Semi	Yarram	19	10	124	Churchill	18	8	116
Rosedale	10	0	8	0	1619	1027	157.64%	40	Preliminary	Churchill	15	13	103	Rosedale	13	11	89
Sale City	8	0	10	0	1520	1424	106.74%	32	Grand	Churchill	9	11	65	Yarram	8	10	58
Cowwarr	7	0	11	0	1379	1386	99.49%	28									
Woodside	5	0	13	0	1189	1665	71.41%	20									
Glengarry	3	0	15	0	959	2306	41.59%	12									
Gormandale	0	0	18	0	474	2812	16.86%	0									

== 2022 Ladder ==
North Gippsland FL	Wins	Byes	Losses	Draws	For	Against	%	Pts	Final	Team	G	B	Pts	Team	G	B	Pts
Yallourn-Yallourn North	15	2	1	0	1900	643	295.49%	60	Elimination	Woodside	11	16	82	Yarram	5	15	45
Churchill	13	2	3	0	1966	1043	188.49%	52	Qualifying	TT United	10	12	72	Churchill	6	8	44
TT United	12	2	4	0	1695	865	195.95%	48	1st Semi	Woodside	20	7	127	Churchill	12	12	84
Yarram	12	2	4	0	1393	1080	128.98%	48	2nd Semi	TT United	15	14	104	YYN	7	14	56
Woodside	9	2	7	0	1489	969	153.66%	36	Preliminary	YYN	13	10	88	Woodside	10	5	65
Sale City	8	2	7	1	1341	1107	121.14%	34	Grand	YYN	16	10	106	TT United	9	8	62
Heyfield	6	2	10	0	1209	1096	110.31%	24									
Rosedale	5	2	10	1	1178	1166	101.03%	22									
Glengarry	5	2	11	0	1067	1491	71.56%	20									
Cowwarr	1	2	15	0	587	2270	25.86%	4									
Gormandale	1	2	15	0	510	2605	19.58%	4									

== 2023 Ladder ==
North Gippsland FL	Wins	Byes	Losses	Draws	For	Against	%	Pts	Final	Team	G	B	Pts	Team	G	B	Pts
TT United	16	2	0	0	2065	636	324.69%	64	Elimination	Churchill	18	10	118	YYN	17	13	115
Woodside	14	2	2	0	2155	680	316.91%	56	Qualifying	Woodside	16	14	110	Heyfield	9	6	60
Heyfield	11	2	5	0	1557	1216	128.04%	44	1st Semi	Heyfield	16	17	113	Churchill	5	22	52
Yallourn-Yallourn North	10	2	6	0	1786	1031	173.23%	40	2nd Semi	TT United	13	9	87	Woodside	10	9	69
Churchill	10	2	6	0	1732	1289	134.37%	32	Preliminary	Woodside	11	9	75	Heyfield	7	4	46
Yarram	8	2	8	0	1329	1165	114.08%	32	Grand	TT United	4	14	38	Woodside	2	8	20
Sale city	8	2	8	0	1260	1361	92.58%	32									
Rosedale	5	2	10	1	933	1845	50.57%	22									
Glengarry	3	2	13	0	860	1633	52.66%	12									
Cowwarr	2	2	13	1	898	1840	48.8%	10									
Gormandale	0	2	16	0	480	2359	20.35%	0									
