= Mid Gippsland Football Netball League =

Australian rules football league

- Sport: Australian Rules Football, Netball
- Founded: 1935
- President: John Schelling
- No. of teams: 13
- Country: Australia
- Most recent champion: Fish Creek (3)
- Most titles: Yinnar (14)
- Website: www.midgippslandfnl.com.au

The Mid Gippsland Football Netball League (MGFNL), formerly the Mid Gippsland Football League (MGFL), is an Australian rules football and netball competition in the Gippsland region of Victoria, Australia. The football league was formed in 1935 and currently comprises 13 clubs.

In November 2019, the Mid Gippsland Football League and Mid Gippsland Netball Association amalgamated to form the present Mid Gippsland Football Netball League. Six clubs from the Alberton Football Netball League — Fish Creek, Foster, Meeniyan Dumbalk United, Stony Creek, Tarwin and Toora — joined the competition for the 2021 season.

The league comprised 13 clubs during the 2026 season, with clubs based across the Latrobe Valley and South Gippsland. Morwell East will transfer to the North Gippsland Football Netball League from the 2027 season.

== History ==
=== Formation and early years ===
The Mid Gippsland Football League was formed in April 1935 following the collapse of the Morwell-Yallourn Football League. Delegates from Boolarra, Brown Coal Mine, Morwell Bridge, Morwell Seconds, Yallourn Imperials and Yinnar met on 4 April 1935 to establish the new competition.

The league's first matches were played on 4 May 1935 as part of a ten-round season. Morwell Seconds became the inaugural premiers, defeating Boolarra 7.11 (53) to 4.7 (31) at Morwell.

Haunted Hills and Thorpdale joined the competition in 1936.

The competition was reduced to five teams in 1940 during the early years of the Second World War. The league was re-formed in 1946, when Morwell Remnants, Hazelwood, Brown Coal Mine Youth Club, Brown Coal Mine Imperials and Hill End-Willow Grove Rovers joined the competition.

=== Post-war expansion ===
The league continued to expand after its re-formation in 1946. That year, the MGFL played its first representative match as a curtain-raiser to the grand final, defeating a combined RAAF team. Proceeds from the match were donated to the Food for Britain Fund.

Erica joined in 1947, while the two Brown Coal Mine teams amalgamated and Morwell Remnants disbanded. Hazelwood emerged as one of the league's strongest clubs during the early 1950s, winning three consecutive senior premierships from 1951 to 1953.

Dumbalk and Mirboo North joined the league in 1955, the same year a reserves competition was introduced. Mirboo North won both the senior and reserves premierships in 1956, becoming the first club to win both grades in the same season.

Newborough Football Club was established in 1957 and entered the Mid Gippsland league that year. The club won its first senior premiership two years later, in 1959.

A thirds competition was introduced in 1964. Maryvale joined the league in 1966 after previously competing in the Sale-Cowwarr Football League.

The competition expanded again in 1969 when Trafalgar joined from the Latrobe Valley Football League and Mirboo North returned after eleven seasons in the South Gippsland Football League.

=== Changes in the 1970s and 1980s ===
Morwell East entered a senior team in the Mid Gippsland Football League in 1973, having previously competed at junior level. Yarragon joined the league in 1977 following a successful appeal to the Victorian Country Football League to transfer from the West Gippsland Football League. Yarragon won the senior premiership in its first Mid Gippsland season, defeating Newborough in the 1977 grand final.

Several clubs moved between Mid Gippsland and the larger Latrobe Valley Football League during the late 1970s and 1980s. Newborough left Mid Gippsland after winning the 1978 premiership and competed in the Latrobe Valley league before returning to Mid Gippsland in 1986.

Hazelwood, which had become Hazelwood-Churchill in 1970 and then Churchill in 1981, left Mid Gippsland following the 1983 season. The club transferred to the Latrobe Valley Football League in 1984 after winning consecutive Mid Gippsland senior premierships in 1982 and 1983.

Yallourn and Yallourn North had amalgamated ahead of the 1977 season to form Yallourn Yallourn North, initially competing in the Latrobe Valley Football League. The combined club later joined Mid Gippsland and won consecutive senior premierships in 1986 and 1987.

Maryvale played its final season in 1986 and disbanded in early 1987 after struggling to field teams and attract financial support.

=== Period of stability ===
Following the closure of Maryvale in 1987, the league entered a comparatively stable period. Newborough won three consecutive senior premierships from 1988 to 1990, while Trafalgar appeared in nine consecutive grand finals between 1988 and 1996, winning premierships in 1991, 1992, 1994 and 1995.

By 2018, the Mid Gippsland Football League comprised ten affiliated clubs: Boolarra, Hill End, Mirboo North, Morwell East, Newborough, Thorpdale, Trafalgar, Yallourn Yallourn North, Yarragon and Yinnar. The league conducted senior, reserves, under-18 and under-16 football competitions, while the separate Mid Gippsland Netball Association operated six grades of netball.

=== Restructuring and expansion ===
In 2018, AFL Gippsland conducted a review of senior football and netball competitions across the region. The review recommended that the six remaining Alberton Football Netball League clubs — Fish Creek, Foster, Meeniyan Dumbalk United, Stony Creek, Tarwin and Toora — join the nine remaining Mid Gippsland clubs in a single competition. The review also recommended that Yarragon transfer from Mid Gippsland to the Ellinbank & District Football League for the 2019 season.

The proposed merger of the Alberton and Mid Gippsland competitions was opposed by Mid Gippsland clubs and was subsequently overturned by AFL Victoria following an appeal by the league.

In November 2019, the Mid Gippsland Football League and Mid Gippsland Netball Association amalgamated to form the Mid Gippsland Football Netball League.

The league's 2020 senior football and netball competitions were cancelled because of restrictions associated with the COVID-19 pandemic. During the recess, the MGFNL voted to admit all six remaining Alberton clubs from the 2021 season.

Ahead of the expanded 2021 season, Trafalgar transferred to the Ellinbank & District Football Netball League, while Yallourn Yallourn North moved to the North Gippsland Football Netball League. The departure of the two clubs and admission of the six Alberton clubs resulted in a 13-club Mid Gippsland competition for 2021.

=== Expanded competition ===
The expanded 13-club competition began in 2021, although the season was again disrupted by COVID-19 restrictions. The final home-and-away round was abandoned and, after further restrictions prevented a finals series from being completed, the remainder of the senior football and netball season was called off in September. Hill End finished the senior football season on top of the ladder, but no premiership was awarded.

The first completed finals series involving the six former Alberton clubs was held in 2022. Yinnar won the senior football premiership, defeating Newborough 8.9 (57) to 5.7 (37) in the grand final.

Fish Creek became the first former Alberton club to win the Mid Gippsland senior football premiership in 2023, defeating previously unbeaten Newborough in the grand final. The club won again in 2024, before Foster defeated Fish Creek in the 2025 grand final.

Fish Creek reclaimed the premiership in 2026, overcoming a 32-point quarter-time deficit to defeat Foster 18.11 (119) to 16.11 (107). The victory gave Fish Creek three premierships from four consecutive grand final appearances between 2023 and 2026.

Morwell East is scheduled to transfer to the North Gippsland Football Netball League for the 2027 season, reducing the Mid Gippsland competition to 12 clubs.

== Clubs ==
=== Current clubs ===
Club	Colours	Moniker	Home venue	Former League	Formed	Years in Mid Gippsland	Mid Gippsland Senior Premierships	
Club	Colours	Moniker	Home venue	Former League	Formed	Years in Mid Gippsland	Total	Years
Boolarra		Demons	Boolarra Recreation Reserve, Boolarra	MYJFA	1885	1935–present	4	1955, 1958, 1997, 2011
Fish Creek		Kangaroos	John Terrill Memorial Park, Fish Creek	AFNL	1891	2021–present	3	2023, 2024, 2026
Foster		Tigers	Foster Showgrounds, Foster	AFNL	1890	2021–present	1	2025
Hill End		Rovers, Hillmen	Willow Grove Recreation Reserve, Willow Grove	–	1946	1946–present	5	1948, 1949, 1962, 1974, 1981
Meeniyan Dumbalk United		Demons	Meeniyan Recreation Reserve, Meeniyan	AFNL	1964 (merger)	2021–present	0	-
Mirboo North		Tigers	Walter J Tuck Reserve, Mirboo North	SGFL	c.1900	1955–1957; 1969–present	7	1956, 1957, 2006, 2007, 2013, 2014, 2017
Morwell East		Hawks	Ronald Reserve, Morwell	–	1973	1973–present	3	1979, 1980, 2005
Newborough		Bulldogs	Northern Reserve, Newborough	GL	1957	1957–1978; 1986–present	10	1959, 1978, 1988, 1989, 1990, 1999, 2000, 2002, 2003, 2016
Stony Creek		Lions	Stony Creek Racecourse, Stony Creek	AFNL	1894	2021–present	0	-
Tarwin		Sharks	Tarwin Lower Recreation Reserve, Tarwin Lower	AFNL	1988	2021–present	0	-
Thorpdale		Blues	Thorpdale Recreation Reserve, Thorpdale	–	1887	1936–present	5	1946, 1960, 1961, 1976, 1985
Toora		Magpies	Toora Recreation Reserve, Toora	AFNL	1891	2021–present	0	-
Yinnar		Magpies	Yinnar Recreation Reserve, Yinnar	MYJFA	1883	1935–present	14	1939, 1954, 1964, 1967, 1969, 1970, 1971, 1973, 1998, 2001, 2004, 2008, 2015, 2022

† Morwell East will transfer to the North Gippsland Football Netball League from the 2027 season.

=== Former clubs ===
The following clubs formerly competed in the Mid Gippsland competition. Some transferred to other leagues, while others merged, changed identity or ceased operating.

Club	Colours	Moniker	Home venue	Previous League	Formed	Years in Mid Gippsland	Mid Gippsland Senior Premierships		Outcome
Club	Colours	Moniker	Home venue	Previous League	Formed	Years in Mid Gippsland	Total	Years	Outcome
Brown Coal Mine		Rovers		–	1935	1935–1939; 1946–1947	2	1937, 1947	The Brown Coal Mine sides were reorganised as Yallourn North for the 1948 season.
Churchill (Hazelwood 1946–69; Hazelwood/Churchill 1970–80)	(1946–69)(1970–83)	Kangaroos	Gaskin Park, Churchill	MMFA	1888	1946–1983	7	1951, 1952, 1953, 1965, 1966, 1982, 1983	Transferred to the Latrobe Valley Football League for the 1984 season.
Dumbalk			Dumbalk Recreation Reserve, Dumbalk	WDFL	c.1920s	1955–1957	0	-	Returned to the South Gippsland Football League for the 1958 season.
Erica	(1947–?)(?–1958)	Magpies, Woodcutters	Erica Recreation Reserve, Erica	E&DFA	1919	1947–1958	0	-	Disbanded after 1958 season
Haunted Hills		Lions		MYJFA	1909	1936–1938	1	1936	Became Moe Seconds after 1938 season
Hernes Oak		Swans		–	1936	1936–1940	0	-	Disbanded after 1940 season
Leongatha Seconds		Parrots	Leongatha Recreation Reserve, Leongatha	–	1894	1961–1964	0	-	Left the Mid Gippsland competition following the 1964 season.
Maryvale			Maryvale Paper Mill Oval, Maryvale	NGFNL	c.1950s	1966–1986	1	1968	Played its final season in 1986 and disbanded in early 1987.
Morwell Bridge				MYJFA	1930	1935–1955	0	-	Disbanded after 1955 season
Morwell Remnants				–	1946	1946–1947	0	-	Disbanded
Morwell Rovers						1950–1957	0	-	Disbanded
Morwell Seconds		Tigers	Morwell Recreation Reserve, Morwell	MYJFA	1883	1935–1946	3	1935, 1938, 1940	Disbanded after 1946 season
Trafalgar		Bloods	Trafalgar Recreation Reserve, Trafalgar	GL	1888	1969–2019	10	1975, 1984, 1991, 1992, 1994, 1995, 2009, 2010, 2012, 2018	Transfer to the Ellinbank & District Football Netball League was approved in 2020, with the club joining the competition for the 2021 season.
Yallourn Imperials				MYJFA		1935–1939	0	-	Disbanded after 1940 season
Yallourn North		Bombers	George Bates Reserve, Yallourn North	MYJFA	1919	1948–1976	3	1950, 1963, 1972	Merged with Yallourn in 1977 to form Yallourn Yallourn North.
Yallourn Yallourn North		Bombers	George Bates Reserve, Yallourn North	GL	1977	1984–2019	5	1986, 1987, 1993, 1996, 2019	Transfer to the North Gippsland Football Netball League was approved in 2020, with the club joining the competition for the 2021 season.
Yarragon	(1977–?)(?–2018)	Panthers, Yarras	Dowton Park Reserve, Yarragon	WGFL	1895	1977–2018	1	1977	Transferred to the Ellinbank & District Football Netball League for the 2019 season.

== Football ==
The league conducts senior, reserves and junior football competitions. Historical records for reserves and junior premierships and individual awards are maintained by the league, while the principal football records are summarised below.

=== Senior premiers ===
The following table lists the senior football premiers and grand final results. Historical results are drawn from league records and contemporary football archives.

Year	Premier	Score		Runner-up	Score
1935	Morwell Seconds	7.11 (53)	def.	Boolarra	4.7 (31)
1936	Haunted Hills	11.7 (73)	def.	Morwell Seconds	7.10 (52)
1937	Brown Coal Mine	9.3 (57)	def.	Morwell Bridge	7.10 (52)
1938	Morwell Seconds	8.10 (58)	def.	Morwell Bridge	7.9 (51)
1939	Yinnar	7.6 (48)	def.	Thorpdale	6.5 (41)
1940	Morwell Seconds	13.10 (88)	def.	Thorpdale	10.9 (69)
1941–1945	Competition interrupted during the Second World War				
1946	Thorpdale	18.20 (128)	def.	Yinnar	7.10 (52)
1947	Brown Coal Mine	13.14 (92)	def.	Thorpdale	11.13 (79)
1948	Hill End	12.11 (83)	def.	Thorpdale	11.13 (79)
1949	Hill End	8.11 (59)	def.	Thorpdale	7.9 (51)
1950	Yallourn North	5.10 (40)	def.	Morwell Bridge	5.9 (39)
1951	Hazelwood	7.12 (54)	def.	Thorpdale	7.6 (48)
1952	Hazelwood	14.10 (94)	def.	Yallourn North	11.9 (75)
1953	Hazelwood	9.8 (62)	def.	Yallourn North	3.10 (28)
1954	Yinnar	14.14 (98)	def.	Hazelwood	12.18 (90)
1955	Boolarra	11.16 (82)	def.	Mirboo North	11.14 (80)
1956	Mirboo North	17.15 (117)	def.	Dumbalk	11.12 (78)
1957	Mirboo North	13.17 (95)	def.	Hill End	8.6 (54)
1958	Boolarra	8.8 (56)	def.	Newborough	7.6 (48)
1959	Newborough	8.16 (64)	def.	Yinnar	1.11 (17)
1960	Thorpdale	15.11 (101)	def.	Yallourn North	4.6 (30)
1961	Thorpdale	10.11 (71)	def.	Yinnar	8.13 (61)
1962	Hill End	7.10 (52)	def.	Thorpdale	7.5 (47)
1963	Yallourn North	7.8 (50)	def.	Yinnar	5.12 (42)
1964	Yinnar	12.18 (90)	def.	Hazelwood	12.12 (84)
1965	Hazelwood	13.6 (84)	def.	Yinnar	9.21 (75)
1966	Hazelwood	13.11 (89)	def.	Thorpdale	10.13 (73)
1967	Yinnar	12.11 (83)	def.	Thorpdale	8.12 (60)
1968	Maryvale	15.20 (110)	def.	Thorpdale	12.8 (80)
1969	Yinnar	14.6 (90)	def.	Yallourn North	7.18 (60)
1970	Yinnar	15.6 (96)	def.	Yallourn North	14.6 (90)
1971	Yinnar	14.13 (97)	def.	Trafalgar	7.12 (54)
1972	Yallourn North	15.8 (98)	def.	Mirboo North	11.19 (85)
1973	Yinnar	16.9 (105)	def.	Hill End	12.12 (84)
1974	Hill End	12.24 (96)	def.	Newborough	7.12 (54)
1975	Trafalgar	13.15 (93)	def.	Newborough	10.10 (70)
1976	Thorpdale	17.9 (111)	def.	Newborough	14.16 (100)
1977	Yarragon	13.8 (86)	def.	Newborough	11.13 (79)
1978	Newborough	17.14 (116)	def.	Hazelwood Churchill	17.12 (114)
1979	Morwell East	17.19 (121)	def.	Hazelwood Churchill	11.11 (77)
1980	Morwell East	14.13 (97)	def.	Trafalgar	11.10 (76)
1981	Hill End	14.13 (97)	def.	Morwell East	13.15 (93)
1982	Churchill	24.23 (167)	def.	Hill End	8.10 (58)
1983	Churchill	11.11 (77)	def.	Trafalgar	9.16 (70)
1984	Trafalgar	32.13 (205)	def.	Morwell East	11.8 (74)
1985	Thorpdale	8.7 (55)	def.	Morwell East	5.11 (41)
1986	Yallourn Yallourn North	13.17 (95)	def.	Trafalgar	9.15 (69)
1987	Yallourn Yallourn North	13.5 (83)	def.	Thorpdale	11.12 (78)
1988	Newborough	13.22 (100)	def.	Trafalgar	8.14 (62)
1989	Newborough	11.6 (72)	def.	Trafalgar	8.17 (65)
1990	Newborough	12.12 (84)	def.	Trafalgar	9.14 (68)
1991	Trafalgar	20.18 (138)	def.	Mirboo North	13.15 (93)
1992	Trafalgar	4.7 (31)	def.	Thorpdale	2.5 (17)
1993	Yallourn Yallourn North	16.10 (106)	def.	Trafalgar	10.11 (71)
1994	Trafalgar	15.7 (97)	def.	Yallourn Yallourn North	15.6 (96)
1995	Trafalgar	13.16 (94)	def.	Yallourn Yallourn North	11.12 (78)
1996	Yallourn Yallourn North	7.7 (49)	def.	Trafalgar	5.16 (46)
1997	Boolarra	20.10 (130)	def.	Newborough	16.13 (109)
1998	Yinnar	12.11 (83)	def.	Newborough	7.12 (54)
1999	Newborough	13.7 (85)	def.	Yinnar	7.11 (53)
2000	Newborough	17.14 (116)	def.	Yinnar	9.9 (63)
2001	Yinnar	14.18 (102)	def.	Trafalgar	10.10 (70)
2002	Newborough	11.13 (79)	def.	Trafalgar	11.8 (74)
2003	Newborough	8.6 (54)	def.	Trafalgar	6.12 (48)
2004	Yinnar	5.10 (40)	def.	Mirboo North	2.3 (15)
2005	Morwell East	11.5 (71)	def.	Mirboo North	6.8 (44)
2006	Mirboo North	10.8 (68)	def.	Morwell East	1.3 (9)
2007	Mirboo North	11.18 (84)	def.	Yinnar	11.7 (73)
2008	Yinnar	10.9 (69)	def.	Mirboo North	5.11 (41)
2009	Trafalgar	16.8 (104)	def.	Morwell East	7.5 (47)
2010	Trafalgar	13.19 (97)	def.	Morwell East	6.10 (46)
2011	Boolarra	13.4 (82)	def.	Trafalgar	8.5 (53)
2012	Trafalgar	10.3 (63)	def.	Newborough	8.8 (56)
2013	Mirboo North	10.9 (69)	def.	Newborough	9.11 (65)
2014	Mirboo North	12.15 (87)	def.	Newborough	13.8 (86)
2015	Yinnar	14.9 (93)	def.	Yallourn Yallourn North	11.7 (73)
2016	Newborough	12.15 (87)	def.	Yallourn Yallourn North	5.16 (46)
2017	Mirboo North	5.12 (42)	def.	Yinnar	5.10 (40)
2018	Trafalgar	12.12 (84)	def.	Yinnar	9.14 (68)
2019	Yallourn Yallourn North	9.16 (70)	def.	Hill End	5.8 (38)
2020	No competition due to the COVID-19 pandemic				
2021	No premiership awarded				
2022	Yinnar	8.9 (57)	def.	Newborough	5.7 (37)
2023	Fish Creek	9.12 (66)	def.	Newborough	5.8 (38)
2024	Fish Creek	7.4 (46)	def.	Yinnar	6.8 (44)
2025	Foster	12.7 (79)	def.	Fish Creek	9.14 (68)
2026	Fish Creek	18.11 (119)	def.	Foster	16.11 (107)

=== Elder-Berwick Medal ===
The league's senior football best-and-fairest award is the George Elder-Berwick Medal. The award is named after George Elder-Berwick, the league's inaugural president, and was named in his honour in 1946. Historical league records list senior best-and-fairest winners from 1935 onward.

Year	Winner	Club
1935	Albert Meyer	Boolarra
1936	Robert Thorburn	Boolarra
1937	Tom Hill	Thorpdale
1938	Percy Palmer	Haunted Hills
1939	Graham Vary	Morwell Bridge
1940	Albert McDonald	Morwell Bridge
1946	Tom Jennings	Thorpdale
1947	Keith Shields / Hayden Davey	Brown Coal Mine Imperials / Morwell Remnants
1948	Arthur Robbins	Boolarra
1949	Tom Jennings	Thorpdale
1950	George Card	Yallourn North
1951	Cyril Metcalf	Morwell Rovers
1952	Ken Davis	Hazelwood
1953	Tom O'Callaghan	Morwell Rovers
1954	Cyril Metcalf	Morwell Bridge
1955	Stan Glossop	Morwell Bridge
1956	Stan Glossop	Morwell Bridge
1957	Kevin Fanning	Newborough
1958	Kevin Fanning	Newborough
1959	Vivian Gore	Yallourn North
1960	Norm Cook	Yallourn North
1961	Colin O'Brien	Hill End
1962	William Anderson	Hazelwood
1963	Len Hayes	Yallourn North
1964	John Wilde	Hill End
1965	Jim Fry	Yallourn North
1966	Reg Bacon	Hill End
1967	Reg Bacon	Hill End
1968	Robert Moncur / Barry Rowlings	Thorpdale
1969	John Burleigh	Thorpdale
1970	Ron Skinner	Newborough
1971	Tadd Regulski / Gary Masters	Thorpdale / Hill End
1972	Ken Jennings	Hazelwood Churchill
1973	Ken Jennings / Richard Cugley	Hazelwood Churchill / Maryvale
1974	Ken Jennings	Hazelwood Churchill
1975	Ray Decarli / William Slater / Peter Ludlow	Yallourn North / Trafalgar / Hazelwood Churchill
1976	Peter Ludlow	Hazelwood Churchill
1977	Ken Healey	Morwell East
1978	Charlie Cauchi	Morwell East
1979	Michael Lovison / Robert Nash	Trafalgar / Mirboo North
1980	Michael Henshall	Yarragon
1981	Steven Michaelides	Morwell East
1982	John Kimberley	Thorpdale
1983	Steven Michaelides / Bernie Noy	Morwell East / Yarragon
1984	Steven Michaelides / Ray York	Morwell East / Thorpdale
1985	Gary Milroy	Trafalgar
1986	Glen Roberts	Yarragon
1987	Bruce Clark / Wayne Paulet / Michael Hutchinson	Mirboo North / Yallourn Yallourn North / Newborough
1988	Brad Shaw	Boolarra
1989	Brian Sim	Trafalgar
1990	Bruce Clark	Mirboo North
1991	Shane Webster	Yarragon
1992	Peter Doherty	Mirboo North
1993	Brad Paulet / Grant Warfe	Yallourn Yallourn North / Newborough
1994	Craig Skinner	Newborough
1995	Aaron Green	Yarragon
1996	Paul Algar	Yarragon
1997	Paul Anderson	Morwell East
1998	Paul Anderson	Morwell East
1999	Paul Anderson	Morwell East
2000	Paul Roberts / Gary Blanford	Yinnar / Trafalgar
2001	Guy Cheffers	Yinnar
2002	Anthony Magnuson	Newborough
2003	Shane Peters	Mirboo North
2004	Chris Day	Mirboo North
2005	Daryl Disisto	Newborough
2006	Liam Visser	Yinnar
2007	Barrie Burnett	Yallourn Yallourn North
2008	Don Webb	Mirboo North
2009	Ben Damschke	Yarragon
2010	Ben Damschke	Yarragon
2011	Matthew Dyer	Boolarra
2012	Michael Farrell	Trafalgar
2013	James Dowling	Yinnar
2014	Daniel Risol	Newborough
2015	Thomas Hutton	Yallourn Yallourn North
2016	Andrew Brown	Morwell East
2017	Michael Geary	Yinnar
2018	Jared Risol	Newborough
2019	Jack Hudson	Hill End
2020	No competition	
2021	Amburupa Uliando	Hill End
2022	Ricky Cochrane / Thomas Cameron	Boolarra / Fish Creek
2023	Ben Cheffers	Yinnar
2024	Brad Kimberley	Morwell East
2025	Angus Norton	Foster
2026	Jackson Weidemann / Jack Weston	Fish Creek / Foster

=== Leading goalkickers ===
The senior leading goalkicker is determined from goals kicked during the home-and-away season. Finals and total season tallies are included where available.

Year	Player	Club	H&A goals	Finals goals	Total goals
1947	Keith Shields	Brown Coal Mine Imperials	103	7	110
1948	Bill Tuena	Thorpdale	66	7	73
1949	Frank Sartori	Hazelwood	35	5	40
1950	S. Lestrange	Morwell Bridge	68	4	72
1951	Frank Sartori	Hazelwood	50	6	56
1952	Frank Sartori	Hazelwood	32	8	40
1953	D. Cook	Yallourn North	45	5	50
1954	Stirling	Thorpdale	61	2	63
1955	Alan Mathieson	Yinnar	92	2	94
1956	Keith Peacock	Mirboo North	122	8	130
1957	Keith Peacock	Mirboo North	140	10	150
1958	Not listed	—	—	—	—
1959	Not listed	—	—	—	—
1960	Not listed	—	—	—	—
1961	Not listed	—	—	—	—
1962	Not listed	—	—	—	—
1963	Not listed	—	—	—	—
1964	Sanders	Yallourn North	49	8	57
1965	Graham Cranwell	Hazelwood	—	6	—
1966	Graham Cranwell	Hazelwood	39	3	42
1967	Graham Cranwell	Hazelwood	88	2	90
1968	Peter Rennie	Yinnar	58	3	61
1969	Alan Snell	Mirboo North	76	0	76
1970	Rob Hutchinson	Yallourn North	59	5	64
1971	Not listed	—	—	—	—
1972	Not listed	—	—	—	—
1973	Joe Makowski	Maryvale	105	0	105
1974	Joe Makowski	Maryvale	106	10	116
1975	Ian Jennings	Thorpdale	91	0	91
1976	Ian Jennings	Thorpdale	136	12	148
1977	Peter Brumellen	Newborough	100	11	111
1978	Peter Brumellen	Newborough	47	14	61
1979	Jim Rasmussen	Morwell East	88	14	102
1980	Dan O'Donnell	Morwell East	109	4	113
1981	Jim Rasmussen	Morwell East	66	7	73
1982	Jim Rasmussen	Morwell East	96	0	96
1983	Steve Sanders	Churchill	79	9	88
1984	Bruce Chalmers	Trafalgar	42	7	49
1985	Graeme Rowlings	Thorpdale	100	5	105
1986	Not listed	—	—	—	—
1987	Ian Gray	Trafalgar	80	0	80
1988	Steve Sanders	Newborough	111	9	120
1989	Steve Sanders	Newborough	107	0	107
1990	Royce Wilkins	Mirboo North	83	5	88
1991	Shane McGrath	Trafalgar	95	10	105
1992	Shane McGrath	Trafalgar	114	7	121
1993	Alan Wright	Yallourn Yallourn North	91	3	94
1994	Sean Julin	Boolarra	78	0	78
1995	Brett Mayo	Yinnar	81	12	93
1996	Brett Hughes	Yallourn Yallourn North	92	17	109
1997	Sean Julin	Boolarra	64	21	85
1998	Nick Lecchino	Morwell East	124	0	124
1999	Glen Michie	Newborough	108	7	115
2000	D. Edwards	Morwell East	75	0	75
2001	M. Hoiles	Trafalgar	60	1	61
2002	Not listed	—	—	—	—
2003	Not listed	—	—	—	—
2004	Timothy Triall	Mirboo North	119	0	119
2005	Colin Gibson-Williamson	Morwell East	68	1	69
2006	Timothy Triall	Mirboo North	113	23	136
2007	Timothy Triall	Mirboo North	104	0	104
2008	Tim Phillips	Yallourn Yallourn North	65	0	65
2009	Timothy Triall	Mirboo North	79	3	82
2010	Matthew Robertson	Trafalgar	61	0	61
2011	Timothy Triall	Mirboo North	66	10	76
2012	Timothy Triall	Mirboo North	77	2	79
2013	Timothy Triall	Mirboo North	101	4	105
2014	Timothy Triall	Mirboo North	79	13	92
2015	Tim Phillips	Yallourn Yallourn North	59	5	64
2016	Dean Macdonald	Yallourn Yallourn North	73	11	84
2017	Chase Saunders	Boolarra	55	0	55
2018	Dean Macdonald	Yallourn Yallourn North	94	7	101
2019	Keenan Hughes	Yallourn Yallourn North	78	6	84
2020	No competition due to the COVID-19 pandemic				
2021	Joel Mitchell	Newborough	43	—	43
2022	Cooper McInnes	Tarwin	67	4	71
2023	Matthew Powell	Thorpdale	61	2	63
2024	Chris Wangman	Morwell East	78	0	78
2025	Jake Best	Foster	77	7	84
2026	Brett Eddy	Foster	80	16	96

An em dash indicates that the relevant figure is not available from the historical record used for the table. A zero indicates a recorded tally of no goals during the finals series.

=== League records ===
Record	Mark	Record holder	Year
Highest score	324 points	Morwell East — 48.36 (324) v Mirboo North	1980
Most goals in a match	23	Alan Mathieson (Yinnar) v Erica	1955
Most goals in a season	150	Keith Peacock (Mirboo North)	1957
Most consecutive premierships	3	Hazelwood	1951–1953
Most consecutive premierships	3	Yinnar	1969–1971
Most consecutive premierships	3	Newborough	1988–1990
Most consecutive wins	59	Hazelwood	1951–1954
Most consecutive losses	49	Boolarra	1989–1992

== Netball ==
Netball was administered separately by the Mid Gippsland Netball Association (MGNA) until November 2019, when it amalgamated with the Mid Gippsland Football League to form the Mid Gippsland Football Netball League. Life members of the former MGNA were subsequently incorporated into the MGFNL's life membership records.

The MGFNL currently conducts seven netball grades. The four open-age competitions are A Grade, B Grade, C Grade and D Grade, while junior competitions are conducted at 17 & Under, 15 & Under and 13 & Under levels. The league and its member clubs are affiliated with Netball Victoria.

=== A Grade premiers ===
The league's surviving historical records list A Grade premiers from 1980 onward. Grand final scores and runners-up are included where available.

Year	Premier	Score	Runner-up	Reference
1980	Yinnar	—	—	
1981	Not listed	—	—	
1982	Mirboo North	—	—	
1983	Trafalgar	—	—	
1984	Trafalgar	—	—	
1985	Yinnar	—	—	
1986	Trafalgar	—	—	
1987	Not listed	—	—	
1988	Trafalgar	—	—	
1989	Yarragon	—	—	
1990	Yarragon	—	—	
1991	Yinnar	—	—	
1992	Yinnar	—	—	
1993	Mirboo North	—	—	
1994	Yinnar	—	—	
1995	Yinnar	—	—	
1996	Trafalgar	—	—	
1997	Trafalgar	—	—	
1998	Thorpdale	—	—	
1999	Mirboo North	—	—	
2000	Mirboo North	—	—	
2001	Yinnar	—	—	
2002	Trafalgar	—	—	
2003	Yinnar	—	—	
2004	Morwell East	—	—	
2005	Thorpdale	—	—	
2006	Morwell East	—	—	
2007	Thorpdale	—	—	
2008	Mirboo North	—	—	
2009	Morwell East	—	—	
2010	Morwell East	—	—	
2011	Thorpdale	—	—	
2012	Morwell East	39–37	Mirboo North	
2013	Morwell East	—	Boolarra	
2014	Mirboo North	—	Boolarra	
2015	Mirboo North	—	—	
2016	Thorpdale	47–34	Mirboo North	
2017	Trafalgar	40–37	Morwell East	
2018	Newborough	—	Thorpdale	
2019	Yinnar	41–38	Trafalgar	
2020	No competition due to the COVID-19 pandemic			
2021	No premiership awarded			
2022	Toora	45–44	Mirboo North	
2023	Yinnar	46–41	Toora	
2024	Meeniyan Dumbalk United	39–37	Fish Creek	
2025	Meeniyan Dumbalk United	55–41	Foster	
2026	Foster	63–29	Yinnar	

An em dash indicates that a grand final score or runner-up has not yet been verified from an available reliable source. The league's historical records do not list an A Grade premier for 1981 or 1987.
