= Boisdale, Victoria =

Boisdale
- Town
- Coordinates: 37°53′S 146°59′E
- Country: Australia
- State: Victoria
- LGA: Shire of Wellington
- Location: 176 km (109 mi) E of Melbourne; 27 km (17 mi) N of Sale; 9 km (5.6 mi) N of Maffra; 11 km (6.8 mi) SW of Briagolong

Government
  - State electorate: Gippsland East
  - Federal division: Gippsland

Area
  - Total: 78.4 km^{2} (30.3 sq mi)

Population
  - Total: 275 (2016 census)
  - Density: 3.508/km^{2} (9.085/sq mi)
- Postcode: 3860

Boisdale is a town in the Central Gippsland region of Victoria, Australia, located on Briagolong Road, north of Maffra, in the Shire of Wellington. At the 2016 census, Boisdale and the surrounding area had a population of 275. It is a small town in the heart of Gippsland's dairying distinct. Boisdale includes not only the town itself, but the area surrounding the town, comprising mostly dairy and vegetable farms. It is situated approximately 9 km north of the larger town of Maffra. Boisdale is 176 km east of Australia's second largest city, Melbourne, the capital of Victoria.

== History ==
Boisdale was the run of pioneer grazier Lachlan Macalister and was named after the village on the island of South Uist in the Outer Hebrides, Scotland. In the 1840s and 1850s, Boisdale was the local headquarters of the Native Police in the Gippsland region. This force would set out from their barracks, patrol the area and conduct punitive raids on various clans of the Gunai people. Macalister's run, being the immediate area around the barracks, was one of the sites of mass aboriginal fatalities due to the Native Police.

Boisdale Post Office opened on 24 September 1889. From 1889, the Briagolong railway line ran through Boisdale, with a railway station in the town that existed primarily for freighting sugar beet and firewood. The line, and thus the railway station, closed in 1952. Boisdale has a primary school, Boisdale Consolidated School, a local post office, general store, mechanic, sporting facilities and the Boisdale Hall, which dates back over a century in age. The town in conjunction with neighbouring township Briagolong has an Australian Rules football team Boisdale-Briagolong competing in the East Gippsland Football League.
