= Swan Reach, Victoria =

Swan Reach
- Town
- Interactive map of Swan Reach
- Coordinates: 37°50′0″S 147°52′0″E
- Country: Australia
- State: Victoria
- LGA: Shire of East Gippsland
- Location: 306 km (190 mi) E of Melbourne; 25 km (16 mi) E of Bairnsdale; 18 km (11 mi) NW of Lakes Entrance

Government
  - State electorate: Gippsland East
  - Federal division: Gippsland

Population
  - Total: 751 (2016 census)
- Postcode: 3903

Swan Reach is a town in the Shire of East Gippsland, Victoria Australia. It is situated 306 kilometres (190 mi) east of the state capital, Melbourne and is located approximately halfway between the townships of Bairnsdale and Lakes Entrance on the Tambo River. Swan Reach falls under the jurisdiction of the Shire of East Gippsland local government area. According to the 2016 Australian Census Swan Reach and the surrounding area had a population of 751 people.

The region did not have much population until the establishment of sawmills on the Tambo River between 1864 and 1870. With the influx of settlers, farming, dairy and cheese factory came into being. In 1875, the Tambo school was established and later hotels and shops were set up in the area.

Swan Reach Post Office opened on 1 February 1880. It was known from around 1906 to around 1911 as Swan Reach West in anticipation of a surveyed Swan Reach township to the east being established.

Nearly everyone currently residing in Swan Reach was born in Australia and they speak predominantly English. Religion is not very diverse with 100% of residents being Christian or subscribing to no religion.

Swan Reach has one pub, one petrol station, and one general store. These are all located on the Princes Highway, which runs through the centre of the town and forms the main road.

== Sports ==
Swan Reach also has an oval and netball court, with an Australian Rules football team and netball teams competing in the Omeo & District Football League.

The town's hockey club plays in the East Gippsland Hockey Association, although they have played their home games for the past few seasons in the nearby town of Lakes Entrance.
