= Johnsonville, Victoria =

Johnsonville
- Town
- Coordinates: 37°49′0″S 147°50′0″E
- Country: Australia
- State: Victoria
- LGA: Shire of East Gippsland
- Location: 300 km (190 mi) from Melbourne; 18.9 km (11.7 mi) from Bairnsdale; 18.3 km (11.4 mi) from Lakes Entrance
- Established: 1857

Government
  - State electorate: Gippsland East
  - Federal division: Gippsland
- Elevation: 32.8 m (108 ft)

Population
  - Total: 327 (2016 census)
- Postcode: 3902

Johnsonville is a town in the East Gippsland region of Victoria, Australia. It is located on the Princes Highway 18.9 km east from the city of Bairnsdale and 18.3 km west from the tourist resort and fishing port of Lakes Entrance. The town encompasses an area of approximately 5,617 hectares, 56 square kilometres or 13,879 acres.

Johnsonville forms one of the 224 cities, towns, villages and localities included within the scope of the East Gippsland Shire directive. The local member for the East Gippsland Region is Tim Bull. At the 2016 census, Johnsonville had a population of 327.

== History ==
Johnsonville Punt around the 1880s

The original inhabitants of the land were the Indigenous Australians, in particular the Gunai people who inhabited the region as far east as the Snowy River. The township got its name from John Johnson, a man of Scandinavian origins, who purchased the nearby Swan Reach run in 1857 which also encompassed Johnsonville and surrounding areas. Johnson was a popular public figure of his time, serving three years as the member for Gippsland in the Legislative Assembly.

He had previously owned Mewburn Park located near Maffra, which is incidentally linked to the famous Tichborne case. Arthur Orton had answered Johnson's advertisement early in 1855 calling for splitters, fence riders and stock-riders on his Mewburn Park station. Johnson's agents subsequently signed Aurthur up as a stockrider after he shipped out aboard Johnson's Eclipse from Van Diemen's Land.

Previous to Johnson's claim upon the land Octavius Batten Sparkes occupied 16,000 acres and drove 4,000 sheep.

Early settlers in the vicinity included the Howlett's, Dalhsens, Roadknight's and many others.

The onslaught of selection in the 1860s seen an end to the pastoral era and the aptly named ‘Squatter Kingdoms’. Fences were erected and small land owners took control. However, following the Victorian gold rush the Duffy Act in 1862 made small freehold selection possible. The selection of parts of the Swan Reach run which form the Johnsonville area took place around 1870.

Deriving its name from the punts that used to operate along the river carrying supplies in the late 1800s and the early 20th century and leading from the Princes Highway, is Punt Road, which is the town's auxiliary byway that leads directly to the banks of the Tambo River. The road physically ends at the river but its name extends across the water and finishes where it intercepts Metung road. The first punt service along the river was established in 1877 by Frederick Smith and in 1886 was taken over by the Tambo Shire.

Nearly two decades prior, on 13 April 1858, Malcolm Cambell made the first and historically significant crossing of the Lakes Entrance with the 70 tonne Georgiana Smith. Shortly afterwards he took the boat up the Tambo River.

In 1864 another boat called the Lady Darling was constructed at McArdell's sawmills. It was a 245 tonne three mastered schooner and was launched on the Tambo River with the intention of it being sailed to Melbourne. Due to an inexperienced crew the vessel became beached and later rescued at substantial cost. The joint owners were John Inglis, storekeeper, and William Gutherie, a miller, both of North Gippsland. She was sold to John Hughes, of Williamstown, one year later and in 1873 to R.J. Jeffrey's, a merchant of Melbourne who sold her to a Brisbane owner three years later. She was wrecked in the New Hebrides in 1881.

In the 1880s the traffic along the river increased, and in 1886 David Munro and Co. used timber barges to carry milled logs down from Upper Tambo to Johnsonville or, as it was known then, Lower Tambo. This small inland port formed one of five busy wharves along the length of the river.

Farming methods in 1800s

In the earlier years, except the usual farm implements, there was no labour-saving machinery. The crops were all reaped by hand with the sickle and usually 12 or 15 reapers were employed cutting the crop. When reaped, the crop was carted and stacked in the barnyard and afterwards the grain was threshed out on the barn floor with flails. In the last year (1864) my father obtained a small two-horse power threshing machine, which did good work. The motive power was furnished by two horses working abreast in a kind of treadmill.

— Henry Hopkins, Biography of David Burchell Hopkins and his wife, Sarah Jane

Around the 1880s the areas main produce came in the form of farming and crops included wheat, oats, potatoes, barley, maize and hops. The Hop Kilns that serviced the area are still standing at Mossiface on the flats of the Tambo River and adjacent to the East Gippsland Rail Trail. The nearby township of Bruthen was the centre of one of Australia's leading tobacco growing areas with Charles Seehusen being the innovator of this crop.

In 1878 a track was cleared from the Nicholson Punt to Foley's selection at Johnsonville, giving access Bairnsdale. That same year Henry Howlett commenced marking and clearing a road from Swan Reach to Lakes Entrance, but it wasn't until the early 1880s that locals in the area actually made use of it. Edward Foley set up coach service and also established the first mail run from Bairnsdale to Lakes entrance using Packhorses.

Following on from the industrial activity the mid-1880s saw the township at Johnsonville established. Early maps show that the original location for the town was set to be about 1 mile west of its current location, but possibly owing to the fact to its having grown from the original river settlement down Punt Road, the township centred there.

In 1892 Johsonville saw the first congregational church established in the East Gippsland region. It has been assigned the Parish number 5400 by the Victorian Department of Crown Lands and Survey. The Johnsonville Post Office opened on 16 September 1886 with a Mr. John Smith as the postmaster.

One of the first businesses to be founded was a large Coach building, Blacksmith and Wheelwright establishment owned by William Froud. In 1934 the Blacksmith business was converted to the general store with a bake house at the rear.

=== War effort ===
Historical records show nine Anzacs that were born in Johnsonville and that served in the Australian Imperial Force. These include George Charles Batten, John Francis Batten, Frederick Elijah Burt, Jack Ledan Burt, Douglas William Hepburn, Charles Victor Kilmartin, James Leslie Smith, William Francis Stephenson and Frank Stanley Wills.

== Tambo River ==
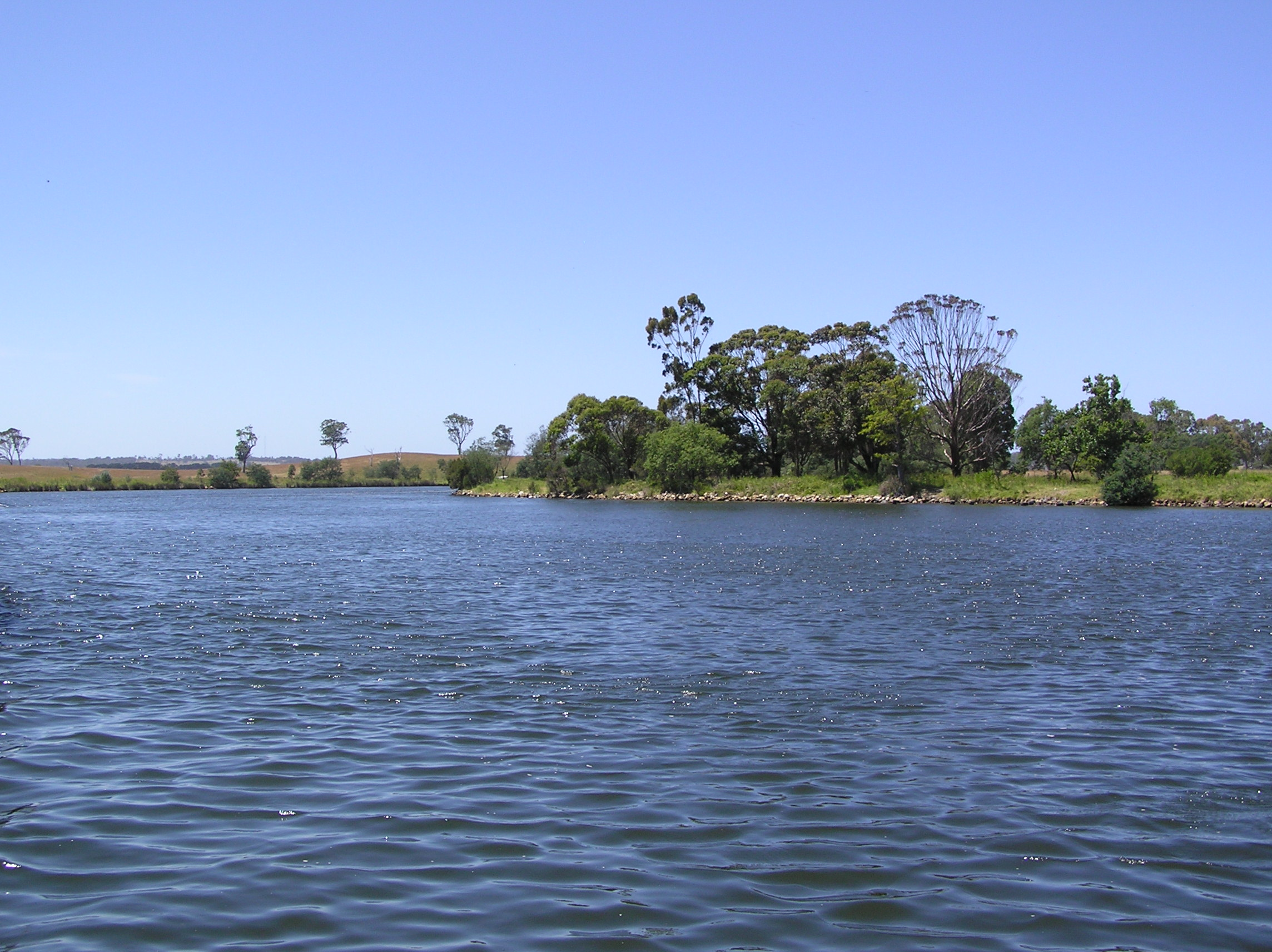
The Tambo River at the Johnsonville junction

Beginning in the Eastern Highlands, which is one of the three major landforms in Australia, the other two being the Central Lowlands and the Western Plateau, the Tambo River passes Johnsonville at approximately 5 km from its mouth. The Tambo River is just one of seven rivers that flow into the lakes, marshes and lagoons of the Gippsland Lakes system. The other rivers include Latrobe, Avon, Nicholson, Mitchell, Macalister and Thomson rivers. The river flows south and stretches 186 km which makes it only second in length to the Latrobe at 270 km. The mouth of the Tambo River is a tidal estuarine system with a salt wedge that extends 3 km up the river from Lake King

Johnsonville is considered part of the 'twin rivers' of the Tambo and Nicholson Rivers. In 1856 it would appear that the nomenclature of the river was in dispute given that Pawel Strzelecki named the Tambo River as it is now known – The Thompson, after Sir Edward Deas Thompson who was Colonial Secretary of New South Wales.

=== Recreation ===
Johnsonville is a highly tourist-based area that hosts the Twin Rivers Bream Classic - an annual fishing event. Despite the naming of the event other fish species inhabit the Tambo River system, these include; Bass, Mullet, Flathead, Garfish, Perch, Eels, Brown-trout and the introduced and much maligned Common carp. The range of baits used by recreational fishermen includes mussels, sandworm, white pilchards, blue sprats, crabs, prawns, pipis and soft plastics. A Recreational Fishing Licence (RFL) is compulsory unless you are exempt and covers, all forms of recreational fishing in all of Victoria's marine, estuarine and freshwaters.

=== Hydrology ===
In 2004 a large research project was set up to investigate the movement patterns of Black Bream throughout the Gippsland Lakes system. The study showed that the fish swam up and down the Tambo River almost daily and frequently entered the Lakes.

Following the Alpine fires in 2003 that burnt over a million hectares in Eastern Victoria including parts of the Tambo River, a study was conducted by the Monash School of Chemistry to investigate changes in hydrology within the river system and further develop the understanding of how bushfire contaminates affect water-bodies. The mouth of the river was cited as a source of aggregation for the bushfire sediments and ash. Carbon particles were detected in sediment samples taken at the river's mouth.

The Third Index of Stream Condition report prepared by the Department of Environment and Primary industries found that within individual catchments, 73% of stream length in the Far East Gippsland basin was in excellent condition and there were no streams in poor or very poor condition in either the Tambo or Far East Gippsland basins. Since 1997 The Tambo River and others in East Gippsland have been the responsibility of the East Gippsland Catchment Management Authority and the Lower Tambo Landcare Group.

== Water supply ==
Sarsfield Storage Basin is a 160 ML earthen, rock beached storage. Water harvested from the Mitchell River at Glenaladale is transferred to this storage and used to supply the townships of Sarsfield, Bruthen, Nicholson, Johnsonville, Swan Reach, Metung, and Lakes Entrance. The water is disinfected using chlorine gas at the outlet of the storage.

East Gippsland Water's service area spans 21,000 square kilometers and services more than 24,800 customers along nine separate water supply systems. It extends east from Lindenow, through to the region's capital Bairnsdale, the holiday centres of Paynesville and Lakes Entrance, and on to the wilderness coast and Mallacoota near the New South Wales border. The drinking water for these communities is drawn at a rate of up to 350 litres per second (35 megalitres a day), and pumped into storage at Woodglen 2.5 km away. This is the initial storage point for all water supplied to the Mitchell system customers.

Approximately 95 per cent of all the recycled water produced by Bairnsdale Wastewater Treatment Plant each year is used to help sustain and protect the biodiversity of the internationally significant Macleod Morass near Bairnsdale and Tambo Bay Wetlands on the basin of the Tambo River.

Incidentally, East Gippsland Water is one of the best performing water corporations in Victoria when it comes to recycling water, achieving a reuse level of 99% from its wastewater treatment plants and often reaching 100%.

== Primary school ==
Due to the number of children that were present within the growing community the need for a school was becoming a pressing matter. A hall was built by the locals in 1886 on land donated by Mr. Frederick Smith with a view for it to be predominantly a learning facility.

However, prior to this on 23 October 1884 a petition was forwarded to the Educational Department by the residents of Bumberrah requesting the establishment of a school at Lower Tambo Punt. By October 1885 no action had been taken and a deputation signed by local residents was passed to the Minister of Public Instruction.

With requests evidently denied or ignored the residents were proactive and constructed a building measuring 30 feet by 16 feet and made written requests to the Educational Department for the fitment of furniture and a teacher.

The school commenced operating on 17 July 1886 with Emily Moffat as the head teacher overseeing the education of some 30 children; by 1889 the number of students grew to 53. Conversely a significant drop in attendance took place in 1891 owing to a river punt being temporarily out of service.

Through a set of convoluted and tedious circumstances that were predominantly headed by outbreaks of whooping cough and measles resulting from an apparent case of Sick building syndrome as a consequence of the general disrepair of the community-built school structure, as well as the depression of the 1890s and red tape in dealing with the parties responsible for school maintenance; a new building to accommodate 60 students was finally constructed in 1900 by McKnockier Brothers at the cost of £278.

The teacher's residence was acquired in 1952 and to this day still sits adjacent to the fire station. Over the years the school underwent many structural changes. In 1984 the building was again in need of maintenance. As a result, in the following year the school received a new two part modular building that was located at the rear of the block behind the original building.

The school celebrated its centenary in 1986 and was attended by the then Minister for Education Ian Cathie. A time capsule containing art work and essays by the students at that time was buried on the school grounds. It's scheduled to be opened in the year 2036.

112 years after its opening, 1998 saw the school shut down due to dwindling student numbers and no sign of enrolments for the following year. The large oak trees that were iconic to the school still sit on the property, which has now become a private residence. Most of the infrastructure was disseminated to other schools in the district. The original school building was moved to Lakes Entrance in 2000 and now houses The Lakes Entrance Regional Historical Society

A few known notable associations with the school include former pupil Lesley I. Oldfield (née Martin), who was mayor of Alice Springs from 1983 to 1992. And Mr. W. Armstrong, who was head teacher from 1907 to 1914, played in a Victorian country team against the touring English team of that time.

== Johnsonville Hall ==
The Johnsonville hall for a long time has been famous for the dances held there. These were the inspiration for Slim Dusty's song "The Johnsonville Dance" from his 1988 album, "G'day G'day".

== Local business ==
Given that the township is relatively small, there a few business's located in the immediate area. The general store and the petrol station are among the original establishments of the town and are still in operation but over the years there has been demand for tourism based operations, as well as orchards and a large boat storage facility.

=== Caravan park ===
The 'Bell Bird' under construction at Johnsonville

The Lealow caravan park that is situated on the Tambo River was initially farm land. It was originally owned by a Mr. George Frazer who run a sawmilling operation from that location, and then in 1905 he started a boat repair works and employed Captain Jimmy McCallum as a shipwright.

He constructed five small vessels, giving them names Storm Bird, War Hawk, Warratah, Sea Bird, and in 1906 he built the Bellbird, which was taken to New Zealand in 1907. Mr. Frazer eventually settled in New Zealand, and his farm was subsequently purchased by Mr. Augustine Clues, whose family still owns the property. 'Clues Road' that runs adjacent to the boat ramp is named after a Mr. Harry Clues.

=== Bream Lodge ===
Bream Lodge was built in 1984 by Bill and Pauline Fitzgerald who run it until 1988. They had previously run a general store and Bakery in the nearby town of Bruthen in the early 1970s. Bream Lodge mainly catered to fishermen and angling clubs from as far away as New South Wales and Melbourne. The original layout consisted of five brick units, with one having to be partially rebuilt after a car ran through the front. Over the years it has since been extended to include detached buildings at the rear of the property, and the clientele has grown to include rowing teams from Melbourne who use it as a base while they train on the Tambo River at various points throughout the year.

== Gallery ==
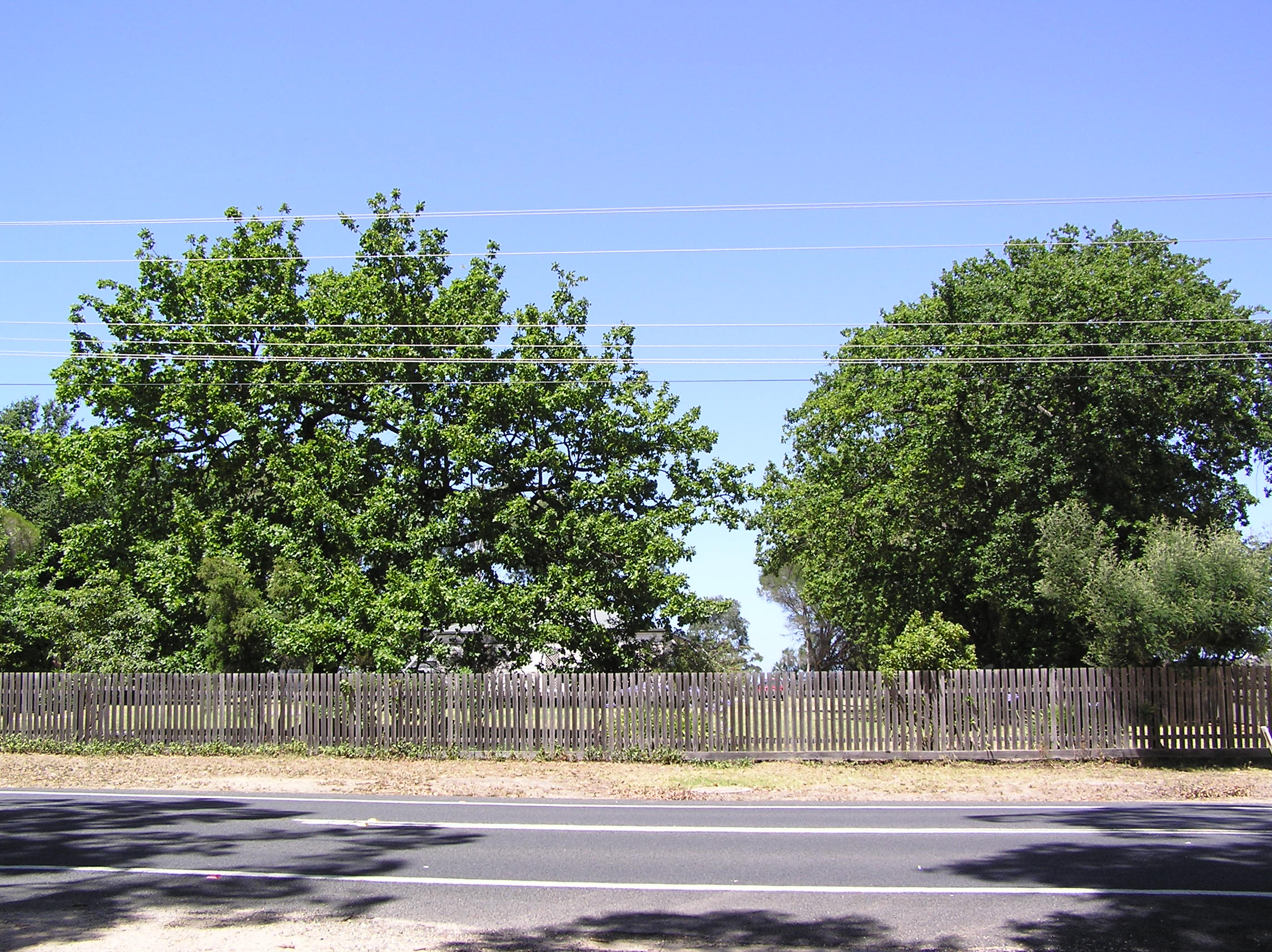
Previous site of the Primary School

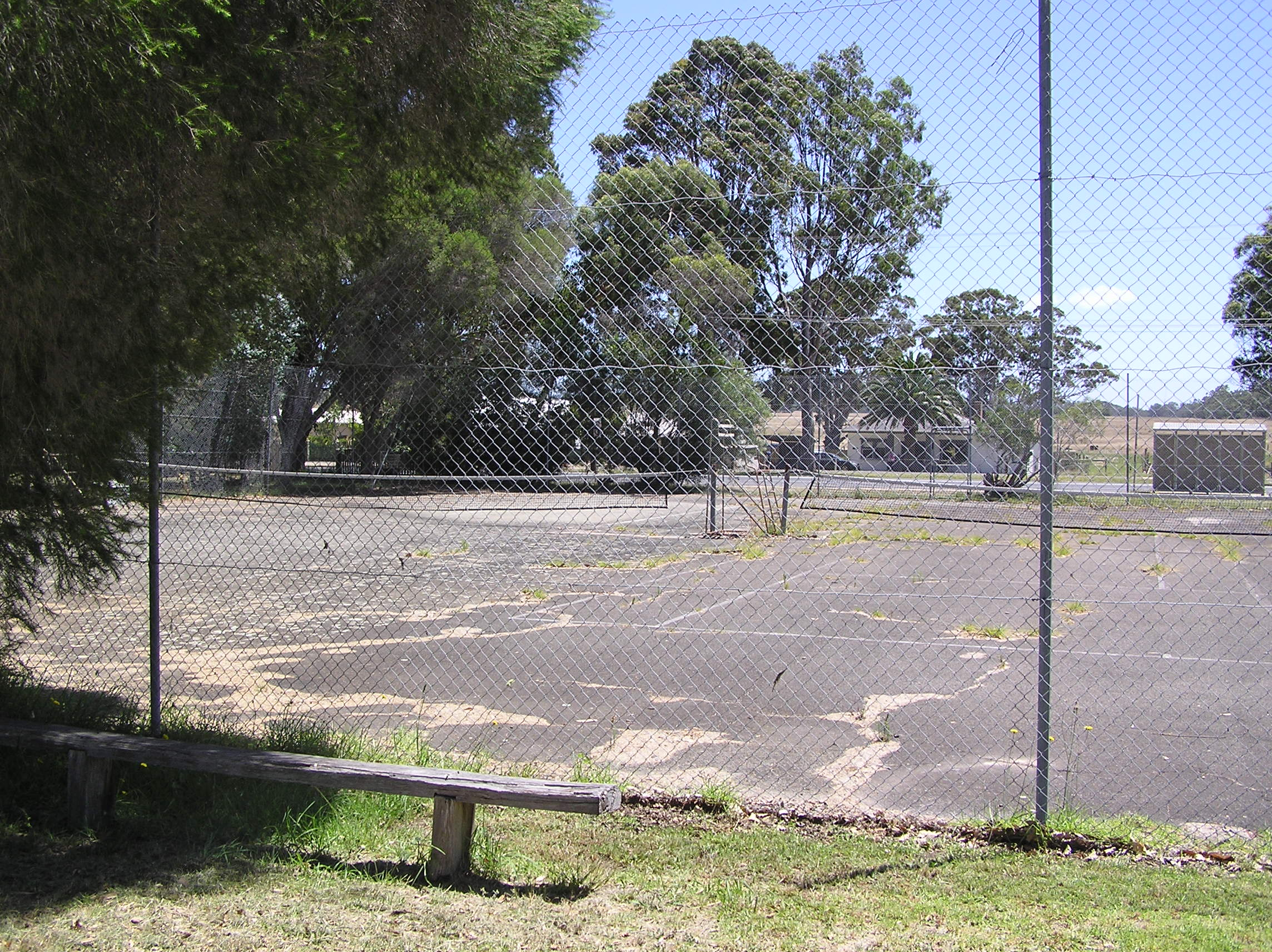
Tennis Courts

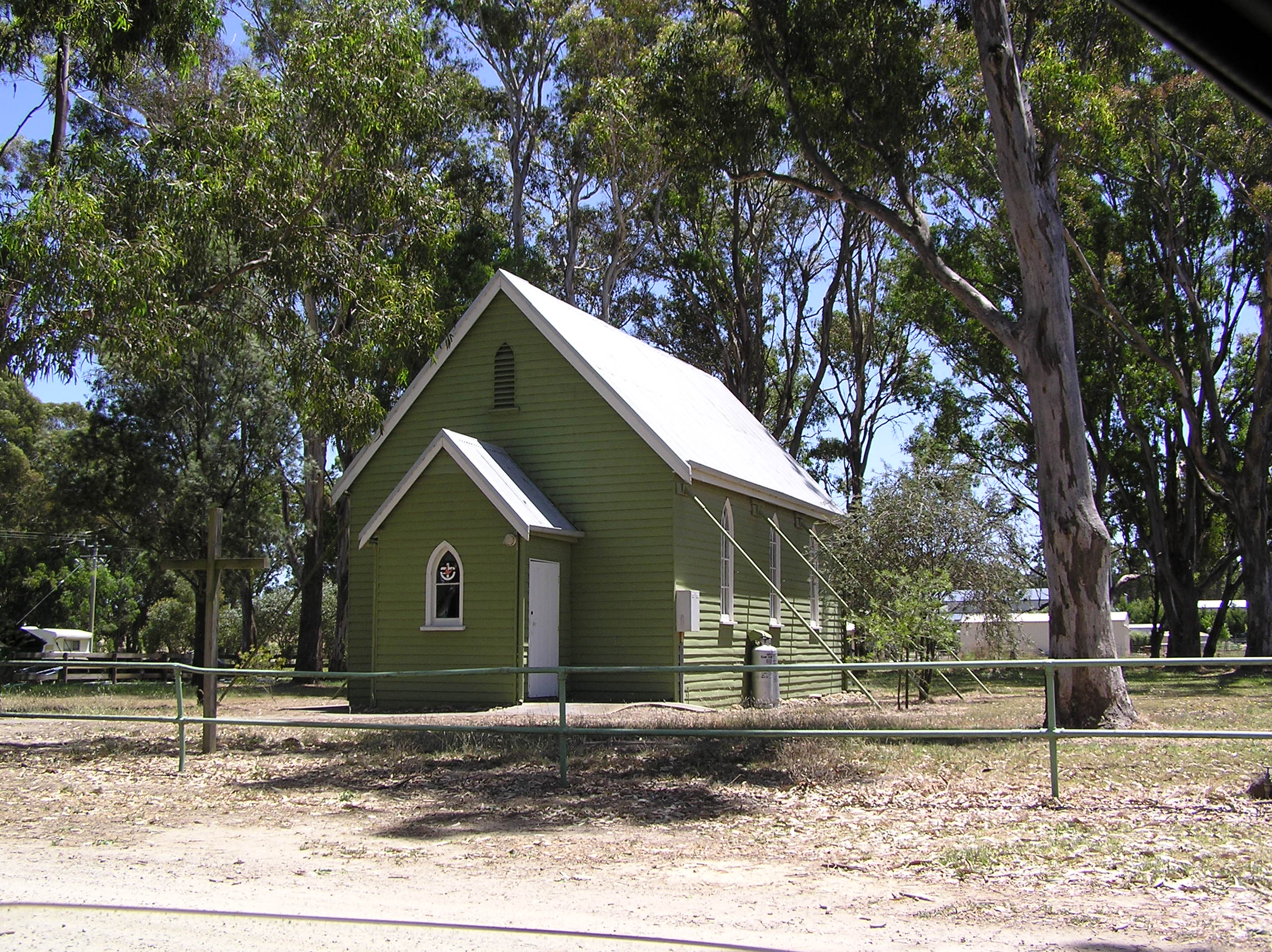
Church

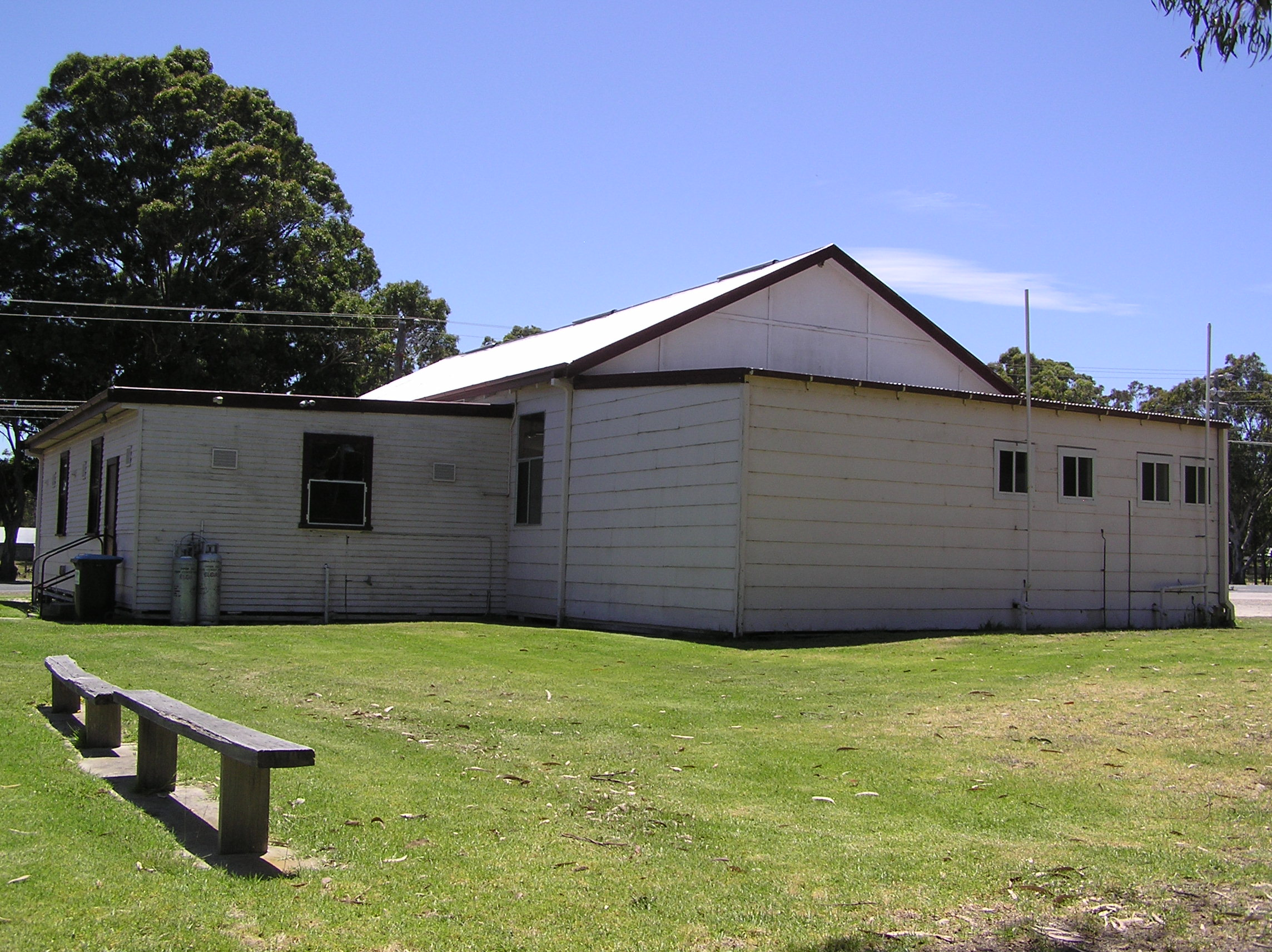
Town Hall

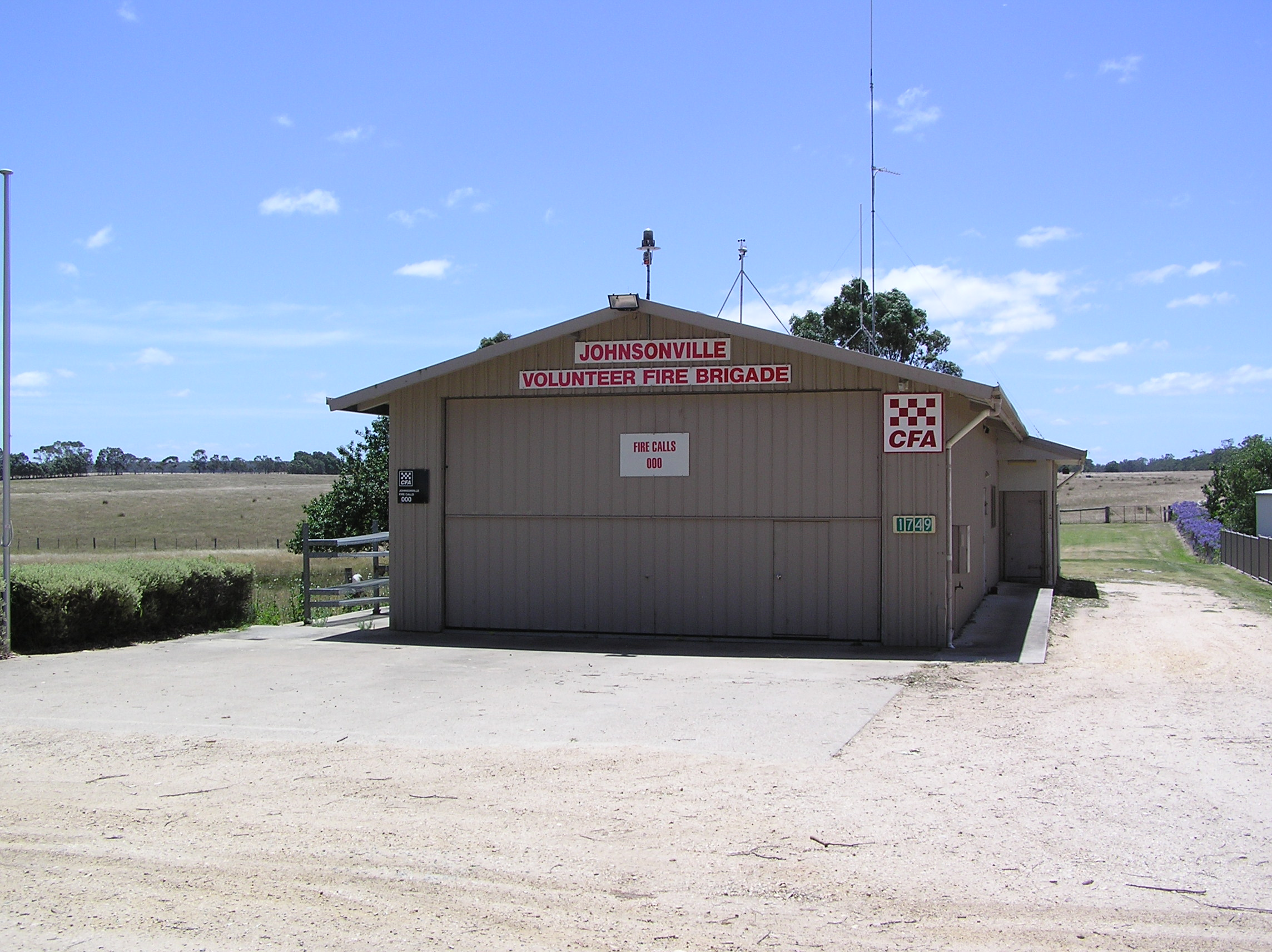
Volunteer Fire Brigade Station

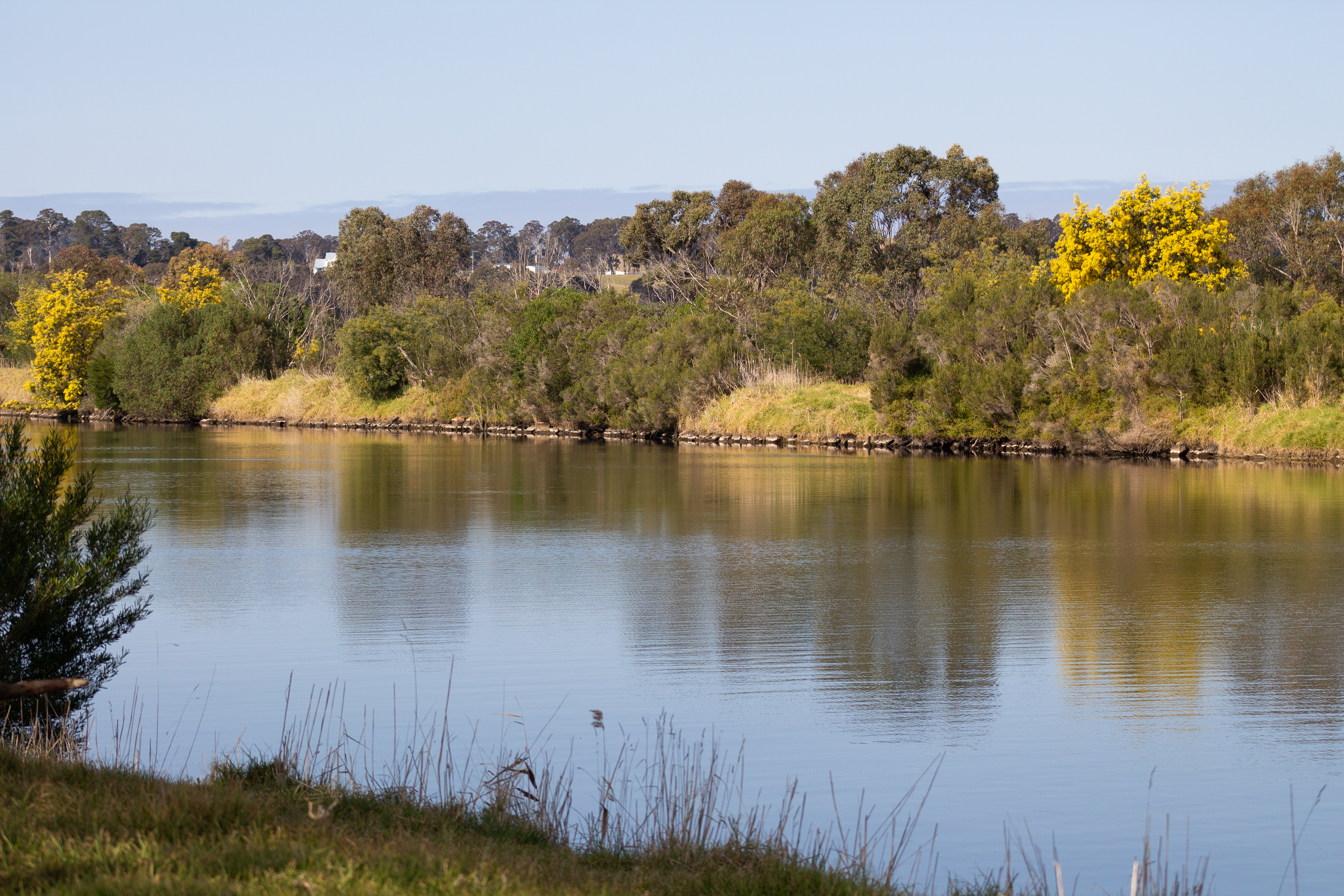
The Tambo River
