= Benambra =

- Town
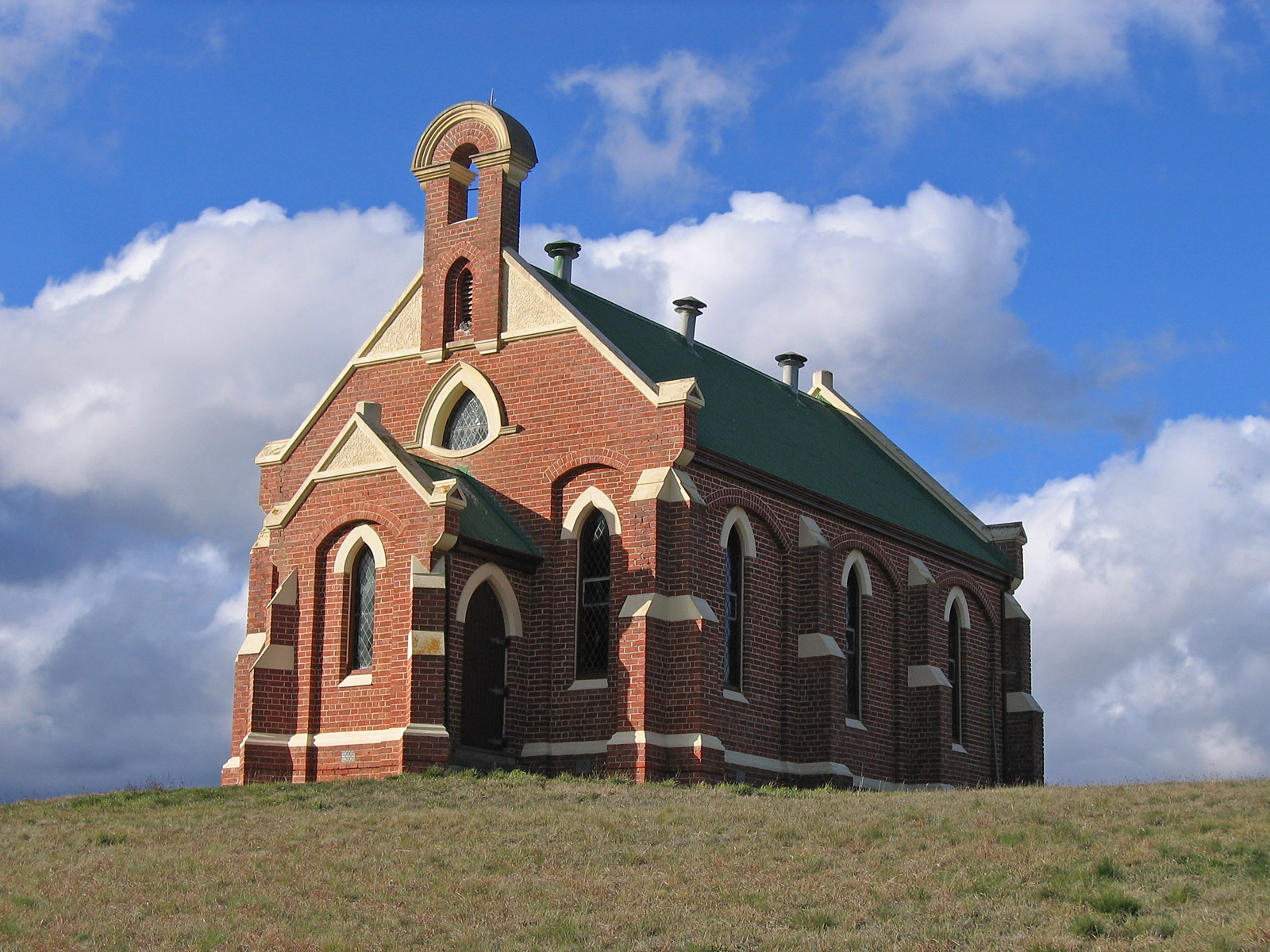
- The Benambra Uniting Church, erected 1905

- Interactive map of Benambra
- Coordinates: 36°57′0″S 147°43′0″E
- Country: Australia
- State: Victoria
- LGA: Shire of East Gippsland
- Location: 430 km (270 mi) NE of Melbourne; 149 km (93 mi) N of Bairnsdale; 28 km (17 mi) N of Omeo

Government
  - State electorate: Gippsland East
  - Federal division: Gippsland
- Elevation: 700 m (2,300 ft)

Population
  - Total: 149 (2016 census)
- Postcode: 3900

Benambra is a town 28 kilometres (17 mi) north-east of Omeo and 430 kilometres (267 mi) east of the state capital Melbourne, in the Australian Alps of East Gippsland, Victoria, Australia. Nearby towns include Swifts Creek, Ensay, and the major town of Bairnsdale. At the 2021 census, Benambra and the surrounding area had a population of 173.

== The Town ==
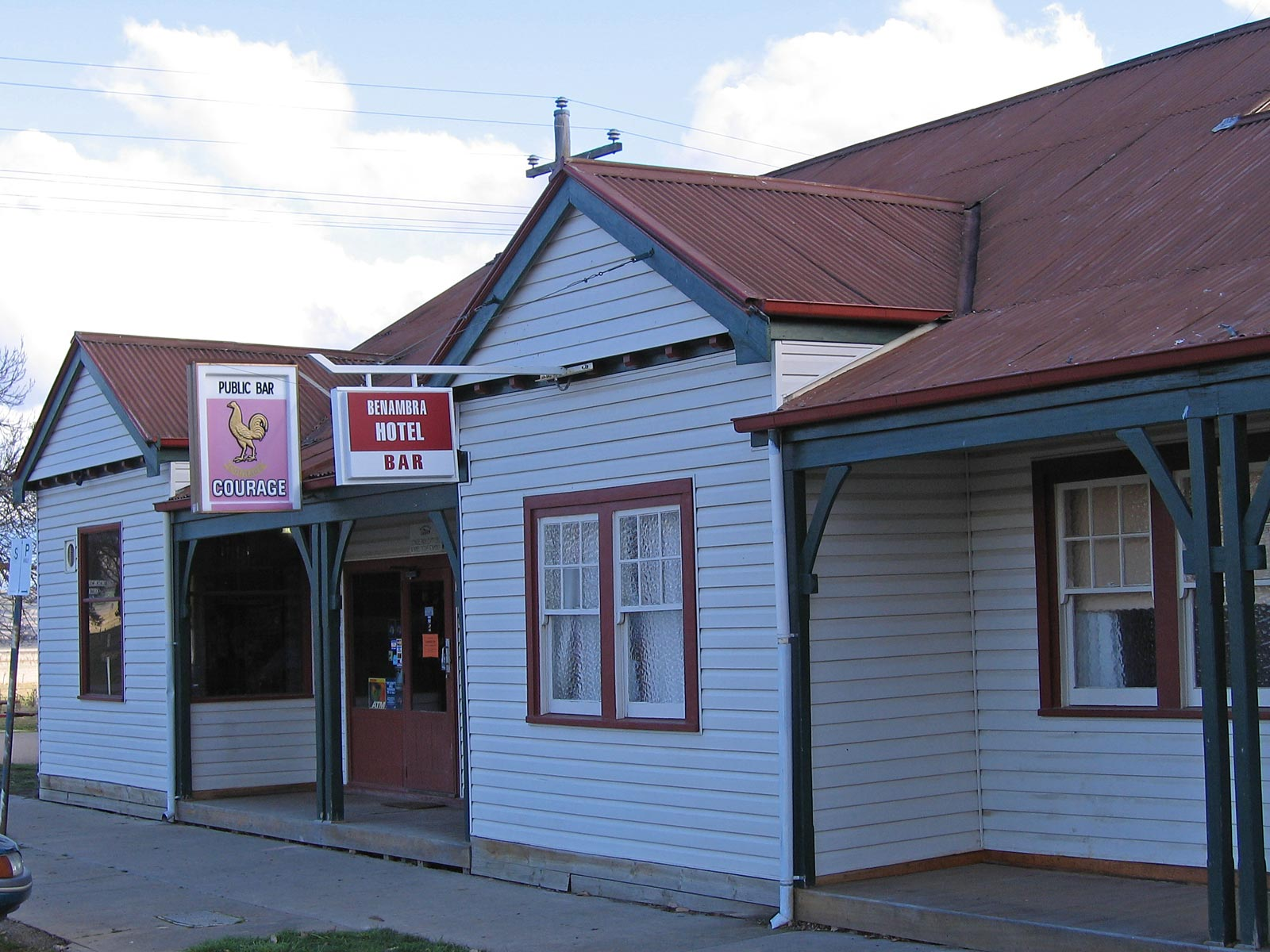
Frontage of the Benambra Hotel, including advertising sign for the long defunct Courage beer brand

Benambra town centre is at the intersection of Gibbo Street and Limestone Road, at an altitude of approximately 700m. The town has a population of around 170, although most residents live on farms and properties out of the actual town.

From its early days Benambra has been regarded as a premier agricultural area, specialising in both sheep and cattle farming. The annual weaner calf sales, held in March, attract buyers from across Australia who are seeking high quality predominantly Hereford and Hereford Shorthorn Cross calves on offer. Merino sheep are raised for wool, and there is a small amount of cropping in the area.

The timber industry employs a small number of people in harvesting, handling and transportation of the logs to mills in other areas. Mining was once also a significant employer in the area, but only occasional forays are currently conducted. Benambra mine operated between 1992 and 1996. In 2004 the mining licence expired, and the mine was taken over by the State of Victoria, which then rehabilitated it.

For the tourist, the area offers mountain scenery, clear trout fishing streams, and an assortment of bush walking trails, including those of the Alpine National Park.

The town of Benambra is on the shores of Lake Omeo which can also serve as a tourist attraction, however this lake only irregularly holds water at present. During wetter times a pier and public toilets were built at the top end of the lake furthest from the town where the lake is at its maximum depth. The depth varies when full from about 3m at the top end to about 1m at the town end, where the lake will flood across the sealed road. When holding sufficient water, the lake has hosted sailing, and, later, speed boat races; the last speed boat races were held on Australia Day in January, 1975.

== History ==
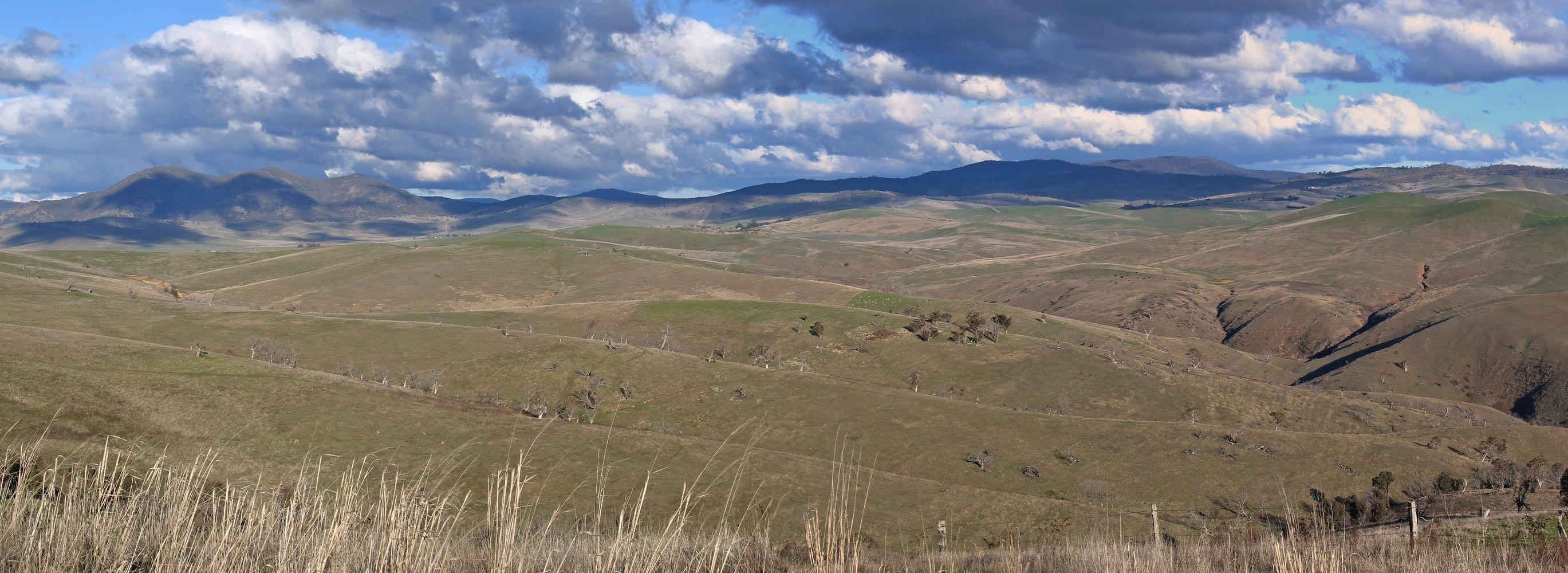
The Omeo Plains near Benambra from Mount Blowhard

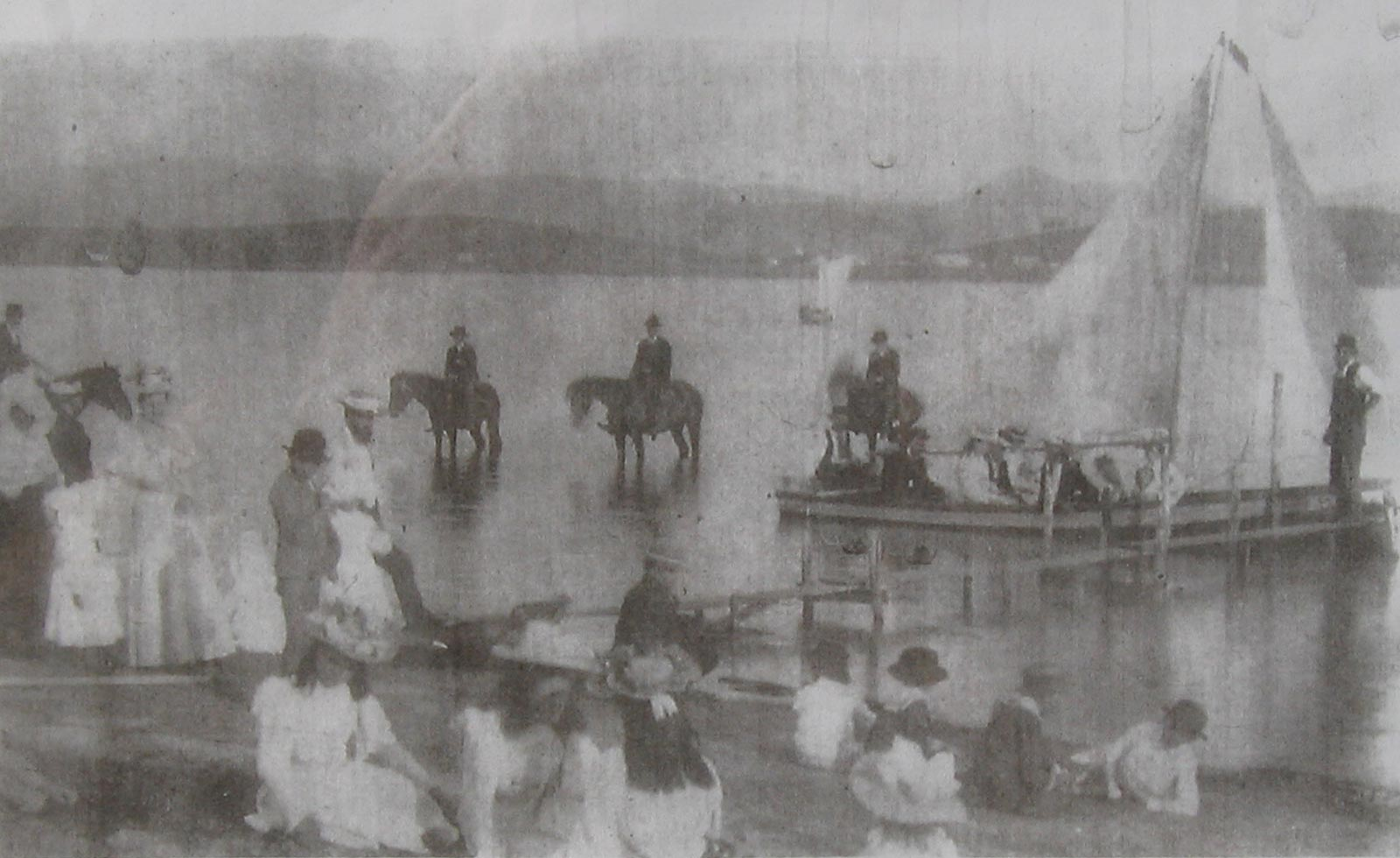
Boating on Lake Omeo, Benambra, 1892

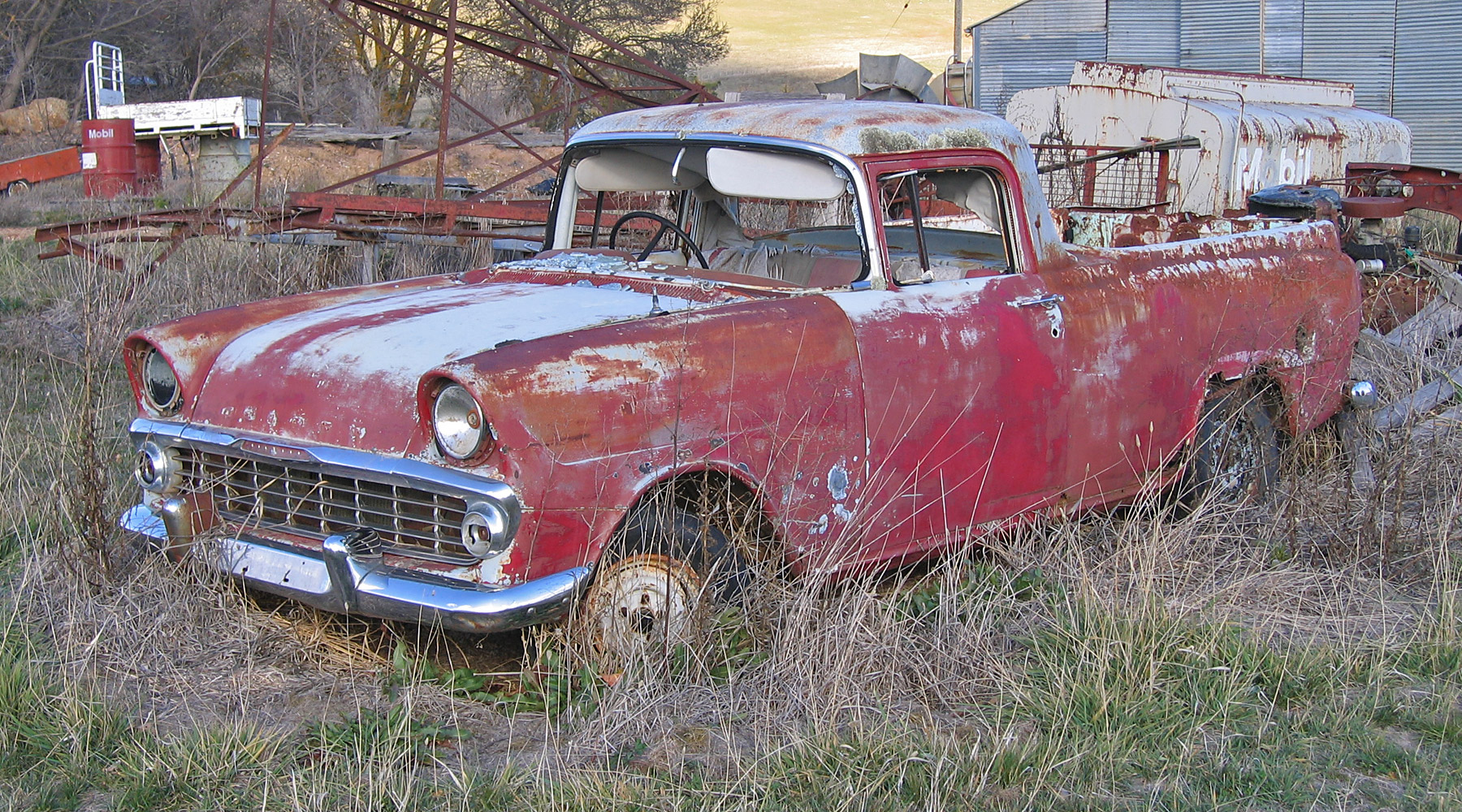
A rusting 1961 EK Holden at a former garage in Gibbo St. is an echo of more affluent times

Benambra was one of the first regions of Victoria to be settled by Europeans; this was during the period of 1834–1836, the same time that the first settlements were being made in Melbourne and also at Portland in the state's south-west.

The Aboriginal history from this area is not especially well recorded. There was a mountain clan, the Ja-itma-thang, centred on the Omeo area, but this clan would have interacted regularly with nearby tribes, including the Gunai or Kurnai of Gippsland proper. Population levels are uncertain, but were likely highly underestimated by European settlers, especially with consideration given to the fact that observation in the mountains and forests of Gippsland is far more difficult than in the more open parts of Australia. What is clear is that like elsewhere, population levels quickly declined following European occupation due to both disease and conflict, and people from this clan are no longer found in the area.

Unlike most of Australia, where exploration typically went inland from the sea, the Gippsland region was first explored and settled by Europeans who came overland from the Monaro region of New South Wales and headed down to the coastal regions. This could perhaps be seen as a natural expansion of the first settlements of Australia radiating out from Sydney, but to do so the settlers had to cross the not insignificant barrier of the Australian Alps.

In fact the first to arrive via this route were not explorers in the traditional sense, but ordinary stockmen pushing out to expand their range. The route they initially found put them in the Omeo region, with access largely through present day Benambra. First to arrive was James MacFarlane in late 1834, and in 1835 he returned with two other Highland Scots, George MacKillop and Livingstone, all settling on the Omeo Plains (which stretch from east of Benambra westwards to Omeo).

MacFarlane then returned to the Monaro and brought cattle back to the Benambra area in 1836 (which at the time they called Strathdownie). This formed Gippsland's first squatting run. The Scots were soon followed by four Irish cattlemen from the Monaro. John Pendergast was at Lake Omeo (in Benambra) by 1836, John Hyland took up a run at Hinnomunjie (a locality between Benambra and Omeo), Edmund Buckley moved to Tongio Munjie and Ensay, south of Omeo, in 1836, and his stepson, Patrick Buckley, was at Benambra by 1839. Many of these surnames are still common in the area.

By the time of 1839 and 1840 wealthy landholders in New South Wales had become interested in the Gippsland region and funded further exploration of the region. The key explorations around this time were those of another Scot, Angus McMillan, and a Polish scientist-explorer, Count Paul Strzelecki. Both of these expedition parties passed through the then established lands around Benambra and Omeo heading south towards the coast, and both were assisted by the McFarlane family.

McMillan completed several expeditions, and while he was not necessarily the first to visit many locations, his explorations were the most important in terms of European settlement of Gippsland proper. On his final expedition he located a suitable port for the region, at present day Port Albert. The route established then by McMillan remains essentially the same major north–south route through Gippsland to this day. This route follows the Great Alpine Road south through the Tambo Valley to Bruthen, then west to Bairnsdale and Sale along the Princes Highway, then south from Sale to Port Albert.

For several decades Gippsland operated essentially on this north–south axis, following this route from Benambra and Omeo to Port Albert, but in the 1860s a road was opened from Melbourne to the east, and this was followed a couple of decades later by a rail line and a Post Office opened on 16 June 1886. These developments, along with development of significant east–west shipping on the Gippsland Lakes at the time, reoriented travel and transport to the simpler east–west axis, and demoted the Benambra and Omeo regions to a side branch of this main route.

== Facilities (past and present) ==
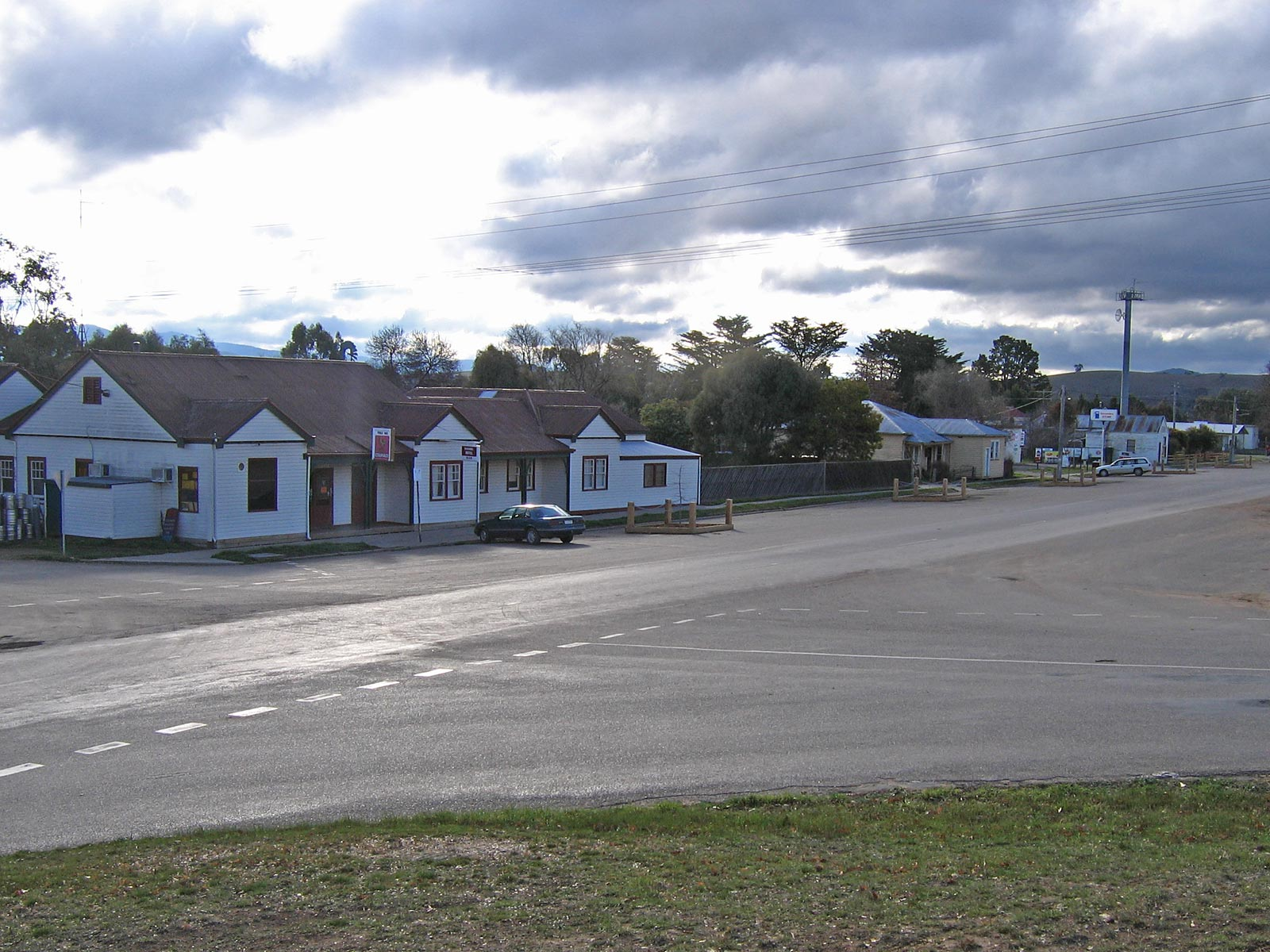
The main street of Benambra

In line with most small country towns the population of Benambra has been in gradual decline over recent years. The town itself has always been relatively small in terms of facilities, in line with its population and the relatively short distance and easy access to nearby Omeo.

Into relatively recent times Benambra supported a primary school, which operated between 1976—2014, a number of sporting teams and other facilities, including a traditional country pub, the charming Presbyterian (now Uniting) Church erected in 1905, a community hall, a ‘neighbourhood house’, a police station, and a number of small commercial outlets, such as a general store, bank and garage. Many of these facilities continue to this day in some form.

== Education ==
Benambra Primary School opened on 3 October 1876, initially under the name ‘Omeo Plains East’. The school came about as a result of an application put before the Victorian Board of Education by a group of pioneers in the district. In its first year the school had 19 students ranging from Grades 1 to 4. The teacher was provided with a house in Benambra's main street, Gibbo St. A number of other schools were opened in the area over time to serve what was in the past a larger and less mobile population involved in farming and mining.

Benambra Primary School was the last surviving of the schools on the Omeo Plains, with children transported to the school by a small bus from outlying areas such as The Brothers and Uplands until as recently as 1998. Benambra Primary School continued until 2002 when the enrolment was nine students, and closed at the end of that year when projected enrolments for the following year dropped to as low as one student. Benambra Primary School is officially still a going concern under the caretakership of the Benambra Neighbourhood House, however it seems unlikely at this stage that it will ever again open for students.

From 2003, local children have been bussed to Omeo Primary School, with secondary students making the daily 100 km round trip to Swifts Creek School.

Occasional short courses are run for the community at the Benambra Neighbourhood House, however older students wishing to undertake more formal tertiary study can do via the Swifts Creek Outreach Centre for TAFE or must travel considerable distances to nearby towns such as Bairnsdale, or relocate to larger towns or cities.

== Sports ==
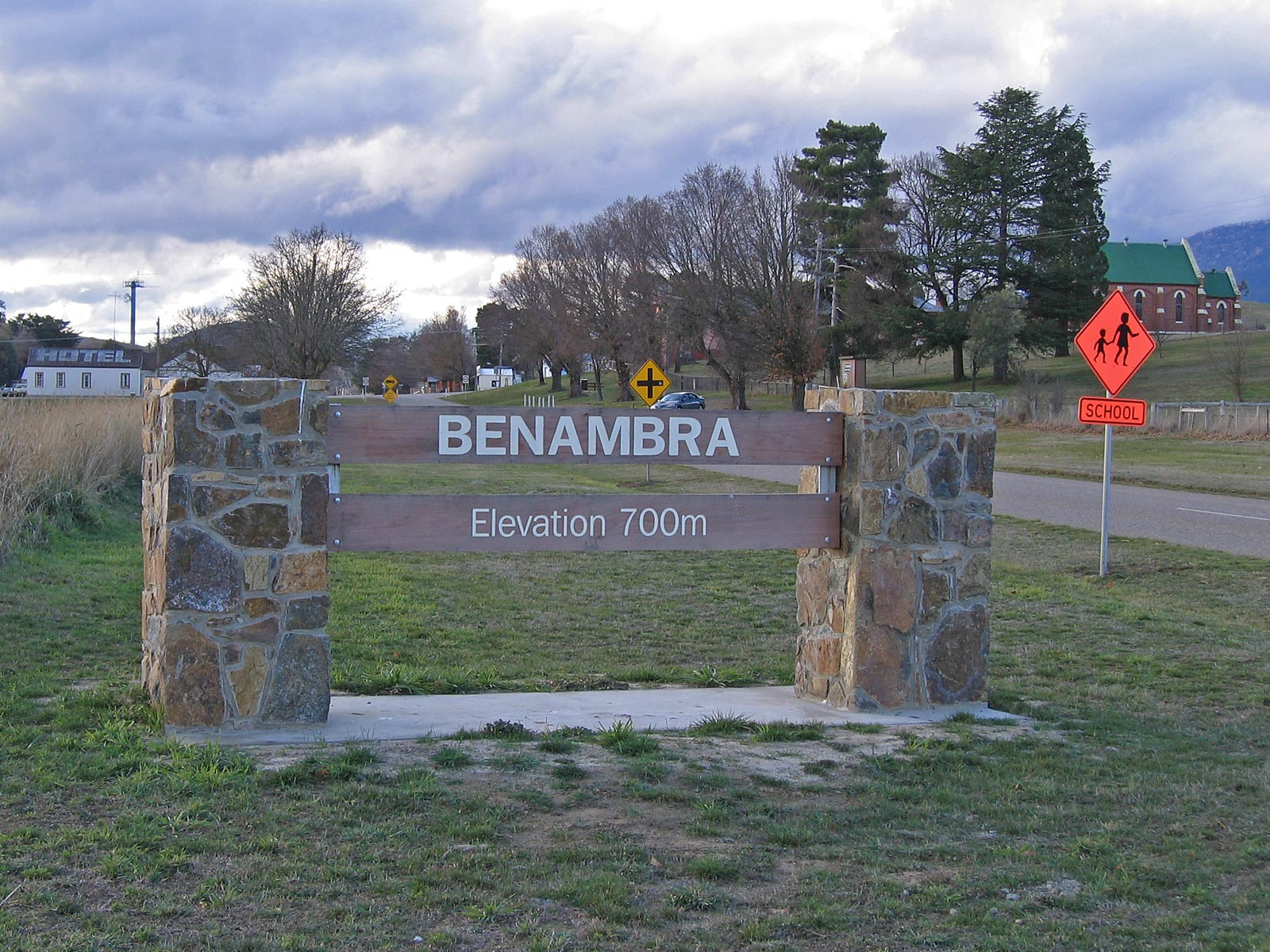
Town sign at southern (Omeo road) entrance to town

The town formerly had an Australian rules football team nicknamed ‘The Bloods’ competing in the Omeo & District Football League (ODFL), as well as an affiliated netball team competing in the associated netball competition. They fielded senior and junior football teams, and senior, junior and midget netball teams. The Benambra colours were red and white. Benambra football jumpers consisted of a red vee on a white background, essentially the design of what was once the South Melbourne VFL football club, and now the Sydney Swans AFL club. The netball club wore a white top with red skirt.

With its increasingly smaller population Benambra began struggling to fill its sporting teams, particularly with large teams such as football, but for a time was able to extend its playing lists with a good supply of imported players from other towns and districts. With further declines in populations in the district, in 2007 the football and netball clubs merged with neighbouring town Omeo to form the Omeo-Benambra (Alpine Ranges) Club. The new club colours are blue, teal and white, with the logo and jumpers showing teal snow-peaked mountains separated by a blue river under a blue sky.

Benambra Tennis Club competes in the Omeo District Tennis Association (ODTA). The tennis club spent many lean years, with good representation but limited success in this competition; however it has been particularly successful over recent years, with several premierships in the early 2000s.

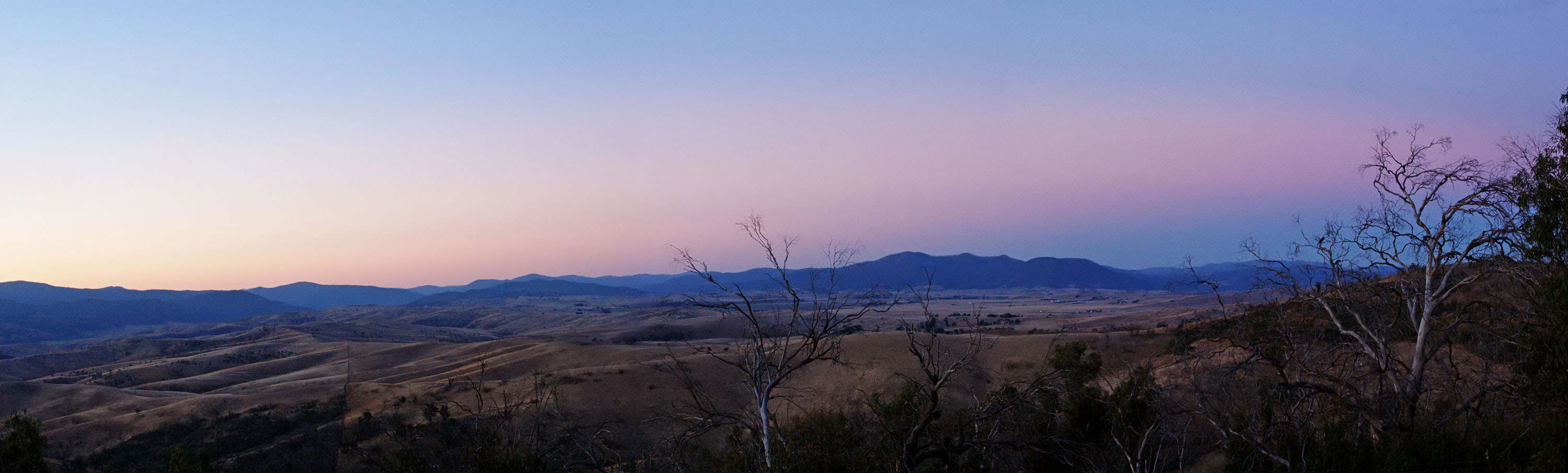
At dusk from McMillans Lookout, looking across the Omeo Plains to the dry lakebed of Lake Omeo, Benambra township, and The Brothers mountains in the distance.
