= Little River (Tambo River, East Gippsland, Victoria) =

River in Victoria, Australia

Little
- Location of the Little River mouth in Victoria
- Native name: Nalong (Dhudhuroa)

Location
- Country: Australia
- State: Victoria
- Region: South East Corner (IBRA), East Gippsland
- LGA: Shire of East Gippsland
- Town: Ensay

Physical characteristics
- Source: Mount Nugong
  - location: State forest
  - coordinates: 37°14′0″S 147°50′12″E
  - elevation: 497 m (1,631 ft)
- Mouth: confluence with the Tambo River
  - location: south of Ensay
  - coordinates: 37°22′49″S 147°49′59″E
  - elevation: 209 m (686 ft)
- Length: 21 km (13 mi)

Basin features
- River system: Mitchell River catchment
- Tributaries
  - left: Morass Creek

The Little River (or Nalong) is a perennial river of the Mitchell River catchment, in the East Gippsland region of the Australian state of Victoria.

== Course and features ==
The Little River rises below Mount Nugong, in a state forestry area, and flows generally south, joined by one minor tributary, before reaching its confluence with the Tambo River south of Ensay in the Shire of East Gippsland. The river descends 289 metres (948 ft) over its 21-kilometre (13 mi) course.

The Little River sub-catchment area is managed by the East Gippsland Catchment Management Authority.

The river is traversed by the Great Alpine Road near Ensay.

The Australian Aboriginal name for the river in the Dhudhuroa language is Nalong with no defined meaning.

== See also ==
- List of rivers in Australia
