= Ensay, Victoria =

Ensay
- Town
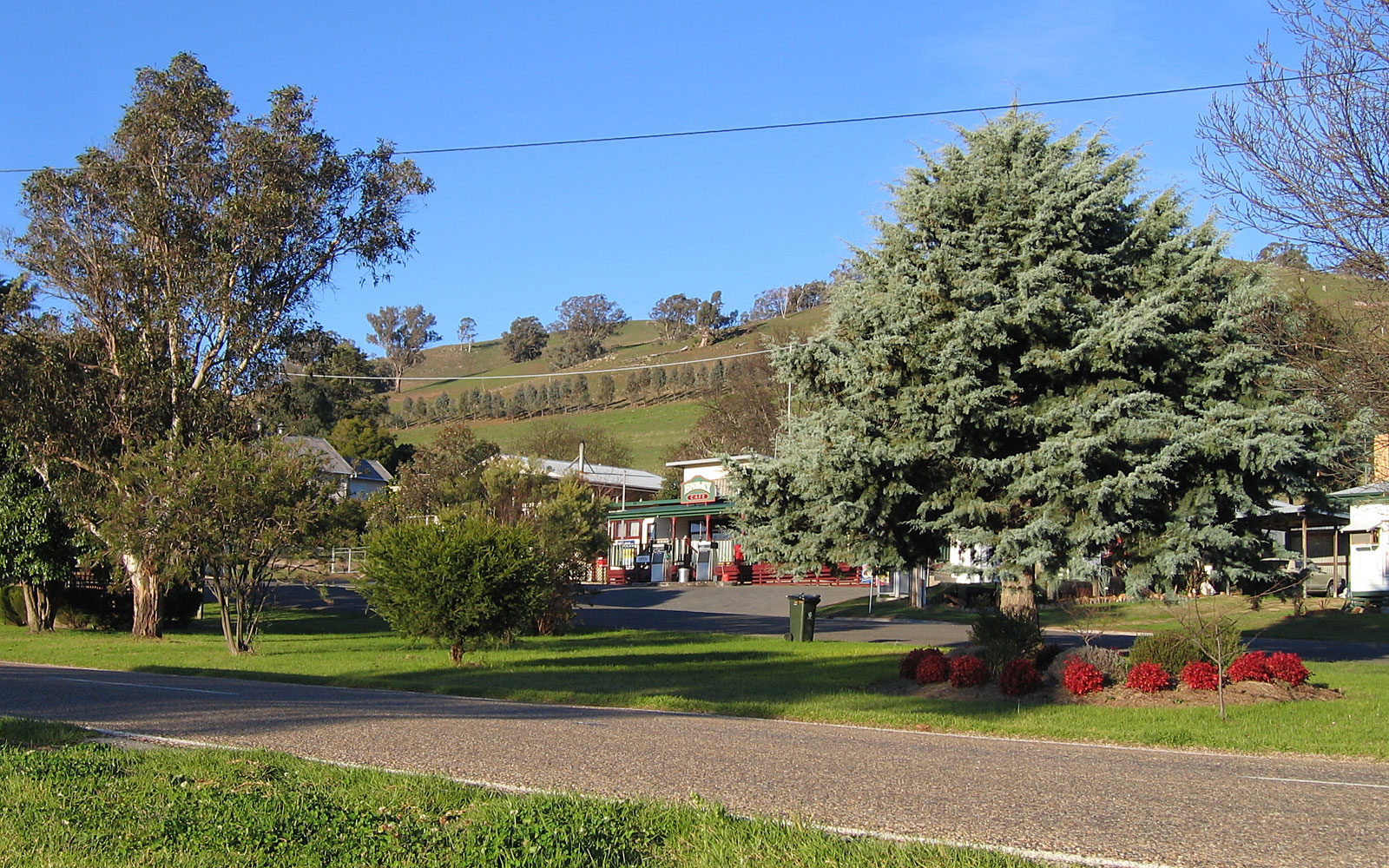
- The township of Ensay on the Great Alpine Road

- Interactive map of Ensay
- Coordinates: 37°23′0″S 147°50′0″E
- Country: Australia
- State: Victoria
- LGA: Shire of East Gippsland
- Location: 360 km (220 mi) E of Melbourne; 80 km (50 mi) N of Bairnsdale; 50 km (31 mi) SE of Omeo; 26 km (16 mi) SE of Swifts Creek

Government
  - State electorate: Gippsland East
  - Federal division: Gippsland
- Elevation: 400 m (1,300 ft)

Population
  - Total: 109 (2016 census)
- Postcode: 3895

Ensay is a town located between Swifts Creek and Bruthen on the Great Alpine Road in East Gippsland, Victoria, Australia. Ensay is 80 kilometres (50 mi) north of the major town of Bairnsdale and 366 kilometres (227 mi) east of the state capital Melbourne. Other nearby towns include Omeo and Benambra.

The town centre is located north of the confluence of the Little and Tambo river; with an altitude of approximately 400 metres (1,312 ft) AMSL. The population of Ensay was 109 as at the 2016 census.

== History ==
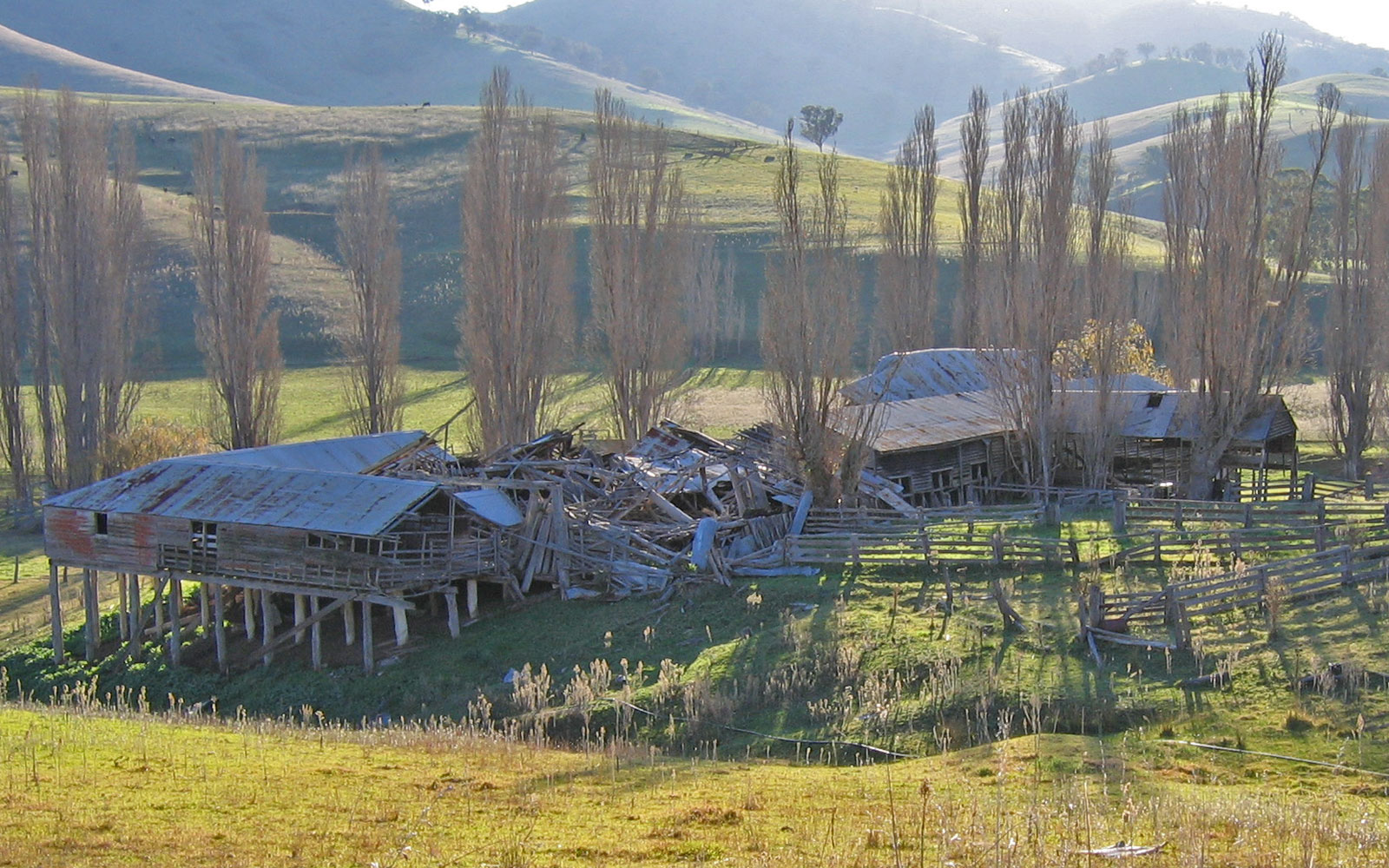
The remains of the Ensay shearing sheds, formerly part of Ensay Station, on the Little River Rd

The Aboriginal name for the area around Ensay was Numblamunjie, which translates as ‘blackfish place’. Archibald Macleod (see Bairnsdale, History) set up a station in this area in 1843. He named it after the now unpopulated island of Ensay in the Outer Hebrides of his homeland of Scotland, whose name originates from the Old Norse for Ewe Island.

The land around Ensay was originally taken up in 1839 by the noted explorer of the district Angus McMillan on behalf of his then employer Lachlan Macalister. This was abandoned shortly afterwards in 1841 with the settlement of large areas of land in the more central parts of Gippsland.

The original Ensay Station covered an enormous 38,400 acres (15,500 ha), which took in most of the Ensay district up to Swifts Creek, where it abutted the Tongio Station. Some areas very near Ensay, such as Reedy Flat, were outside the Ensay Station boundaries and were not occupied by European settlers until the 1870s. About 1881 T. Macknight Hamiton (d. 1907) and James Hamilton Irvine (d. 1895; whose brother was the 20th Laird of Drum) purchased Ensay Station.

Ensay Station was progressively split up into smaller farms over the years. Notably the area became a site for soldier settlers following World War I, as returned servicemen looking for employment were allocated areas of land to farm by the government. Agricultural use of the land around Ensay remains chiefly for the raising of cattle and sheep.

== Facilities (past and present) ==
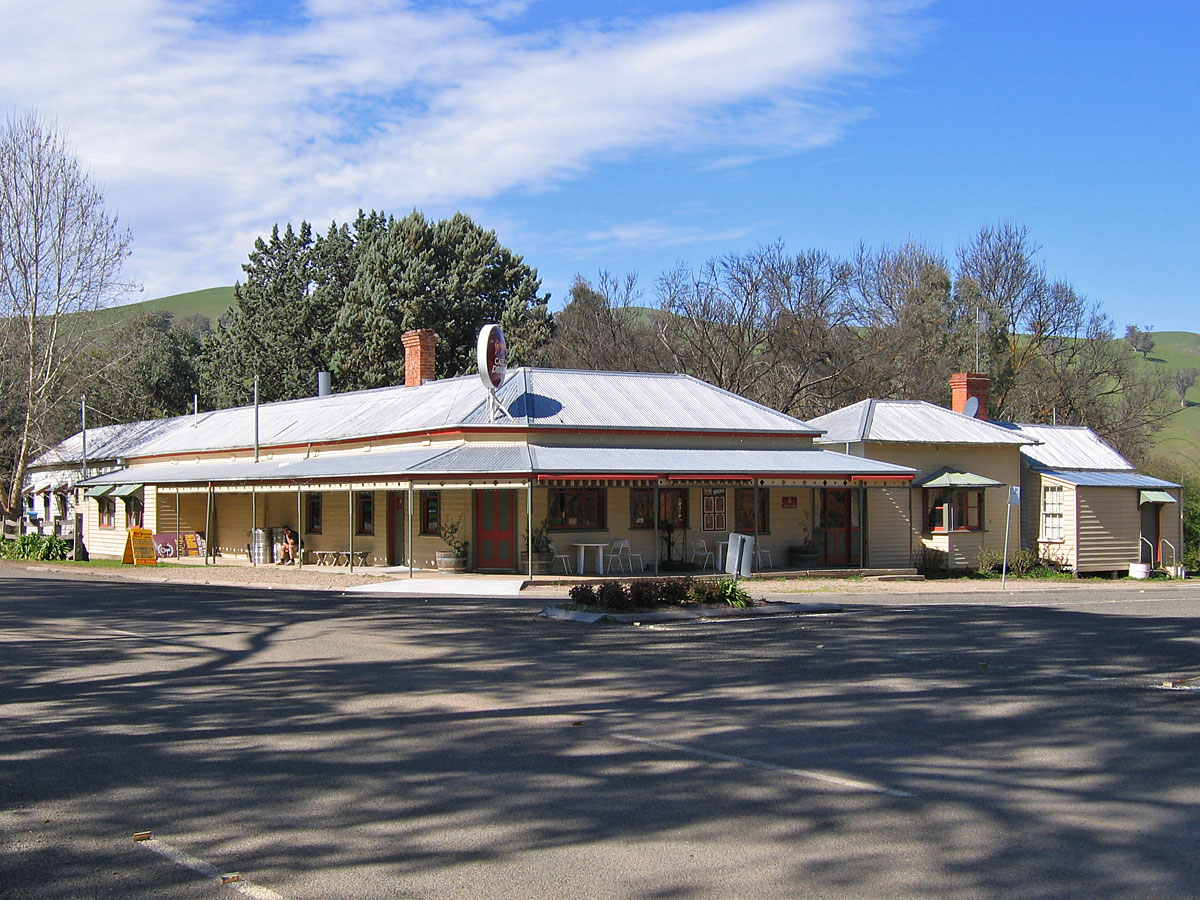
The classic architecture of The Little River Inn

The population of Ensay has contracted over the last few decades. In the past Ensay supported a primary school, a number of sporting teams and other facilities, including two significant pubs, two churches, a community hall, a Scout group and a cemetery. The Ensay Post Office opened on 1 March 1864. Several of these facilities continue to this day in some form.

The Ensay Primary School (originally simply the Ensay School) opened in 1889 and was rebuilt in 1912. In 1971 three other local primary schools closed (at Reedy Flat, Ensay North and Tambo Crossing) and amalgamated with Ensay Primary School to form the Ensay Group School. Ensay Primary School itself closed in 1994 when the number of students dropped to about six. Following this local children were bussed to Swifts Creek Primary School, with older students attending Swifts Creek Secondary College, now merged to form Swifts Creek P-12 School.

The Little River Inn originated as a shanty selling grog in the early 1840s. The first licence was taken out in 1847 and it has been continuously licensed since, remaining a popular local establishment to this day. This makes it the oldest hotel in the Omeo district and possibly the oldest in East Gippsland. The early Little River Inn seemed to be particularly susceptible to fire, having been burnt down at least three (and perhaps four) times in its history. The current building dates from the 1920s following the fire of 1921. At this time the building was rebuilt on its present site, a spot known at the time as Calcutta Corner. This hotel is around one kilometre from the official town centre, a short way down a side road east of the Great Alpine Road.

For many years the Ensay Post Office ran from a small attachment to the Little River Inn. After the post office moved to the general store, a small bookshop ran for several years from this attachment, later relocating to the former Primary School building, and then to Swifts Creek, before closing down in 2014. When the general store in Ensay closed about 2012, the post office relocated to again operate from the Little River Inn. The Ensay South Hotel, now sited on a small loop road off the Great Alpine Road about half a kilometre south of the town, was established in 1892 and closed in 1961.

A bush nursing facility was established at Ensay in 1912, with a new building established in 1958. In 1978 this became known as the Ensay Community Health Centre and now includes a Rural Ambulance Depot. Ensay also has a Country Fire Authority (CFA) depot, originally established in 1940 as the Ensay Bush Fire Brigade.

Ensay is the nearest town to the folk art sculpture Mr. Stringy, which is located about 12 km (7.5 mi) south alongside the Great Alpine Road.

== Sports ==
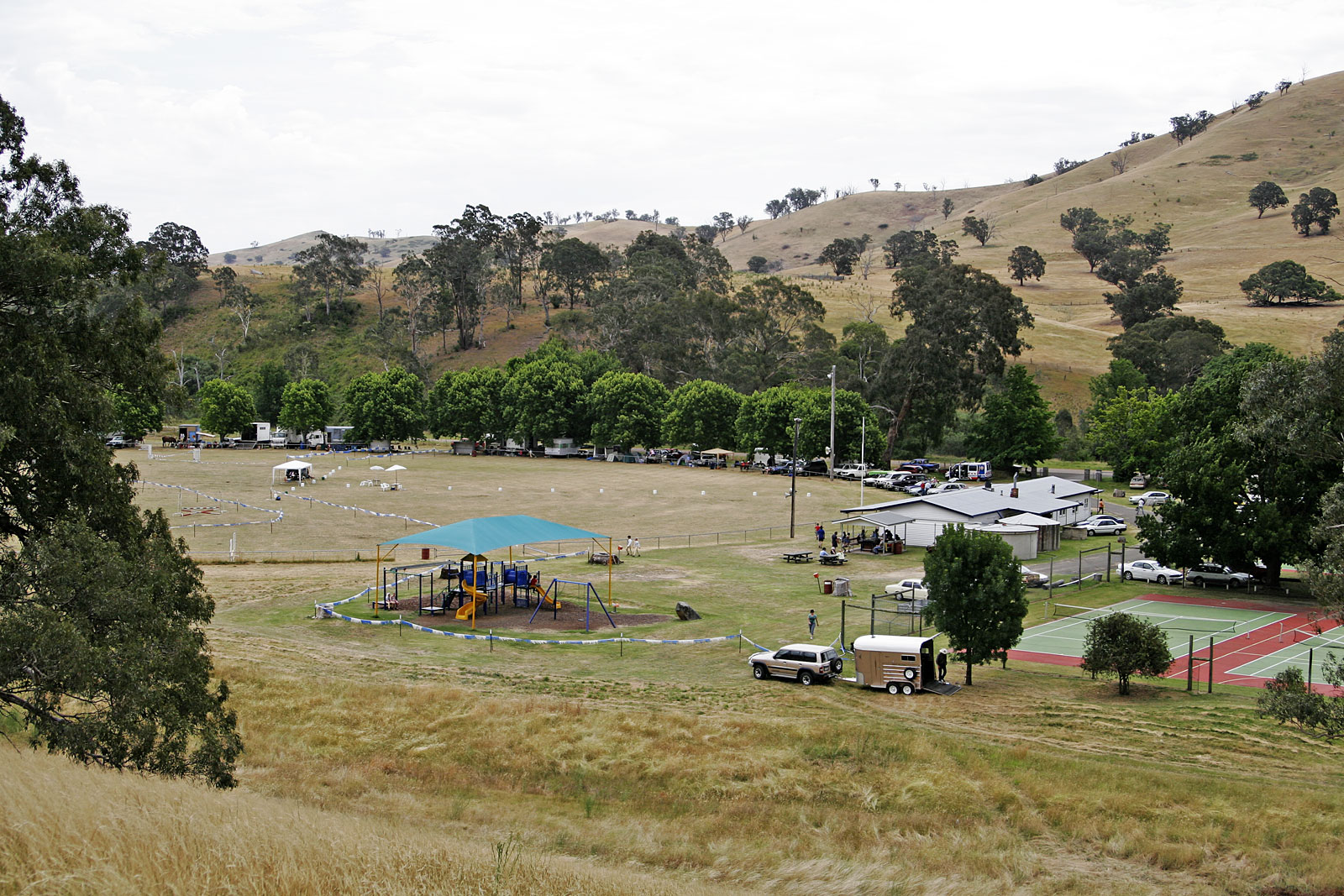
Ensay New Year's Day Sports Carnival, 2006

In Australian rules football the Ensay Football Club competed for many decades in the Omeo District Football League (ODFL). The football team won premierships in 1934, 1936, 1940, 1946, 1947, 1950 and 1960. The affiliated Ensay Netball Club competed in the associated netball competition.

The Ensay colours were blue and gold. Earlier Ensay football jumpers were a golden-yellow vee on a royal blue background. Late in their time Ensay changed their jumper to the early design of the West Coast Eagles AFL club. The netball club wore a yellow top with blue skirt.

The clubs played their last matches in 1995 when they struggled to field teams at the start of the season, finally folding after a few rounds. The recreation reserve is still kept in good condition and hosts occasional special games, including the ODFL final series and Grand Final annually.

Ensay Tennis Club competes in the Omeo District Tennis Association (ODTA). The tennis club maintained a strong presence for several years after the football and netball teams folded, but itself briefly ceased playing for the 2001/2002 and 2002/2003 seasons. Ensay revived for the 2003/2004 season and again takes part in the ODTA competition. Ensay also hosts the annual ANA Tournament on the Australia Day Weekend each year in late January, a long running and successful tennis tournament attracting entries from widely scattered areas.

A New Year's Day Sports' Carnival is also held annually in Ensay, chiefly consisting of a number of equestrian and novelty events. This annual carnival has been a local fixture of the surrounding community since 1916. Various other equestrian events are also held at the Ensay Recreation Reserve, and the reserve also features a lawn bowling green. The New Year's Day Sports Carnival is no longer held.

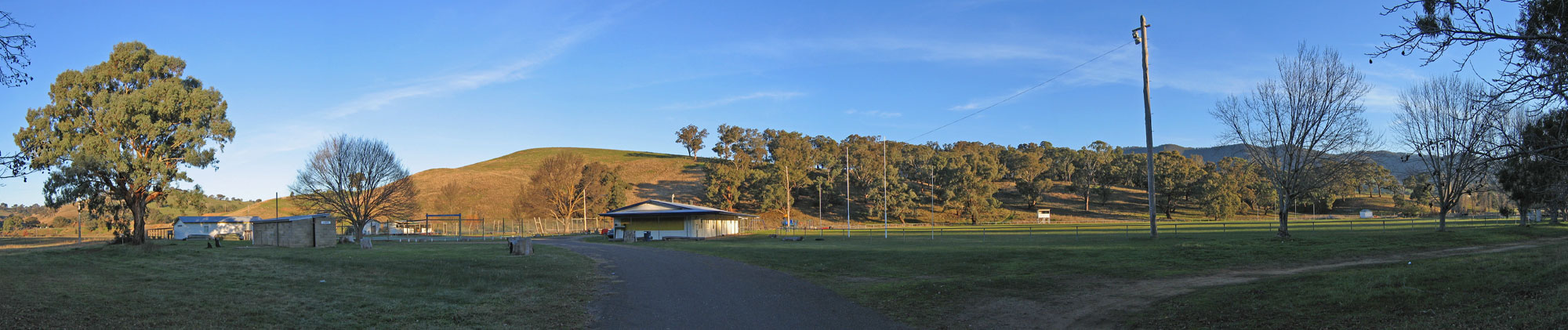
Panoramic 180° view of the Ensay Recreation Reserve. From left: public toilets, lawn bowls club and green, tennis and netball courts and clubrooms, football changerooms and clubrooms, playground, football oval

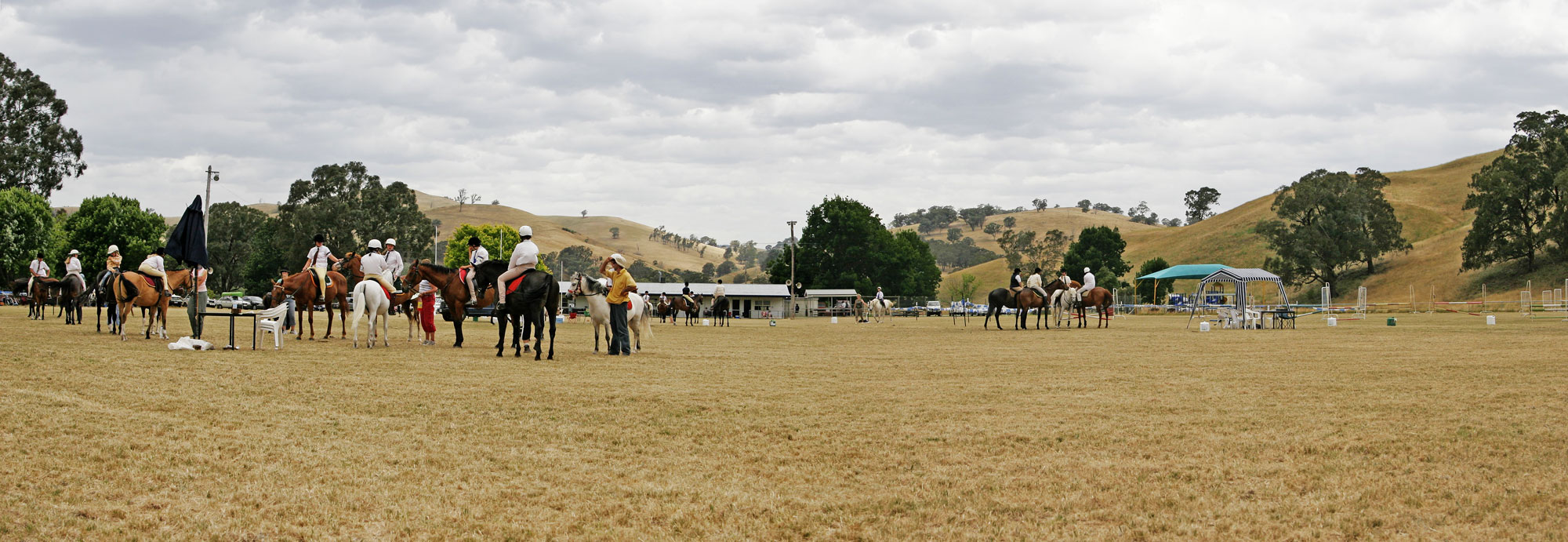
Panorama of the 2006 Ensay New Year's Day Sports Carnival

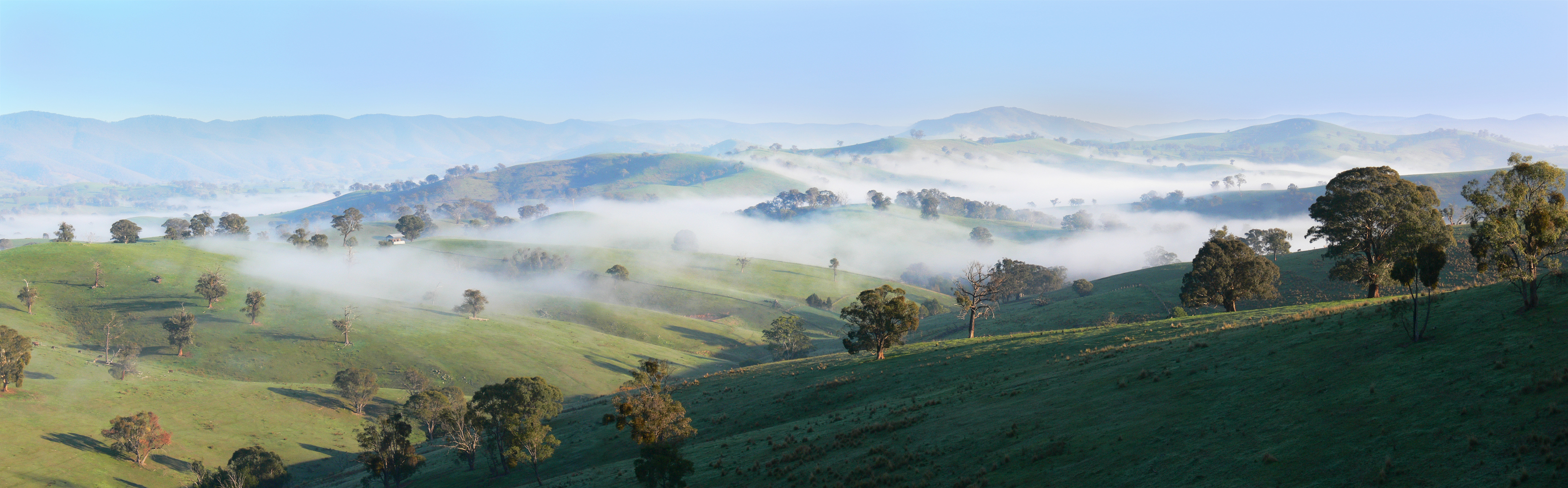
Early morning mist, taken from south-east of township, facing towards it
