= Tambo River (Victoria) =

Tambo
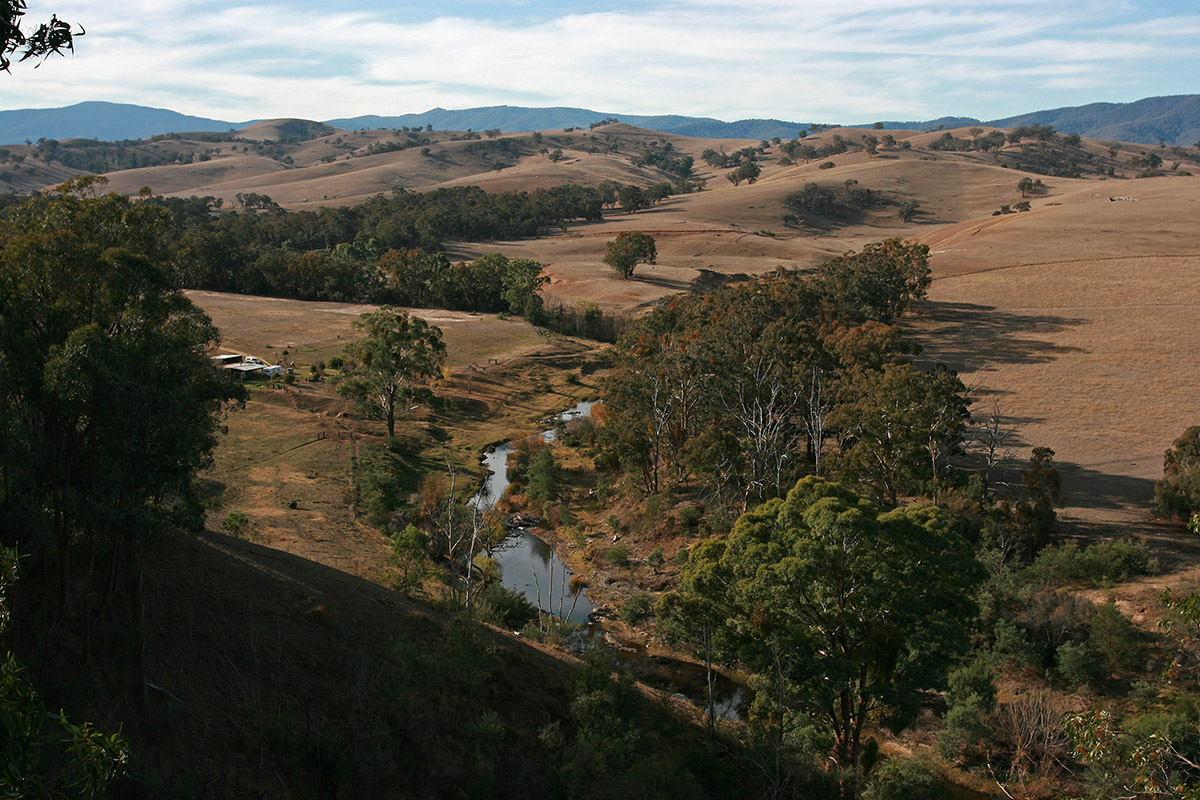
- The Tambo River and Tambo Valley, south of Ensay

- Location of the Tambo River mouth in Victoria
- Etymology: Aboriginal Ngarigo: meaning "fish"
- Native name: Berrawan (Ngarigu)

Location
- Country: Australia
- State: Victoria
- Region: South East Corner (IBRA), Victorian Alps, East Gippsland
- Local government area: Shire of East Gippsland
- Towns: Swifts Creek, Ensay, Tambo Crossing, Bruthen, Swan Reach, Johnsonville

Physical characteristics
- Source: Mount Leinster, Bowen Mountains, Great Dividing Range
  - location: Victorian Alps
  - coordinates: 36°57′S 147°54′E
  - elevation: 1,060 m (3,480 ft)
- Mouth: Lake King to form confluence with the Mitchell River
  - location: near Metung
  - coordinates: 37°51′26″S 147°48′40″E
  - elevation: 0 m (0 ft)
- Length: 186 km (116 mi)

Basin features
- River system: Mitchell River catchment
- Tributaries
  - left: Tambo River South Branch, Bindi Creek, Junction Creek, Sandy Creek (Victoria), Little River, Collins Creek, New South Wales, Timbarra River, Dead Horse Creek
  - right: McLean Creek, Duggan Creek, Bald Hill Creek (Victoria), Swifts Creek (Victoria), Running Creek, Haunted Stream, Shady Creek, Monkey Creek

The Tambo River or Berrawan is a perennial river of the Mitchell River catchment, in the East Gippsland region of the Australian state of Victoria. With a total length in excess of 186 kilometres (116 mi), the Tambo River is one of the longest rivers in the East Gippsland drainage basin, extending from the steep forested southern slopes of the Victorian Alps through forest and farmland to the Gippsland Lakes.

== Physical aspects ==
=== Course ===
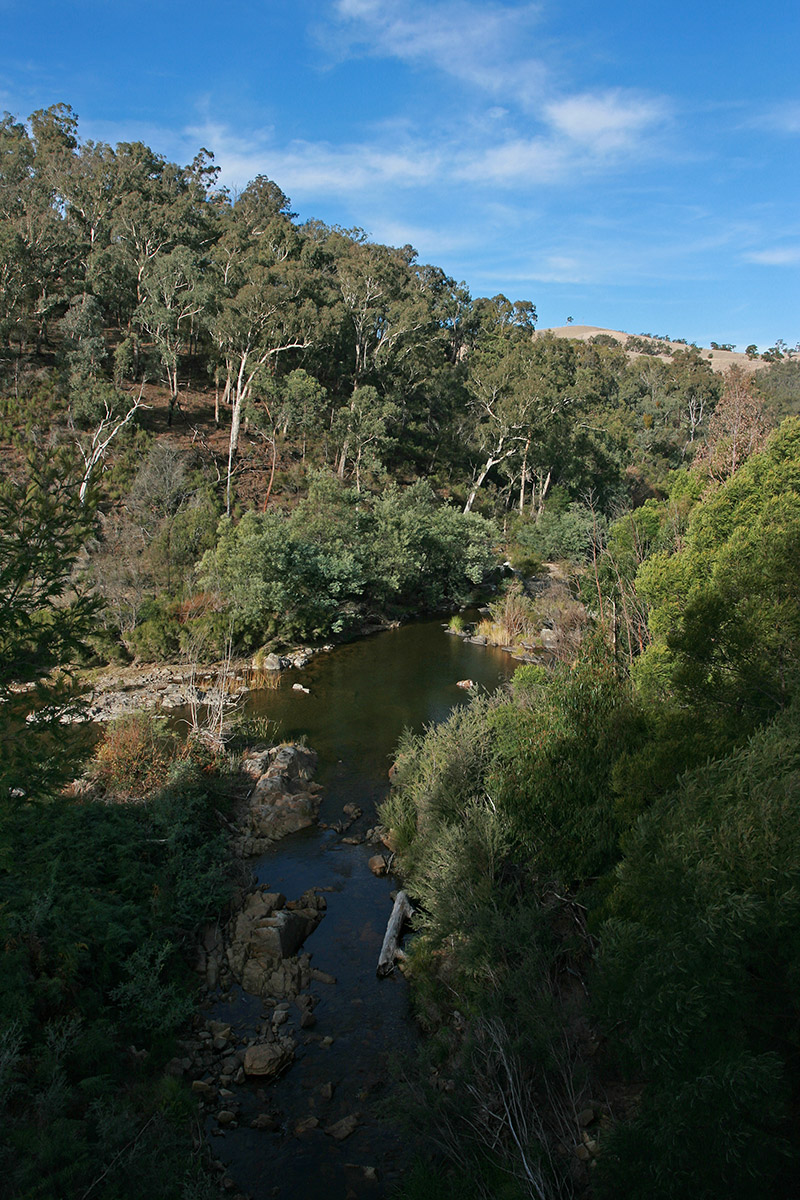
The confluence of the Tambo River and the Haunted Stream near Tambo Crossing

The Tambo River rises in the Bowen Mountains, below Mount Leinster in the Victorian Alps, part of the Great Dividing Range, about 20 kilometres (12 mi) east of Benambra. The river flows generally south by south southeast by south southwest, joined by sixteen tributaries including the Little and Timbarra rivers, before reaching its mouth and emptying into Lake King, one of the main lakes in the extensive Gippsland Lakes system. Within the lake, the Tambo River forms confluence with the Mitchell River, west of the village of Metung, with the Mitchell River draining into Bass Strait southwest of Lakes Entrance, in the Shire of East Gippsland. The river descends 1,060 metres (3,480 ft) over its 186-kilometre (116 mi) course.

Along its route it passes by the towns or localities of Bindi, Tongio, Swifts Creek, Ensay, Tambo Crossing, Bruthen, Tambo Upper, Swan Reach, and Johnsonville.

The river leaves the mountains and the Mount Tambo Scenic Reserve forming its headwaters near the locality of Bindi, north of Swifts Creek, and from Bindi flows through the Tambo Valley to Bruthen. The Great Alpine Road picks up the route of the river at Tongio and follows the river for much of the distance through the Tambo Valley south of this point. The valley from Bindi to just south of Ensay is relatively open and flat and is settled as farmland, however it again closes in to become steep forested mountain beyond Ensay. From just north of Bruthen the valley opens out into fertile river flats for the remainder of the river's journey to Lake King. At Swan Reach, the river is traversed by the Princes Highway. The river flats support cropping, dairy and beef cattle grazing.

=== Channel ===
Around Bindi the river channel is about 5 metres (16 ft) in width. By the Swifts Creek and Ensay region the river is up to 12 metres (39 ft) wide, with deep pools of up to 140 centimetres (55 in), and a substrate of rubble and gravel. In the steep forest sections between Ensay and Bruthen the channel width is up to 20 metres (66 ft), with a varying substrate of bedrock, boulders, rubble, sand and mud. Between Bruthen and Tambo Upper there is extensive sedimentation with channel width exceeding 25 metres (82 ft), but a summer depth typically less than 50 centimetres (20 in). Substrate in this section is all sand. The river narrows around Tambo Upper and the substrate becomes mainly mud beyond this point.

=== Tributaries ===
The Tambo River has a number of significant tributaries, with the two largest being the Little River which enters the Tambo from the north at Ensay, and the Timbarra River which enters the Tambo from the east, south-east of Tambo Crossing. The Tambo River South Branch, which originates on the Nunniong Plains in the hills east of Bindi, flows north to join the main river near its origin. The Tambo also has a number of more seasonal creeks entering along its length, including Swifts Creek which enters from the west at the town of the same name, Haunted Stream which enters from the west to the north of Tambo Crossing, with other minor tributaries including Junction Creek and Deep Creek.

== Ecology ==
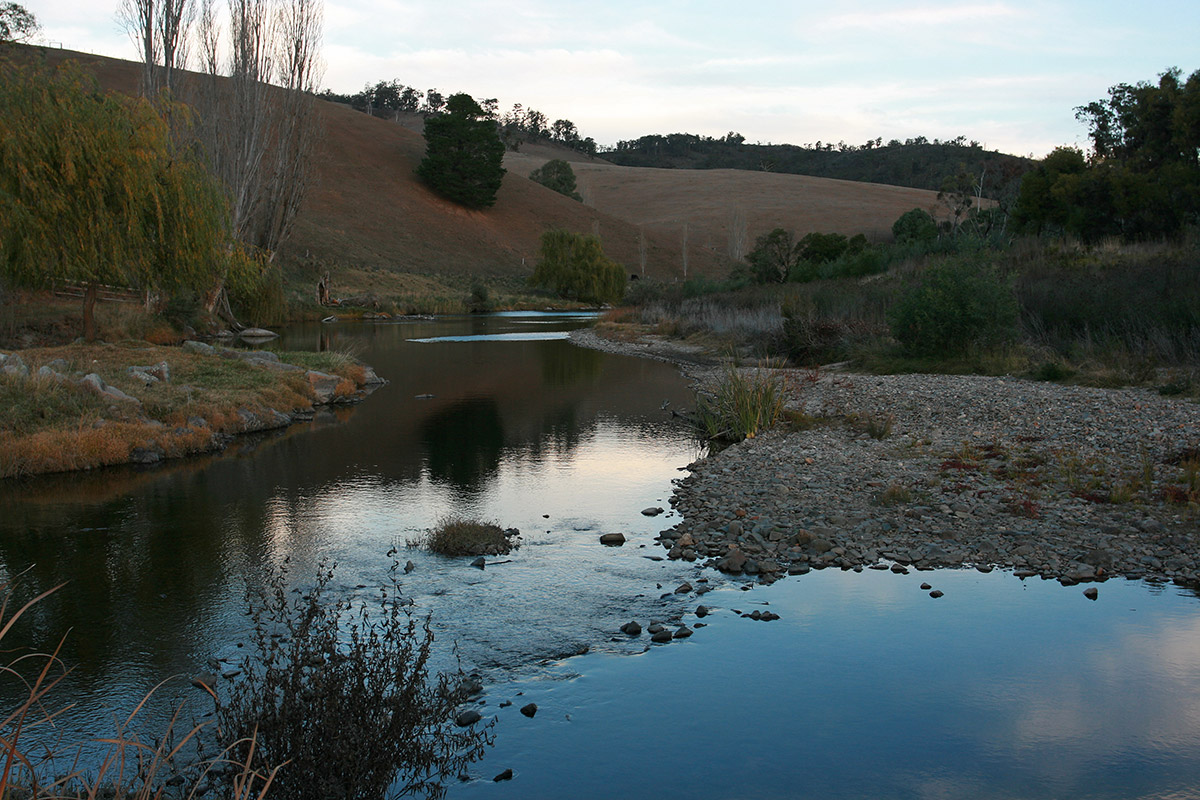
The Tambo River river crossing near Tambo Crossing

The central Tambo River area around Ensay and Swifts Creek have a mean annual rainfall of 500–700 millimetres (20–28 in), with the lower section of the basin around Bruthen getting 700–1,000 millimetres (28–39 in). Upper reaches of the significant tributary the Timbarra River typically get higher rainfalls. The Tambo and Timbarra have relatively reliable flows. There are some significant wetlands in the basin of the Tambo/Nicholson River systems.

=== Flora ===
The upper areas of the rivers include tall eucalyptus ash forests and alpine/subalpine vegetation, with the middle and lower reaches having a more low growing mixed species forest. The riparian vegetation in the Swifts Creek/Ensay region is largely grass and willows, with little erosion of the banks or sedimentation present. The riparian vegetation in the steep forest sections between Ensay and Bruthen is more natural, with wattles, eucalypts and other native species, while introduced species only become more prevalent again nearer to Bruthen.

=== Fauna ===
The nationally vulnerable Australian greyling has significant populations in the Tambo River. It is also a noted fishery for black bream. Low river flows that have been typical for a number of years have impacted on these species. The estuary perch is also common in the Tambo. Other fish that may be found in the river include native species such as the Australian bass, short-finned eel, long-finned eel, gudgeons, and the river blackfish, and introduced species such as brown trout and carp.

=== River health ===
The health of river has been impacted to various extents in its different sections by sediment run-off, and introduced weeds such as willows, blackberry and blue periwinkle. Algal blooms related to sediment run-off have been seen in the lower Tambo system and the Gippsland Lakes. Recreational boating and fishing have resulted in river bank erosion in the lower reaches.

The Lower Tambo Landcare Group was formed in 1998 and covers an area of 10,965 hectares (27,100 acres) on the lower parts of the river. The group aims to help re-establish Australian native vegetation on the river banks, wetlands and roadsides, to encourage landowners to fence off sensitive areas to help preserve them for native species, and to control and manage pest species.

== History ==
=== Aboriginal history ===
Due to its length, the Tambo stretched across the lands of at least two Aboriginal nations. The Jaitmathang people from the Upper Murray areas occupied the upper reaches of the river, while the Brabiralung of the Gunai/Kurnai nation occupied the lower southern reaches. According to Alfred Howitt the border between these two nations was around Tongio, about 10 kilometres (6.2 mi) north of present-day Swifts Creek.

==== Etymology ====
The name tambo is of uncertain origin, but is thought to be an Aboriginal Ngarigo word meaning "fish". Reverend Friedrich Hagenauer recorded the Gunai name for the river to be Berrawan. Alternative traditional names for the river include Bindi-memial or Jillun, meaning "the stomach" in the Brabralung language; Tonggio-pannerer or Tongio-memial, with no defined meanings in the Dhudhuroa language; Gwannung-bourn, meaning "pelican" in the Tatungalung language; Ber'rawan, with no defined meaning or language group; and Kookoondalook, meaning "wasps in the trees" in the Krauatungalung language.

=== European history ===
The first Europeans to follow the course of the river are thought to be a party led by Walter Mitchell in early 1839, who were guided by Aborigines along a route from the north through the Tongio Gap south of Omeo, down the valley to Bruthen and the Gippsland Lakes, and then back along the same route. An agricultural station was set up around the same time at Tongio by the Buckleys. Late in 1839 Angus McMillan established a station further south near present-day Ensay, and also used Aboriginal guides on his explorations further south along the valley and into other parts of Gippsland soon thereafter. The early explorers of Australia noted that the routes along the river and valley were well used Aboriginal trails, although in places such as the section between Tambo Crossing and Bruthen, where the river is less accessible, the trails diverted through the mountains in a similar way to the current main road through this area.

== Recreational uses ==
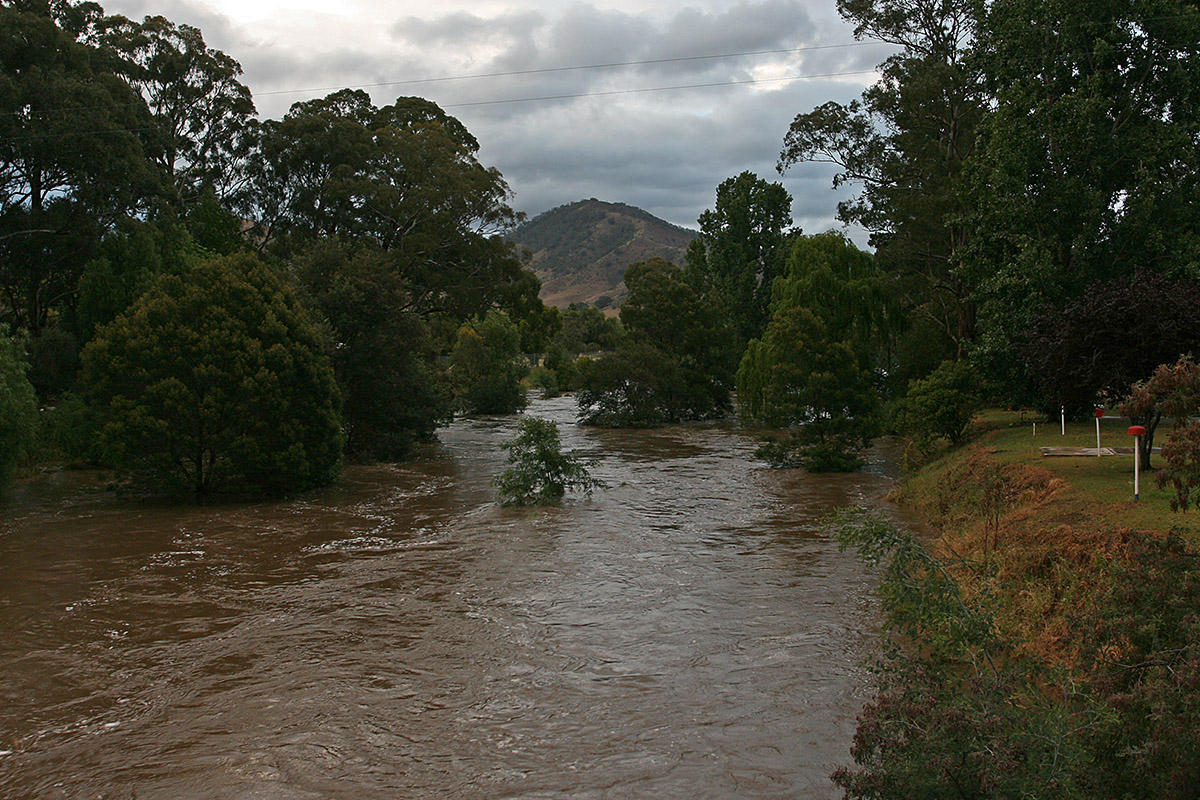
The Tambo River in flood at Swifts Creek, looking north

The lower reaches of the Tambo River around the estuary are popular for recreational boating, however the higher reaches are of limited use for this activity due to the terrain and the restricted river depth and width.

Sections of the river, particularly around the estuary, are used for recreational fishing, however it considered to be of limited angling value for most of its length because of the scarcity of angling species. While some of the river's tributaries carry self-supporting populations of brown trout, the Tambo itself carries few trout south of Bindi, even despite extensive stocking up to 1974. With no physical barriers to the fish spreading, it is thought natural chemical discharges from some springs contaminating the river may affect some fish populations such as the trout. Another reason could be high water temperatures during summer, as small numbers of trout in the main river section have been found in cooler months.

== River management ==
The Tambo River catchment area is managed by the East Gippsland Catchment Management Authority. The East Gippsland Region Water Authority manages urban water diversion from the river, while the Gippsland & Southern Rural Water Authority manages rural diversion and irrigation. Fisheries Victoria, a section of the Department of Primary Industries, manages the fish stocking and fisheries policy.

Water is diverted from the river to be used as the main water supply for the town of Swifts Creek. It is also pumped from the river for town use in Bruthen, as well by private water users along the river.

== See also ==
- List of rivers of Australia
