= Bruthen =

- Town
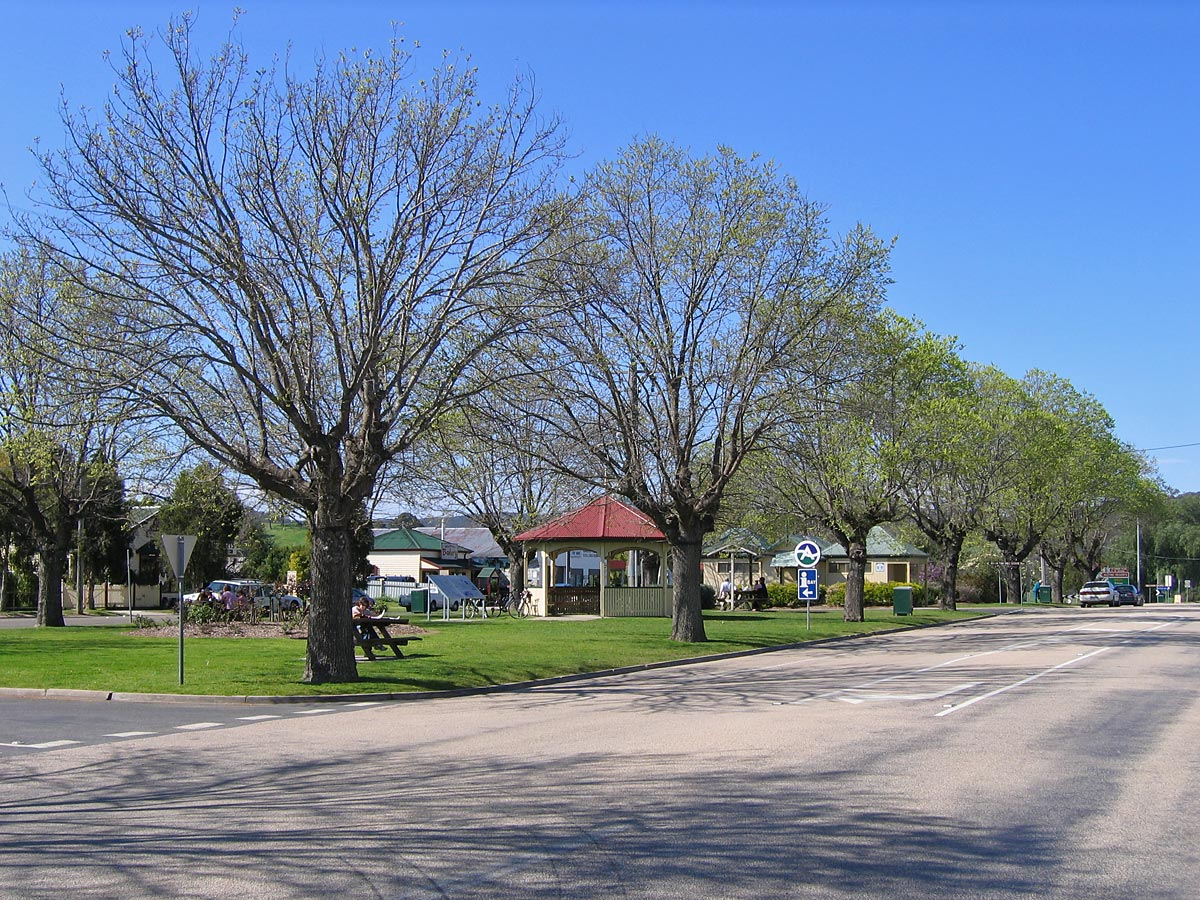
- Looking east along the Great Alpine Road in Bruthen from the western side of town

- Interactive map of Bruthen
- Coordinates: 37°43′0″S 147°49′0″E
- Country: Australia
- State: Victoria
- LGA: Shire of East Gippsland
- Location: 311 km (193 mi) E of Melbourne; 26 km (16 mi) E of Bairnsdale

Government
  - State electorate: Gippsland East
  - Federal division: Gippsland

Population
  - Total: 814 (2016 census)
- Postcode: 3885
- County: Buln Buln

Bruthen is a town located alongside the Tambo River between Bairnsdale and Ensay on the Great Alpine Road in East Gippsland, Victoria, Australia. At the 2016 census, Bruthen had a population of 814. Bruthen is 26 km (16 mi) east of Bairnsdale and 311 km (193 mi) east of the state capital Melbourne.

== History ==
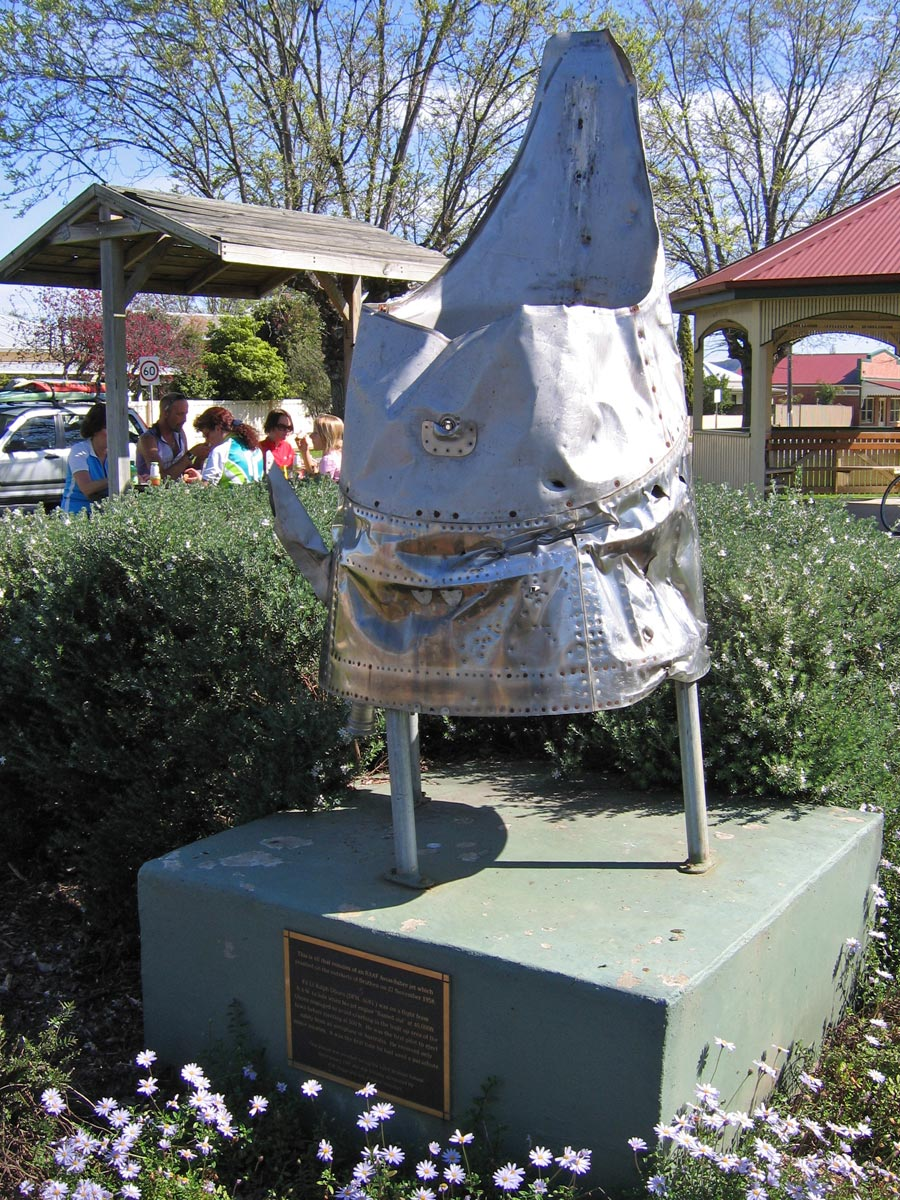
All that remains of the RAAF jet that crashed at Bruthen in 1958

The origin of the name Bruthen is disputed. One version has it as an anglicisation of the Scotts-gaelic word 'Sruthán' meaning 'creek' or 'small stream', given to the location where Deep Creek flows into the Tambo River by Angus McMillan in 1840. Another version has it as named after one of the last of the Indigenous traditional elders of the GanaiKurnai Brabiralung tribe of the immediate area, Bruthen-munji, who died in approximately 1862. The area was later renamed Tambo, and changed again to Wiseleigh when the township of Bruthen was established at the new permanent location. Alfred Howitt claimed the proper name for the area around Bruthen was Murloo, meaning 'pipeclay'.

Angus McMillan, first passed through the area of what is now Bruthen on 14 April 1840 from the Omeo region. The Post Office opened on 15 January 1862 and the first school opened in 1872.

On 27 November 1958 an RAAF Avon-Sabre Fighter Jet crashed on the outskirts of Bruthen, narrowly missing the populated area of town. Flight Lieutenant Ralph Oborn was flying from New South Wales to the RAAF base in Sale when his engine 'flamed out'. Oborn ejected at 500 ft, suffering only minor injuries, and became the first person to safely eject from an aeroplane in Australia.

The Bruthen Court of Petty Sessions closed in 1969.

== Facilities ==
Bruthen has a small shopping centre, including a general store (established in 1860 and it continues to be run out of a period building), bakery, post office, hotel, service station, as well as speciality stores and cafes. One of the new local features is the Bullant Brewery which offers meals and a variety of locally brewed Victorian beers. Bruthen also has a Police station, State Emergency Service and Country Fire Authority (CFA) branches, an Anglican church, a cemetery and a primary school.

A railway line used to pass through town, with the railway station just to the east of the township; the station site remains as does a former railway tunnel under the main road and a railway bridge, the Storer Bridge, over the Tambo River, these facilities remaining in use as part of the shared use East Gippsland rail trail.

== Activities ==
The Bruthen community holds a number of activities throughout the year. These include the "Mixed Bag" art exhibition, the Bruthen Village Markets (every 4th Saturday of the month), annual Parish dance, and the Bruthen Blues & Arts Festival on the 3rd weekend of February each year. The 96 km (60 mi) East Gippsland rail trail, which runs from Bairnsdale to Orbost, passes through Bruthen, providing an excellent facility for cycling, walking and horse-riding. In November 2012, 3,500 cyclists spent their first night in Bruthen as part of the nine-day Great Victorian Bike Ride from Lakes Entrance to Phillip Island..

== Sports ==
In Australian rules football the Bruthen Football Club competes in the Omeo & District Football League (ODFL), and has the nickname 'The Bulldogs'. The club has won six premierships (1979, 1984, 1985, 1989, 1990, and 2003) since joining the league in 1978. The affiliated Bruthen Netball Club competes in the associated netball competition.

The Bruthen colours are red, white and blue. Bruthen football jumpers consist of red and white hoops on a blue background, essentially the design of what was formerly Footscray, and now the Western Bulldogs AFL club. The netball club wears a white shirt with red stripe and navy blue skirt.

Other sports in the town include tennis, cricket and lawn bowls and shooting clubs.

Geocaching is also popular in the Bruthen area with a range of single and multiple caches to be found!

== Service Clubs ==
The Bruthen Lions Club actively participate in local events and constantly raise a substantial amount of money for local causes each year.

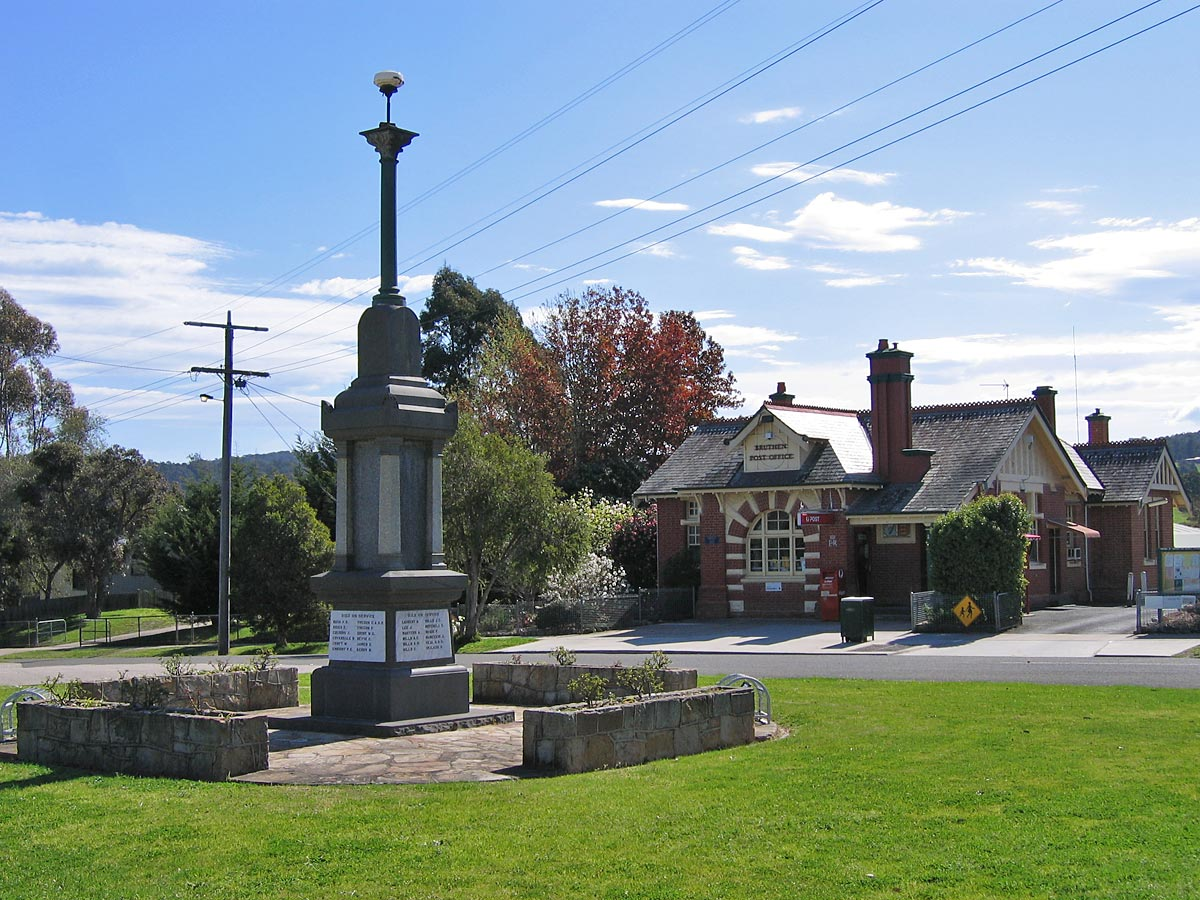
The Bruthen War Memorial and Post Office on the Great Alpine Road

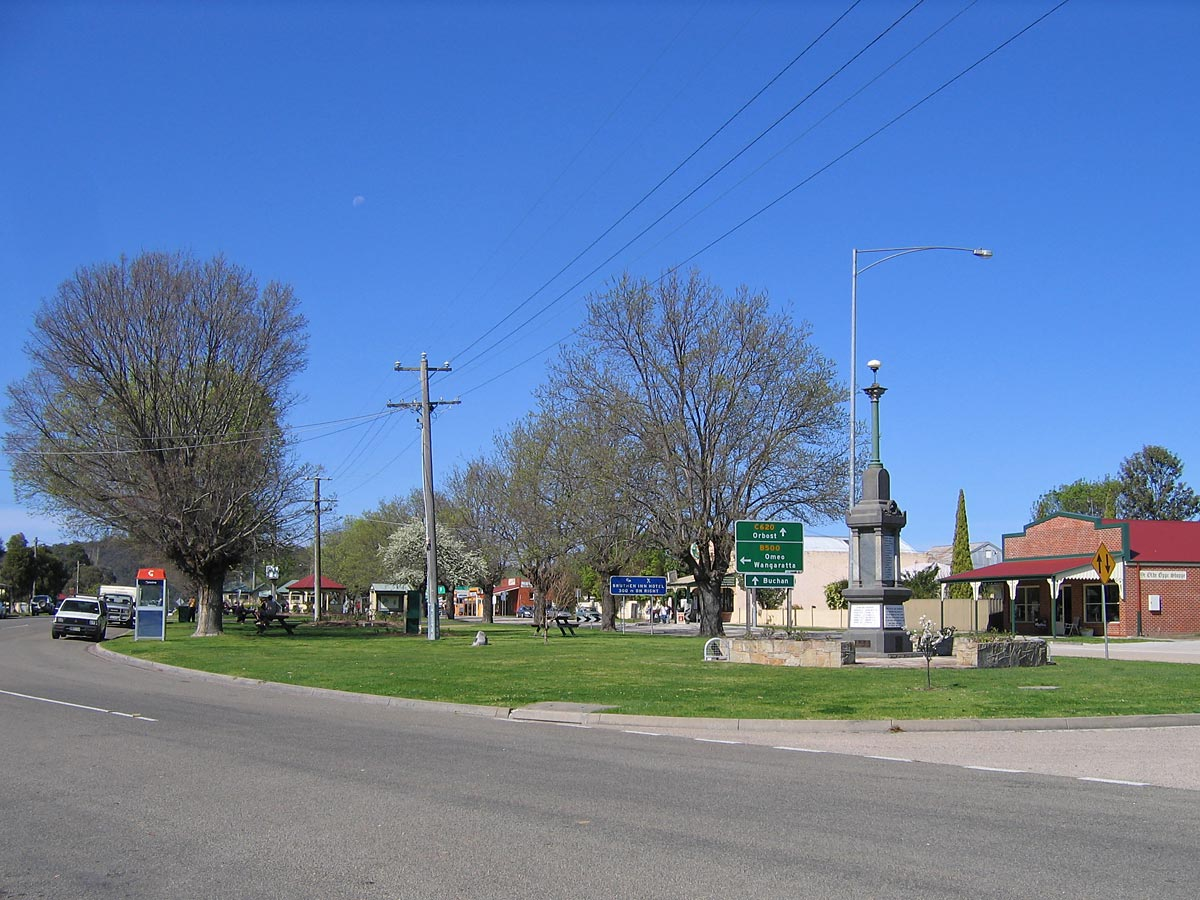
Attractive road reserve between the Great Alpine Road and a service road

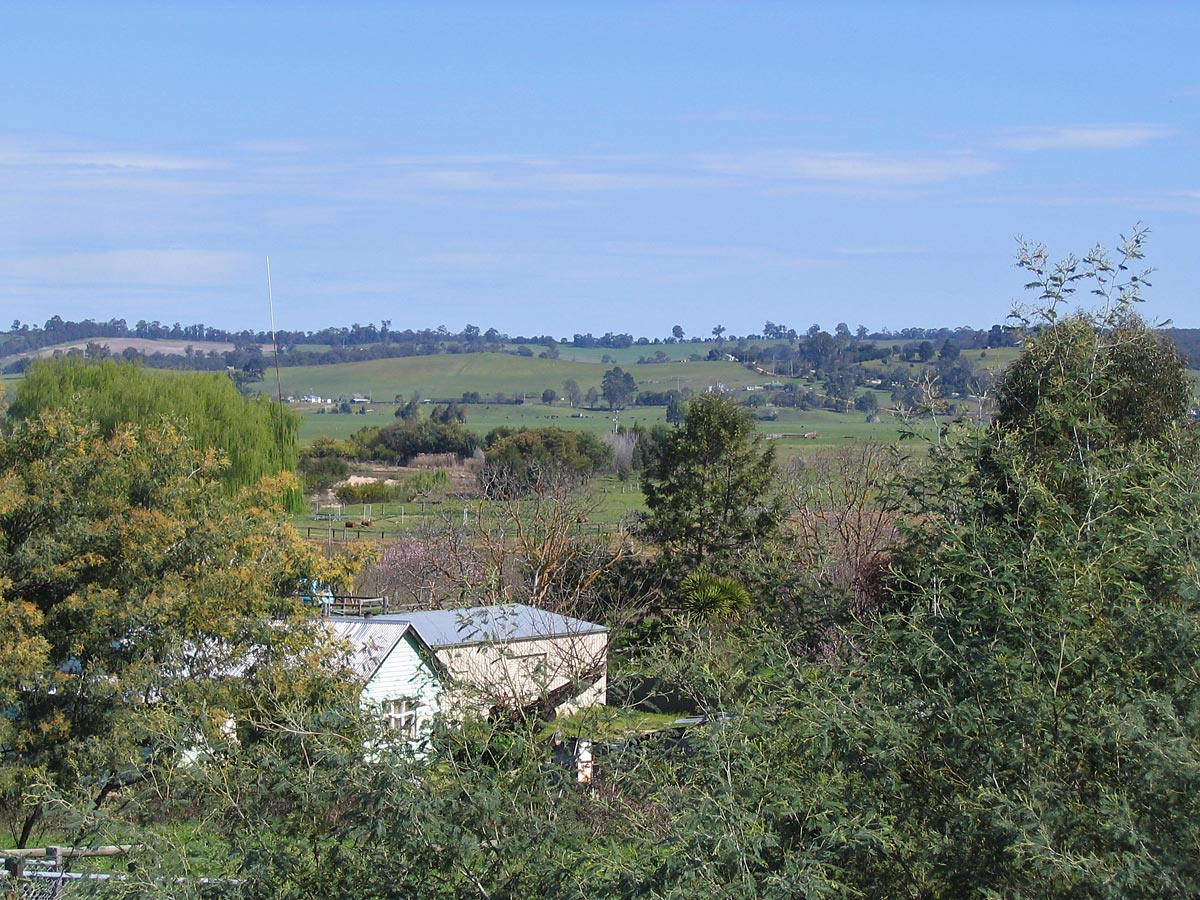
Typical farmland found at Bruthen on the lower reaches of the Tambo River

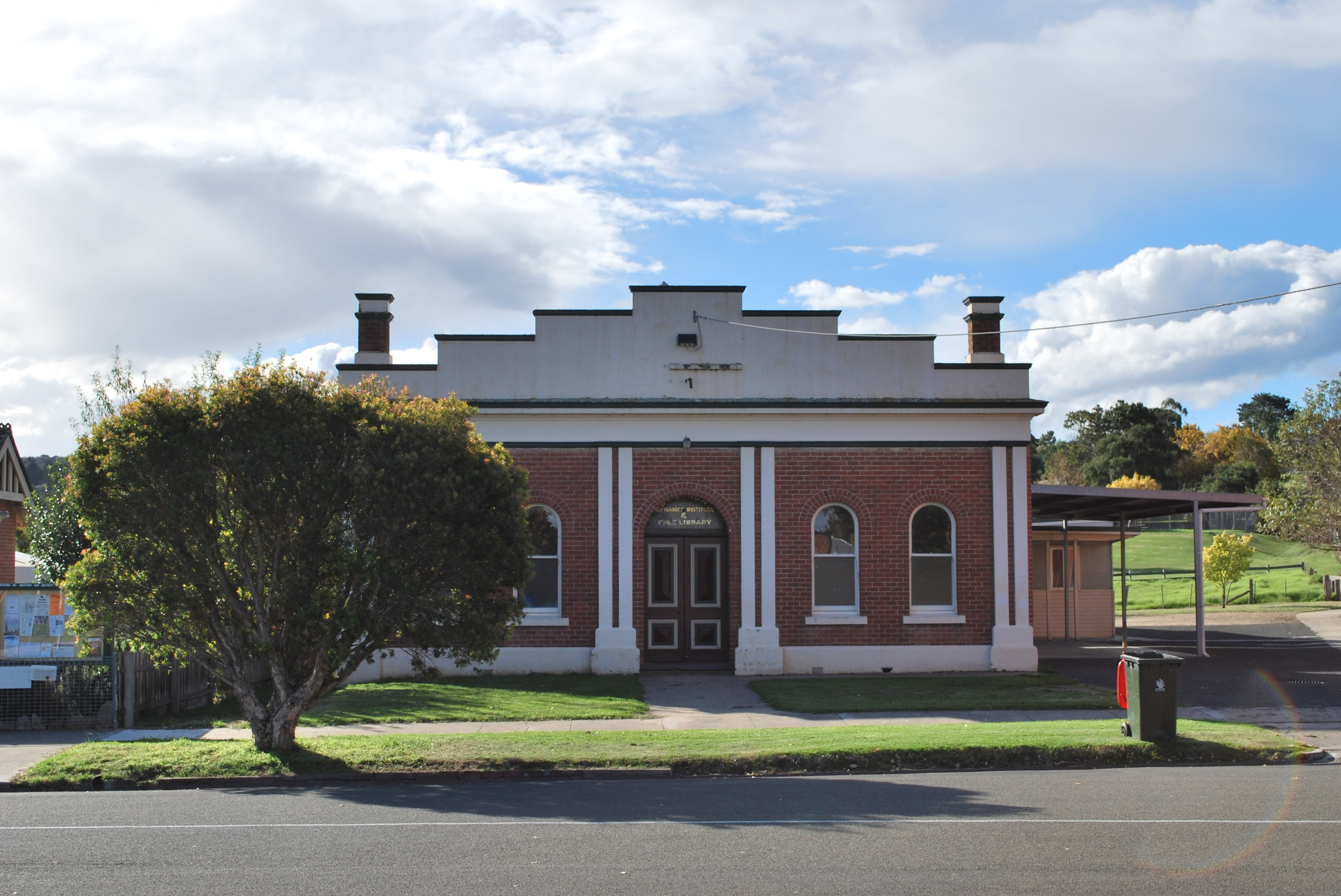
Bruthen Mechanics Institute
