= East Gippsland Rail Trail =

Pathway in Victoria, Australia

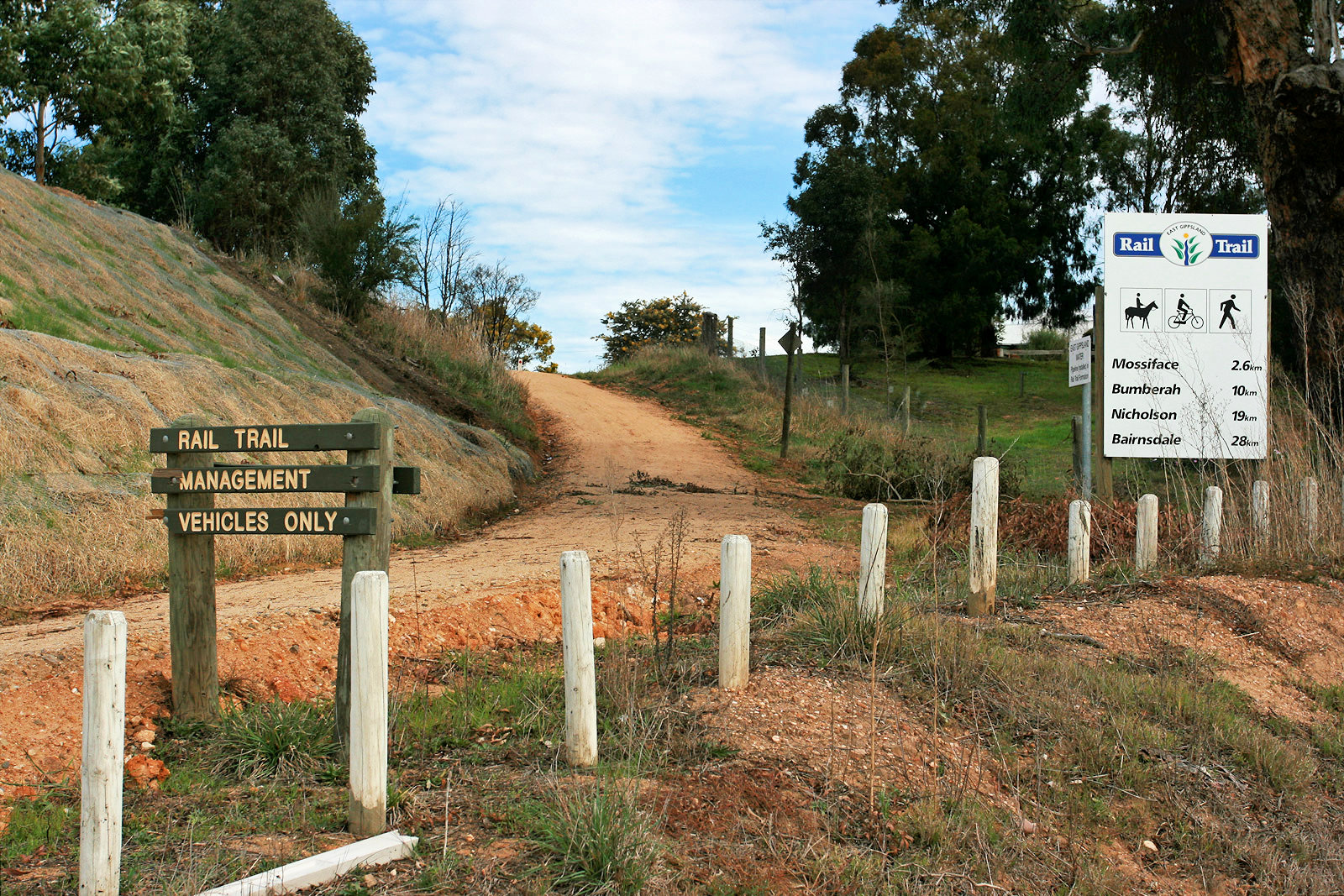
- Trail signage and the trail near Bruthen
- Length: 96 kilometres (60 mi)
- Location: East Gippsland, Victoria, Australia
- Use: Hiking, biking, walking
- Highest point: 129 metres (423 ft) (Colquhoun railway station)
- Grade: Sealed, smooth gravel, stony gravel, and dirt
- Difficulty: Easy to medium
- Hazards: Uncontrolled crossings of major highways, isolated locations
- Surface: Sealed, smooth gravel, stony gravel, and dirt
- Website: www.eastgippslandrailtrail.com.au

Trail map
- East Gippsland Trail Map

The East Gippsland Rail Trail is a rail trail located in East Gippsland in Victoria, Australia. The trail is a popular cycling route, beginning in Bairnsdale and extending to Orbost, following the route of the former Gippsland railway line. The Gippsland railway line was opened in 1916 to serve the agricultural and timber industry, and required numerous substantial bridges because of the nature of the terrain. Due to the decline in traffic and heavy operating costs, the line was finally closed in August 1987 and the track infrastructure removed in 1994. The shared trail is also available for walkers and recreational horseriding, however motorised vehicles are prohibited.

The trail is 96 kilometres (60 mi) long and passes through a variety of forest and farmland landscapes with occasional views of the Gippsland Lakes. Parts of the trail are accessible to any bicycle, but significant sections are suitable only for mountain bikes or sturdy hybrid bikes.

== Route description ==
The East Gippsland Rail Trail travels from just east of the current Bairnsdale railway station along the old Gippsland railway line easement, past or through the small towns of Nicholson, Bruthen, Nowa Nowa, and Newmerella, with a short connecting path taking it into Orbost. Water and most facilities are only available in these towns, so trail users are required to be self-sufficient. The trail follows the long gradual inclines and sweeping curves of the former railway line, reaching a maximum altitude of 129m at Colquhoun.

Along its route it passes the former railway stations and/or sidings at Nicholson, Bumberrah, Mossiface, Bruthen, Colquhoun, Nowa Nowa, Tostaree, Waygara and Orbost. It passes across or past a number of former railway bridges including some large trestle bridges, and starts alongside the Mitchell River and crosses the Nicholson River, Tambo River and Snowy River, as well as several minor watercourses on its way to Orbost.

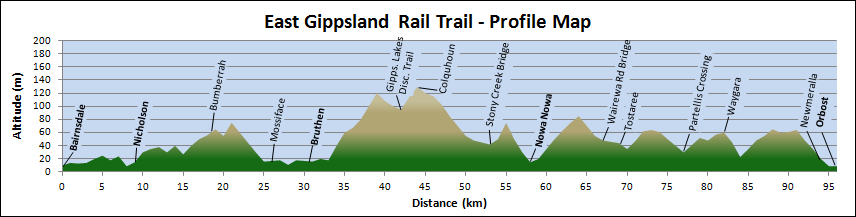
Profile map of the East Gippsland Rail Trail

=== Bairnsdale to Nicholson (9km) ===
The East Gippsland Rail Trail does not officially begin at the Bairnsdale railway station itself due to the poor condition of the old rail bridge over the Mitchell River. The trail begins on the south side of the Princes Highway opposite the Howitt Park sports grounds at McEacharn Street.

The rail trail is accessible from the town via the road or footpath on the Princes Highway road bridge across the river. Toilets and good car parking facilities are available in the main section of Howitt Park on the north side of Princes Highway. Safe access to the south side of the highway and the rail trail can be obtained by following the path alongside the Mitchell River under the road bridge and up to road level, then along between the highway and the Howitt Park sports grounds.

The trail travels east from Bairnsdale following the route of the old railway line and roughly follows the line of the Princes Highway. The trail initially passes between industrial and retail properties leading out of Bairnsdale, then travels mainly through open farmland, predominantly for cattle and horse grazing, to the town of Nicholson.

There are distant views of the Gippsland Lakes in some sections and a number of crossings of minor roads are required as well as an unsigned crossing of the Princes Highway. The surface is sealed with asphalt and is in fair to good condition as far as the Nicholson River bridge in Nicholson, 9 km from the start of the route. The bridge is the former railway bridge across the river, now sealed with concrete, while just before the bridge is a station name board marking the site of the former Nicholson railway station.

The trail passes just to the north of the Nicholson township. Access to the town itself can be gained either by turning south at the Nicholson-Sarsfield Road, or by following a minor track along the west side of the Nicholson River. Toilets, water and barbecue facilities are available at the Nicholson boat ramp on the west bank of the river to the south of the Princes Highway.

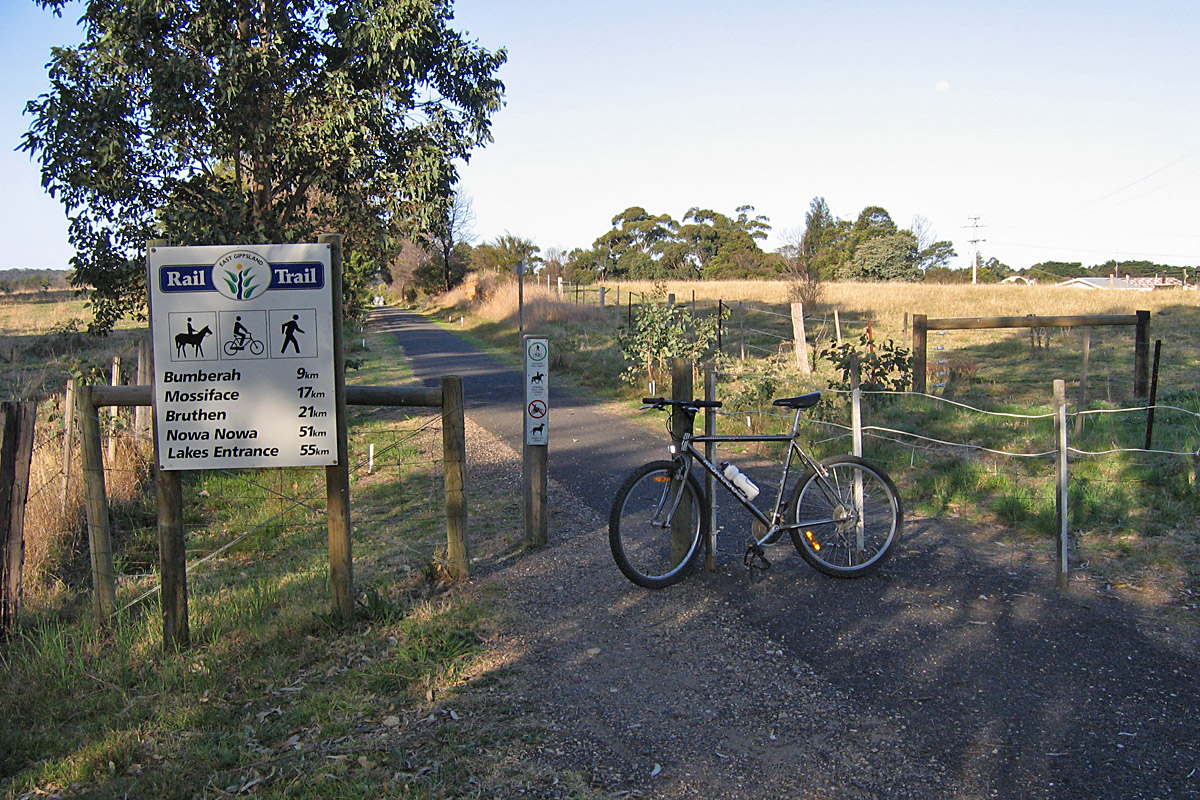
Heading east along the rail trail at Nicholson, 9 km from Bairnsdale

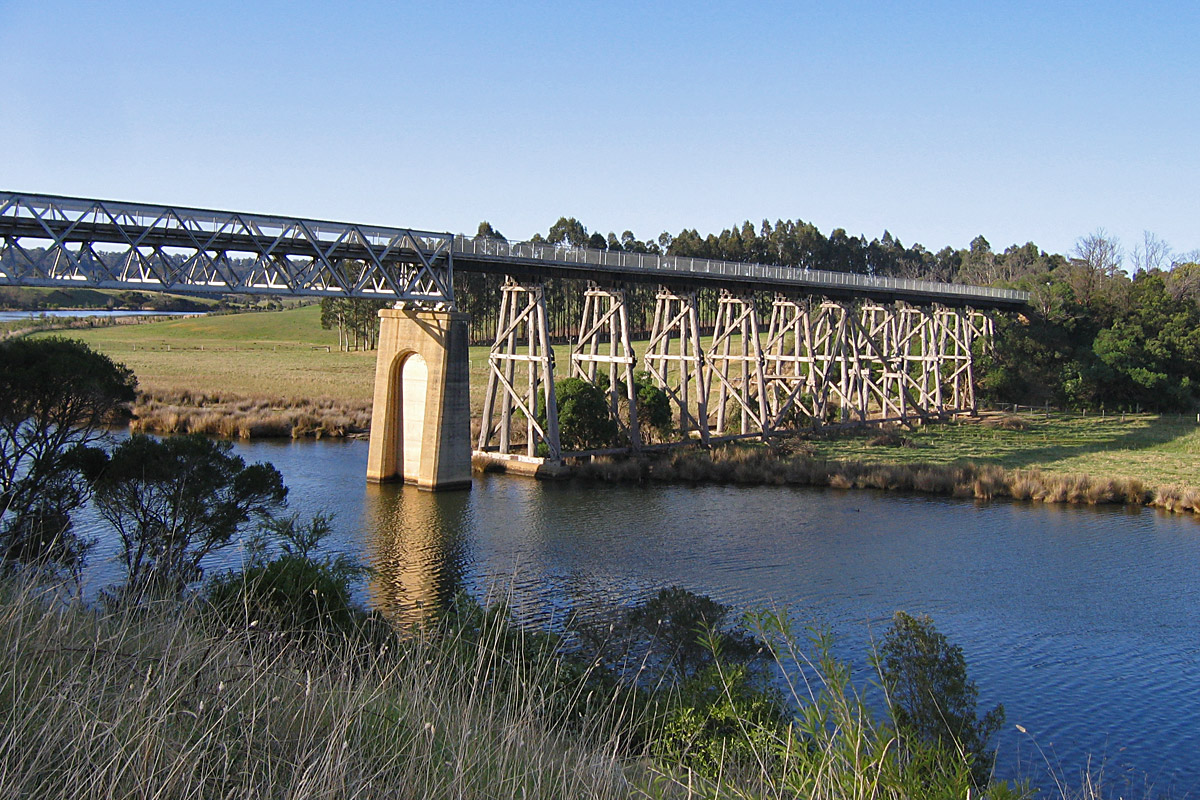
The trail crosses the Nicholson River on a former railway bridge

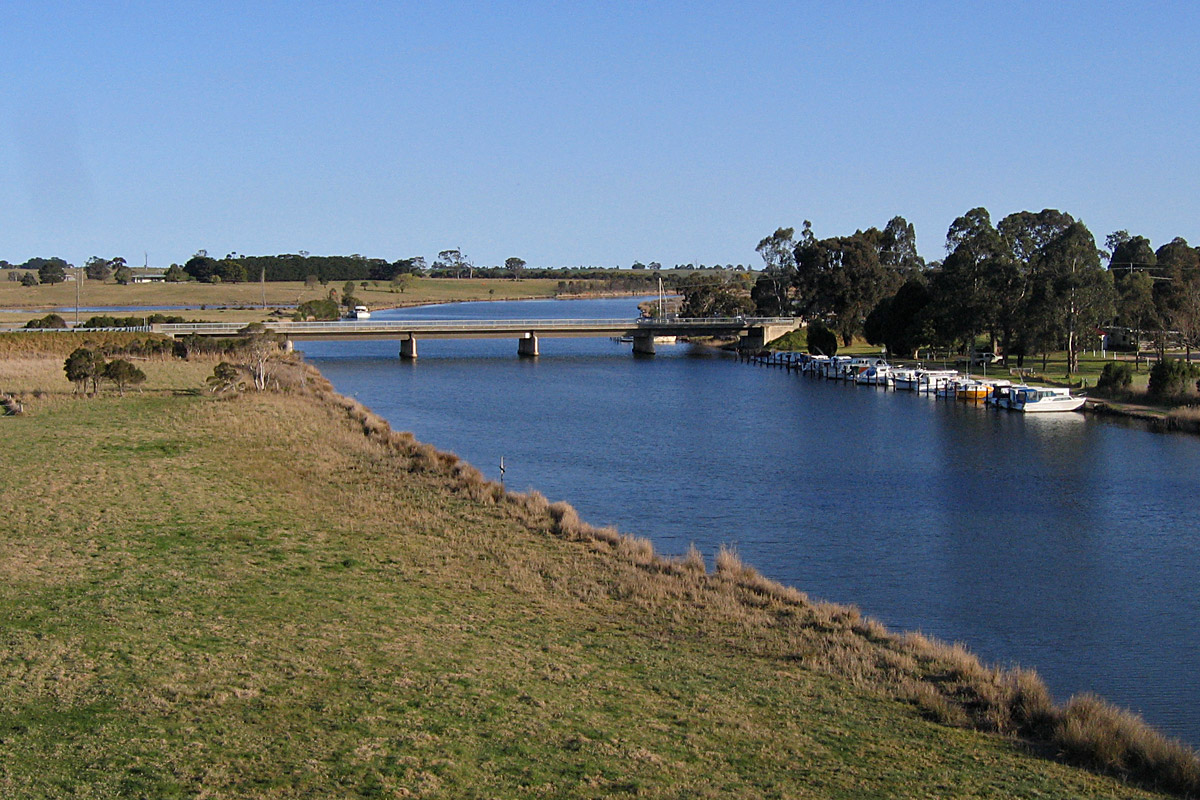
View from the former railway bridge at Nicholson

=== Nicholson to Bruthen (22km) ===
The rail trail crosses the Nicholson River on the former railway bridge. The bridge surface has been sealed with concrete and affords excellent views. Beyond the bridge the track heads inland away from the Princes Highway, and remains asphalt until Stephensons Road, and the surface then becomes a smooth compacted gravel. The trail passes through undulating farmland, veering from its easterly route to northerly direction on a gradually rougher track surface, and after 9 km reaches the old Bumberrah railway station where there is a rest stop with a shelter and information board in a remnant grassy woodland reserve.

From Bumberrah the trail travels 8.5 km on to Mossiface, passing through various cuttings, fills and tunnels from the old rail route. The surface is smooth compacted gravel of good standard through much of this section, including occasional wombat holes, but there is significant flora and fauna, as well as some good views of adjacent farmland and hills. Mossiface, a tiny locality of only a few houses and facilities, was the site of the former Mossiface railway station and offers views of the Tambo River flats and historic hop kilns of the region.

Following Mossiface the trail continues north for about 2.5 km on a smooth gravel surface and crosses the Great Alpine Road at the site of a former railway trestle bridge which used to take the railway over the highway. The section at the trestle bridge is subject to mud and water inundation after rainfall. Just past the trestle bridge, 2 km out of Bruthen, the track diverges, with one route (the Bruthen-Wiseleigh path) travelling alongside the Great Alpine Road directly into Bruthen, while the rail trail proper continues to follow the route of the old railway about 100m north of the road.

About half a kilometre before the town the remains of the former Bruthen railway station can clearly be seen on the rail trail. Shortly past the station site a minor detour from the trail can be taken in order to enter Bruthen itself, the largest town en route, where major facilities such as food, drink, toilets and accommodation are available.

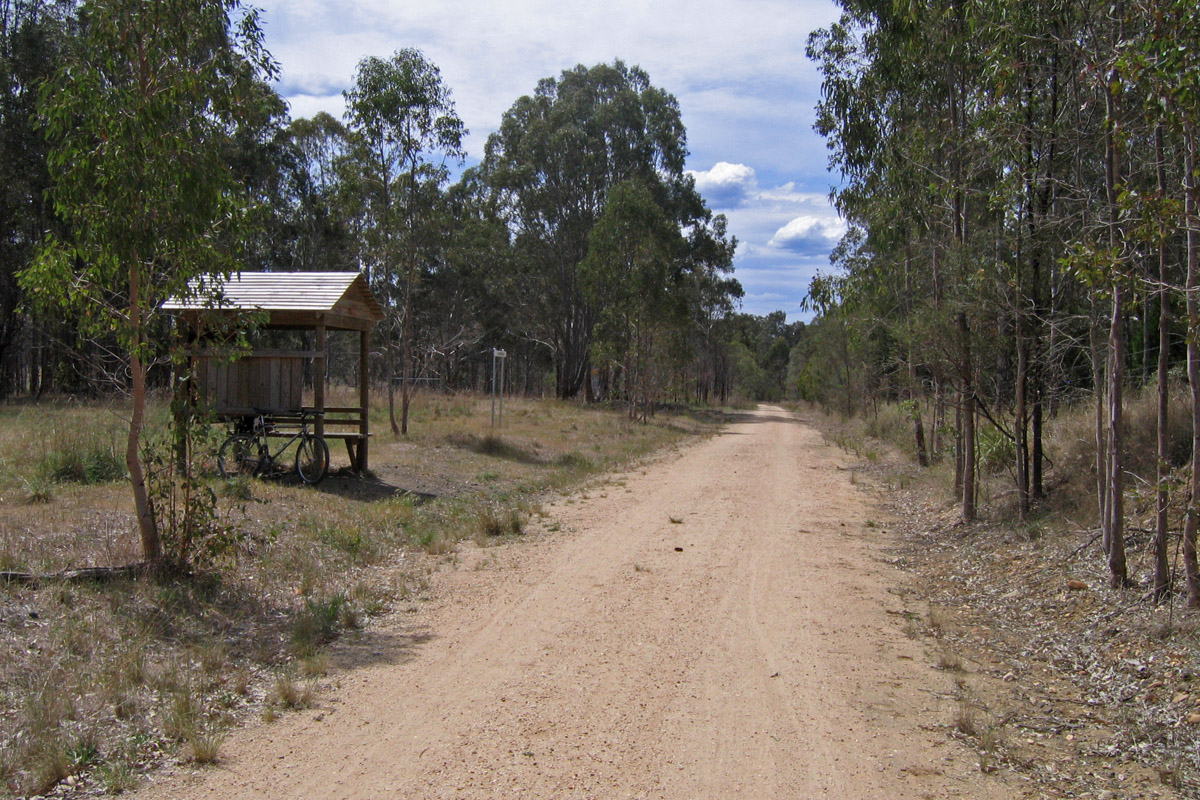
Looking north from the former Bumberrah Station between Nicholson and Bruthen

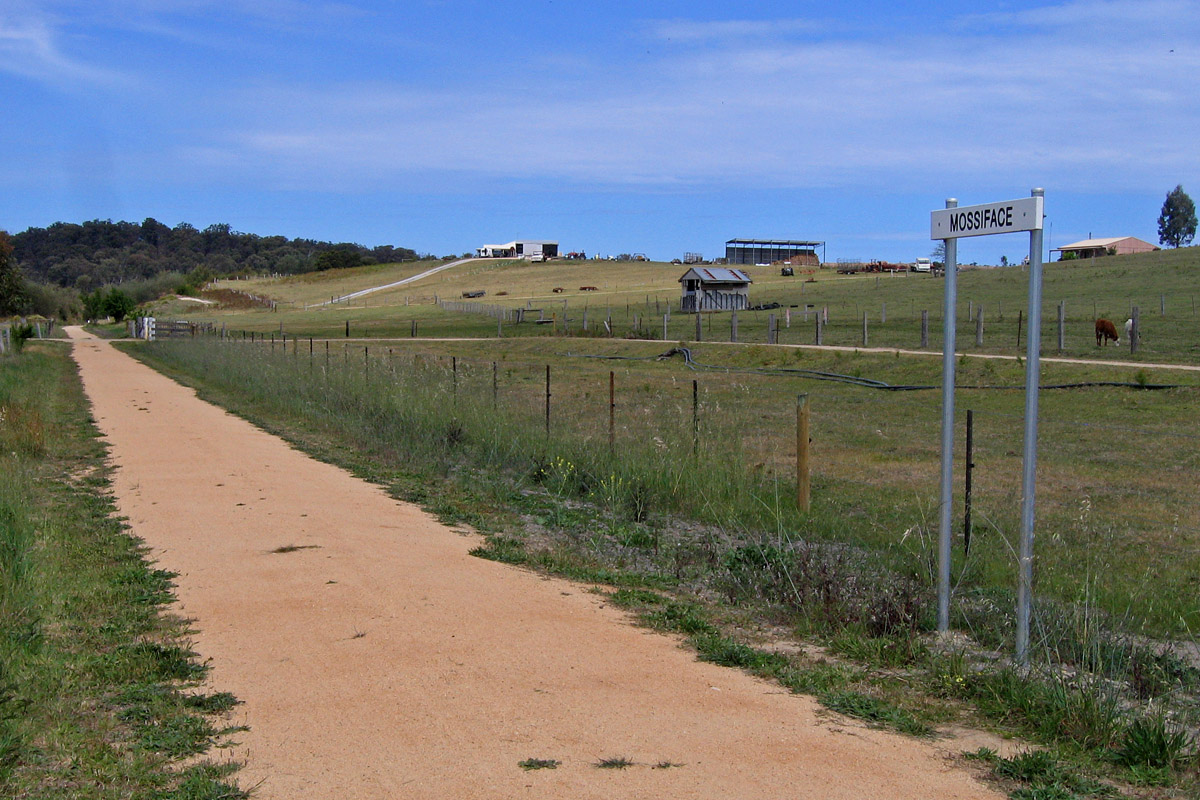
Looking south at the site of the former Mossiface Railway Station

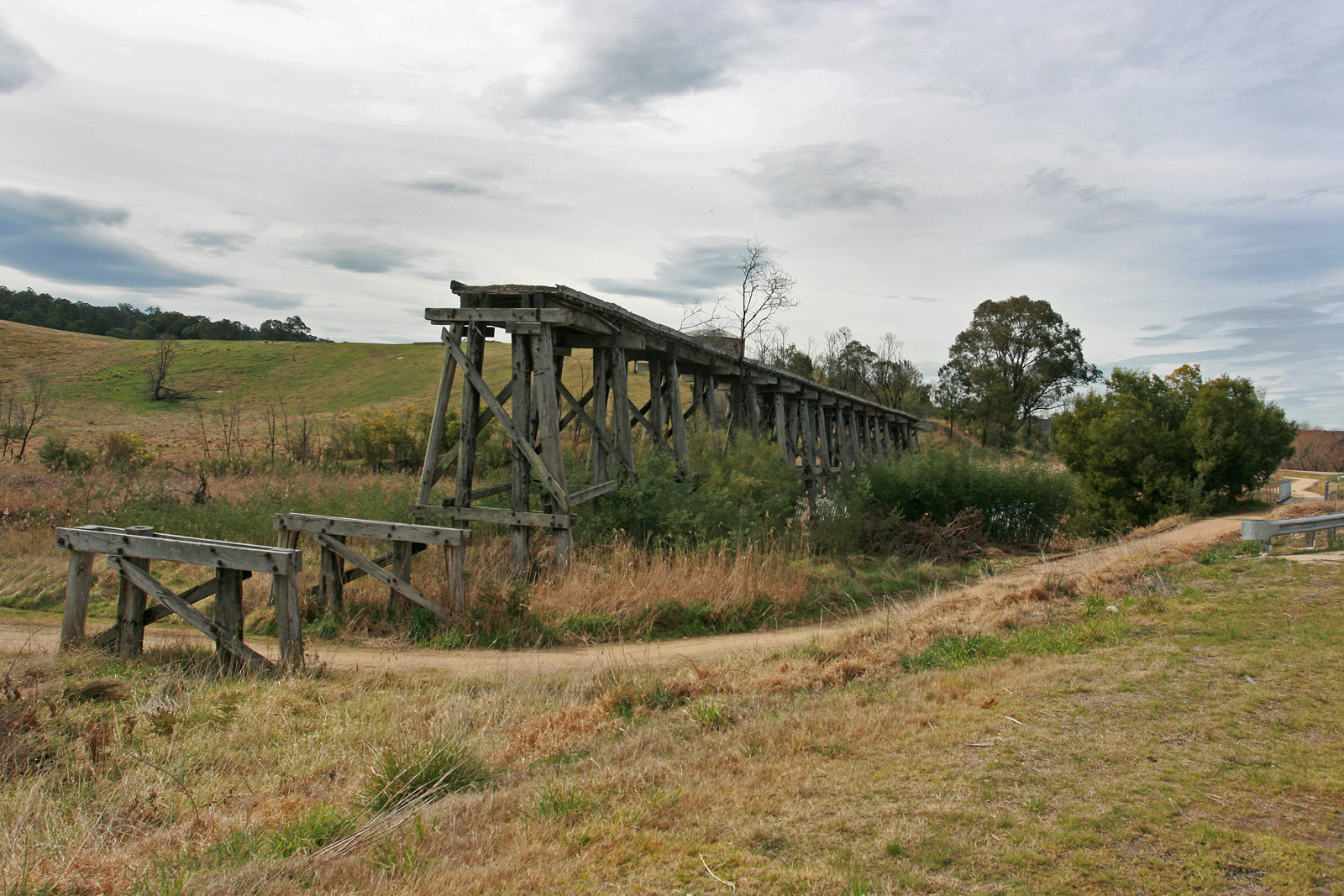
The trail passes through and beside a former railway trestle bridge west of Bruthen

=== Bruthen to Nowa Nowa (27km) ===
The rail trail continues from the Bruthen Station site and passes below the Great Alpine Road through the former railway tunnel. It then skirts around the southern edge of Bruthen following the route of the railway line. The trail goes over the Storer Bridge, a former railway bridge over the Tambo River now sealed with boards as the trail surface, and then passes behind the sports ground at the eastern edge of the town, where an alternative detour into Bruthen can be accessed.

After leaving Bruthen the trail surface quality declines and becomes more like a dirt back road with some gravel - it passes through some grazing land on a smooth gravel surface, then enters an open eucalyptus forest, the Colquhoun State Forest, where it climbs steadily for several kilometres on a stony gravel surface suffering from a fair degree of washboarding, along with some sandy sections. At Seaton Track in the Colquhoun Forest, 11 km out of Bruthen, the Gippsland Lakes Discovery Trail provides a connection to Lakes Entrance, approximately 25 km to the south. This section of the trail is suitable for mountain bikes only.

The East Gippsland Rail Trail itself continues east through the Colquhoun State Forest on a generally good surface at a gradual decline. A few kilometres on from the Discovery Trail turnoff is the site of the former Colquhoun railway station and siding, which, at 129m is the highest point on the trail, however the site is rapidly being overgrown by forest. Further along, about 4.5 km west of Nowa Nowa is the spectacular Stony Creek Trestle Bridge, built in the early 1900s and measuring 276m long and 19m high. Due to its poor condition the bridge itself is fenced off, and trail users must travel down and up the steep slopes of the Stony Creek valley to reach the far side. A car park, toilet and picnic facilities are available at this location.

The trail continues to the small town of Nowa Nowa where it diverts through the town, departing from the former railway route. It runs onto an old section of the highway and down to the Lakes Entrance Road, where it then turns sharply onto a concrete path through the town. The path takes an underpass below the highway and leaves town after crossing a bridge over Boggy Creek, finally rejoining the original railway route beyond the east side of the town.

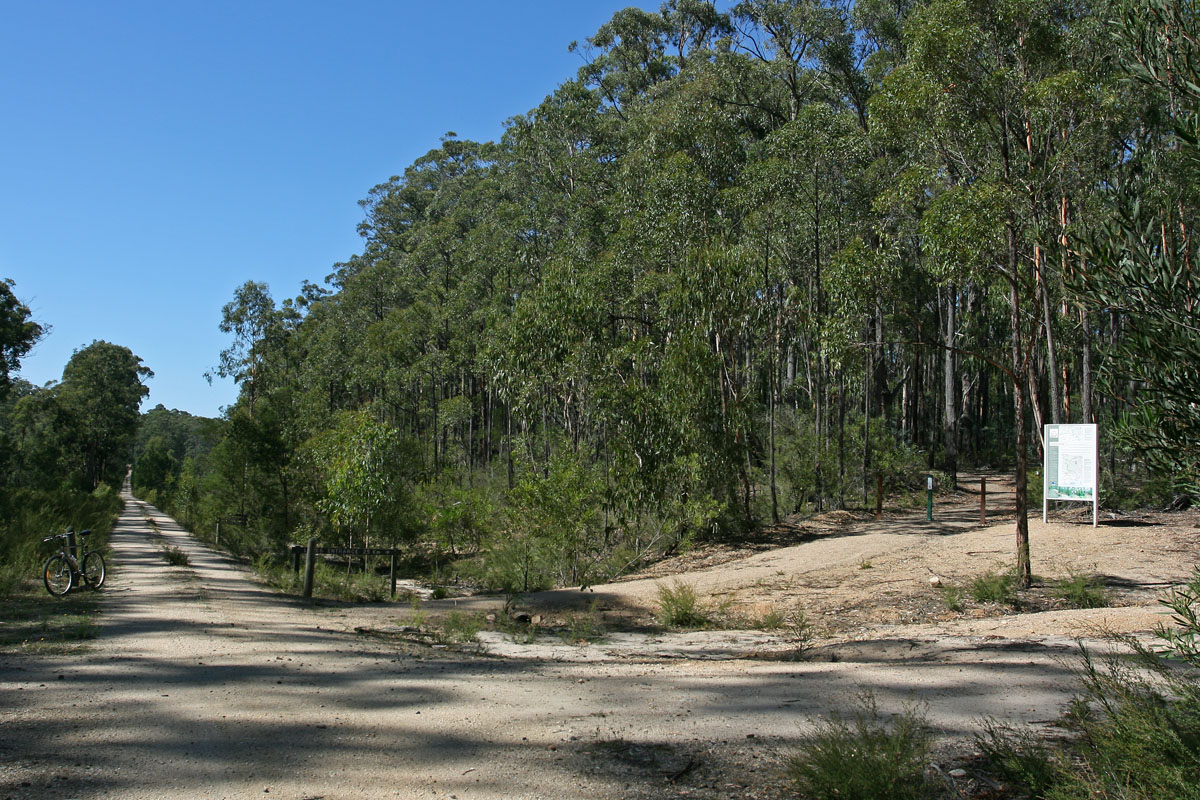
Looking east at the junction with the Gippsland Lakes Discovery Trail in the Colquhoun Forest

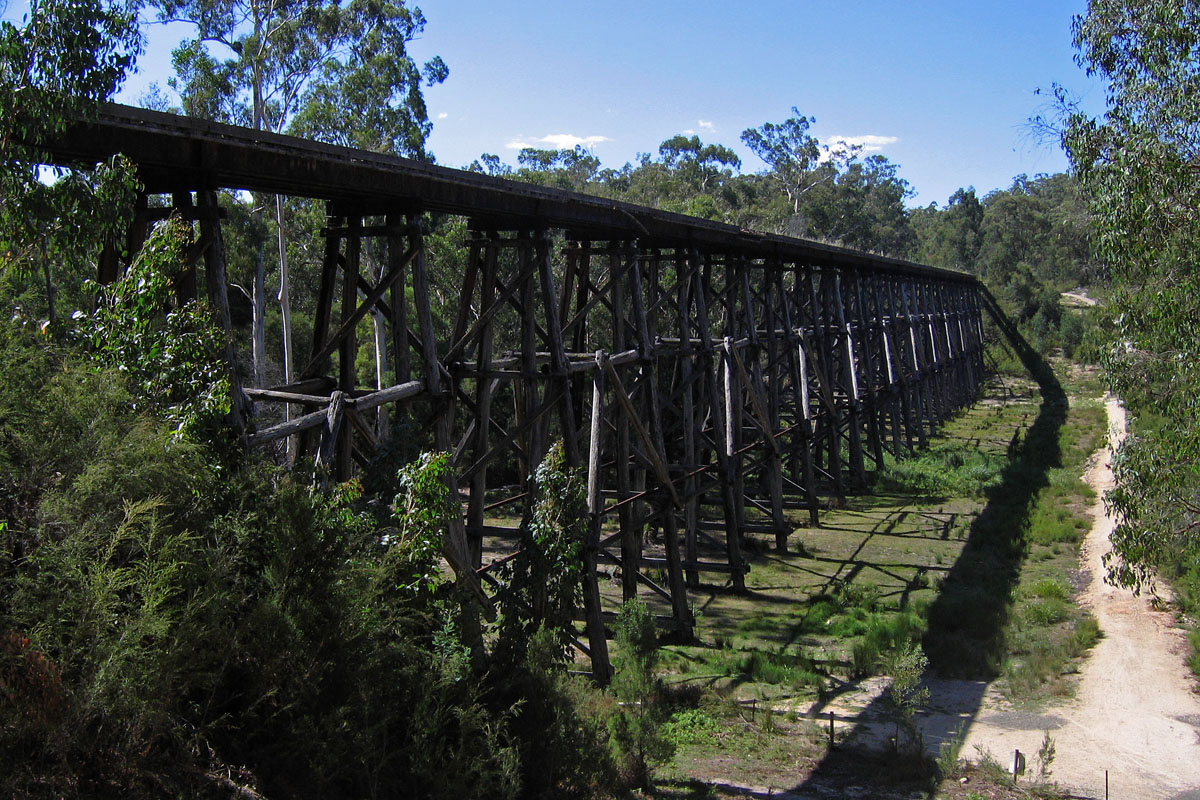
The trail on the valley floor beside the Stony Creek Trestle Bridge near Nowa Nowa

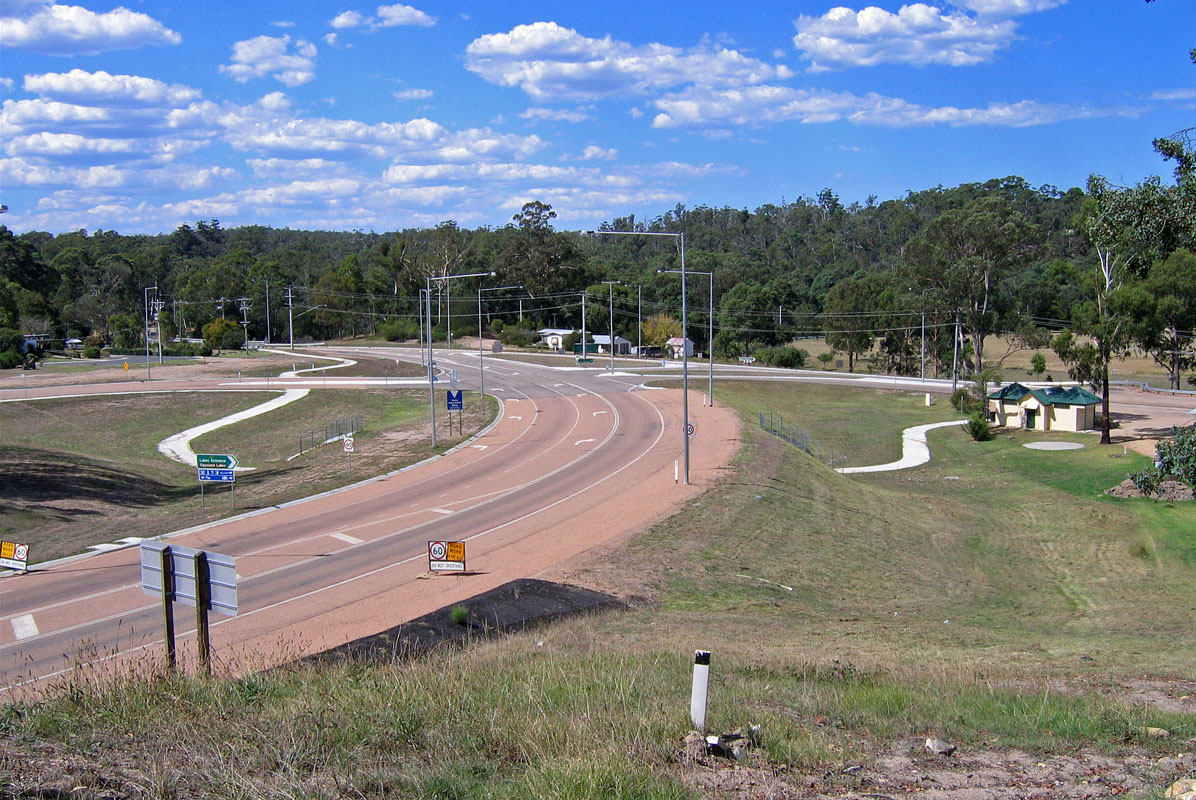
The sealed trail passes through an underpass below the highway in Nowa Nowa

=== Nowa Nowa to Orbost (38km) ===
The 36 km Nowa Nowa to Newmerella section was the last section of the track to open, being constructed in 2005 at a cost of $660,000 and opening in January 2006, with a further 2 km of shared pathway taking the trail into Orbost.

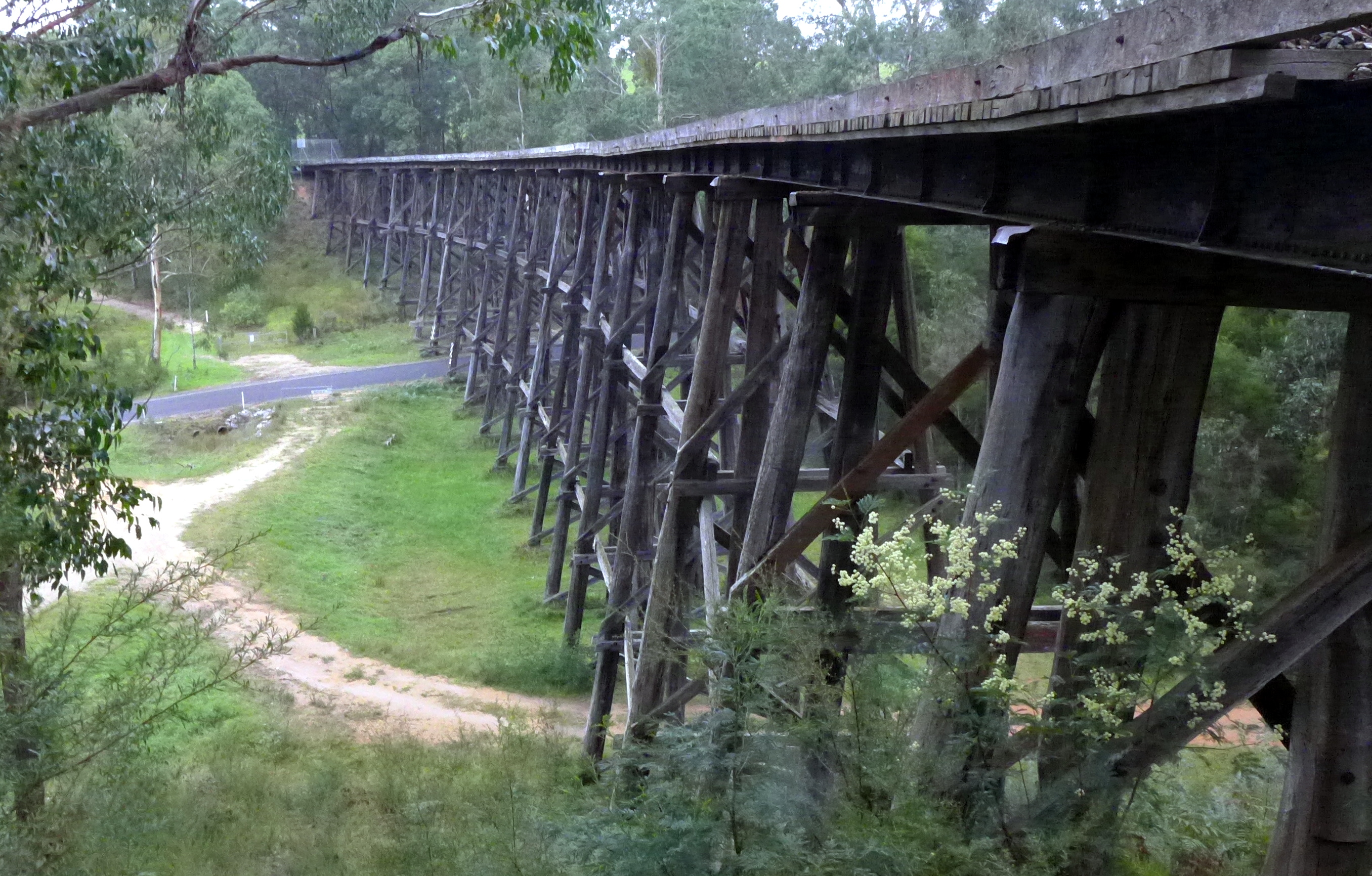
The Wairewa Rd trestle bridge.

The track leaves Nowa Nowa after crossing the bridge over Boggy Creek and soon rejoins the railway line formation. The former Nowa Nowa railway station is just north of the realigned rail trail, with the station site itself now used as an emergency helicopter landing place. Not far from town the track descends to a creek level crossing over Ironstone Creek, bypassing the first and smallest of three wooden trestle bridges in this section. Following this the track steadily climbs over several kilometres on a rough loose gravel surface through a gradually drier environment largely composed of banksia and eucalypt vegetation, and areas of open farmland, then descends towards Wairewa Road about 9 km from Nowa Nowa. The original rail line crossed this spot on a spectacular curved timber trestle bridge, the largest of the three on this part of the route. While the bridge remains, the trail again bypasses it due to the costs that would be involved in making and keeping the bridge safe, descending down and across Wairewa Road, then climbing back up to the level of the railway.

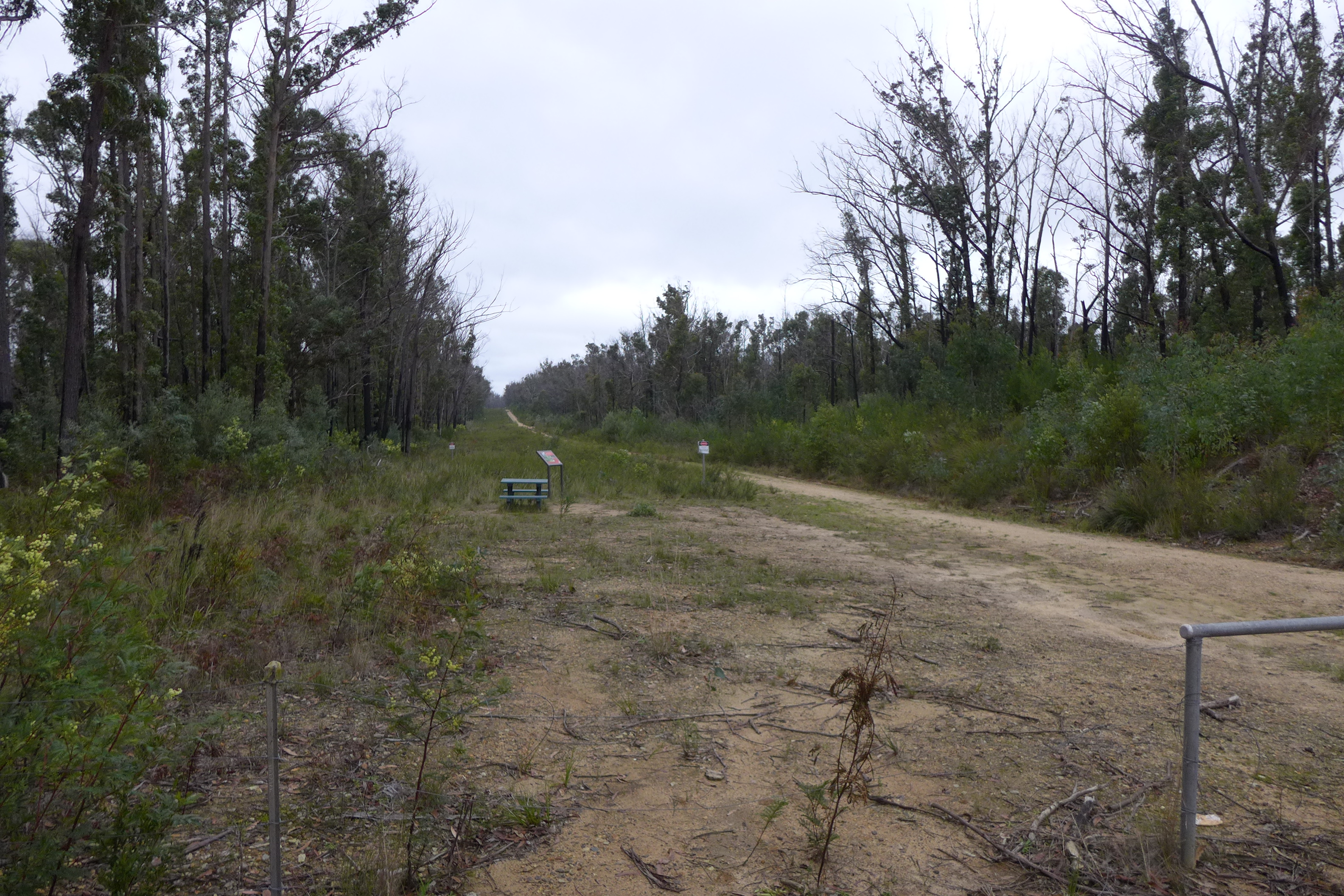
Typical scenery between Nowa Nowa and Orbost.

Beyond this point the trail heads back towards the Princes Highway and then runs close to it for several kilometres. Near Johnsons Road the trail passes the unmarked site of the former Tostaree railway station and travels just north of the small locality of Tostaree, and then drops down to another low level creek crossing over Hospital Creek, bypassing the third of the former railway trestle bridges. The track climbs again and soon diverges from the highway, then travels through light forest and occasional farmland on a quite wide but rough surface, before reaching Partellis Crossing Road at about the midpoint of this section of the trail. There is a picnic table, seats, and toilet facilities at this location, however no water is available.

Continuing on from Partellis Crossing the trail continues for several kilometres through mixed forest and farmland, and then past the former timber mill site of Waygara. Native vegetation is reclaiming this site but some signs of the former mill are visible such as a shed, an incinerator stack, and former mill houses. The former Waygara railway station was also in this location, however little sign remains of it. The trail again starts heading back towards the highway and soon crosses Simpsons Creek and then Simpsons Creek Rd through more forested areas which preserve a significant amount of biological diversity from early and pre-European settlement times.

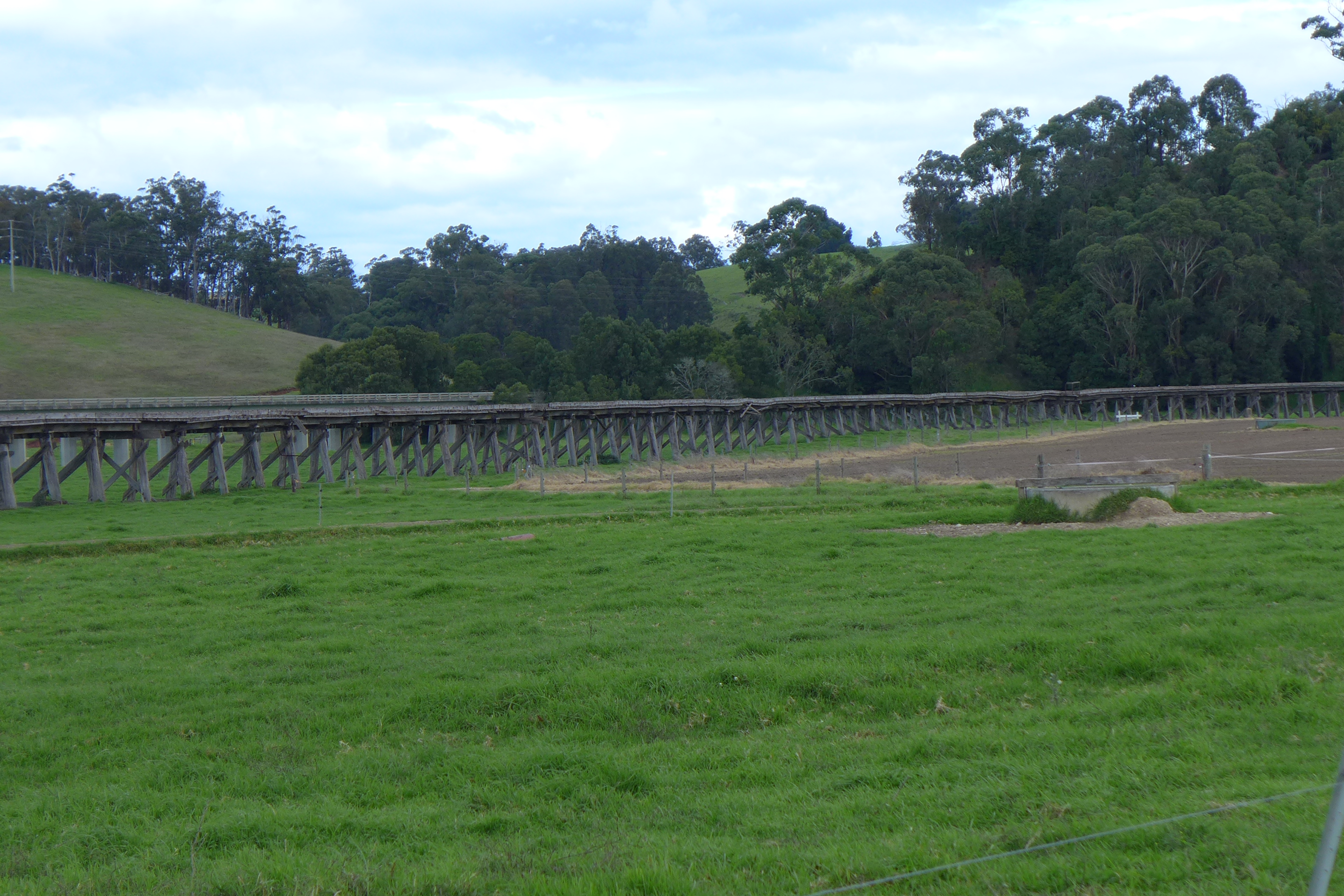
Low level causeway on the outskirts of Orbost.

Another 3 km on is the first crossing of Joiners Rd, and from this point to Newmerella - about 5 km distance - the trail travels very closely to the Princes Highway with increasing signs of development such as timber mill operations and a pumping station for the underground gas pipeline. The trail crosses Prestons Road, which provides access to the small town of Newmerella, while the trail itself continues for another couple of kilometres, doglegging through a cutting around a steep hillside, then providing views over the Snowy River floodplain before descending to the end of the trail at Burn Rd, north of the Princes Highway at Newmerella.

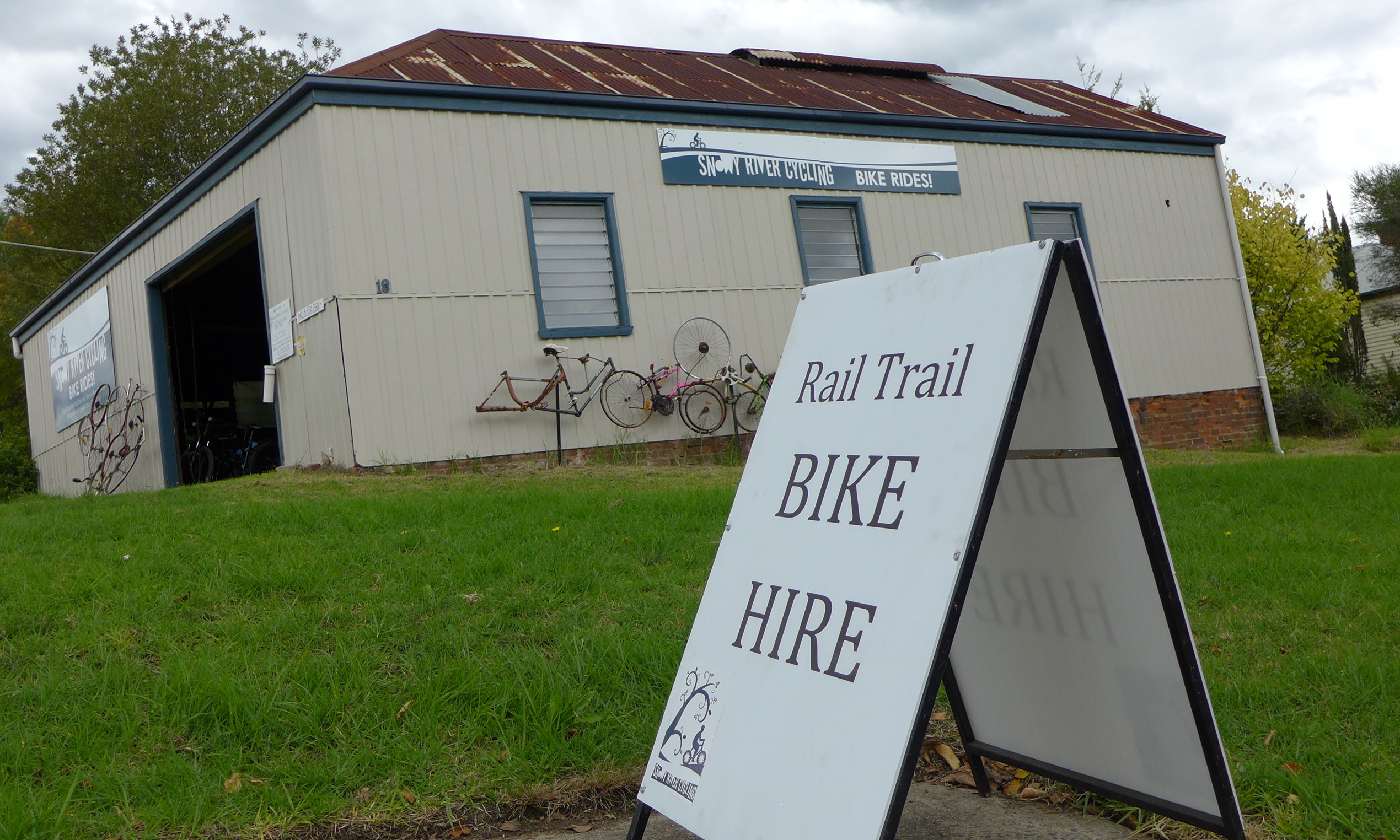
Snowy River cycling bike hire in Orbost.

Across the road from the end of the rail trail is an off-road shared pathway which was constructed in 2007/08 and which leads into Orbost, about another 2 km further on. The original Orbost terminus of the line was on the west bank of the Snowy River, with the train never actually crossing the river into Orbost itself. The shared pathway travels near this station site, but little remains of it. There is however a low level causeway over the river flats consisting of a series of timber and steel bridges called the Orbost Viaduct, which shows the original route of the railway, however there are no plans to reopen this as part of the rail trail.

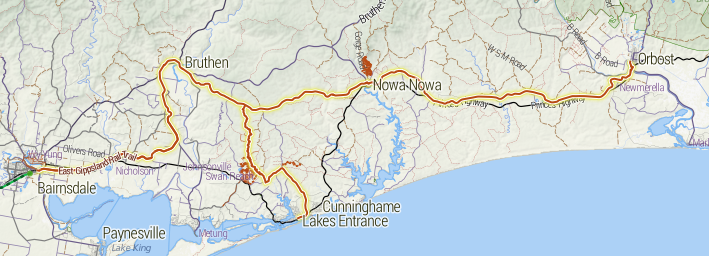
Map of the East Gippsland Rail Trail.
