= Nowa Nowa railway station =

Former railway station in Victoria, Australia

Coordinates: 37°43′45″S 148°05′39″E

Nowa Nowa

General information
- Line: Orbost
- Platforms: 1
- Tracks: 1

Other information
- Status: Closed

History
- Opened: 10 April 1916
- Closed: 24 August 1987

Services
Preceding station	Disused railways	Following station
Colquhoun	Orbost line	Tostaree
	List of closed railway stations in Victoria	
Location

Nowa Nowa railway station was located on the Orbost railway line. It opened on 10 April 1916 to serve the small town of the same name and was closed with the line in August 1987.

Nowa Nowa was disestablished as a staff station on 25 July 1986. The staff and ticket sections Bairnsdale - Bruthen, Bruthen - Nowa Nowa and Nowa Nowa - Orbost were abolished and replaced with a single staff and ticket section: Bairnsdale - Orbost.

The East Gippsland Rail Trail mostly follows the route of the former rail line. The station site, just north of the rail trail, is now an emergency helicopter landing place.
