= Colquhoun railway station =

Former railway station in Victoria, Australia

Coordinates: 37°44′35″S 148°2′34″E

Colquhoun

General information
- Line: Orbost
- Platforms: 1
- Tracks: 1

Other information
- Status: Closed

History
- Opened: 1916
- Closed: 1987

Services
Preceding station	Disused railways	Following station
Bruthen	Orbost line	Nowa Nowa
	List of closed railway stations in Victoria	
Location

Colquhoun railway station in Victoria, Australia was opened on 10 April 1916 as part of the Orbost railway line. The station has since closed, with the last train passing the site in 1987.

Little evidence remains of the former station site, however the site remains as part of the East Gippsland Rail Trail, which follows the route of the former rail line.

To the east of the former station site, about 4.5 km west of Nowa Nowa is the spectacular Stony Creek Trestle Bridge, built in the early 1900s and measuring 276m long and 19m high. While the bridge remains largely intact, including rails, for safety reasons due to its poor condition the bridge itself is fenced off, and the rail trail deviates down and across the Stony Creek valley beside the bridge. A carpark, toilet and picnic facilities are available at this location.

== Gallery ==
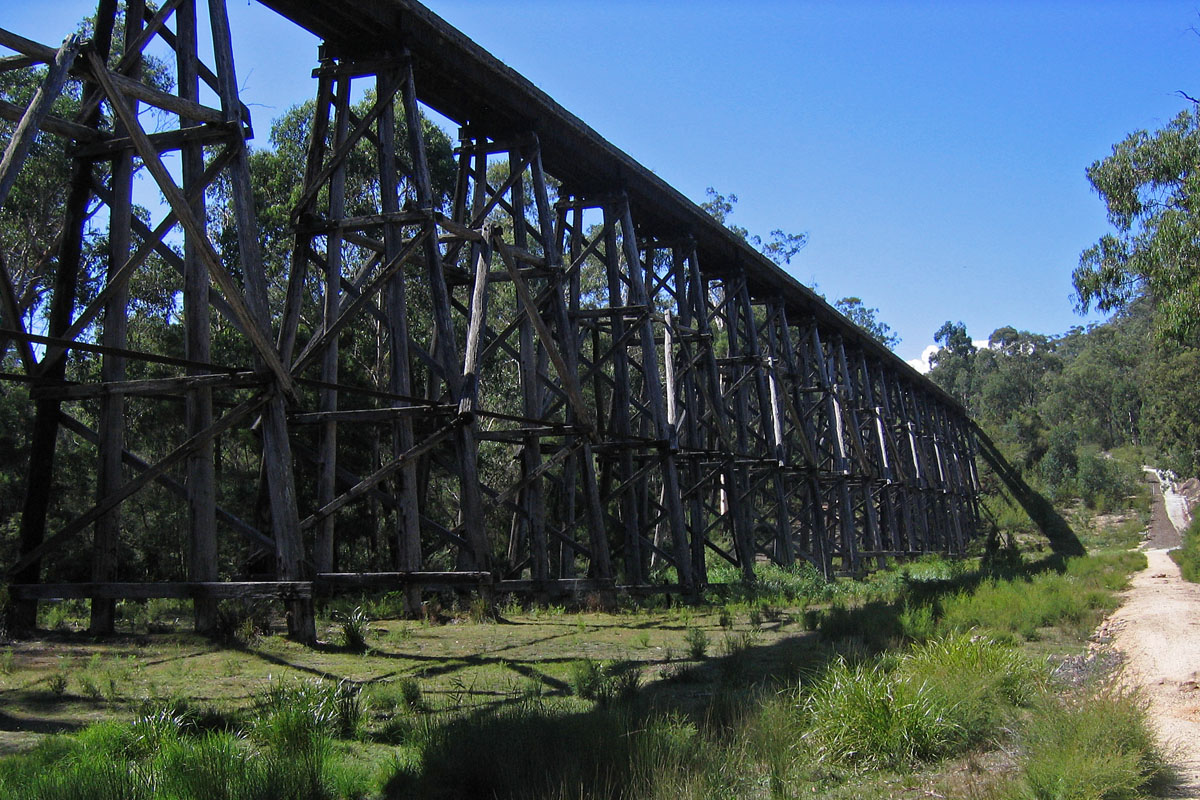
Stony Creek trestle looking east from below bridge

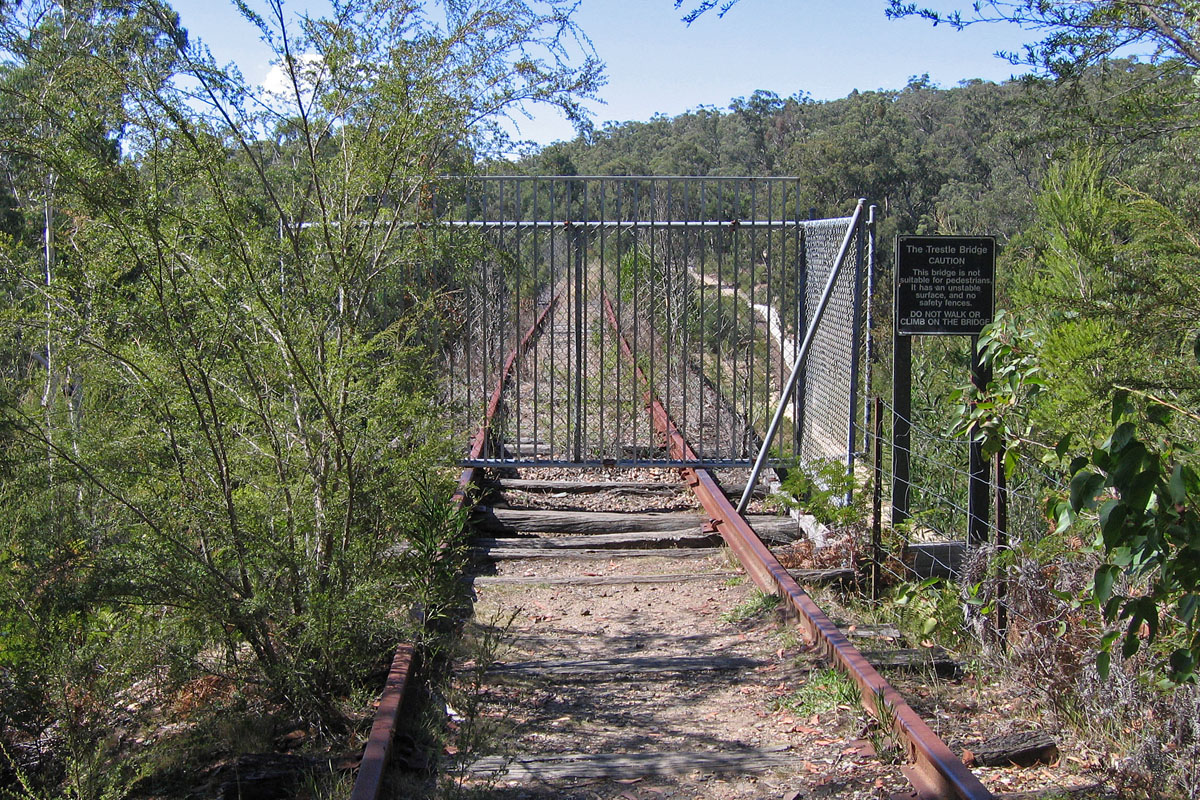
Stony Creek Trestle Bridge looking east along the bridge deck
