= Nicholson, Victoria =

Nicholson
- Town
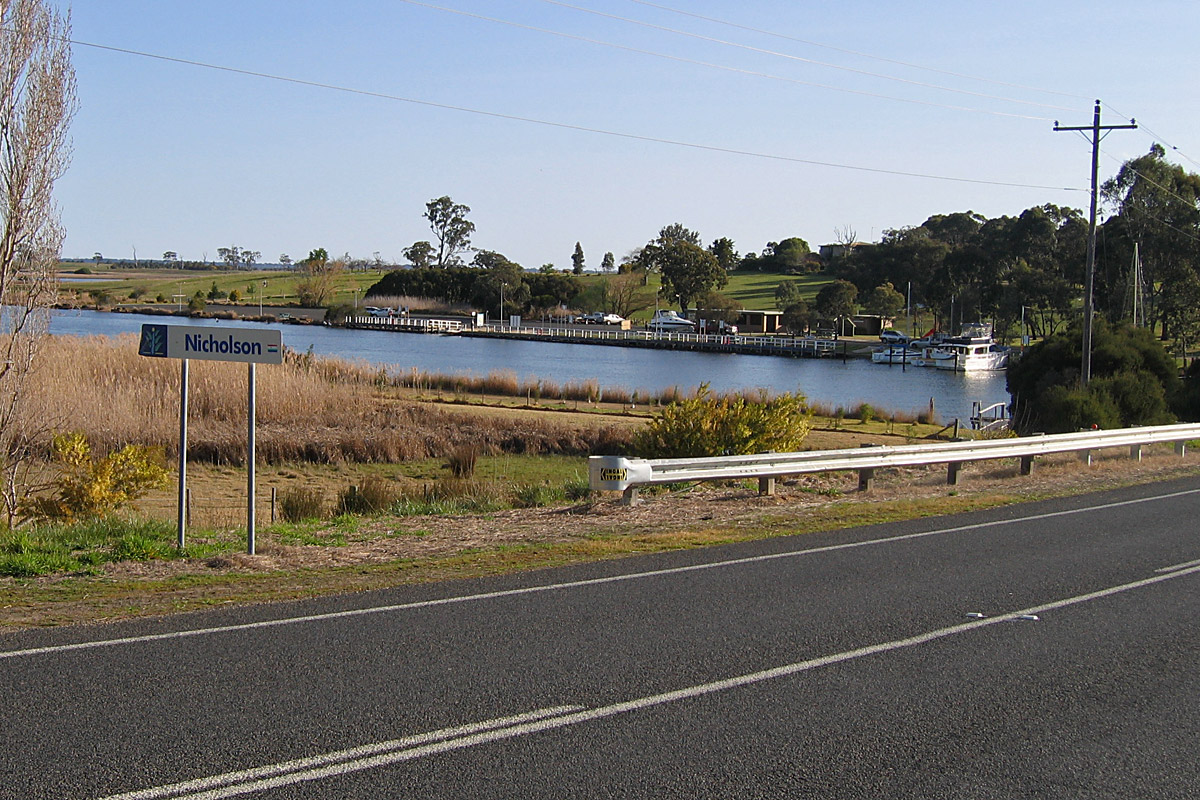
- Eastern entry to town looking across the Nicholson River to the boat ramp

- Coordinates: 37°49′0″S 147°44′0″E
- Country: Australia
- State: Victoria
- LGA: Shire of East Gippsland
- Location: 295 km (183 mi) E of Melbourne; 13 km (8.1 mi) E of Bairnsdale; 24 km (15 mi) W of Lakes Entrance

Government
  - State electorate: Gippsland East
  - Federal division: Gippsland

Population
  - Total: 1,322 (2021 census)
- Postcode: 3882

Nicholson is a town in East Gippsland, Victoria, Australia, 295 km east of the state capital Melbourne. It is situated between the larger towns of Bairnsdale and Lakes Entrance. At the 2021 census, Nicholson had a population of 1,322.

Nicholson is located on the Princes Highway and lies on the banks of the Nicholson River.

Nicholson Post Office opened on 1 August 1885.

The town has a substantial boat ramp on the west bank of the river, to the south of the highway, where picnic, toilet, and barbecue facilities are also available.

The East Gippsland Rail Trail passes across the north section of the town, with the site of the former Nicholson railway station identified by a sign.

== Gallery ==
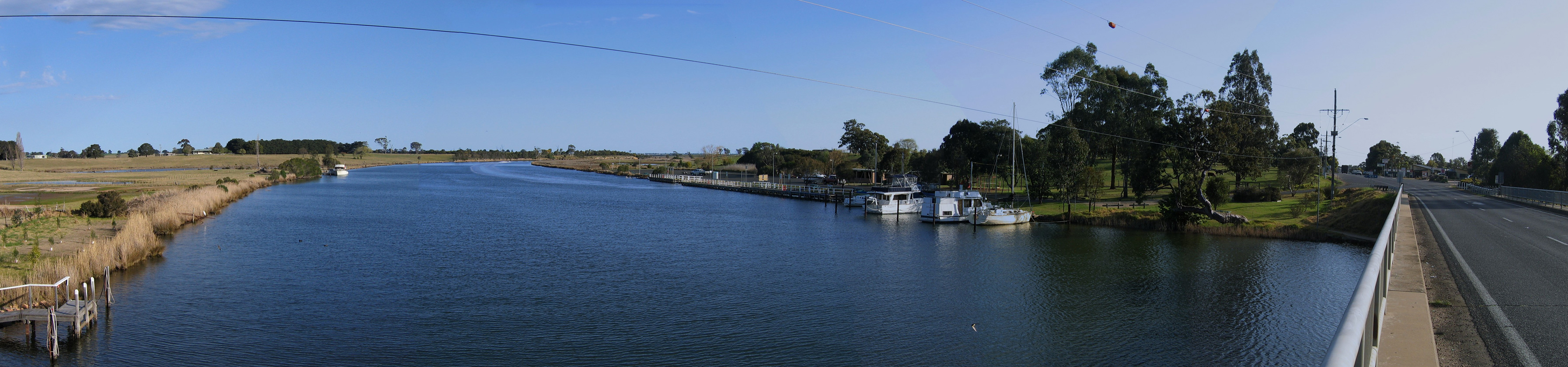
Looking south along the Nicholson River, with the boat ramp and Princes Highway to the right

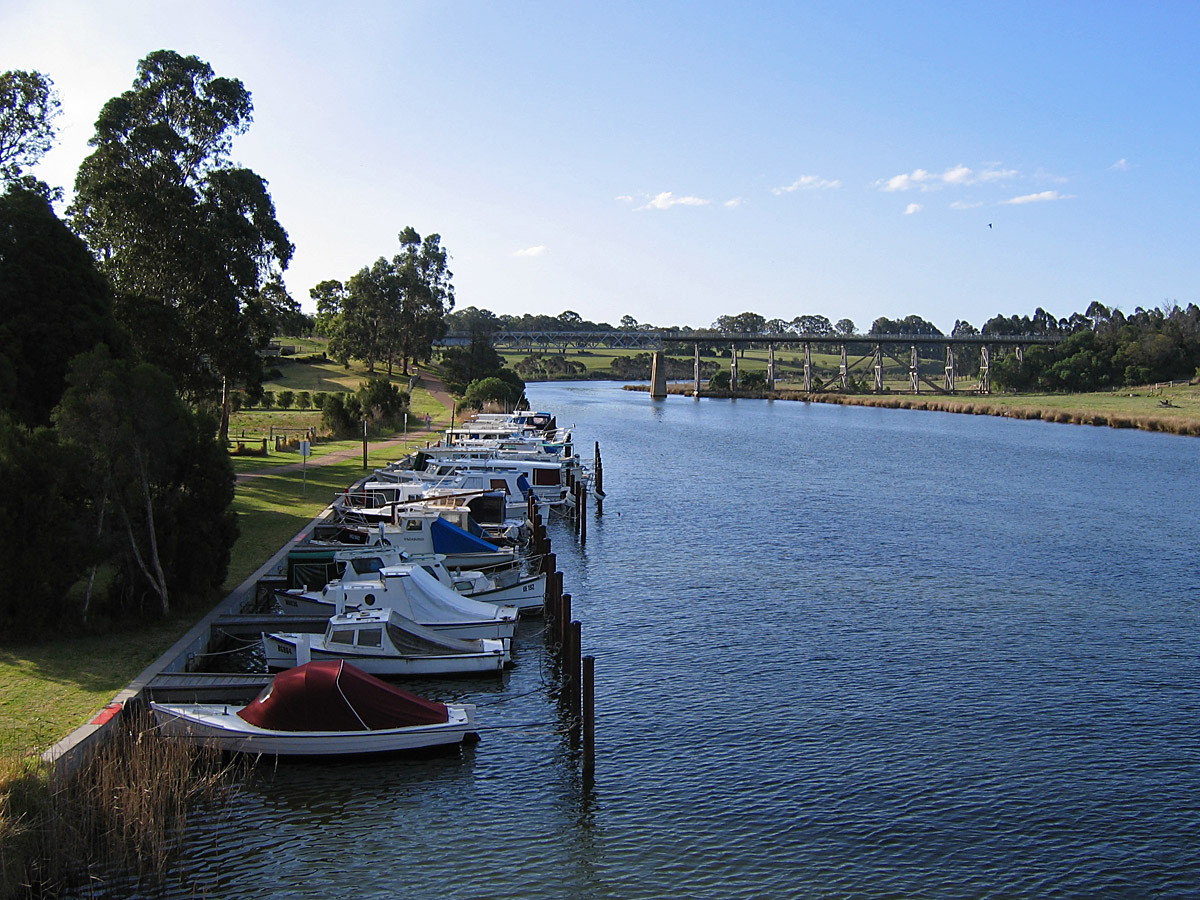
Looking north to the East Gippsland Rail Trail trestle bridge across the river

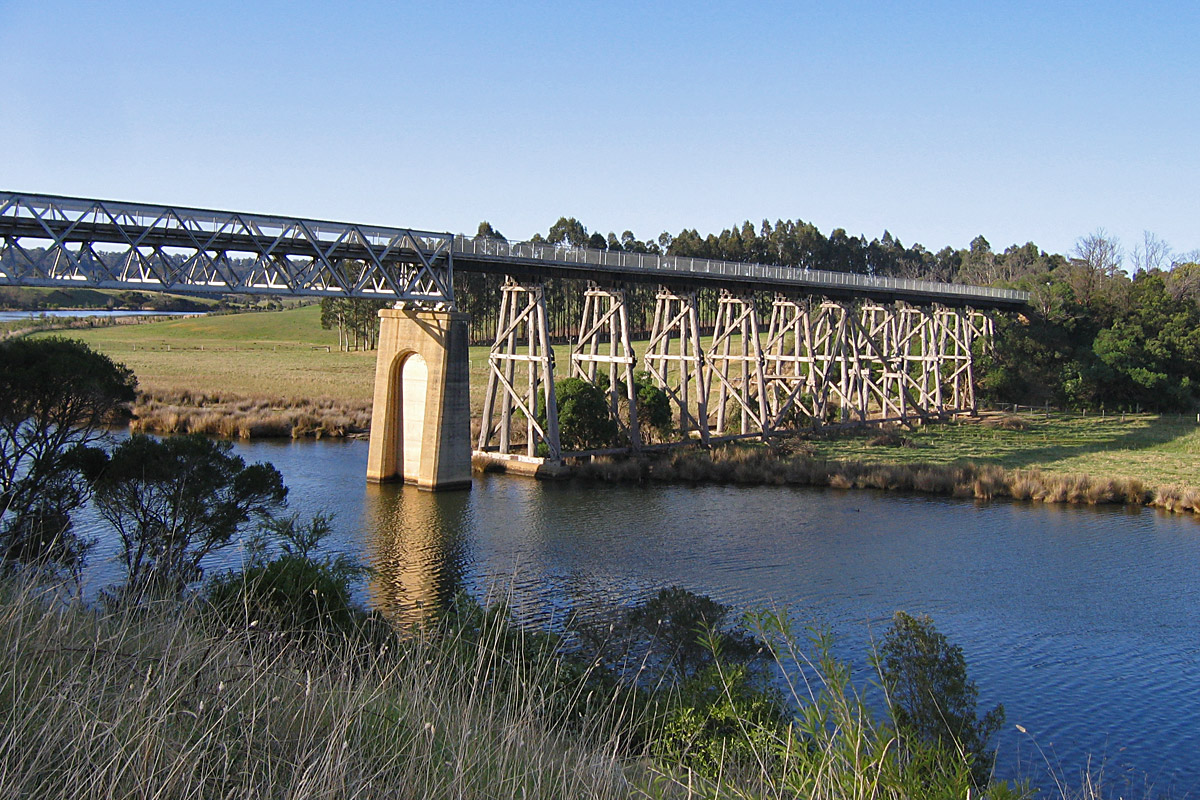
The East Gippsland Rail Trail former railway trestle bridge over the Nicholson River

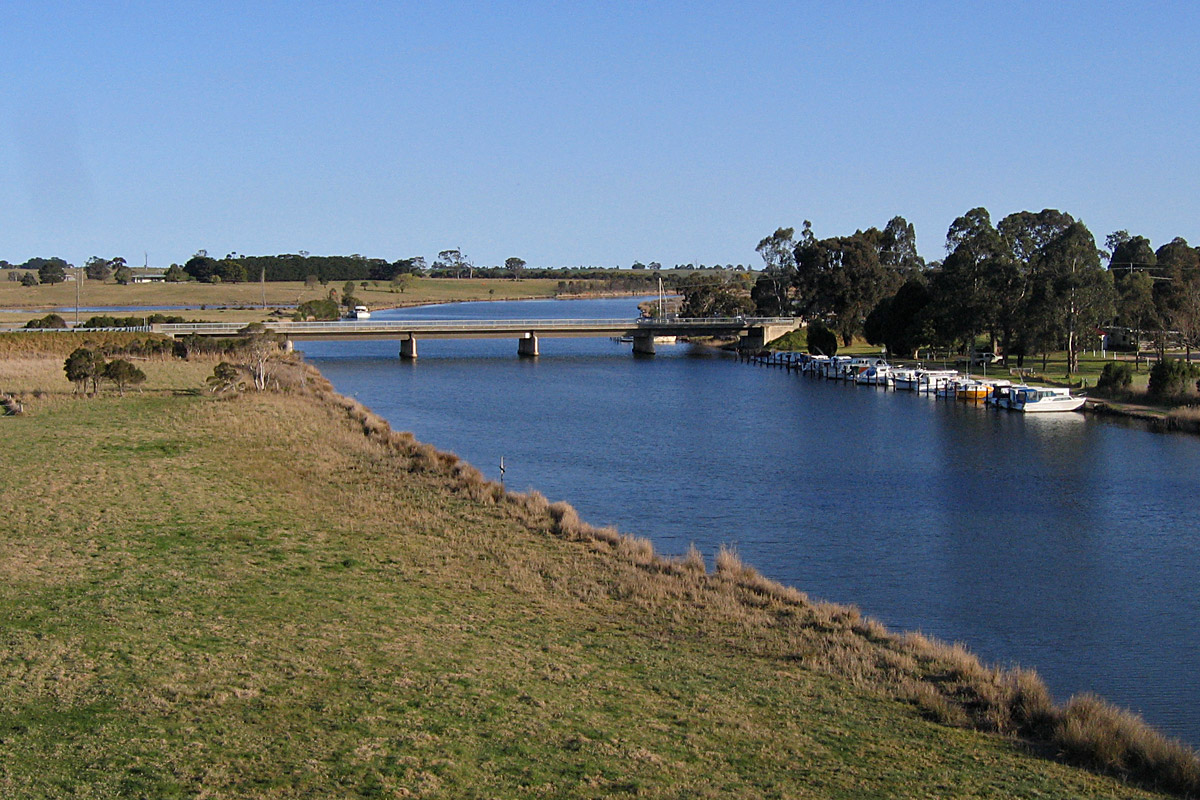
Looking south down the Nicholson River towards the Princes Highway road bridge from the East Gippsland Rail Trail
