= Bruthen railway station =

Former railway station in Victoria, Australia

Bruthen

General information
- Coordinates: 37°42′21″S 147°49′18″E
- Line: Orbost
- Platforms: 1
- Tracks: 1

Other information
- Status: Closed

History
- Opened: 1916
- Closed: 1987

Services
Preceding station	Disused railways	Following station
Mossiface	Orbost line	Colquhoun
	List of closed railway stations in Victoria	
Location

Bruthen railway station was opened on 10 April 1916, as part of the Orbost railway line. The station officially closed on 24 August 1987.

The former platform remains evident at the station site, with the site remaining as part of the East Gippsland Rail Trail, which follows the route of the former rail line. The station itself is slightly to the West of the town of Bruthen. In town, the railway alignment and rail trail pass through a short tunnel below the main street, and then skirt around the southern edge of Bruthen, crossing the large Storer Bridge, and over the Tambo River, which is now sealed with boards as the rail trail surface.

It was dis-established as a staff station on 25 July 1986, with the staff and ticket sections Bairnsdale - Bruthen, Bruthen - Nowa Nowa, and Nowa Nowa - Orbost abolished, and replaced with a single staff and ticket section; Bairnsdale - Orbost.
