= Bumberrah railway station =

Former railway station in Victoria, Australia

Coordinates: 37°47′35.88″S 147°49′43.68″E

Bumberrah
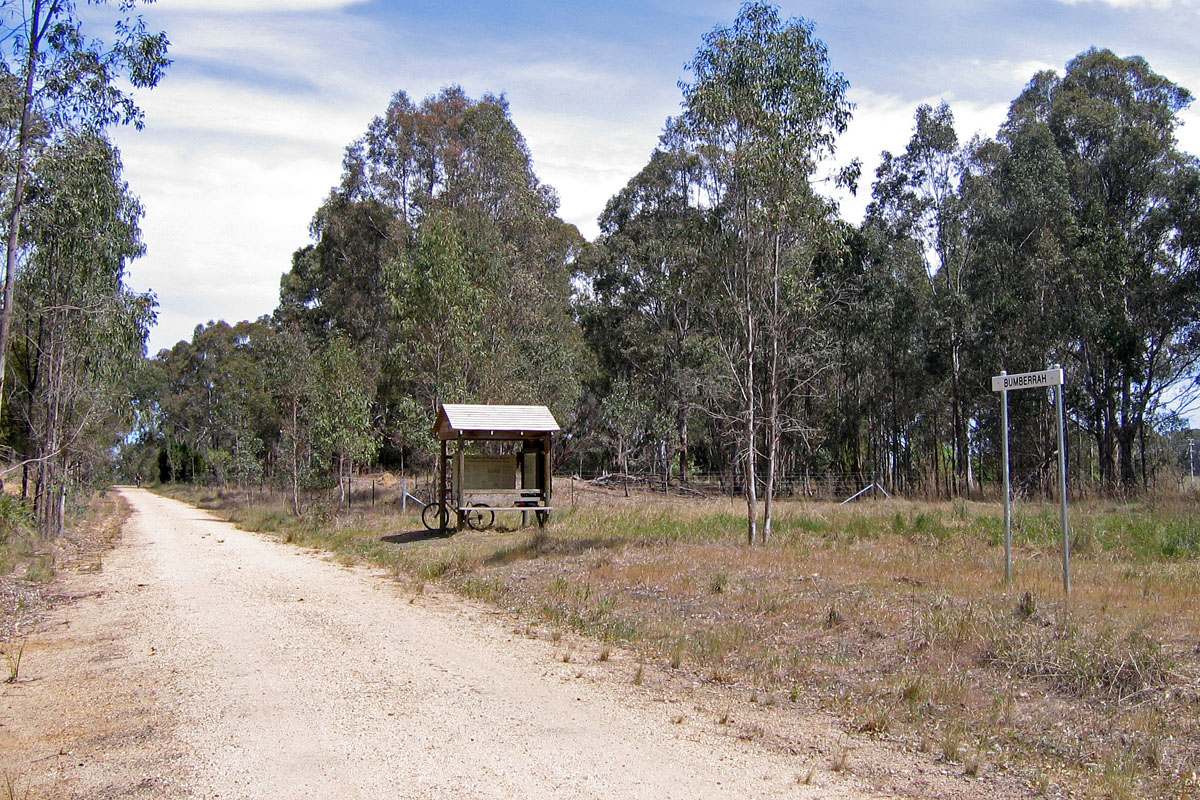
- The former station site at Bumberrah, looking south

General information
- Line: Orbost
- Platforms: 1
- Tracks: 1

Other information
- Status: Closed

History
- Opened: 1916
- Closed: 1977

Services
Preceding station	Disused railways	Following station
Nicholson	Orbost line	Mossiface
	List of closed railway stations in Victoria	
Location

Bumberrah railway station and siding was opened on 10 April 1916 as part of the Orbost railway line. The station was closed in 1977, with the last train passing the site in 1987.

The former station grounds have been preserved, with a diversity of native flora on the site remaining as a result of it being protected from grazing stock during its time in use by the railways.

As part of the East Gippsland Rail Trail, which follows the route of the former rail line, a new station name board has been erected at the site, along with a rest shelter and information board in a remnant grassy woodland reserve.

== Gallery ==
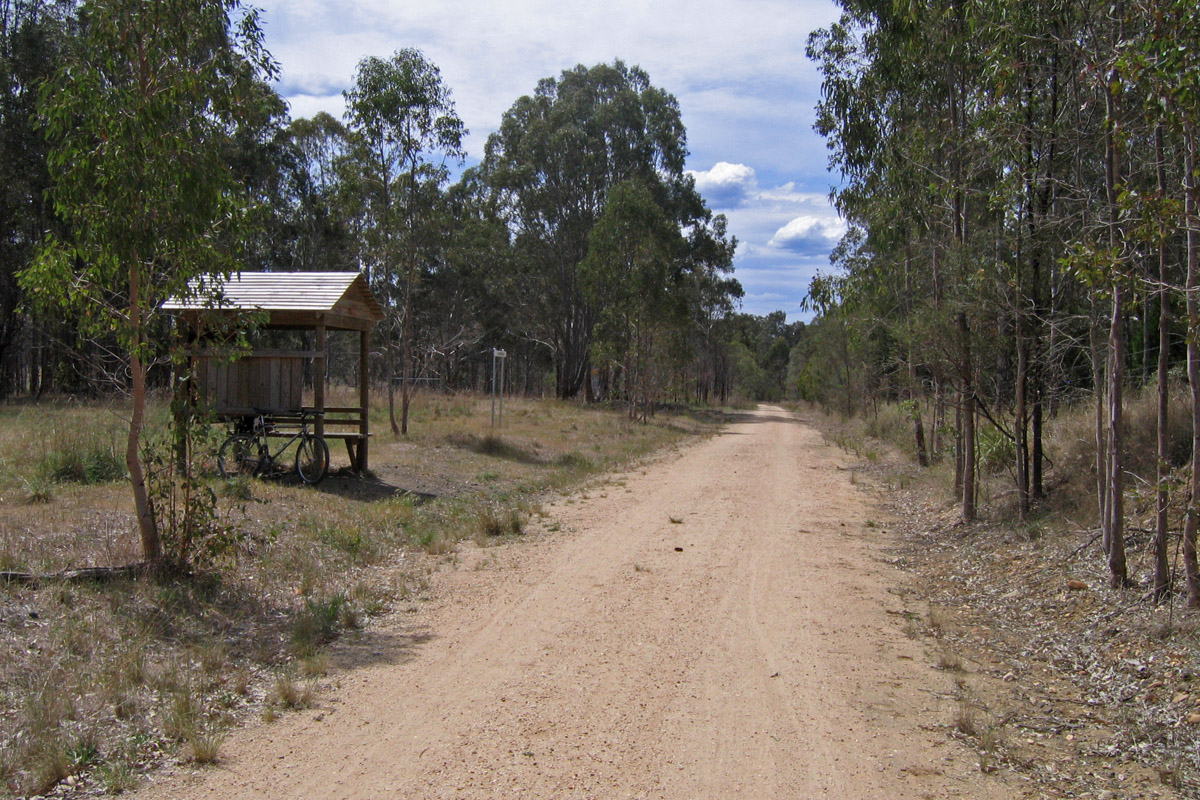
Looking north from the former station site
