= Tostaree railway station =

Former railway station in Victoria, Australia

Coordinates: 37°44′53″S 148°10′45″E

Tostaree

General information
- Line: Orbost
- Platforms: 1
- Tracks: 1

Other information
- Status: Closed

History
- Opened: 1916
- Closed: 1987

Services
Preceding station	Disused railways	Following station
Nowa Nowa	Orbost line	Waygara
	List of closed railway stations in Victoria	
Location

Tostaree railway station was opened on 10 April 1916 as part of the Orbost railway line. The station has since closed, with the last train passing the site in 1987.

Little evidence remains of the former station site other than tracks across the roadway, however the site remains as part of the East Gippsland Rail Trail, which follows the route of the former rail line.
