= Waygara railway station =

Former railway station in Victoria, Australia

Coordinates: 37°44′26″S 148°19′01″E

Waygara

General information
- Line: Orbost
- Platforms: 1
- Tracks: 1

Other information
- Status: Closed

History
- Opened: 1916
- Closed: 1987

Services
Preceding station	Disused railways	Following station
Tostaree	Orbost line	Orbost
	List of closed railway stations in Victoria	
Location

Waygara railway station was opened on 10 April 1916 as part of the Orbost railway line. The station has since closed, with the last train passing the site in 1987.

Little evidence remains of the former station site, however the site remains as part of the East Gippsland Rail Trail, which follows the route of the former rail line.
