= Nicholson River (Victoria) =

River in Victoria, Australia

Nicholson
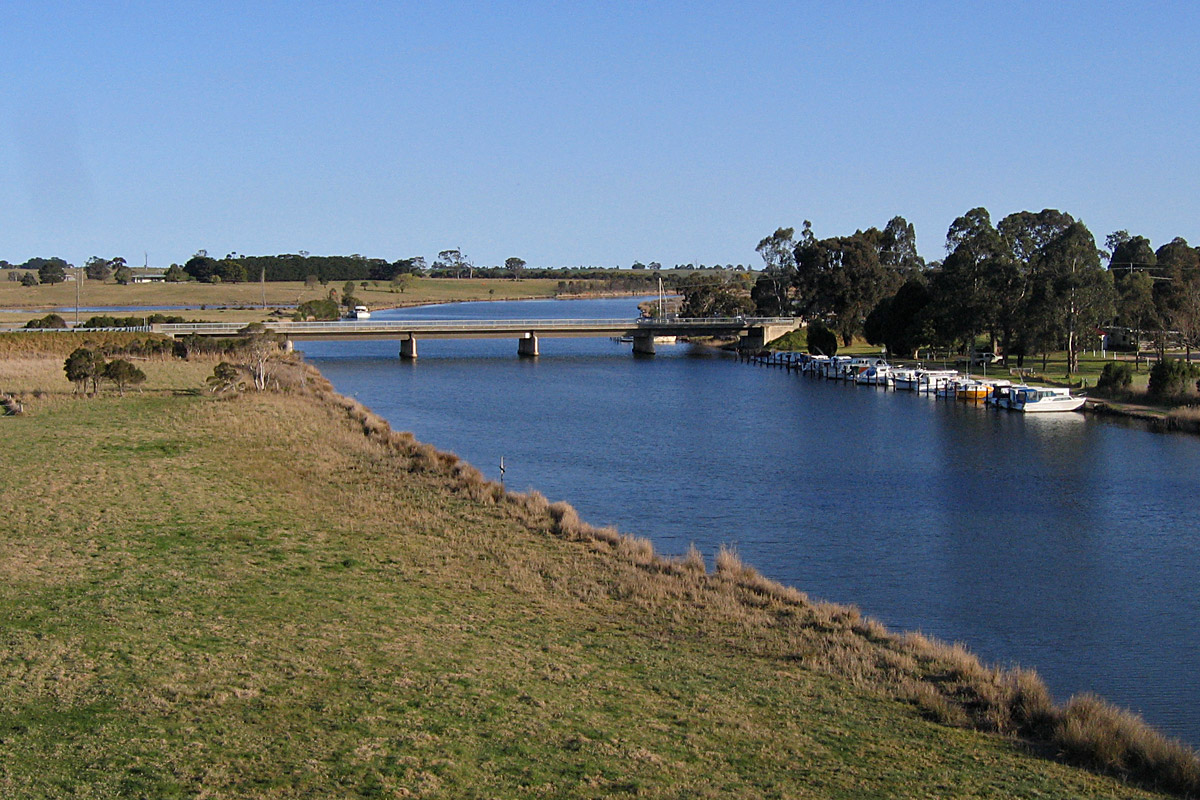
- Looking south along the river from the East Gippsland Rail Trail trestle bridge at Nicholson.

- Location of the Nicholson River mouth in Victoria
- Etymology: In honour of Charles Nicholson
- Native name: Yowen-burrun (Brabralung); Dart'yung (Brabralung); Geremoot (Brabralung); Ngarrak walang (Tatungalung)

Location
- Country: Australia
- State: Victoria
- Region: South East Corner (IBRA), East Gippsland
- Local government area: Shire of East Gippsland
- Towns: Nicholson

Physical characteristics
- Source: Angora Range, Great Dividing Range
  - location: below Marthavale
  - coordinates: 37°26′43″S 147°31′24″E
  - elevation: 440 m (1,440 ft)
- Mouth: Lake King to form confluence with the Mitchell River
  - location: near Nicholson
  - coordinates: 37°50′53″S 147°43′54″E
  - elevation: 0 m (0 ft)
- Length: 83 km (52 mi)

Basin features
- River system: Mitchell River catchment
- Tributaries
  - left: Barmouth Creek, Navigation Creek, Nicholson Creek
  - right: Black Snake Creek, Yahoo Creek, Store Creek

The Nicholson River is a perennial river of the Mitchell River catchment, in the East Gippsland region of the Australian state of Victoria.

== Course and features ==
The Nicholson River rises below the Angora Range in the lower reaches of the Victorian Alps within the Great Dividing Range, near the small settlement of Marthavale, west of Ensay. The river flows generally southeast passing through the small town of Nicholson before entering Lake King, one of the main lakes in the extensive Gippsland Lakes system. Within the lake, the Nicholson River forms its confluence with the Mitchell River, which joins with the Tambo River; with the Mitchell River draining into Bass Strait southwest of Lakes Entrance, in the Shire of East Gippsland. The river descends 440 metres (1,440 ft) over its 83-kilometre (52 mi) course.

The river is impounded by the Nicholson River Dam, that forms a water reservoir used for the supply of town water to Lakes Entrance, until 1995.

In its lower reaches, the river is traversed by the Great Alpine Road, the Princes Highway, and the East Gippsland Rail Trail, a shared purpose rail trail that was formerly the part of the Orbost railway line.

== Etymology ==
There are a number of Australian Aboriginal names for the river including: from the Brabralung language Yowen-burrun and Dart'yung, both meaning "root of water plant"; Geremoot, with no clearly defined meaning; and in the Tatungalung language, Ngarrak walang, meaning "back-stone".

The current name of the river was given by the early colonial explorer and pastoralist, Angus McMillan, who named the river in 1839 in honour of Charles Nicholson, who represented the Port Phillip District on the NSW Legislative Council and was later Colonial Secretary.

== See also ==
- Haughtons Flat Diversion Tunnel
- List of rivers of Australia

== Gallery ==
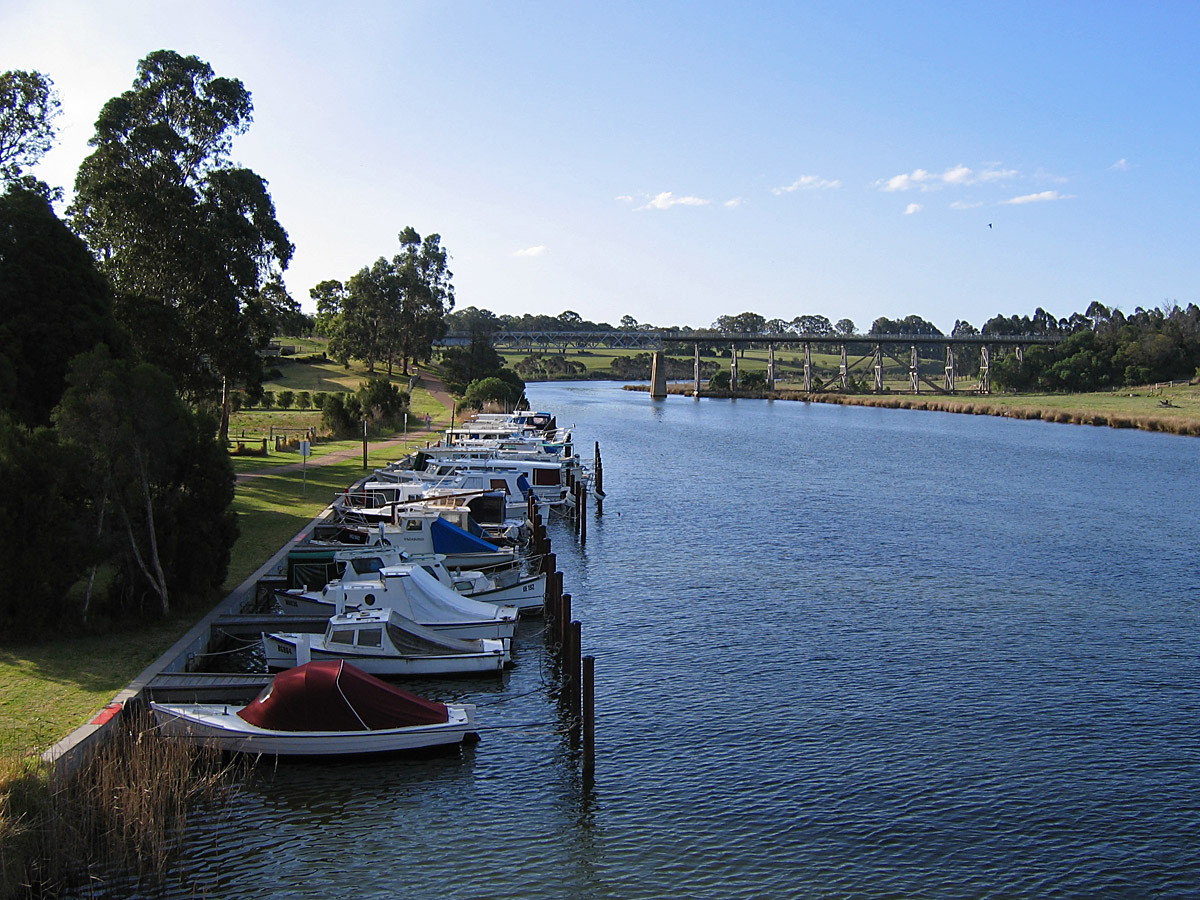
Looking north to the rail trail trestle bridge across the river at Nicholson
