= Mossiface railway station =

Former railway station in Victoria, Australia

Coordinates: 37°44′1.6842″S 147°48′37.08″E

Mossiface
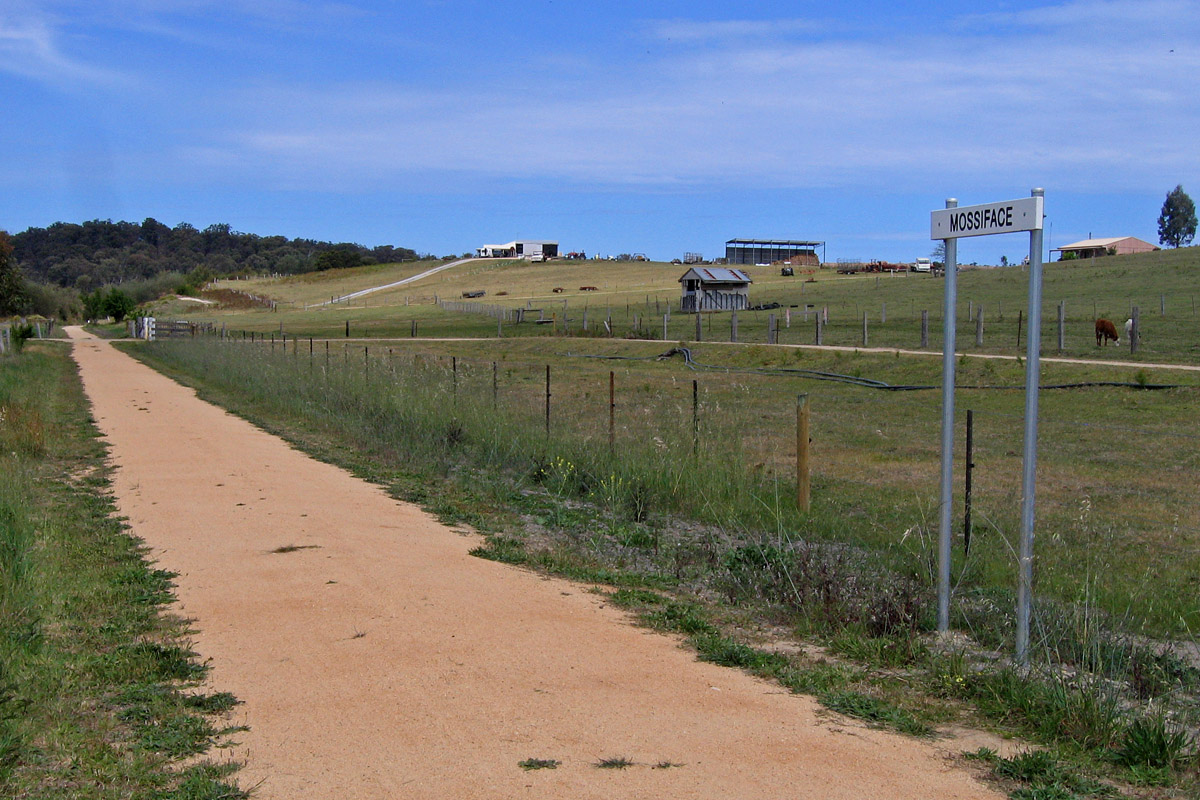
- The former station site at Mossiface, looking south

General information
- Line: Orbost
- Platforms: 1
- Tracks: 1

Other information
- Status: Closed

History
- Opened: 1916
- Closed: 1987

Services
Preceding station	Disused railways	Following station
Bumberrah	Orbost line	Bruthen
	List of closed railway stations in Victoria	
Location

Mossiface railway station and siding was opened on Monday 10 April 1916 as part of the Orbost railway line. The station has long since closed, with the last train passing the site in 1987.

The former station grounds have been preserved, and are surrounded by the small Mossiface township consisting of a few houses, farms, and facilities, including some historic hop kilns. The site overlooks the Tambo River flats, which are used as productive grazing farmland.

A station name board exists at the site as part of the East Gippsland Rail Trail, which follows the route of the former rail line.

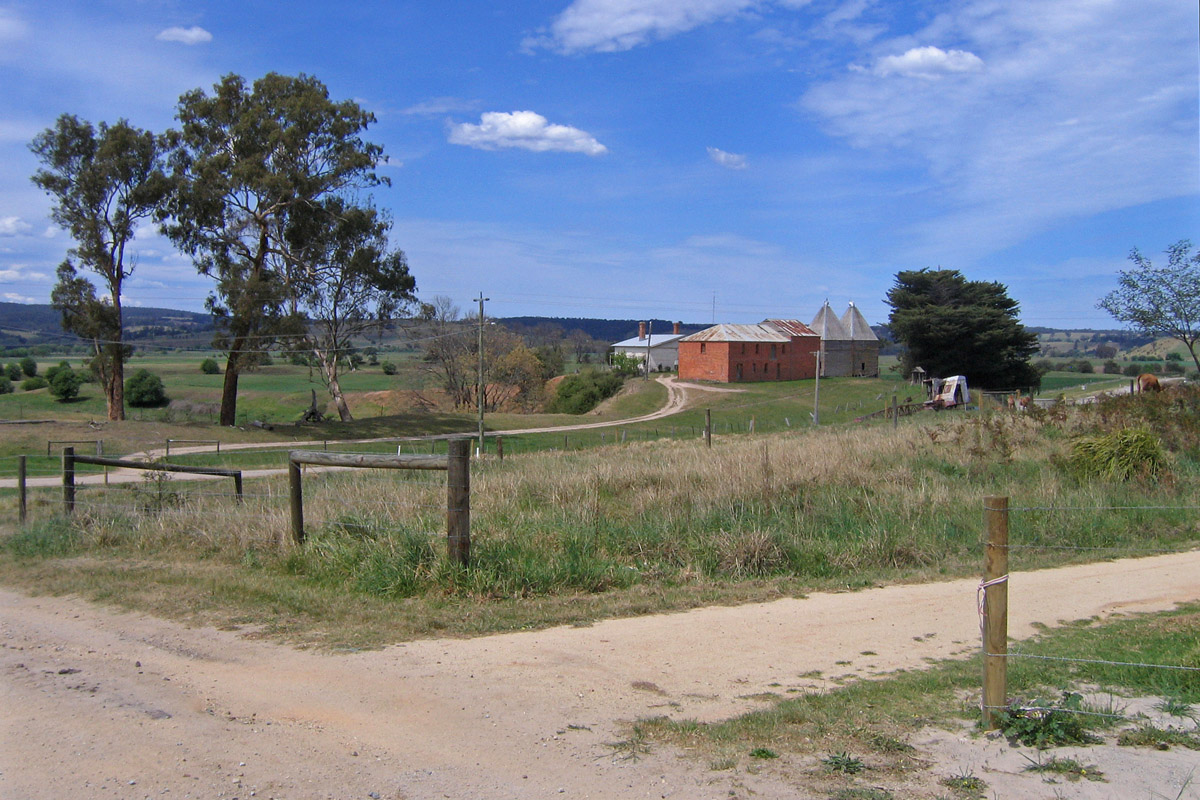
View from former railway line of historic hop kilns and Tambo River flats
