= Gippsland Lakes Discovery Trail =

Rail trail in Victoria, Australia

Coordinates: 37.777°S 147.926°E

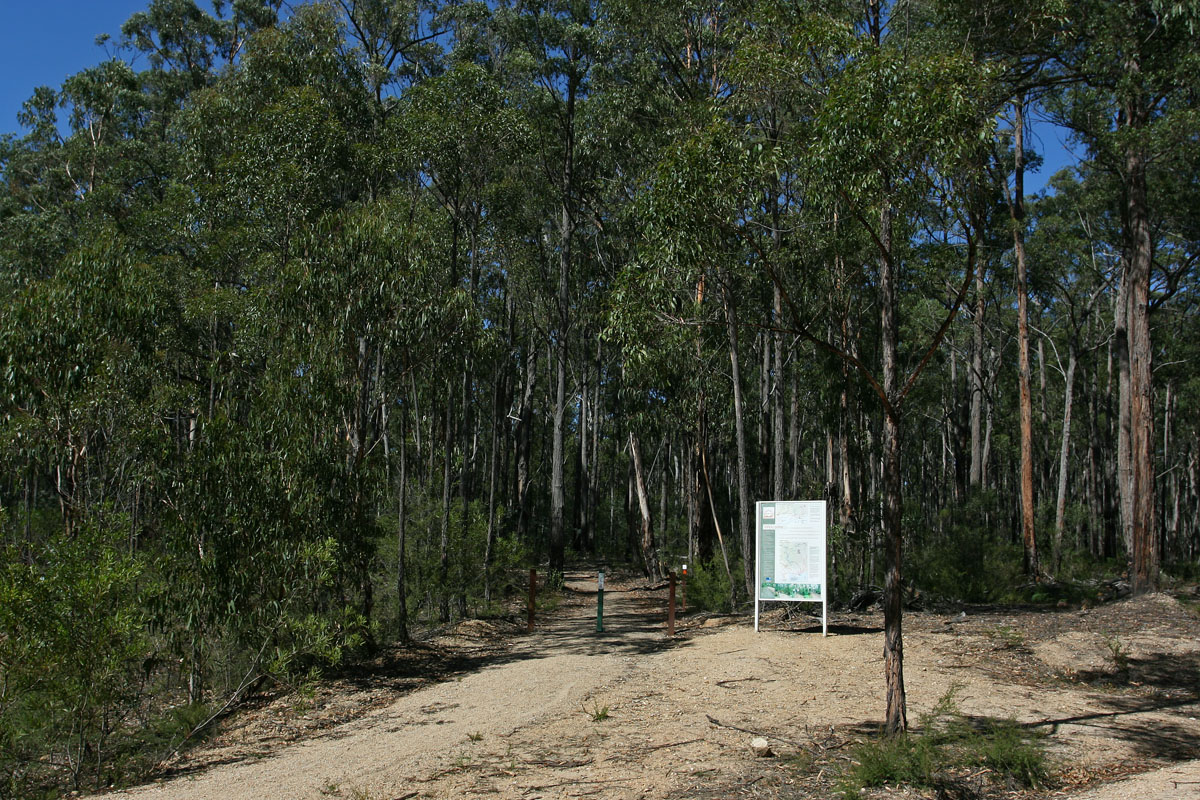
- The start of the Gippsland Lakes Discovery Trail in the Colquhoun State Forest
- Length: 25 km
- Location: Melbourne, Victoria, Australia
- Difficulty: Medium
- Hazards: Steep rough hills, isolated locations, uncontrolled road crossings, irregular maintenance
- Surface: Crushed granite, smooth gravel
- Hills: Some very steep grades in parts, undulating hills
- Water: Available in towns
- Trains: None directly connect to route; nearest is Bairnsdale line
- Bus: Available in Lakes Entrance

The Gippsland Lakes Discovery Trail is a 25 km rail trail in East Gippsland, Victoria, Australia, sometimes known as the Mississippi Creek Trail.

It connects the East Gippsland Rail Trail to Lakes Entrance, much of it running through the Colquhoun State Forest. It follows the route of a former tramway used to transport granite from a quarry to Lakes Entrance.

Work to build the trail was initiated in 2000 as part of a statewide Government program to expand the rail trail network, and it was fully completed in 2003. Its surface is gravel and crushed granite. Some sections of the trail are suitable only for mountain bikes or sturdy hybrid bikes.

== Route description ==
=== East Gippsland Rail Trail to Granite Quarry (5 km) ===
The trail commences at a junction with the East Gippsland Rail Trail beside Seaton Track in the Colquhoun State Forest. The Discovery Trail heads south on a narrow path through the eucalyptus forest, while the Rail Trail travels east–west on a wide clearing following the route of the former Orbost railway line.

The trail initially travels close to the route of Seaton Track, but their routes soon diverge and the trail continues south through isolated bush. The track surface is coarse stony gravel in this section, much of it formed from crushed granite from the quarry. Parts of the trail in this section are narrow, with some very steep grades, and should be approached with care.

After 4 km the trail descends steeply to Quarry Road and travels beside this for a short distance, before offering a detour to the granite quarry near Mississippi Creek. This quarry is now abandoned, but operated during the first half of the twentieth century originally to provide granite used to build a permanent entrance to the Gippsland Lakes. This was to be a replacement for the timber pylons that had been used in the original construction of an entrance, but which had suffered much damage due to the marine toledo worm. There is a small viewing area and rest stop at the quarry.

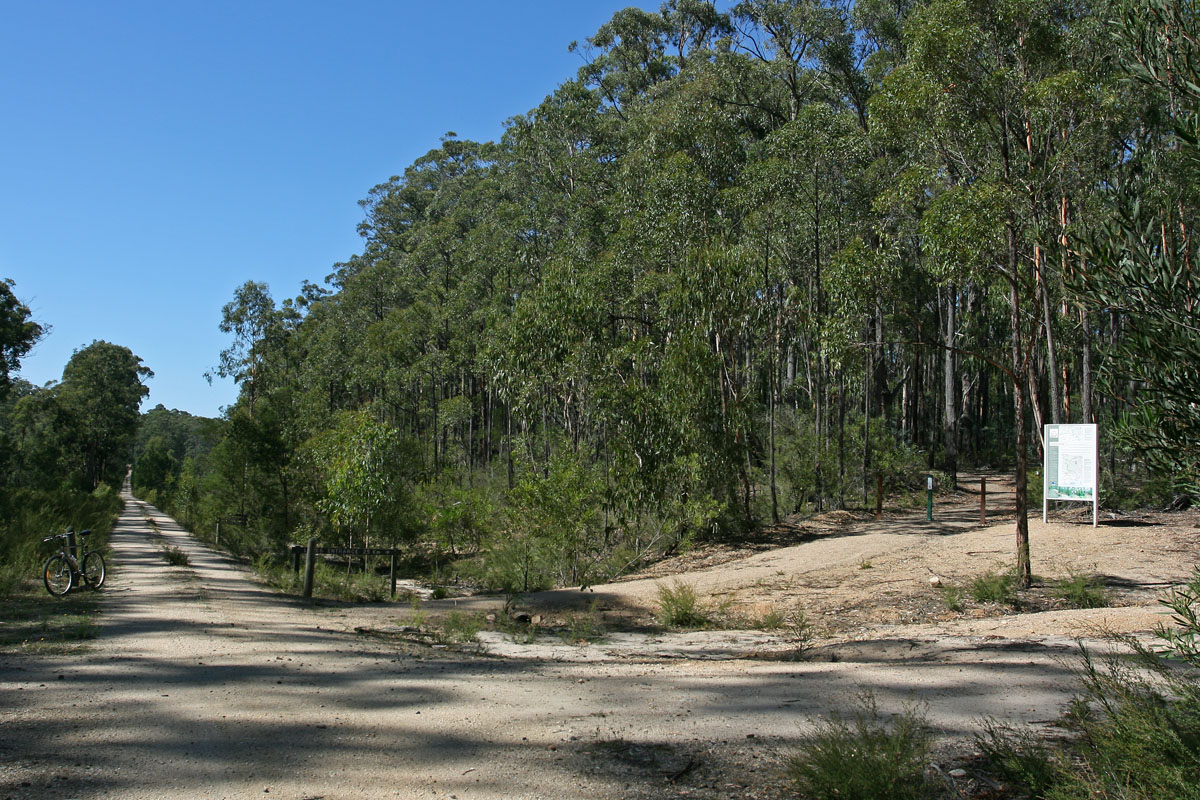
The junction with the East Gippsland Rail Trail in the Colquhoun State Forest

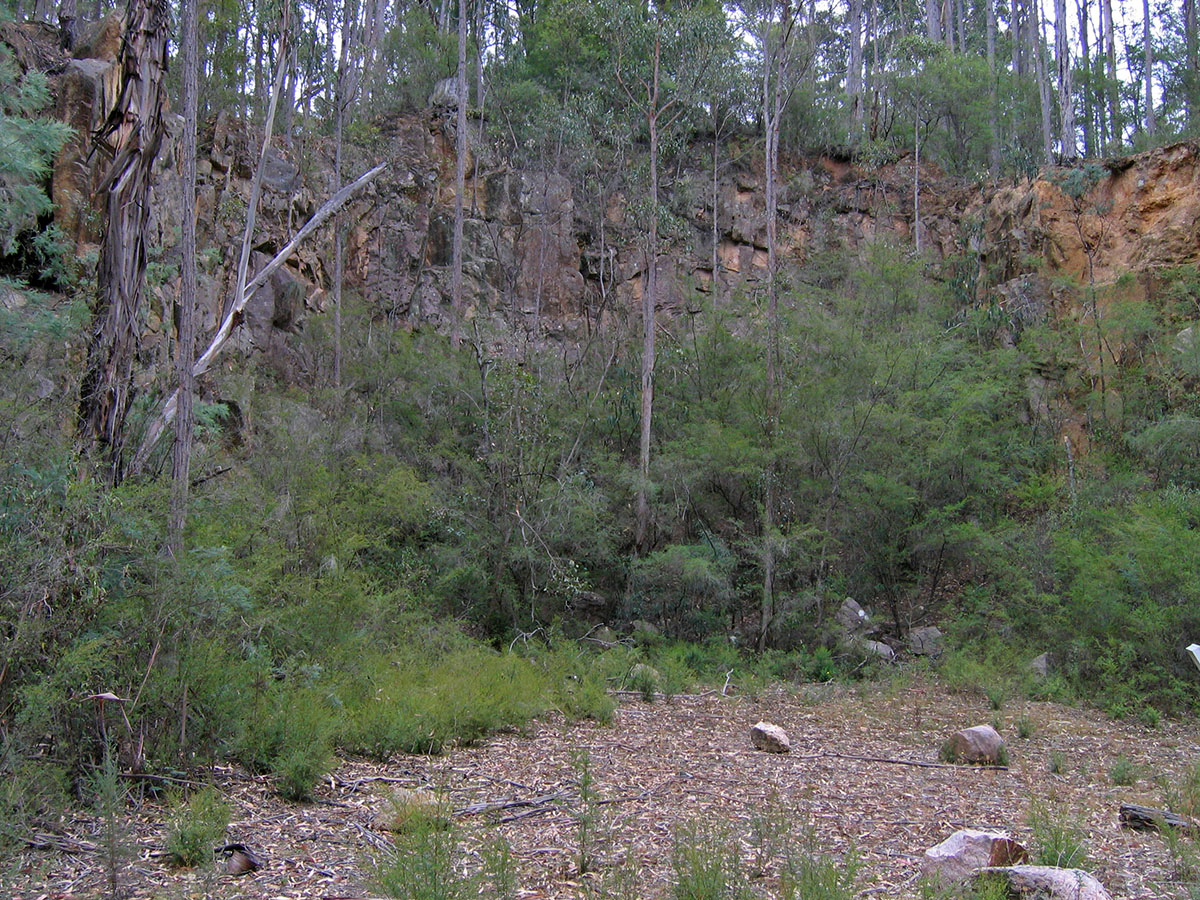
This granite quarry was the reason for the construction of the original tramway

=== Granite Quarry to Log Crossing Picnic Area (Forestech) (7 km) ===
The main trail must be rejoined following the same short detour used to access the quarry. The trail in this section follows the route of the original Mississippi Creek Tramway which was constructed in the early 1900s and used until the 1930s to transport granite from the quarry to Lakes Entrance. This tramway closely followed the path of Mississippi Creek, and the Discovery Trail therefore takes the same route.

The trail continues for 7 km before crossing Log Crossing Rd, where the Log Crossing Picnic Area provides a rest stop, including toilets and parking. The Forestech campus of the East Gippsland Institute of TAFE on the Princes Highway is approximately 2 km away from this point, and can be reached either via a narrow walking/cycling track, or via Log Crossing Rd.

=== Log Crossing Picnic Area to Lakes Entrance (13 km) ===
The trail continues south-south-east from the Log Crossing Picnic Area for 2 km until it meets Scrivener Rd; a parking bay is available at this location. The trail diverges from Mississippi Creek at this point, and trail users must travel about 100m east along Scrivener Rd before the trail recommences on the opposite side of the road at the foot of a steep hill.

The track travels alongside Scrivener Rd for 3 km, gradually turning north-east. Where Scrivener Rd meets the Lakes-Colquhoun Rd the track again turns south-south-east and travels along Lakes-Colquhoun Rd for about 5 km of generally flat to undulating road, before a final 3 km descent into Lakes Entrance. A very rough track is available beside the road for part of this route, but cyclists in particular are best advised to take the road itself. The Lakes-Colquhoun Rd joins the Princes Highway at the eastern end of the main Lakes Entrance shopping strip.

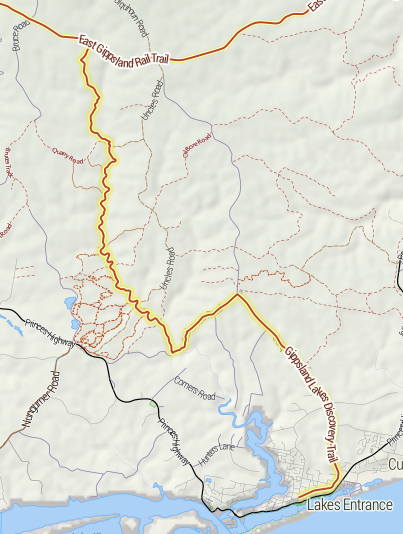
Map of the Gippsland Lakes Discovery Trail.
