= Nicholson railway station =

Former railway station in Victoria, Australia

Coordinates: 37°48′49.6844″S 147°44′11.76″E

Nicholson

General information
- Line: Orbost
- Platforms: 1
- Tracks: 1

Other information
- Status: Closed

History
- Opened: 1916
- Closed: 1987

Services
Preceding station	Disused railways	Following station
Bairnsdale	Orbost line	Bumberrah
	List of closed railway stations in Victoria	
Location

Nicholson railway station was opened on 10 April 1916 as part of the Orbost railway line and closed on 24 August 1987.

Little trace remains of the station site, however a station name board exists at the site as part of the East Gippsland Rail Trail, which follows the route of the former rail line.

== Gallery ==
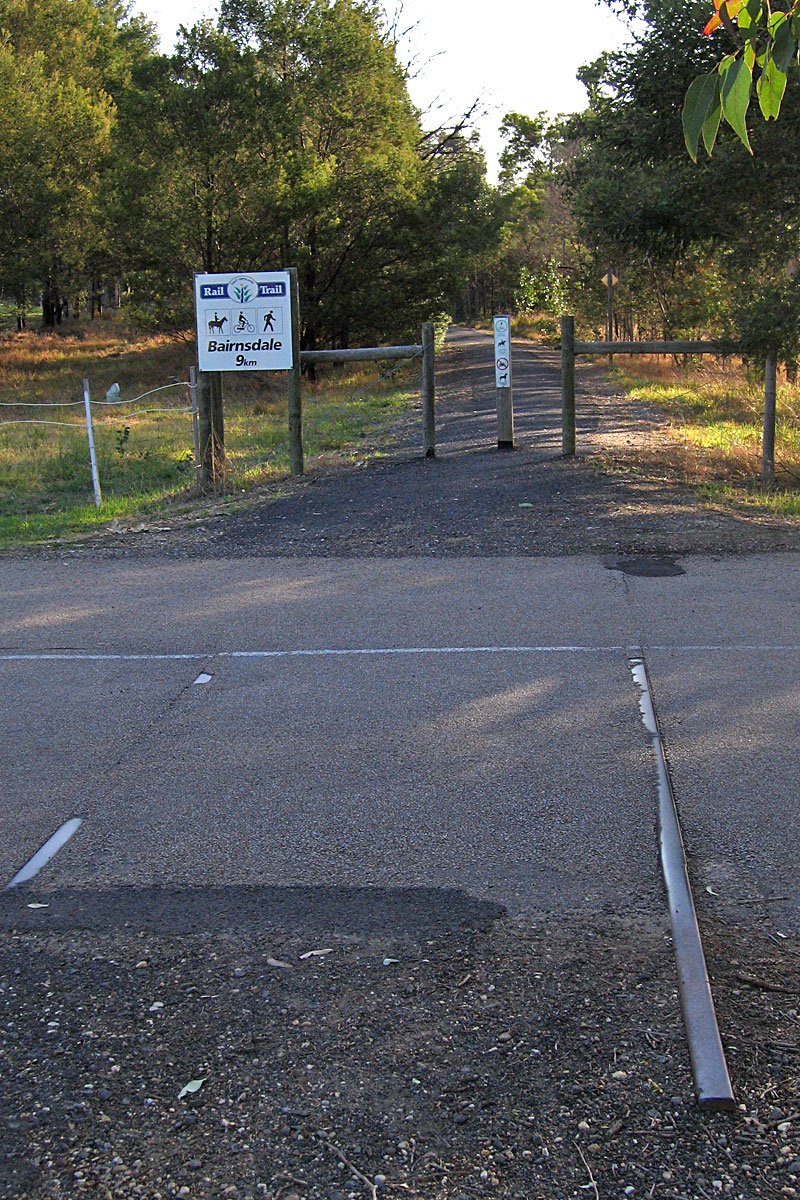
The railway crossing on the Nicholson-Sarsfield Road

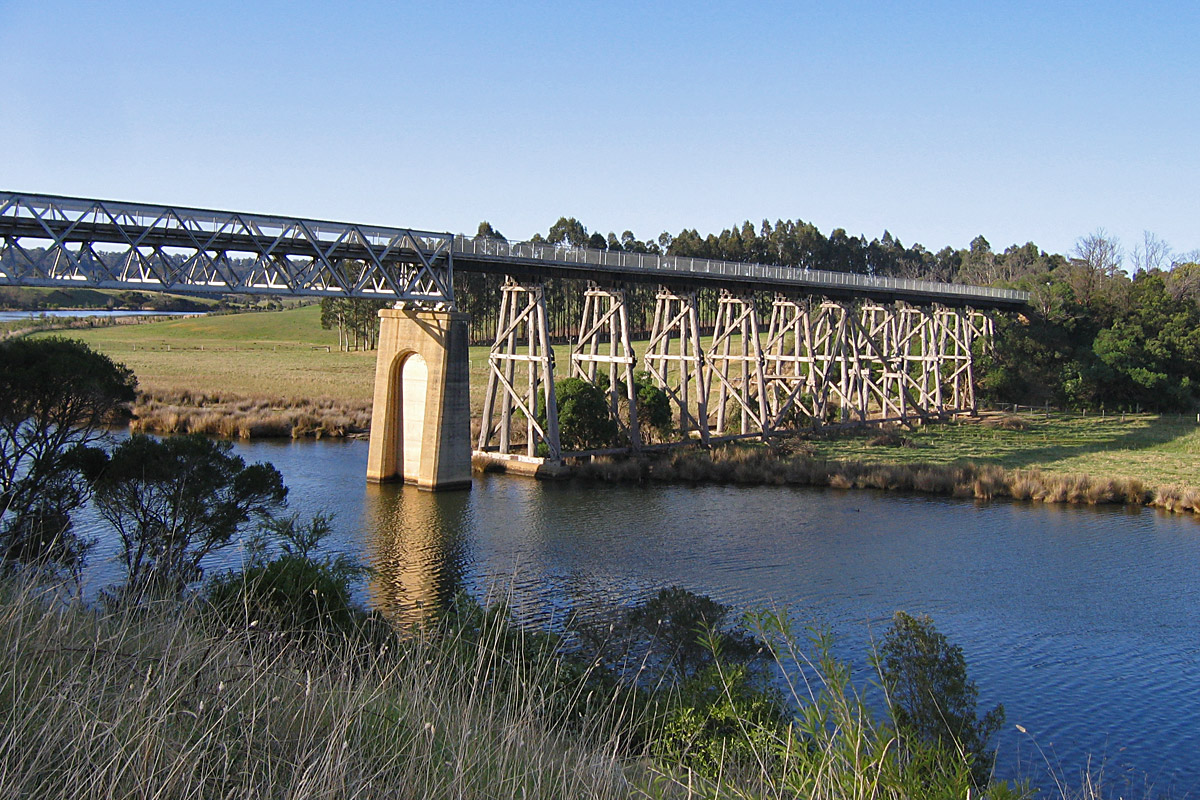
The former railway trestle bridge over the Nicholson River
