= Newmerella =

- Town
- Coordinates: 37°44′S 148°26′E
- Country: Australia
- State: Victoria
- LGA(s): Shire of East Gippsland
- Location: 370 km (230 mi) E of Melbourne; 5 km (3.1 mi) W of Orbost; 88 km (55 mi) E of Bairnsdale

Government
  - State electorate(s): Gippsland East
  - Federal division(s): Gippsland

Population
  - Total(s): 415 (2021 census)
- Postcode: 3886

Newmerella is a town in the Shire of East Gippsland, Victoria, Australia.At the 2021 census Newmerella had a population of 415. The township has one service station and a school (Newmerella Primary School) and is serviced by a school bus from Newmerella to Orbost for students attending Orbost Secondary College.
