= Nowa Nowa =

Town in Victoria, Australia

- Town
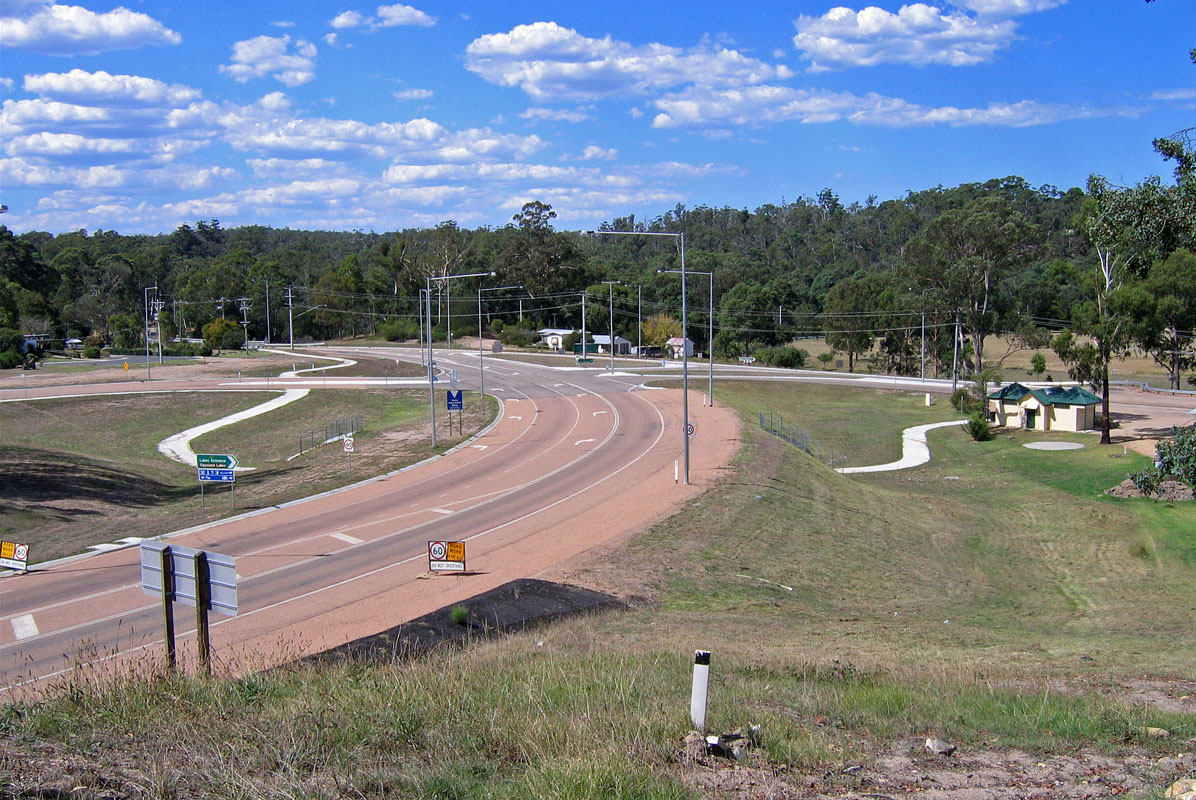
- Central part of town on the Princes Highway Nowa Nowa, is an Aboriginal word meaning the meeting of the waters.

- Interactive map of Nowa Nowa
- Coordinates: 37°43′0″S 148°06′0″E
- Country: Australia
- State: Victoria
- LGA: Shire of East Gippsland
- Location: 337 km (209 mi) E of Melbourne; 56 km (35 mi) E of Bairnsdale; 23 km (14 mi) NE of Lakes Entrance; 41 km (25 mi) W of Orbost

Government
  - State electorate: Gippsland East
  - Federal division: Gippsland
- Elevation: 30 m (98 ft)

Population
  - Total: 199 (2021 census)
- Postcode: 3887
- Mean max temp: 20.3 °C (68.5 °F)
- Mean min temp: 7.3 °C (45.1 °F)
- Annual rainfall: 857.2 mm (33.75 in)

Nowa Nowa is a town in the Shire of East Gippsland, Victoria, Australia. In lies on the Princes Highway east of Melbourne. At the 2021 census, Nowa Nowa had a population of 199.

== History ==
Nowa Nowa Post Office opened on 11 March 1893, though closed for about five years from 1895 to 1900.

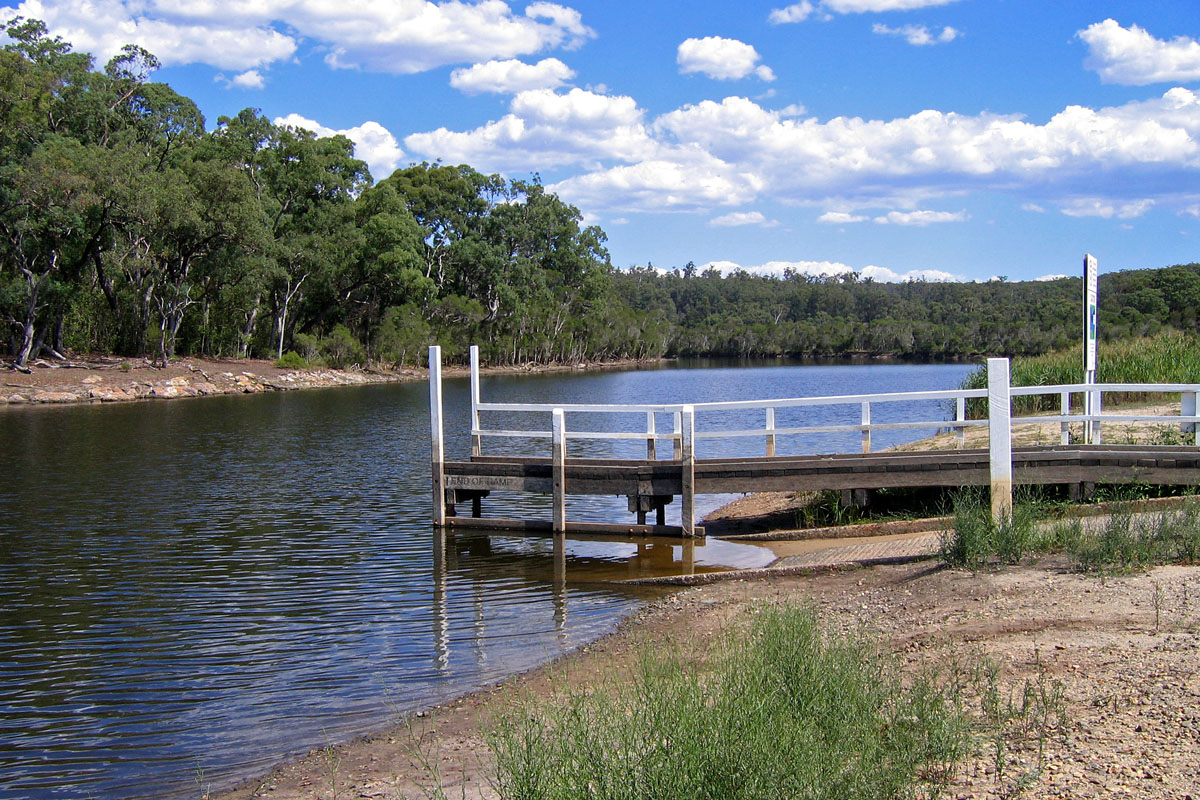
Boat ramp on the upper reaches of the Lake Tyers arm near the junction with Boggy Creek

Nowa Nowa railway station on the former Orbost railway line opened in April 1916, with the line closing in 1987.

== Scenery ==
The Nowa Nowa arm of Lake Tyers starts in Nowa Nowa. The East Gippsland Rail Trail which lies on the route of the old Orbost railway line and passes through Nowa Nowa.

Mount Nowa Nowa, 2 km NNE of the town has an old wooden fire-tower. Boggy Creek Gorge is on the northern edge of the town.

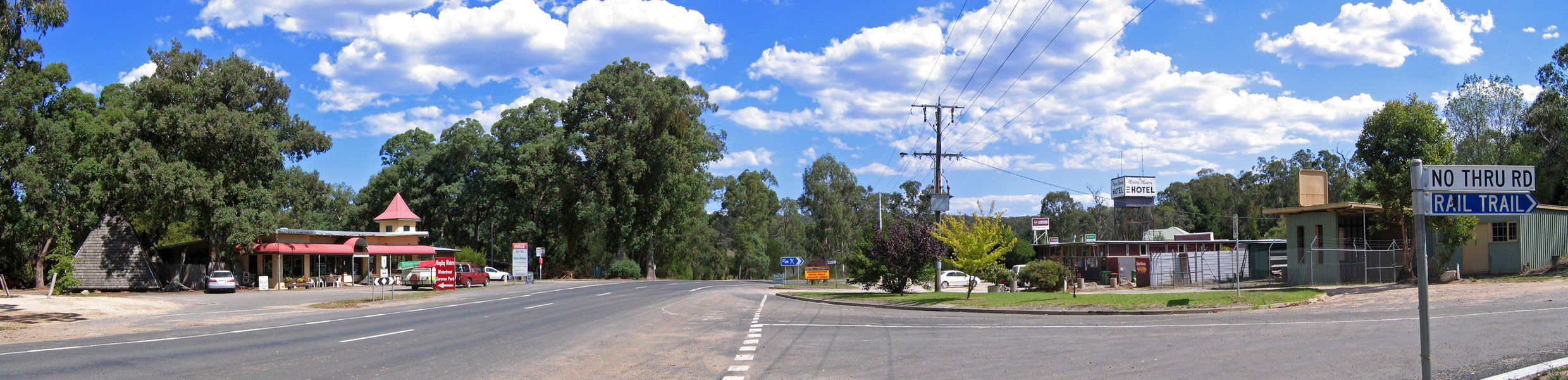
Nowa Nowa store and hotel on the Lakes Entrance road, with the East Gippsland Rail Trail passing through town

== Climate ==
Toorloo Arm, Princes Highway, Nowa Nowa

Nowa Nowa has a mild oceanic climate (Csb) with warm summers and cool winters, and moderate rainfall spread throughout the year.

Climate data for Nowa Nowa
Month	Jan	Feb	Mar	Apr	May	Jun	Jul	Aug	Sep	Oct	Nov	Dec	Year
Record high °C (°F)	44.3 (111.7)	43.2 (109.8)	39.4 (102.9)	32.9 (91.2)	28.5 (83.3)	22.2 (72.0)	23.1 (73.6)	24.8 (76.6)	31.3 (88.3)	31.8 (89.2)	37.6 (99.7)	37.7 (99.9)	44.3 (111.7)
Mean daily maximum °C (°F)	25.9 (78.6)	25.8 (78.4)	24.3 (75.7)	21.3 (70.3)	18.0 (64.4)	14.8 (58.6)	15.0 (59.0)	15.9 (60.6)	18.4 (65.1)	20.5 (68.9)	21.4 (70.5)	24.3 (75.7)	20.5 (68.9)
Mean daily minimum °C (°F)	11.9 (53.4)	12.9 (55.2)	11.0 (51.8)	7.8 (46.0)	5.6 (42.1)	2.8 (37.0)	2.0 (35.6)	2.8 (37.0)	4.5 (40.1)	7.0 (44.6)	8.6 (47.5)	10.6 (51.1)	7.3 (45.1)
Record low °C (°F)	3.3 (37.9)	3.9 (39.0)	3.0 (37.4)	−1.8 (28.8)	−2.0 (28.4)	−3.7 (25.3)	−4.4 (24.1)	−3.7 (25.3)	−2.3 (27.9)	0.2 (32.4)	1.8 (35.2)	2.9 (37.2)	−4.4 (24.1)
Average precipitation mm (inches)	64.0 (2.52)	54.9 (2.16)	59.7 (2.35)	67.6 (2.66)	72.3 (2.85)	91.7 (3.61)	63.6 (2.50)	62.2 (2.45)	71.1 (2.80)	78.0 (3.07)	88.0 (3.46)	80.6 (3.17)	866.7 (34.12)
Average precipitation days	8.6	7.9	9.1	9.0	11.7	12.2	12.1	12.8	12.1	12.7	11.3	10.6	130.1
Source: (temperatures, 1948–1975; rainfall, 1948–)
