= Orbost railway station =

Former railway station in Victoria, Australia

Orbost
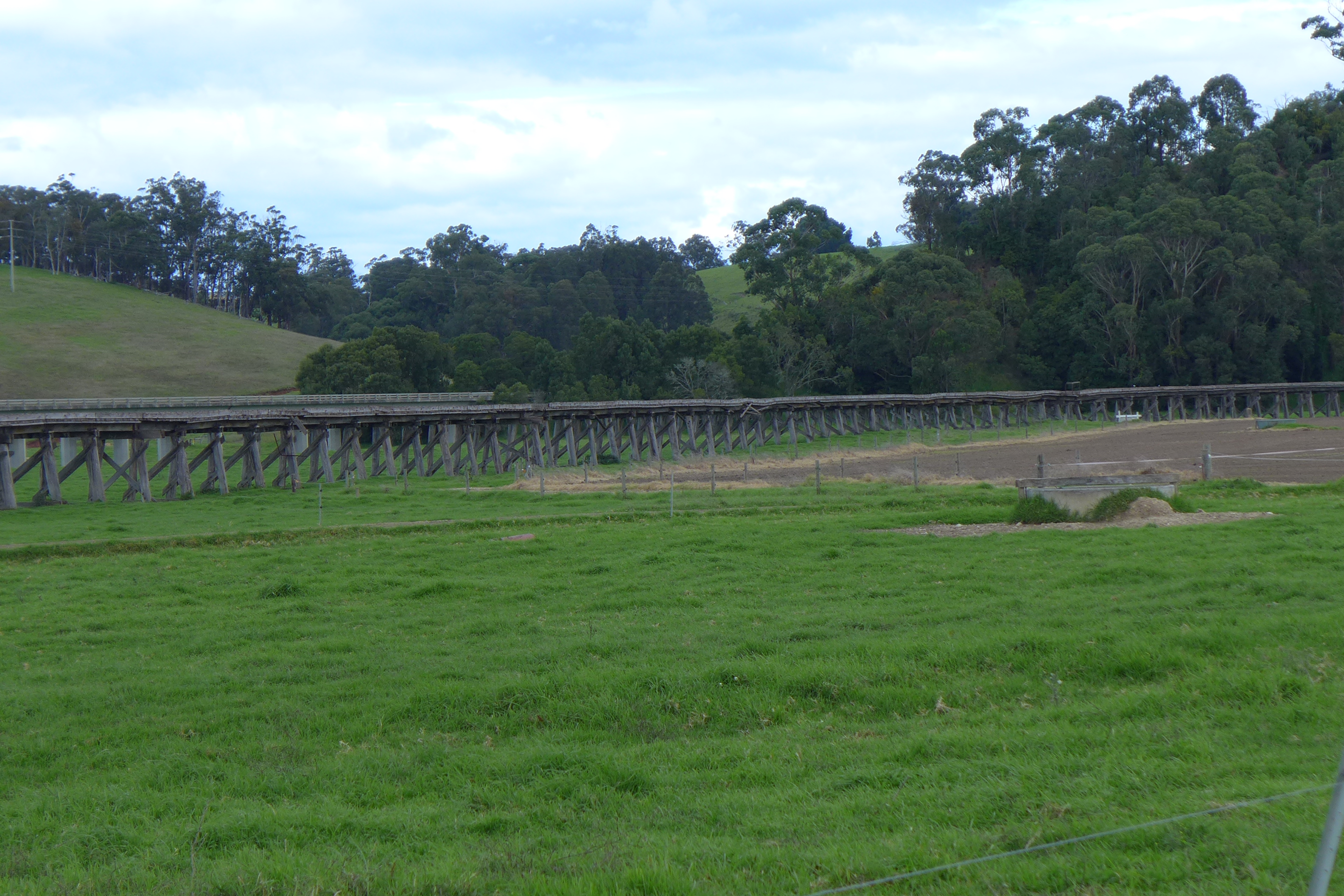
- Orbost railway station

General information
- Coordinates: 37°43′03″S 148°27′04″E
- Elevation: 9.4 m (31 ft)
- Line: Orbost
- Distance: 372.272 km from Flinders Street; 96.921 km from Bairnsdale
- Platforms: 1
- Tracks: 4

Other information
- Status: Closed

History
- Opened: 10 April 1916
- Closed: 24 August 1987

Services
Preceding station	Disused railways	Following station
Waygara	Orbost line	Terminus
List of closed railway stations in Victoria
Location
- Location within Shire of East Gippsland

Orbost railway station was located in Orbost, Victoria and was the terminus of the Orbost railway line. To save on the costs of a bridge over the Snowy River, which had highly variable levels, the station was located on the west side of the river, even though the town of Orbost was on the east side.

== History ==
The Orbost railway station was opened on 10 April 1916 and closed on 24 August 1987. Little evidence remains of the station itself, other than bits of the concrete face of the passenger platform.

== Bridges ==
Part of the former line were the Snowy River Floodplain Railway Bridges, two lengthy low-level bridges forming part of a causeway over the river flats, leading towards the station site. One bridge is 770 metres long and the other 183 metres long, and comprise a series of timber and steel trestles.
