= List of places on the Victorian Heritage Register in the Shire of East Gippsland =

This is a list of places on the Victorian Heritage Register in the Shire of East Gippsland in Victoria, Australia. The Victorian Heritage Register is maintained by the Heritage Council of Victoria.

The Victorian Heritage Register, as of 2021, lists the following thirty-four state-registered places within the Shire of East Gippsland:

| Place name | Place # | Location | Suburb or Town | Co-ordinates | Built | State registered | Photo |
|---|---|---|---|---|---|---|---|
| Anglican Church | H1796 | 485 Rules Road | Toorloo Arm | 37.839722°S 148.099250°E | 1878 | 27 May 1999 | |
| Bairnsdale Pumping Station | H2040 | Jennings Street and Main Street | Bairnsdale | 37.826083°S 147.594472°E | 1888 | 18 September 2003 | |
| Bendoc Union Church | H1775 | 16 Nichol Street | Bendoc | 37.148639°S 148.885500°E | 1903 | 18 February 1999 | |
| Buchan Caves Reserve | H1978 | Caves Road | Buchan | 37.496472°S 148.160528°E | N/A | 27 February 2003 | |
| Cassilis Gold Mining Company Treatment Works | H1941 | Bayliss Spur Road | Swifts Creek | 37.246722°S 147.606750°E | 1897 | 13 September 2001 | |
| Cobungra Bridge | H1854 | Omeo Highway | Anglers Rest | 36.992500°S 147.488222°E | 1940 | 18 November 1999 | |
| Court House | H1462 | 14 Nicholson Street | Bairnsdale | 37.824194°S 147.632111°E | 1892 | 20 August 1982 | |
| Delegate River Gold Diversion Tunnel | H1261 | Tunnel Ridge Track | Delegate River and Bendoc | 37.160472°S 148.793083°E | 1889 | 19 December 1996 | |
| Former Bairnsdale Hospital | H2310 | 14 McKean Street | Bairnsdale | 37.820639°S 147.606750°E | 1886 | 15 October 2012 | |
| Former Bairnsdale Mechanics Institute | H1284 | 20 Service Street | Bairnsdale | 37.825500°S 147.628694°E | 1888 | 9 January 1997 | |
| Former Omeo Post Office | H0650 | 155 Day Avenue | Omeo | 37.099639°S 147.593778°E | 1890 | 25 March 1987 | |
| Gambetta Reef Gold Battery Site | H1269 | Dry Gully Road | Omeo | 37.100694°S 147.538444°E | 1901 | 19 December 1996 | |
| Hinnomunjie bridge | H0917 | Omeo Valley Road | Omeo Valley | 36.946208°S 147.605653°E | 1910 | 3 June 1992 | |
| Houghton's Flat Gold Diversion Tunnel | H1262 | Slaughter Walking Track | Deptford | 37.593972°S 147.703833°E | 1873 | 19 December 1996 | |
| McKillops Bridge | H1849 | McKillops Road | Deddick Valley & Wulgulmerang East | 37.084111°S 148.413250°E | 1931 | 18 November 1999 | |
| Mossiface Hop Kilns | H0540 | 1144 Swan Reach Road | Mossiface | 37.736750°S 147.813861°E | 1881 | 6 July 1983 | |
| Mount Hepburn Company Gold Treatment Works | H1940 | Cassilis Road | Tongio | 37.252917°S 147.629361°E | 1896 | 13 September 2001 | |
| Murrindal River Truss Bridge | H2311 | Basin Road | Buchan | 37.489861°S 148.230028°E | 1927 | 13 September 2012 | |
| New Chum Gold Battery Site | H1271 | Degreaves Track | Benambra | 36.991417°S 147.871833°E | 1898 | 19 December 1996 | | |
| New Works Historic Complex | H1532 | The Hummocks The Entrance | Lakes Entrance Nyerimilang | 37.888209°S 147.976193°E 37.890000°S 147.967111°E | 1869 | 26 July 1989 | |
| Odells Gully Gold Battery Site | H1275 | Odells Track | Swifts Creek | 37.290972°S 147.556361°E | 1851 | 19 December 1996 | |
| Omeo Justice Precinct | H1536 | 173-175 Day Avenue | Omeo | 37.101139°S 147.592444°E | 1858 | 20 August 1982 | |
| Oriental Claims Hydraulic Sluicing Site | H1225 | Great Alpine Road | Omeo | 37.107806°S 147.573778°E | 1851 | 28 November 1996 | |
| Peter Ah Sen's Sawmill | H2021 | Splitters Range Road | Omeo | 37.142278°S 147.679694°E | 1881 | 20 March 2003 | |
| Pioneer Battery Site | H1429 | Gay Road | Errinundra | 37.401333°S 148.869194°E | 1898 | 12 February 1998 | |
| Point Hicks Lightstation | H1983 | Lighthouse Track | Tamboon | 37.801866°S 149.275640°E | 1888 | 12 February 2004 | |
| Rail Bridge | H1436 | Over Stony Creek | Nowa Nowa | 37.743138°S 148.044033°E | 1916 | 20 August 1982 | |
| Slip and Winch Shed | H1648 | 60-74 Slip Road | Paynesville | 37.912250°S 147.728306°E | 1887 | 20 August 1982 | |
| St Mary's Catholic Church | H2174 | 240-256 Main Street | Bairnsdale | 37.826139°S 147.627028°E | 1913 | 9 October 2008 | |
| Stringers Knob Fire Spotting Tower | H2244 | Monument Track | Bete Bolong North | 37.617361°S 148.270111°E | 1941 | 8 July 2010 | |
| Timber Truss and Concrete Bridge | H1214 | Old Princes Highway | Genoa | 37.473889°S 149.592167°E | 1928 | 24 October 1996 | |
| Victoria Falls Hydro-Electric Power Station | H1942 | Victoria Falls Road | Cobungra | 37.075250°S 147.455778°E | 1907 | 13 September 2001 | |
| Wallaces Hut | H1616 | Wallaces Track | Nelse | 36.896750°S 147.307417°E | 1889 | 20 August 1982 | |
| Washington Winch | H1825 | Nunniong Road | Nunniong | 37.212389°S 147.888750°E | 1960 | 17 June 1999 | |
