= Clifton Creek =

Clifton Creek Victoria
- Coordinates: 37.7102251°S 147.666731°E
- Population: 237 (2016 census)
- Postcode(s): 3875
- Location: 12 km (7 mi) N of Bairnsdale; 237 km (147 mi) E of Melbourne
- LGA(s): Shire of East Gippsland
- State electorate(s): Gippsland East
- Federal division(s): Gippsland
Suburbs around Clifton Creek:
| Bullumwaal | Waterholes | Fairy Dell |
| Mount Taylor | Clifton Creek | Fairy Dell |
| Mount Taylor | Wy Yung; Granite Rock | Sarsfield |

Clifton Creek is a locality in the Shire of East Gippsland, Victoria, Australia. In the 2016 census, Clifton Creek had a population of 237 people.

Clifton Creek Primary School (No. 3684) opened in 1911. It operated part-time or closed at various times as enrolment levels fluctuated, but had enough students for two teachers from the 1980s. The school was destroyed by fire on 31 December 2019 during the 2019-20 East Gippsland bushfires. The community were reportedly divided on whether to rebuild, with the local Country Fire Authority captain arguing against rebuilding and parents of schoolchildren supporting its retention, but the state government has pledged to rebuild the school.

The town also contains a public hall and recreation reserve.

Clifton Creek Post Office opened on 4 February 1913 and closed on 30 June 1919. Clifton Creek Telephone Office opened on 22 December 1927 but was replaced by the Fairhope Telephone Office on 4 July 1928.

Gold was first discovered at Clifton Creek in the 1860s, with more substantial deposits discovered in the mid-1890s. It saw substantial mining in the late 1890s, and occasional prospecting thereafter. A government battery was erected there, but was dismantled and moved to Store Creek, near Deptford, in 1898.

The town was badly damaged by the 2019-20 East Gippsland bushfires, with a number of houses destroyed as well as the school.

The broader Clifton Creek locality also includes the former settlement of Fairhope. The Fairhope Telephone Office opened on 4 July 1928 and closed on 21 November 1967.
