= Shire of Bairnsdale =

Coordinates: 37°50′S 147°37′E

- Local government area
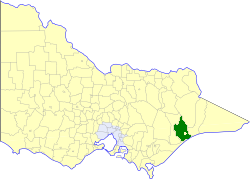
- Location in Victoria

- The Shire of Bairnsdale as at its dissolution in 1994
- Country: Australia
- State: Victoria
- Region: East Gippsland
- Established: 1867
- Council seat: Bairnsdale

Area
  - Total: 2,277.9 km^{2} (879.5 sq mi)

Population
  - Total(s): 7,670 (1992)
  - Density: 3.3671/km^{2} (8.721/sq mi)
- County: Tanjil, Dargo, Wonnangatta
LGAs around Shire of Bairnsdale
Avon	Omeo	Omeo
Avon	Shire of Bairnsdale	Tambo
Rosedale	Rosedale	Bass Strait

The Shire of Bairnsdale was a local government area located approximately 280 kilometres (174 mi) east of Melbourne, the state capital of Victoria, Australia. The shire covered an area of 2,277.9 square kilometres (879.5 sq mi), and existed from 1867 until 1994. For its first one hundred years it governed both Bairnsdale and the surrounding area; however, after that time, Bairnsdale itself had its own local government authority.

== History ==
Bairnsdale was first incorporated as a road district on 30 April 1867, and became a shire on 14 July 1868. On 6 January 1882, the Shire of Tambo, centred on Lakes Entrance, split away from Bairnsdale. On 27 May 1914 and 1 October 1964, it lost some land to its west to the Shire of Avon. On 31 May 1967, after a poll of ratepayers, the Centre Riding and parts of the East Riding severed, to form the Town of Bairnsdale, which became a city in 1990.

On 2 December 1994, the Shire of Bairnsdale was abolished, and along with the City of Bairnsdale, the Shires of Orbost and Tambo, parts of the Shire of Omeo and the Boole Boole Peninsula region from the Shire of Rosedale, was merged into the newly created Shire of East Gippsland. The West Dargo region was transferred to the newly created Shire of Wellington.

== Wards ==
The Shire of Bairnsdale was divided into three ridings, each of which elected three councillors:

- East Riding
- West Riding
- South Riding

== Towns and localities ==
- Eagle Point
- Fernbank
- Iguana Creek
- Lindenow
- Lucknow
- Mount Taylor
- Paynesville
- Walba
- Wy Yung

== Population ==
Year	Population
1954	10,104
1958	10,880*
1961	11,198
1966	11,559
1971	3,741
1976	4,473
1981	5,245
1986	6,481
1991	7,239

* Estimate in the 1958 Victorian Year Book.
