= Timbarra River =

Timbarra River may refer to:

- Timbarra River (New South Wales)
- Timbarra River (Victoria)
