= Shire of Orbost =

Coordinates: 37°42′S 148°27′E

Shire of Orbost Victoria
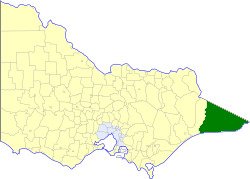
- Location in Victoria
- The Shire of Orbost as at its dissolution in 1994
- Population: 6,730 (1992)
  - Density: 0.7200/km^{2} (1.8648/sq mi)
- Established: 1892
- Area: 9,347 km^{2} (3,608.9 sq mi)
- Council seat: Orbost
- Region: East Gippsland
- County: Croajingolong, Tambo
LGAs around Shire of Orbost:
Snowy River (NSW)	Bombala (NSW)	Bega Valley (NSW)
Tambo	Shire of Orbost	Tasman Sea
Tambo	Bass Strait	Tasman Sea

The Shire of Orbost was a local government area about 380 kilometres (236 mi) east of Melbourne, the state capital of Victoria, Australia. The shire covered an area of 9,347 square kilometres (3,608.9 sq mi), and existed from 1892 until 1994.

== History ==
Originally, Orbost was part of the Bairnsdale Road District, which was created on 30 April 1867. Splitting away as part of the Shire of Tambo in 1882, Orbost was first incorporated as a shire in its own right, as the Shire of Croajingolong, on 30 May 1892. It was renamed as the Shire of Orbost on 17 February 1893. On 3 January 1913, part of its western riding was annexed to Tambo as its Cunninghame Riding.

On 2 December 1994, the Shire of Orbost was abolished, and along with the City of Bairnsdale, the Shires of Bairnsdale and Tambo, and parts of the Shire of Omeo and the Boole Boole Peninsula from the Shire of Rosedale, was merged into the newly created Shire of East Gippsland.

== Wards ==
Orbost was divided into four ridings on 31 May 1895, each of which elected three councillors:

- North Riding
- South Riding
- East Riding
- Central Riding

== Towns and localities ==
- Bellbird Creek
- Bendoc
- Bonang
- Cann River
- Club Terrace
- Genoa
- Mallacoota
- Marlo
- Newmerella
- Orbost*

* Council seat.

== Population ==
Year	Population
1954	5,492
1958	5,700*
1961	6,179
1966	6,414
1971	6,301
1976	6,205
1981	6,058
1986	6,131
1991	6,562

* Estimate in the 1958 Victorian Year Book.
