= Shire of Tambo =

Shire of Tambo may refer to:

- Shire of Tambo (Queensland), a former local government area in the state of Queensland, Australia
- Shire of Tambo (Victoria), a former local government area in the state of Victoria, Australia
