= Deptford, Victoria =

Deptford Victoria
- Coordinates: 37.571307°S 147.6833378°E
- Population: 0 (2016 census)
- Postcode(s): 3875
- Location: 27 km (17 mi) N of Bairnsdale; 241 km (150 mi) E of Melbourne
- LGA(s): Shire of East Gippsland
- State electorate(s): Gippsland East
- Federal division(s): Gippsland
Suburbs around Deptford:
Marthavale	Stirling	Tambo Crossing
Ryans	Deptford	Double Bridges
Bullumwaal	Waterholes; Fairy Dell	Bruthen

Deptford is a locality in the Shire of East Gippsland, Victoria, Australia. In the 2016 census, Deptford had a population of 0.

A former mining town of which little remains, the Deptford locality today is entirely located in state forests, variously the Yowen-Burrun State Forest, Warriballat State Forest, Haunted Stream State Forest and the Bruthen State Forest. The former townsite, on the Nicholson River, is now the Deptford Picnic Area. The Haughtons Flat Diversion Tunnel, south of the old townsite, is listed on the Victorian Heritage Register.

Deptford was established in 1864, replacing the nearby Store Creek settlement as the service town for the Nicholson River Goldfield. Mining in the area was largely shaft-based across three main reefs, with some small-scale alluvial prospecting in the Nicholson River. The population varied over the decades depending on the state of the mining industry, peaking at approximately 300.

In 1867, the town had two stores, two butchers' shops and a bakery, with two hotels under construction. The Gippsland Times said of Deptford: "The manners and customs of the place are of a primitive nature, interspersed with a good deal of drinking and civil fights, especially on Saturday nights, a good index that there is money in circulation". The town had no doctors, clergymen or policemen at that time. All buildings apart from the store, a hotel and three timber houses were reportedly "simple bush structures of spars and bark".

The Travellers' Rest Hotel (also known as the Miners' Rest Hotel) opened in 1865, was extended in 1894, and burned down in 1905. The first Deptford Post Office opened on 22 February 1868 and closed around September 1878; the second opened on 16 February 1885, was downgraded to a receiving office on 1 July 1927 and closed on 30 June 1928. Deptford State School (No. 3151) opened in January 1892 and closed in 1928. A church, used by both Anglican and Presbyterian congregations, was built in the 1890s.

The original Deptford cemetery was located on Navigation Creek, but was eroded by flooding and was subsequently moved. The first recorded burial was in 1870 and the last in 1898 - the year in which the cemetery was officially gazetted.

The former Store Creek settlement is now located within the broader locality of Deptford. It was the main settlement on the goldfield prior to the founding of Deptford. A government battery there was established in 1898.
