= Timbarra River (Victoria) =

Timbarra
- Location of the Timbarra River mouth in Victoria

Location
- Country: Australia
- State: Victoria
- Region: South East Corner (IBRA), Victorian Alps, East Gippsland
- Local government area: Shire of East Gippsland

Physical characteristics
- Source: Nunniong Plains, Great Dividing Range
  - location: below Blue Shirt Hill, Victorian Alps
  - coordinates: 37°7′40″S 147°59′47″E
  - elevation: 1,260 m (4,130 ft)
- Mouth: confluence with the Tambo River
  - location: southeast of Tambo Crossing
  - coordinates: 37°33′57″S 147°58′13″E
  - elevation: 88 m (289 ft)
- Length: 90 km (56 mi)

Basin features
- River system: Mitchell River catchment
- Tributaries
  - right: Back River (Victoria), Wilkinson Creek, Cutts Creek, Mount Elizabeth Creek

The Timbarra River is a perennial river of the Mitchell River catchment, in the East Gippsland region of the Australian state of Victoria.

== Course and features ==
The Timbarra River rises on the Nunniong Plains, below Blue Shirt Hill, that is part of the Victorian Alps of the Great Dividing Range; approximately 30 kilometres (19 mi) east of Omeo. The river flows through the Nunniong Plain and the Mount Elizabeth scenic reserves; generally south, then east, then south, then south by east, then southwest, joined by the Back River and three minor tributaries, before reaching its confluence with the Tambo River about 10 kilometres (6.2 mi) southeast of Tambo Crossing in the Shire of East Gippsland. The river descends 1,170 metres (3,840 ft) over its 90-kilometre (56 mi) course; much of which is through forested mountain areas and steep gorges, with a bed of gravel, boulders and mud and numerous pools. Along its route it passes through the small settlement of Timbarra, about 30 kilometres (19 mi) northwest of Buchan.

Together with the Nicholson, Tambo, and Mitchell rivers, and their respective drainage basins, including the Timbarra River, the rivers empty into the Gippsland Lakes and flow into Bass Strait.

The isolated Timbarra River Gorge, 8 kilometres (5.0 mi) north of Timbarra, has been classified as a site of local significance by the Geological Society of Australia.

== Ecology and recreation ==
The Timbarra River is in good environmental condition, and maintains a reliable year-round flow.

Although access to the river is difficult, it remains popular for fishing, especially for the introduced brown trout which spawn naturally in the river without the need for artificial stocking. Native fish found in the river include the vulnerable Australian grayling, the river blackfish, tupong, and eels.

The Swifts Creek School has named one of its sports houses Timbara, after the river.

== See also ==
- List of rivers of Australia
