= Back River (Victoria) =

River in Victoria, Australia

Back
- Location of the Back River mouth in Victoria

Location
- Country: Australia
- State: Victoria
- Region: South East Corner (IBRA), Victorian Alps
- Local government area: Shire of East Gippsland

Physical characteristics
- Source: Nunniong Plains, Great Dividing Range
  - location: below Mount Bindi
  - elevation: 1,380 m (4,530 ft)
- Mouth: confluence with the Timbarra River
  - location: northeast of Ensay
  - coordinates: 37°13′24″S 147°58′17″E
  - elevation: 796 m (2,612 ft)
- Length: 11 km (6.8 mi)

Basin features
- River system: Mitchell River catchment

The Back River is a perennial river of the Mitchell River catchment, in the Alpine region of the Australian state of Victoria.

== Course and features ==
The Back River rises on the Nunniong Plains, below Mount Bindi, that is part of the Great Dividing Range; in remote country east of Omeo. The river flows generally east, then southeast, before reaching its confluence with the Timbarra River in a state forestry area, about 10 kilometres (6.2 mi) northeast of Ensay in the Shire of East Gippsland. The river descends 588 metres (1,929 ft) over its 11 kilometres (6.8 mi) course.
