= Mr. Stringy =

The second Mr Stringy was carved into a log by Mr Bill Henham in the mid to late 1960s.
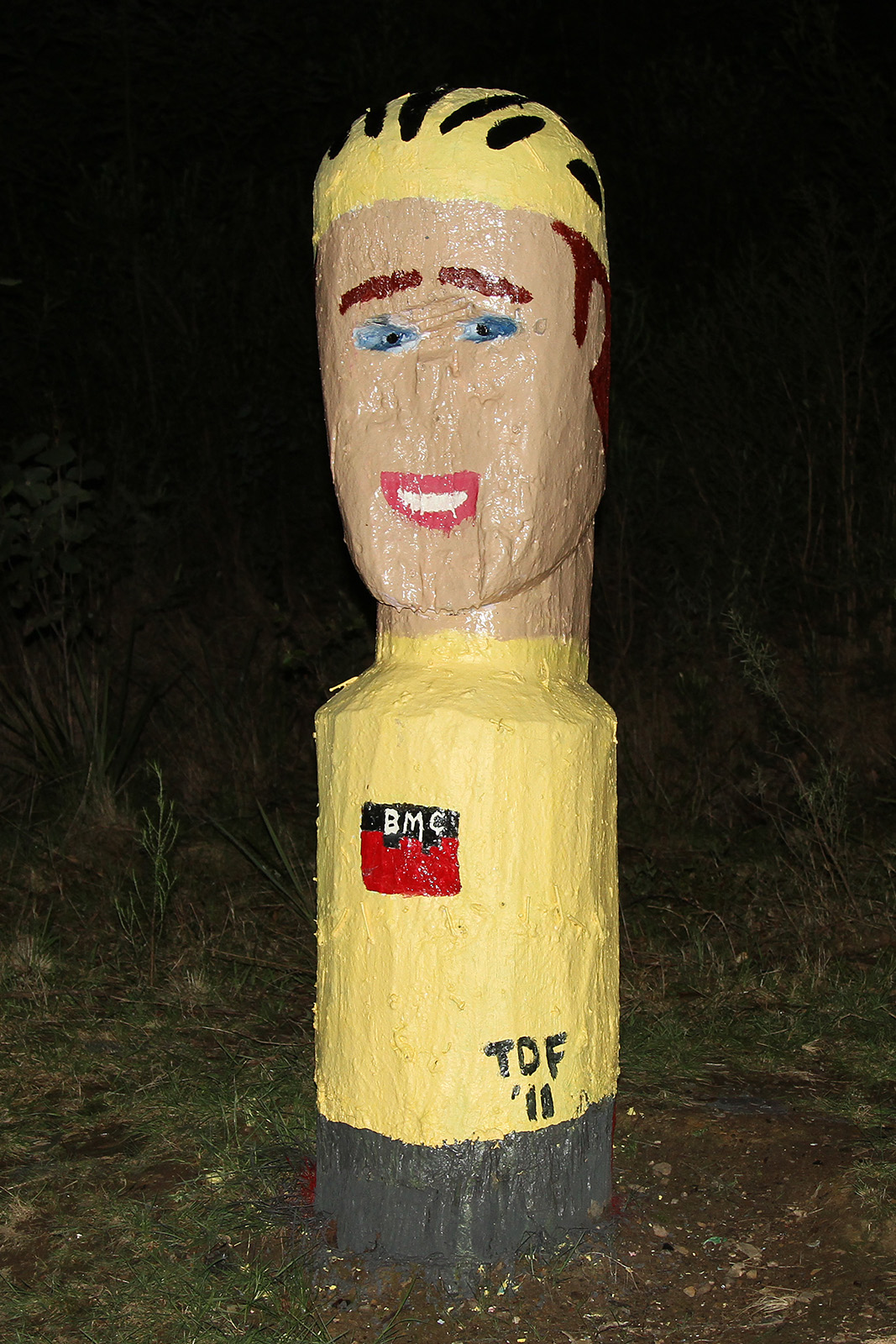
- Mr Stringy as Cadel Evans, Sept. 2011.
- Artist: Multiple anonymous artists
- Type: Sculpture
- Medium: Wood and paint
- Dimensions: 1.67 m (5.5 ft); 0.40 m diameter (1.3 ft)
- Location: Tambo Crossing, East Gippsland; 37°27′33″S 147°49′59″E
- Owner: Communal

Mr Stringy, also known as The Wooden Man or just The Man, is a piece of folk art that has become a popular tourist attraction on the Great Alpine Road in East Gippsland, Victoria, Australia.

The first Mr Stringy was carved into a tree stump in about 1929, whereas the current Mr Stringy was carved from a stringybark log buried into ground in the mid-to-late 1960s. He is regularly repainted as different characters by anonymous community members.

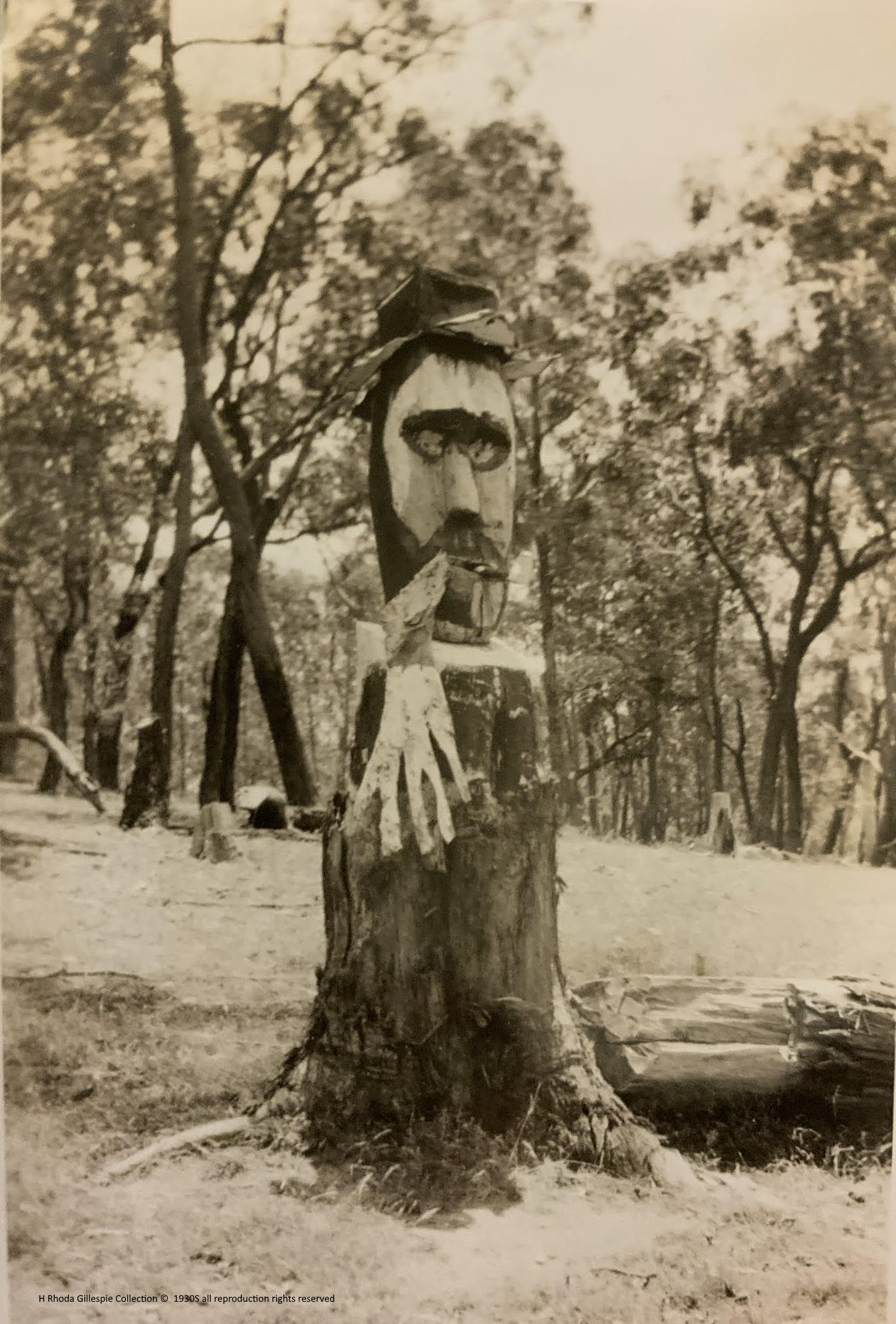
The original Mr Stringy was known as Mr Smokey and was carved into a tree stump by Mr Bill Henham in about 1929.

== History ==
Gippsland has a rich history of carved wooden characters across its extensive State forests and roadsides. They include Pons asinorum near Cann River (early 1920s), Alfonso Spaghetti near Orbost (1924), the first Mr Stringy at Dead Horse Gap (1929), several Fish Faithfull sculptures near Omeo (1930s), the Parnaby Bushfire Totems at Noorinbee (1951), the second Mr Stringy (late 1960s), through to the more recent Pretty Boy near Dargo (2016). Most are gone now, having rotted away, burnt by bushfires, stolen or damaged by vandals, their stories often lost. Gippsland's most famous surviving wooden man is Mr Stringy who stands stoically at Dead Horse Flat on a lonely stretch of the Great Alpine Road between Bairnsdale and Omeo.

There is often some confusion, but there have been two Mr Stringys at this remote spot.

The original was carved into a tree stump in about 1929 by William (Bill) Harold Henham of Murrindal who was working on a nearby Country Roads Board (CRB) bridge.

Bill initially named him Mr Smokey, and it's unclear when or how his name changed.

Some early references claim he was carved by someone called "Jimmy the Liar", but now it is generally accepted that Bill Henham carved him, and that this may have just been a nickname given to him by local CRB crews.

A newspaper article in the Melbourne Herald in March 1935 referred to him as Mr Samuel Stringy and characterised him as a 'good Australian'. This article went on to say:

His roots reach deep into the rich soil that skirts the road to Omeo and he has the rugged face of one accustomed to shave with an axe. Samuel is but one of the many influences in the Omeo District which turn the thoughts of travellers to time-honored stories of the Outback – to the famous Tichbourne Trial and the ghosts inhabiting the valleys along the Tambo

— Basil Hall, Ghosts of the Tambo Valley, The Herald (Melbourne), 30 March 1935

Other colloquial names included "Mr Stumpy", "The Wooden Man" or simply "The Man".

He stood about 6 foot tall and there were many iterations of his appearance over the decades as historical photos reveal. He began with a kerosene tin hat, five o'clock shadow and was smoking a pipe with his right hand. Arms were later added and then removed, a moustache and heavy eyebrow were painted, along with legs.

He was repeatedly vandalised and finally beheaded in the mid-to-late 1960s.

The second, and current, Mr Stringy was carved by Bill at the request of the Omeo Shire. It is located close to the edge of the road and near to the original tree stump, which is now gone.

The current Mr Stringy is a heavy log set into the ground compared to the previous tree stump.

At the time, Bill Henham also made a copy of Mr Stringy which he kept outside his home in Morrison Street Bairnsdale and used as a letterbox. It still survives with the family and is now owned by his eldest grandson, Graham Wigg.

Mr Stringy has been refurbished many times and was once routinely maintained by CRB road crews with leftover paint. It is not certain when the community first began painting Mr Stringy into his many unique characters.

== Current Description ==
The current Mr Stringy is located at Dead Horse Flat on a remote and isolated section of the Great Alpine Road alongside the Tambo River in East Gippsland, at an elevation of 203 m (666 ft). The nearest habitation is the small farming community of Tambo Crossing, some 8 km (5.0 mi) south of the sculpture, with the nearest population centres being the small towns of Ensay 12 km (7.5 mi) north, and Bruthen 39 km (24 mi) south.

The current Mr Stringy is carved from a single timber log, with an over-large head and torso but without legs or arms. The wood used is probably a piece of durable box or stringybark, from which the name was possibly derived.

Mr Stringy stands 1.67 m (5 ft 6 in) tall above ground, with a further 0.5 m (1 ft 8 in) buried below. He has a diameter of 0.40 m (1 ft 4 in) and a circumference of 1.325 m (4 ft 4.2 in). The carved head, neck, and shoulders take up half of the height above ground, with the remainder being the undifferentiated torso. The face area has been flattened from the natural curve of the log, and has carved eye sockets and the remains of a nose, which has possibly been lost at some time by weathering or by vandalism.

== Folk art ==
Mr Stringy is regularly and anonymously repainted as different characters, usually by members of the local community. The painting and maintenance of Mr Stringy is not funded nor coordinated by any government or private organisation or individual, and is a type of modern folk art for the Tambo Valley and Omeo District. Despite not being officially recognised, redecoration of Mr Stringy is condoned and encouraged by both the community and local authorities.

The characters often of a topical nature, such as a player from the Omeo & District Football League premiership football or netball team for that year, a cyclist to mark the Great Victorian Bike Ride when it travelled along the Great Alpine Road, and Cadel Evans following his win in the 2011 Tour de France. The sculpture is sometimes painted as generic characters, for example a blushing bride, or a skier around the start of the ski season. Alternatively it may be painted as a figure from popular culture, such as Homer Simpson or Wonder Woman. More recently he was painted as a tribute to firefighters after the 2019- 2020 bushfires.

Mr Stringy is sometimes just given a mild makeover, such as by modifying an existing painted character by adding a piece of clothing or simple decoration like balloons, ribbons, or streamers. This is often to celebrate an occasion such as Christmas or a sporting victory. At other times it is poorly painted or mildly vandalised. For example, he once had a tin of black paint poured over him and local community members promptly respond by redecorating and repainting him into a new character.

The unlikely existence of Mr Stringy in a remote roadside location, and his regularly changing characters, make him a popular figure with current and former locals of the district, as well as a tourist attraction for visitors to the area.

== Thefts and vandalism ==
Due to its remote location and prominence, the sculpture is a relatively easy target for vandalism, although its local popularity makes genuine vandalism rare. While the heavy log acts as a deterrent, it has also been modified and strengthened to prevent further theft or damage.

Despite the increased security measures, Mr Stringy was stolen in October 2010 after being winched out of the ground by unknown thieves. The Victoria Police officer based in Omeo described the theft of this "icon of the area" as "the work of some idiot", and stated that it was "a bloody disgrace". Mr Stringy was later found dumped down a nearby embankment of the Tambo River, and was retrieved and reinstated by forestry staff from the Department of Sustainability and Environment Office at Swifts Creek.

== Gallery ==
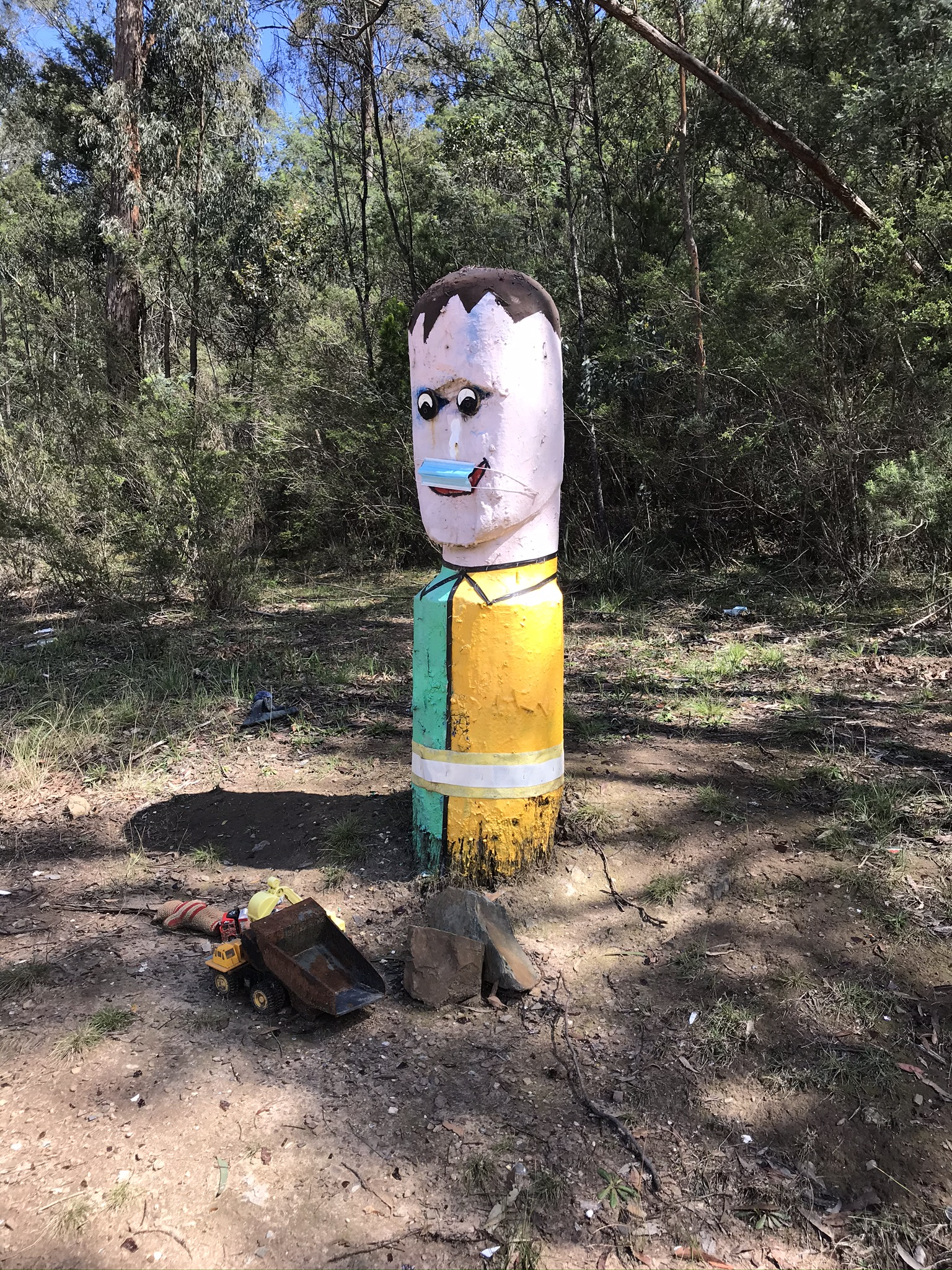
Mr Stringy painted as an emergency firefighter (Green - FFMVic and yellow - CFA) wearing a mask during Covid - 2020.

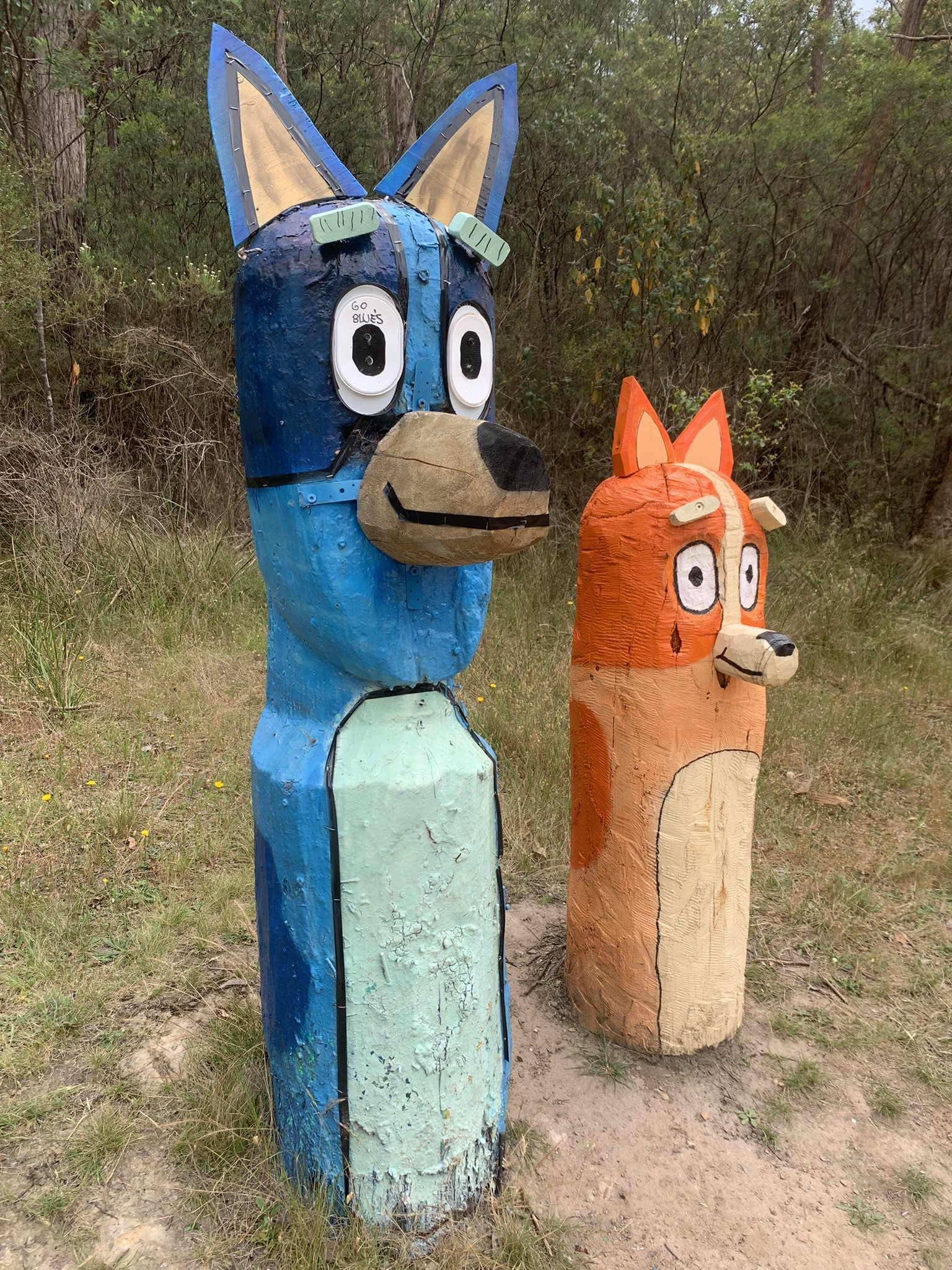
Mr Stringy with his new friend Bingo (based on ABC TV characters) - 2023.
