= Eastwood, Victoria =

Eastwood Victoria
- Coordinates: 37°48′49″S 147°37′56″E
- Population: 2,855 (2021 census)
- Postcode(s): 3875
- LGA(s): Shire of East Gippsland
- State electorate(s): Gippsland East
- Federal division(s): Gippsland

Eastwood is a suburb of Bairnsdale in the Shire of East Gippsland, Victoria, Australia. At the 2021 census, Eastwood had a population of 2,855.
