= Shire of Omeo =

Coordinates: 37°05′S 147°35′E

Shire of Omeo Victoria
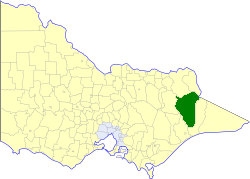
- Location in Victoria
- The Shire of Omeo as at its dissolution in 1994
- Population: 1,680 (1992)
  - Density: 0.2978/km^{2} (0.7713/sq mi)
- Established: 1872
- Area: 5,641 km^{2} (2,178.0 sq mi)
- Council seat: Omeo
- Region: East Gippsland
- County: Bogong, Benambra, Dargo, Tambo
LGAs around Shire of Omeo:
Bright	Tallangatta	Upper Murray
Bright	Shire of Omeo	Tambo
Avon	Bairnsdale	Tambo

The Shire of Omeo was a local government area about 390 kilometres (242 mi) east-north-east of Melbourne, the state capital of Victoria, Australia. The shire covered an area of 5,641 square kilometres (2,178.0 sq mi), and existed from 1872 until 1994.

== History ==
Omeo was incorporated as a shire on 25 October 1872.

On 2 December 1994, the Shire of Omeo was abolished, and along with the City of Bairnsdale, the Shires of Bairnsdale and Tambo, and the Boole Boole Peninsula from the Shire of Rosedale, was merged into the newly created Shire of East Gippsland. The Dinner Plain district was merged into the Shire of Alpine, which had been created two weeks earlier.

== Ridings ==
Omeo was divided into four ridings on 15 January 1957, each of which elected three councillors:

- Omeo Riding
- Ensay Riding
- Hinnomunjie Riding
- Tongio Riding

== Towns and localities ==
- Benambra
- Brookville
- Cassilis
- Dinner Plain
- Doctors Flat
- Ensay
- Hinnomunjie
- Omeo*
- Swifts Creek
- Tambo Crossing
- Tongio
- Uplands

* Council seat.

== Population ==
Year	Population
1954	2,072
1958	2,100*
1961	2,145
1966	2,026
1971	1,858
1976	1,605
1981	1,565
1986	1,628
1991	1,920

* Estimate in the 1958 Victorian Year Book.
