= Wingan River, Victoria =

Wingan River
- Suburb
- Coordinates: 37.6295587°S 149.5300448°E
- Country: Australia
- State: Victoria
- LGA: Shire of East Gippsland
- Location: 27 km (17 mi) W of Mallacoota; 396 km (246 mi) E of Melbourne

Government
  - State electorate: Gippsland East
  - Federal division: Gippsland

Population
  - Total: 0 (2016 census)
- Postcode: 3891
Suburbs around Wingan River
| Noorinbee North | Genoa | Genoa |
| Tamboon; Noorinbee | Wingan River | Bass Strait |
| Bass Strait | Bass Strait | Bass Strait |

Wingan River is a locality in the Shire of East Gippsland, Victoria, Australia. It is situated on the river of the same name. In the 2016 census, Wingan River had a population of 0.

== Sorroundings ==
The area is heavily forested and almost entirely contained within state forests or national parks, variously the Drummer State Forest (northern part), Alfred National Park (western part) and the Wingan State Forest and Croajingolong National Park (remaining areas). The Princes Highway runs through the locality, which has few other roads. The Wingan Inlet Campground is located along Wingan Beach.

== History ==
Gold mining was conducted in the area during the 1910s. A state battery opened in 1916, but by 1932 was reported to have been "rusting away" for many years. The first Wingan River Post Office opened on 1 November 1936 and closed on 30 November 1943, while the second opened on 15 May 1947 and closed on 30 June 1979.

The locality was badly damaged during the 2019–20 Australian bushfire season, with a fire that began at Wingan River in late December subsequently burning through to the coastal town of Mallacoota on New Year's Day.
