= Wiseleigh, Victoria =

Wiseleigh
- Town
- Coordinates: 37°42′44.24″S 147°48′26.06″E
- Country: Australia
- State: Victoria
- LGA: Shire of East Gippsland

Government
  - State electorate: Gippsland East
  - Federal division: Gippsland

Population
  - Total: 177 (2021 census)
- Postcode: 3885

Wiseleigh is a town in the Shire of East Gippsland, in the Australian state of Victoria.
