= Stringers Knob Fire Spotting Tower =

Coordinates: 37°37′02″S 148°16′12″E

The Stringers Knob Fire Spotting Tower, in East Gippsland Shire, Victoria, Australia, is a fire lookout tower that is listed on the Victorian Heritage Register. Of an unusual single-pole design, it was built in 1941 as part of a network of fire-spotting towers erected in response to the Black Friday bushfires of 1939.
