= Shire of Tambo (Victoria) =

Coordinates: 37°53′S 147°59′E

Shire of Tambo Victoria
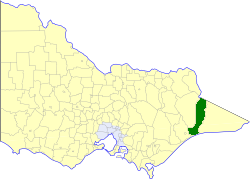
- Location in Victoria
- The Shire of Tambo as at its dissolution in 1994
- Population: 10,720 (1992)
  - Density: 3.0569/km^{2} (7.917/sq mi)
- Established: 1882
- Area: 3,506.86 km^{2} (1,354.0 sq mi)
- Council seat: Lakes Entrance
- Region: East Gippsland
- County: Dargo, Tambo
LGAs around Shire of Tambo:
Upper Murray	Snowy River (NSW)	Bombala (NSW)
Omeo	Shire of Tambo	Orbost
Bairnsdale	Bass Strait	Bass Strait

The Shire of Tambo was a local government area about 320 kilometres (199 mi) east of Melbourne, the state capital of Victoria, Australia. The shire covered an area of 3,506.86 square kilometres (1,354.0 sq mi), and existed from 1882 until 1994.

== History ==
Tambo was first incorporated as a shire on 6 January 1882, splitting away from the Shire of Bairnsdale. On 30 May 1892, it lost three-quarters of its land area when the Shire of Orbost was incorporated. A small amount was re-annexed as Cunninghame Riding on 3 January 1913.

On 2 December 1994, the Shire of Tambo was abolished, and along with the City of Bairnsdale, the Shires of Bairnsdale and Orbost, parts of the Shire of Omeo and the Boole Boole Peninsula from the Shire of Rosedale, was merged into the newly created Shire of East Gippsland.

== Wards ==
The Shire of Tambo was divided into four ridings, each of which elected three councillors:

- Bruthen/Buchan Riding
- Bumberrah Riding
- Coastal Riding
- Cunninghame Riding

== Towns and localities ==
- Bruthen
- Buchan
- Bumberrah
- Claybank
- Gelantipy
- Johnsonville
- Kalimna
- Kalimna West
- Lake Tyers Beach
- Lakes Entrance*
- Metung
- Mossiface
- Murrindal
- Nicholson
- Nowa Nowa
- Nungurner
- Sarsfield
- Swan Reach
- Tambo Upper
- Wulgulmerang

* Council seat.

== Population ==
Year	Population
1954	5,085
1958	5,490*
1961	5,431
1966	5,441
1971	5,888
1976	6,336
1981	7,181
1986	8,941
1991	10,155

* Estimate in the 1958 Victorian Year Book.
