= Parnaby Totems =

Two bushfire awareness totems

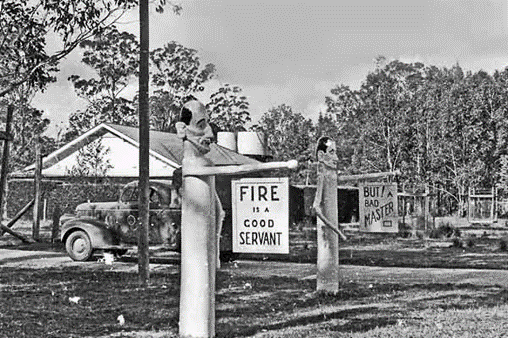
Parnaby Totems outside the Forests Commission Victoria (FCV) Office at Noorinbee - 1951.

Two bushfire awareness totems were carved by forester David Parnaby in about 1951. They sat outside the Noorinbee office of the Forests Commission Victoria (FCV) until the mid-1960s before being moved to a new office at nearby Cann River. The totems were well known tourist icons of the township until they collapsed from rot in the late 1990s. The heads were also thought to be lost until they turned up in 2021 and were used as templates to make replica totems which were reinstated outside the DEECA office in 2023.

== Gippsland’s Carved Wooden Men. ==
Gippsland in eastern Victoria has a rich history of mysterious carved wooden characters across its extensive State forests and roadsides. They include Pons asinorum near Cann River (early 1920s), Alfonso Spaghetti near Orbost (1924), the first Mr Stringy at Dead Horse Gap (1929) followed by the second Mr Stringy (late 1960s), several Fish Faithfull sculptures near Omeo (1930s), the first Parnaby Totems at Noorinbee (1951), through to the more recent Pretty Boy south of Dargo (2016).

Most are gone now, having rotted away, burnt by bushfires, stolen or damaged by vandals, their stories often lost.

Gippsland's most famous surviving wooden man is undoubtedly Mr Stringy who stands stoically at Dead Horse Flat on a lonely stretch of the Great Alpine Road between Bairnsdale and Omeo. In 2024 replacement Parnaby Totems were erected at Cann River.

== Original Parnaby Totems - 1951. ==
David Parnaby graduated from the Victorian School of Forestry (VSF) at Creswick in 1940 and initially worked in the Assessment Branch of the Forests Commission Victoria (FCV).

David later had field postings to Heathcote, Powelltown, Dandenong's, Bruthen and Beechworth Districts before being promoted as District Forester and moving to East Gippsland in 1951.

David was an accomplished artist and cartoonist who provided insightful and humorous commentary through the Victorian State Forester's Association Newsletter.

Around 1951, David carved two large bushfire awareness totem poles from the very durable Gippsland grey box (Eucalyptus bosistoana), which sat outside the FCV's Noorinbee office.

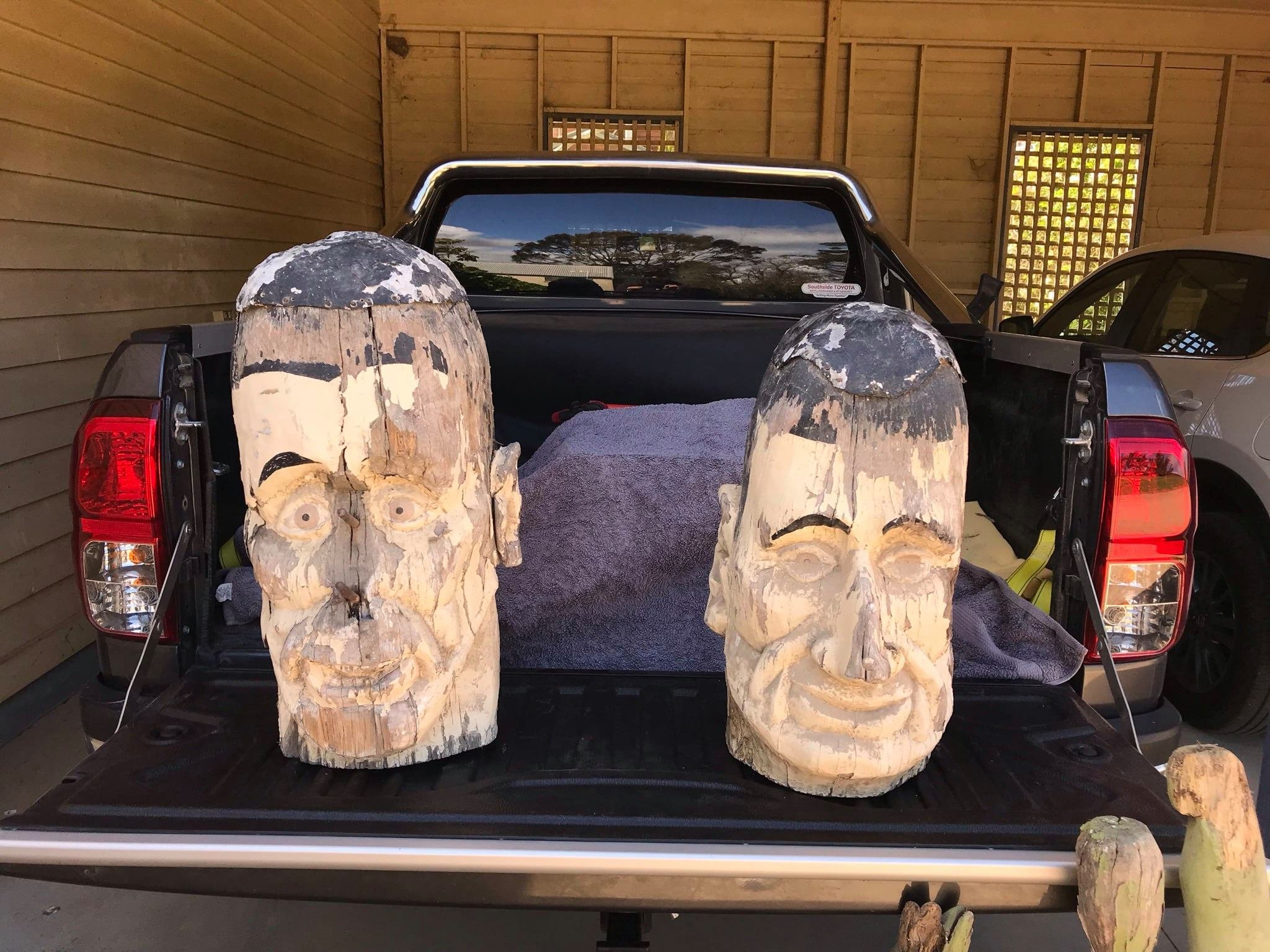
The original Parnaby Totem heads were discovered after 20 years in storage. They were thought to have been lost in the late 1990s.

According to Forests Commission folklore, the totems bore disturbing resemblances to the Minister for Forests (Sir Albert Lind) and the FCV Chairman (Alf Lawrence) so David hurriedly made some changes with his chisel the night before their arrival from Melbourne.

The totems were later shifted to the new Cann River office on the Princes Highway in the mid-1960s where they remained.

The totems were regularly repainted and changed appearance slightly over the years but remained well-known tourist icons of the township.

The totems were finally removed in the late 1990s when the office driveway was realigned, but the timber couldn't be saved from rot, which simply collapsed.

== Replacement Totems - 2023. ==
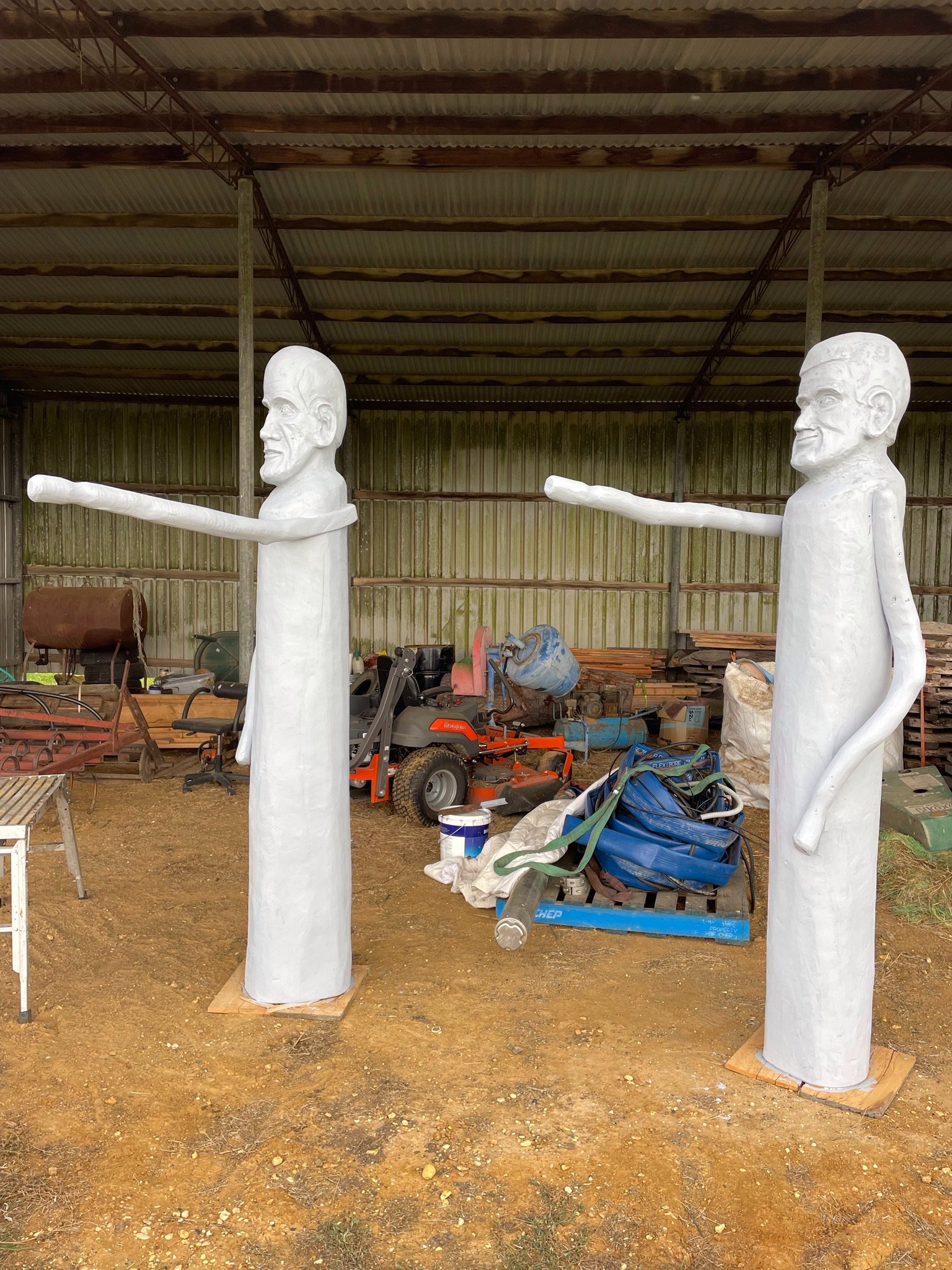
Two totems replicas were carved from cypress pine by John Brady

The original totem heads, which most believed had also been lost, ended up in private hands and sat safely in a shed in Cann River for next two decades until being discovered in October 2021.

With funding from the Department of Energy, Environment and Climate Action (DEECA) the old heads were used templates to make replicas from Cypress Pine in mid-2022 by well-known wood carver John Brady from Fulham near Sale.

The new totems are imposing at over 2m in height and were painted by local staff. They are expected to be finally erected outside the DEECA office on the Princes Highway at Cann River in early 2024.

The original heads carved by David Parnaby will be placed on display in the DEECA office.
