= 2006–07 Eastern Victoria Great Divide bushfires =

Series of bushfires in Victoria, Australia

Eastern Victoria Great Divide bushfires
- Date: 1 December 2006 – 6 February 2007
- Location: Victoria, Australia

Statistics
- Burned area: 1.2 to 1.3 million hectares
- Land use: Forest reserves/national parks, farmland

Impacts
- Deaths: 1
- Injuries: 1400 firefighters
- Structures destroyed: 51 homes

The Eastern Victoria Great Divide bushfires, also known as the Great Divide Complex, were a series of bushfires that commenced in the Victorian Alps in Australia on 1 December 2006 due to lightning strikes, and continued for 69 days. They were the longest running bushfires in the state's history. Between 1.2 and 1.3 million hectares were burnt, most of it public land. Victorian fire personnel were assisted by others from all states and territories of Australia, as well as teams from New Zealand, the United States and Canada.

== Timeline ==
On 11 December it was reported that the fires had reached Mount Stirling, and destroyed Craig's Hut, well known as the setting for the film The Man from Snowy River. The bushfire smoke spread across the state, and by 20 December visibility in Melbourne was reduced to two kilometres, causing disruption to flights at Melbourne Airport. On 11 January a number of buildings and stock were lost at Tambo Crossing as the firefront crossed to the east of the Great Alpine Road and climbed Mount Elizabeth.

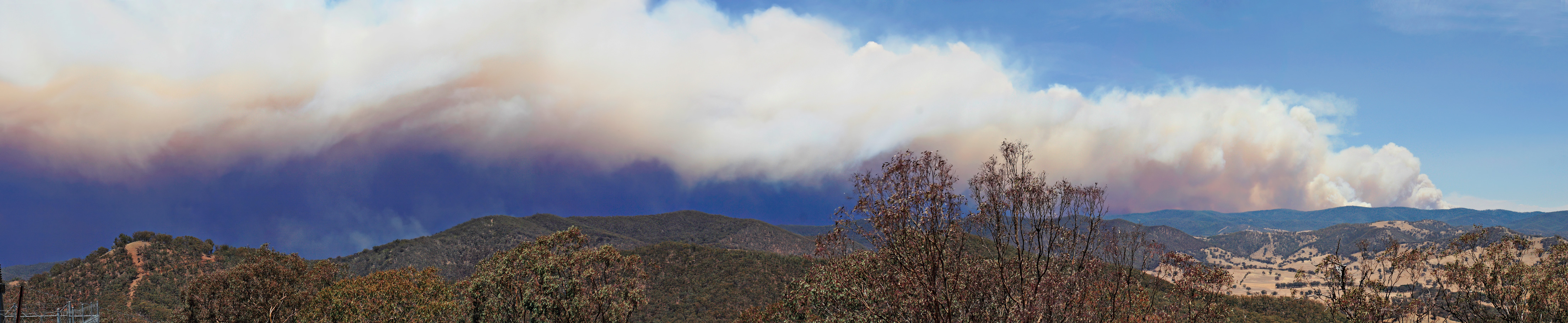
Fire activity near Dargo on 11 January, viewed from Swifts Creek

== Tawonga Gap and Tatong fires ==
Two separate large fires were burning nearby during the same period, one at Tawonga Gap (33,500 hectares) and another at Tatong (33,000 hectares).
