= Doctors Flat, Victoria =

Doctors Flat
- Town
- Coordinates: 37°18′14″S 147°44′41″E
- Country: Australia
- State: Victoria
- LGA: Shire of East Gippsland

Government
  - State electorate: Gippsland East
  - Federal division: Gippsland

Population
  - Total: 13 (2021 census)
- Postcode: 3895

Doctors Flat is a locality in the Shire of East Gippsland, Victoria, Australia. At the 2021 census, Doctors Flat had a population of 13.
