= Haughtons Flat Diversion Tunnel =

Coordinates: 37°35′39″S 147°42′13″E

The Haughtons Flat Diversion Tunnel is a Victorian gold rush diversion tunnel on the Nicholson River in Gippsland, Victoria, Australia. It is located at the southern end of the former Deptford township, approximately 35 km north of Bairnsdale. The tunnel is approximately 50 m long.

The diversion was probably excavated in 1873 by the Nicholson River Sluicing Company. The tunnel was used to divert the waters of the Nicholson River in order to work ground 'hitherto inaccessible to the individual miner'. The site is listed in the Victorian Heritage Register.
