= Nelse =

- Town
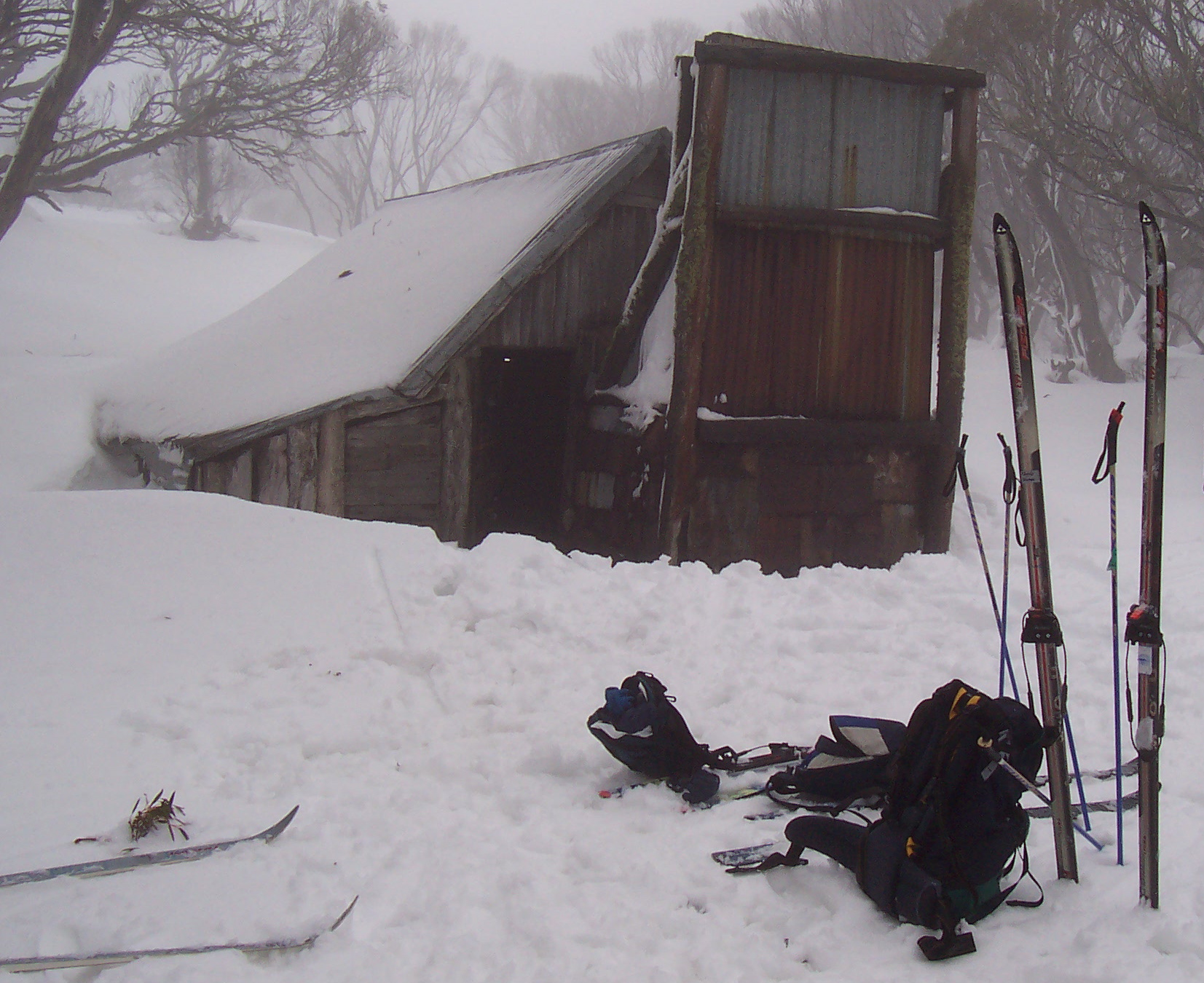
- Wallace's Hut in winter

- Coordinates: 36°49′57″S 147°21′37.08″E
- Country: Australia
- State: Victoria
- LGA(s): Shire of East Gippsland
- Location: 7 km (4.3 mi) NNE of Falls Creek; 35 km (22 mi) SE of Bright; 36 km (22 mi) ESE of Omeo; 107 km (66 mi) ESE of Warangatta

Government
  - State electorate(s): Benambra
  - Federal division(s): Indi

Area
  - Total: 223.097 km^{2} (86.138 sq mi)
- Elevation: 1,893 m (6,211 ft)

Population
  - Total(s): 0 (2021 census)
  - Density: 0.0000/km^{2} (0.000/sq mi)
- Postcode: 3699
- Mean max temp: −2.6 °C (27.3 °F)
- Mean min temp: −1.6 °C (29.1 °F)
- Annual rainfall: 1,264.5 mm (49.78 in)

Nelse is a locality in the Shire of East Gippsland, Victoria, Australia. It is located in the Bogong High Plains. At the 2021 census, Nelse had a population of 0.

== History ==
Nelse was originally a cattle station and is home to a significant historical site – Wallace's Hut. This notable structure, dating back to 1889, is among the oldest surviving huts in the region. It was built in just six weeks by Irish brothers Arthur, William, and Stewart Wallace. Sitting amidst ancient snow gums on a grassy plateau above the snowline, this hut has both historical and architectural significance to the State of Victoria and has been listed on the Victorian Heritage Register (VHR) as a result.

Wallace's Hut is historically important in the context of Nelse and the surrounding Alpine National Park. It was originally built to provide shelter for cattle herders working in the remote and rugged Bogong High Plains. During the 1914-18 drought, the hut had served as a crucial refuge for stockmen from New South Wales and their sheep. While numerous huts were erected in the region throughout that era, they typically had frail structures and were highly susceptible to the weather and bushfires. As a result, no other huts from the nineteenth century have endured as Wallace's Hut has.

Beyond its historical value, the hut also played a role in the early days of hydroelectric power in the State of Victoria. From the late 1920s to the early 1940s, the State Electricity Commission of Victoria (SEC) used it to collect weather data on precipitation, which contributed to the development of hydroelectricity in the state.

Architecturally, Wallace's Hut is a unique example of nineteenth-century construction in Victoria, offering insights into the building methods of the era. While it has evolved over the years due to its use by walkers and skiers, it remains a symbol of the historical and architectural heritage of the Nelse area.
