= Mossiface =

- Town
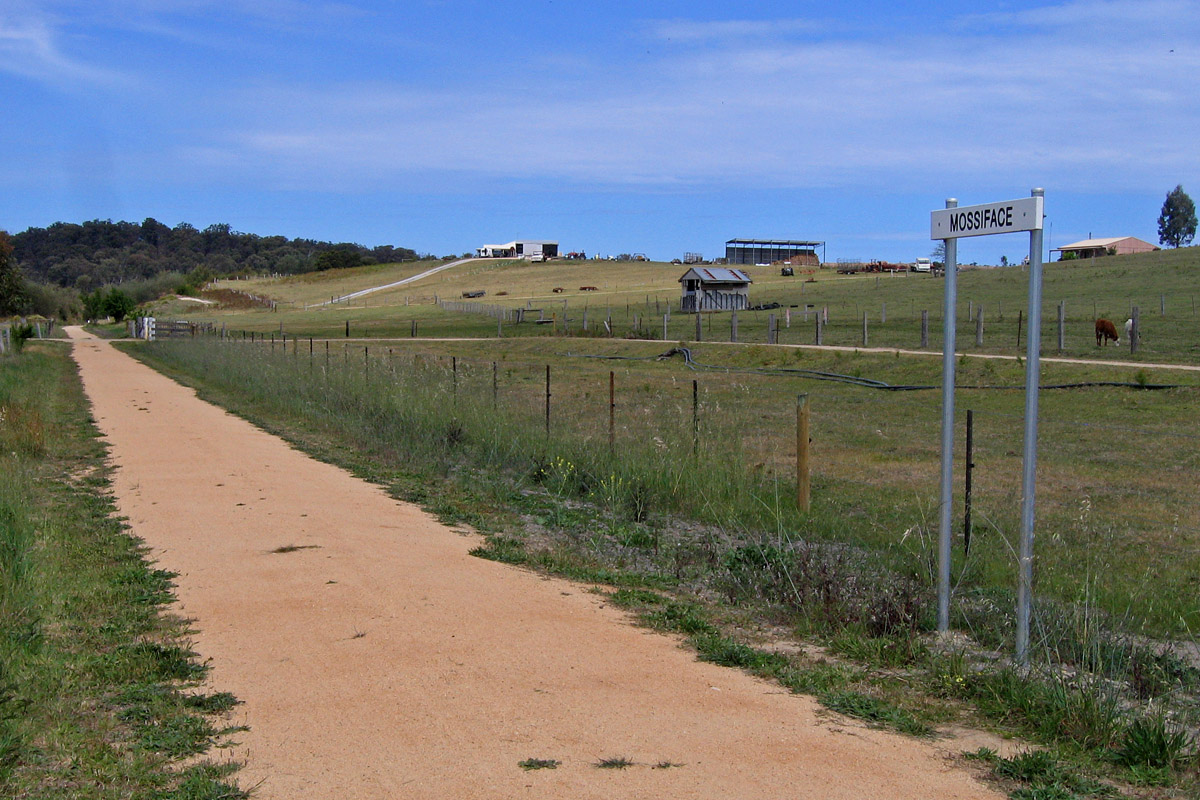
- Site of the former Mossiface Railway Station

- Coordinates: 37°44′09″S 147°48′44″E
- Country: Australia
- State: Victoria
- LGA: Shire of East Gippsland

Government
  - State electorate: Gippsland East
  - Federal division: Gippsland

Population
  - Total: 138 (2021 census)
- Postcode: 3885

Mossiface is a locality in the Shire of East Gippsland, Victoria, Australia. At the 2021 census, Mossiface had a population of 138. The Mossiface railway station is located in Mossiface.
