= Metung =

- Town
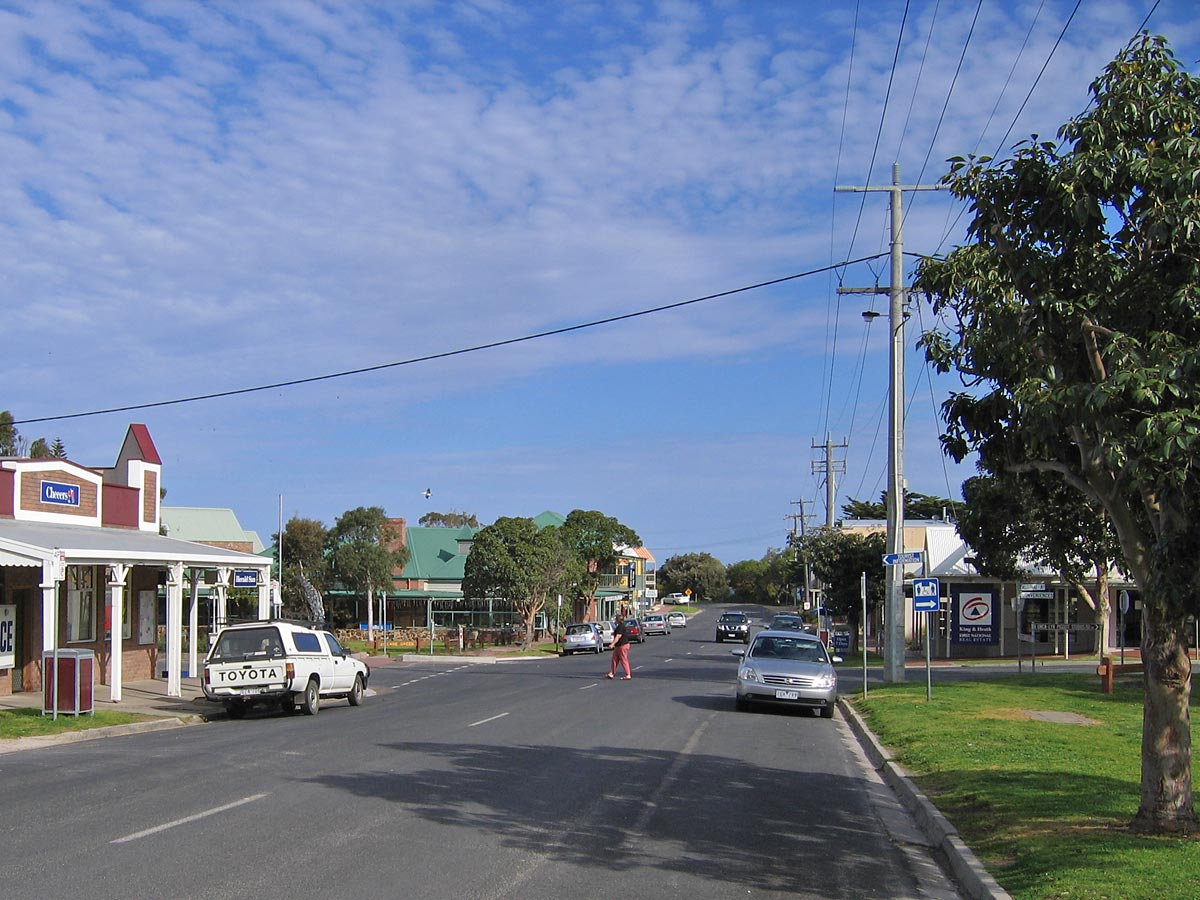
- Town centre on Metung Rd

- Interactive map of Metung
- Coordinates: 37°53′0″S 147°51′0″E
- Country: Australia
- State: Victoria
- LGA: Shire of East Gippsland
- Location: 314 km (195 mi) E of Melbourne; 31 km (19 mi) SE of Bairnsdale; 20 km (12 mi) W of Lakes Entrance

Government
  - State electorate: Gippsland East
  - Federal division: Gippsland

Population
  - Total: 1,449 (2016 census)
- Postcode: 3904
- Mean max temp: 19.2 °C (66.6 °F)
- Mean min temp: 10.3 °C (50.5 °F)
- Annual rainfall: 731.7 mm (28.81 in)

Metung is a town in East Gippsland region of Victoria, Australia. The town is 314 kilometres (195 mi) east of the state capital Melbourne and between the larger towns of Bairnsdale and Lakes Entrance. It is on a small peninsula 31 kilometres (19 mi) south-east of Bairnsdale, separating Lake King and Bancroft Bay on the Gippsland Lakes.

Metung is a popular holiday spot, near to larger towns but off any main routes itself. Many of the permanent inhabitants commute to work at Bairnsdale or Lakes Entrance.

Golfers play at the course of the Kings Cove Metung Golf Club on Kings Cove Boulevard.

== History ==
Metung Post Office opened on 2 June 1879.

A sanitorium named 'Iona', was established by G.A. Stow in the early 1880s opposite the Rosherville Hotel, originally known as 'Stow's Sportsman's Home', or 'Stow's'. Stow attempted to rename 'Mosquito Point' to 'Point Normandby' with a view to attracting visitors. It was later owned by H. Teychenne.

== Legend Rock ==
The original inhabitants of the area—the Aboriginal Gunai or Kurnai people—tell a story about an unusual group of rocks now found alongside the boardwalk in the Metung Marina on Bancroft Bay. This legend or fable indicates how greed will be punished.

The legend goes that some fishermen made a good catch and ate the fish around their campfire. The fishermen, however, did not share their catch with their dogs, despite having more than enough to eat. As a punishment, the women, who were guardians of social law, turned the greedy men to stone.

Originally there were three rocks found at this location that related to the legend, but two of them were destroyed during road works. The remaining Legend Rock is now protected.

== Gallery ==
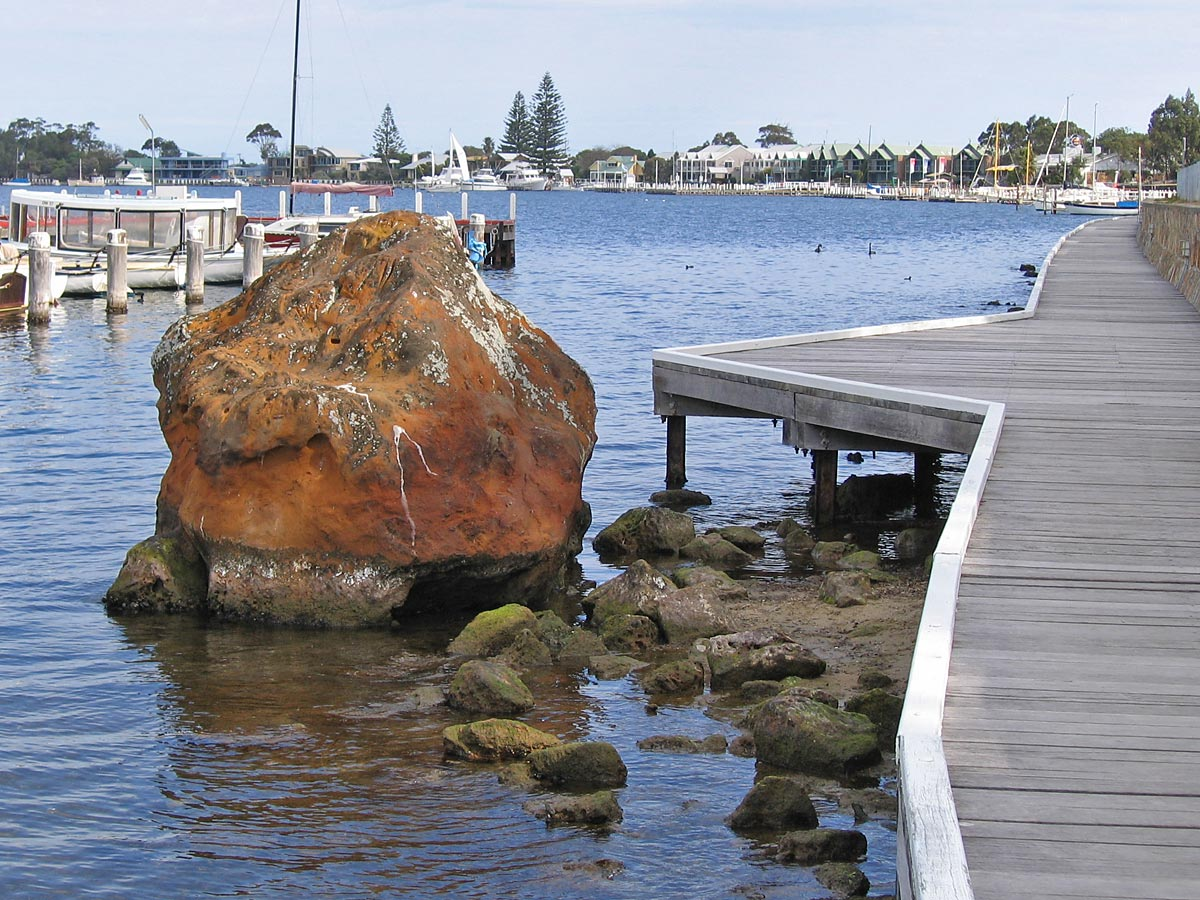
The remaining Legend Rock in the marina

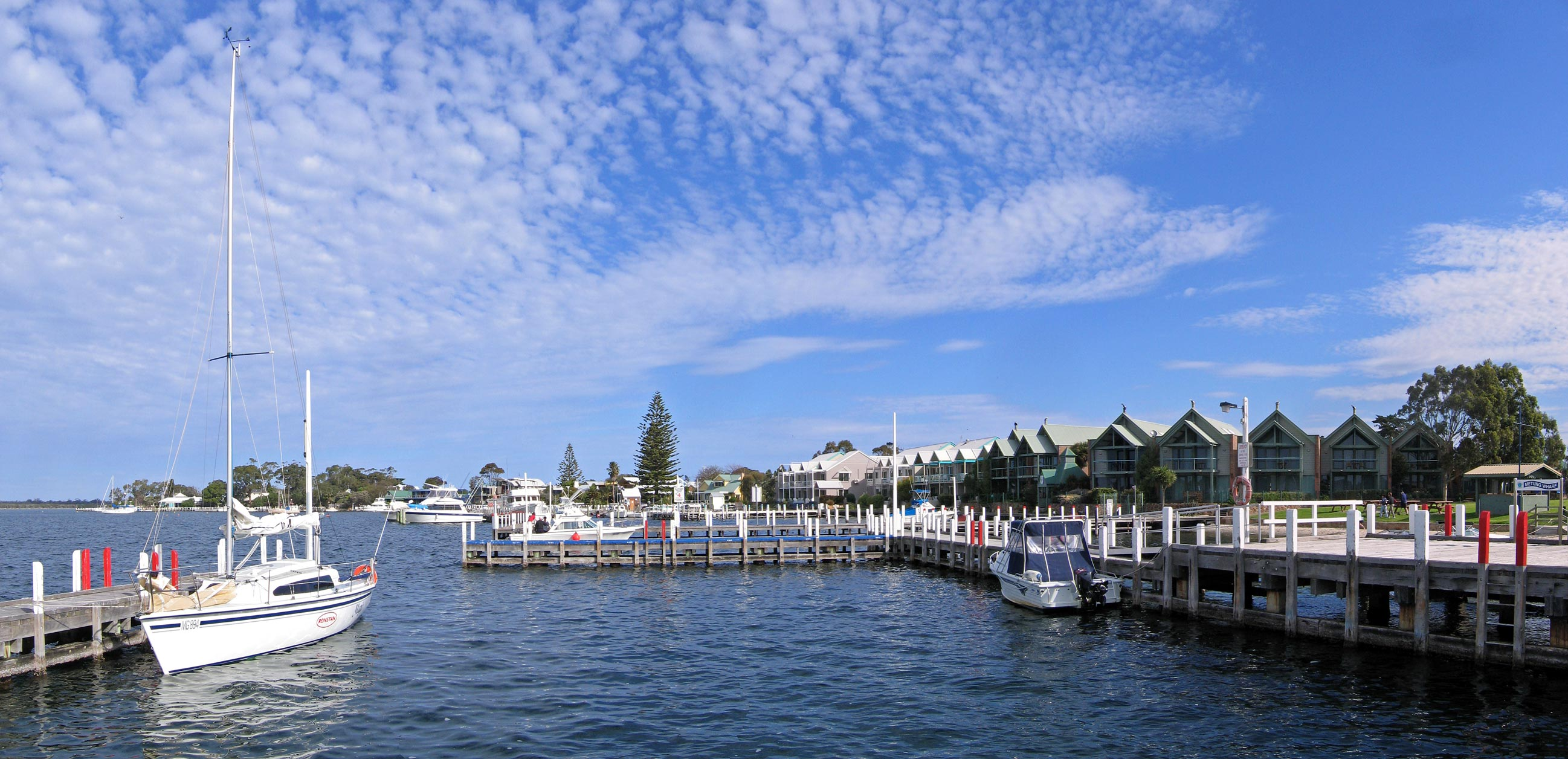
Metung Wharf on Bancroft Bay
