= Double Bridges, Victoria =

Double Bridges Victoria
- Coordinates: 37°35′2″S 147°53′42″E
- Population: 0 (2016 census)
- Postcode(s): 3893
- LGA(s): Shire of East Gippsland
- State electorate(s): Gippsland East
- Federal division(s): Gippsland

Double Bridges is a locality in the Shire of East Gippsland of Victoria, Australia.
