= Tongio =

- Town
- Coordinates: 37.1876°S 147.7254°E
- Country: Australia
- State: Victoria
- LGA: Shire of East Gippsland
- Location: 232 km (144 mi) E of Melbourne; 14.79 km (9.19 mi) SE of Omeo

Government
  - State electorate: Gippsland East
  - Federal division: Gippsland

Population
  - Total: 50 (2021 census)
- Postcode: 3896

Tongio is a locality in Victoria, Australia. It is located on the Great Alpine Road, south of Omeo. At the 2021 census, Tongio recorded a population of 50.

== History ==
Tongio's namesake is the Aboriginal Tongio Munjie, and the town was first settled in 1839 by Codie Buckley. While there is no record of when the Tongio hotel was built, the earliest license was granted on 17 November 1884 to Jack Weston.

== Demographics ==
As of the 2021 Australian census, 50 people resided in Tongio. The median age of persons in Tongio was 57 years. There were more males than females, with 52.0% of the population male and 48.0% female. The average household size was 1.9 people per household.
