= Wy Yung =

- Town
- Coordinates: 37°47′0″S 147°41′0″E
- Country: Australia
- State: Victoria
- LGA: Shire of East Gippsland
- Location: 287 km (178 mi) E of Melbourne; 5 km (3.1 mi) W of Bairnsdale

Government
  - State electorate: Gippsland East
  - Federal division: Gippsland

Population
  - Total: 1,940 (SAL 2021)
- Postcode: 3875

Wy Yung is a town in Victoria, Australia, located on Great Alpine Road, in the Shire of East Gippsland near Bairnsdale. The town's name means wild duck in the local Indigenous language.

White settlers moved to the district in the 1860s and by the next decade there was enough population for two schools and a hotel to be opened in the 1870s, it remained a farming district until the 1970s when demand for urban housing began.

== Mitchell River ==
The Mitchell River flows into Lake King and Jones Bay at Eagle Point Bluff. The Mitchell, Tambo and Nicholson rivers deliver a combined discharge of 1.1 gigalitres per year into the lakes system. The Strategic Management Plan quotes that about 100,000 tonnes of suspended solids (excluding bottom sediments) are estimated to enter the Gippsland Lakes each year from the catchments of the Mitchell, Tambo and Nicholson rivers alone. Sediment loads from the western catchments (discharging to Lake Wellington) deliver two to three times the nutrient and sediment loads than from the eastern catchments (Mitchell, Nicholson and Tambo rivers). Comparison of aerial photographs spanning 1935 to 1997 demonstrate that the vast majority of shorelines are eroding at an average of less than 10 cm per year.

The lower reaches of the Latrobe River, Thomson River and Mitchell River flow into the Gippsland Lakes and have extensive floodplains in which there are large wetlands, often separated by natural levees from the main river channels.

The Mitchell river flats were always prone to flooding and 1891 bore witness to the flood that was only second in extent to the great floods of 1870. The biggest floods recorded were in 1893–94 with them being 76 mm higher than the 1870 water levels. All floods caused the township great suffering with loss of life, infrastructure and crops. The flooding that occurred in the 1893–94 was notable for the gallantry of Patrick Piggott and George Brooks who both worked to rescue people. However, on their last trip their boat tipped as they moored it and both men were swept into the river and drowned. A witness remonstrated that; "…to the very last, they fought bravely for their lives against fearful odds". Both men are remembered upon a marble tablet installed at the Mechanics' Hall (The Bairnsdale Library).

The Mitchell Delta is represented as a type-L under the Ramsar wetland type classification framework, which means that it is a permanent inland delta. The Mitchell Delta is a classic form of digitate delta (from Latin digitātus, having finger or toes and is located near the western shoreline of Lake King at Eagle Point Bluff, extending into the lake as silt jetties formed by alluvial deposition of sediment. The Mitchell Delta represents one of the finest examples of this type of landform in the world and is a site deemed of international geomorphological significance and is one of the finest examples of a classic digitate delta in the world.

== Football ==
The town has an Australian Rules football team competing in the East Gippsland Football League. One of the founding clubs of the league in 1974, they are known as the Tigers. They have been premiers three times, 1992, 2003, & 2015.
