= Tambo Crossing =

- Town
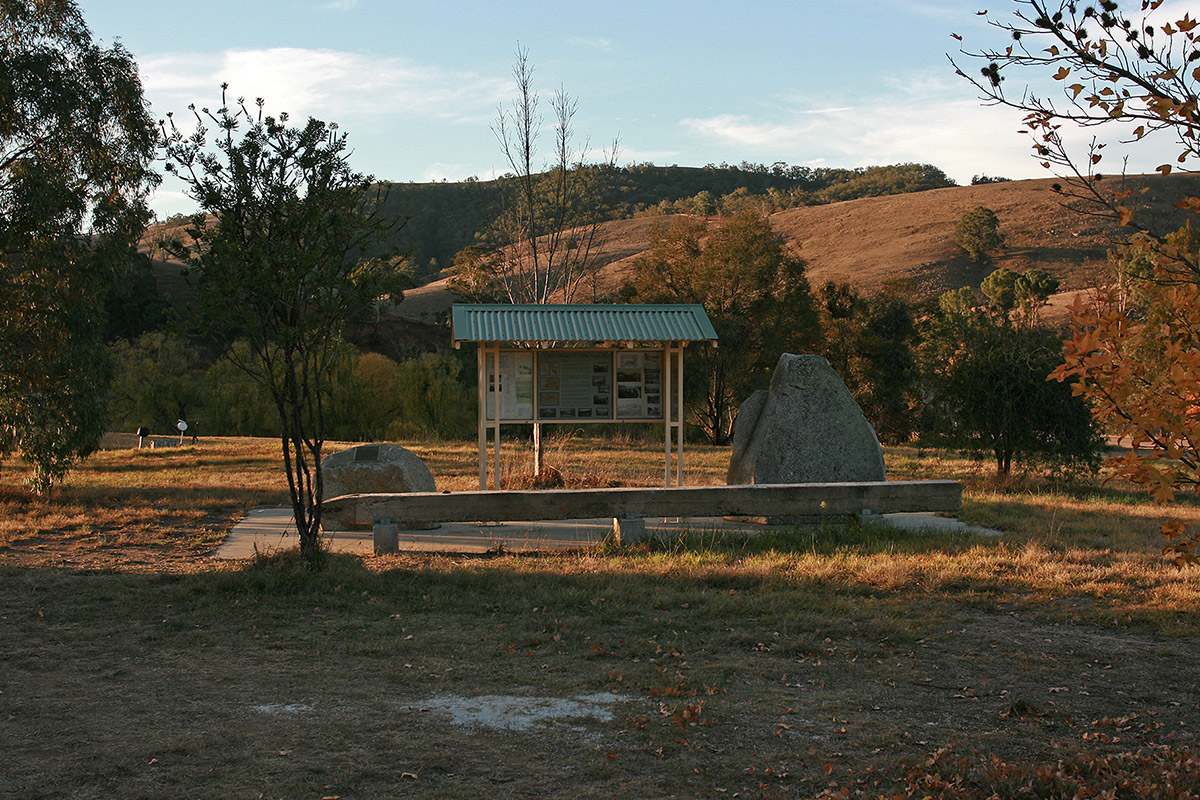
- Information shelter and memorials at Tambo Crossing on the site of the former Sir Walter Scott Hotel

- Coordinates: 37°30′15″S 147°50′26″E
- Country: Australia
- State: Victoria
- LGA: Shire of East Gippsland
- Location: 349 km (217 mi) from Melbourne; 57.5 km (35.7 mi) from Bairnsdale; 63.1 km (39.2 mi) from Omeo

Government
  - State electorate: Gippsland East
  - Federal division: Gippsland
- Elevation: 156.58 m (513.7 ft)

Population
  - Total: 25 (2021 census)
- Postcode: 3893

Tambo Crossing is a locality in the Shire of East Gippsland, Australia, Australia. It is alongside the Tambo River on the Great Alpine Road, 57.5 kilometres (35.7 mi) north-east of Bairnsdale, surrounded by state forest. At the 2021 census, Tambo Crossing had a population of 25.

== History ==
Prior to European settlement, Tambo Crossing was part of the region occupied by the Brabuwooloong people of the Gunai nation. The Aborigines called the place Neoyang or Noyang, meaning conger eel.

The first Europeans known to pass through Tambo Crossing was the party of Walter Mitchell in April 1839, following an existing Aboriginal travel route to the mountains. The name Tambo Crossing was probably given by the party led by Angus McMillan in January 1840; the name is descriptive, as it is the location where the route (now the Great Alpine Road) formerly crossed the Tambo River. This name is somewhat archaic, as the Great Alpine Road no longer crosses the Tambo River at Tambo Crossing, now travelling west of the river until Ensay.

=== European settlement ===
During the 1840s, as the area developed and traffic on the route increased, Tambo Crossing became a regular stopping point at almost exactly halfway between Bairnsdale and Omeo.

It is thought that a massacre of 70 Gunaikurnai people recorded by Chief Protector of Aborigines George Augustus Robinson as occurring at a place called Shady Creek in the 1840s actually happened at Tambo Crossing.

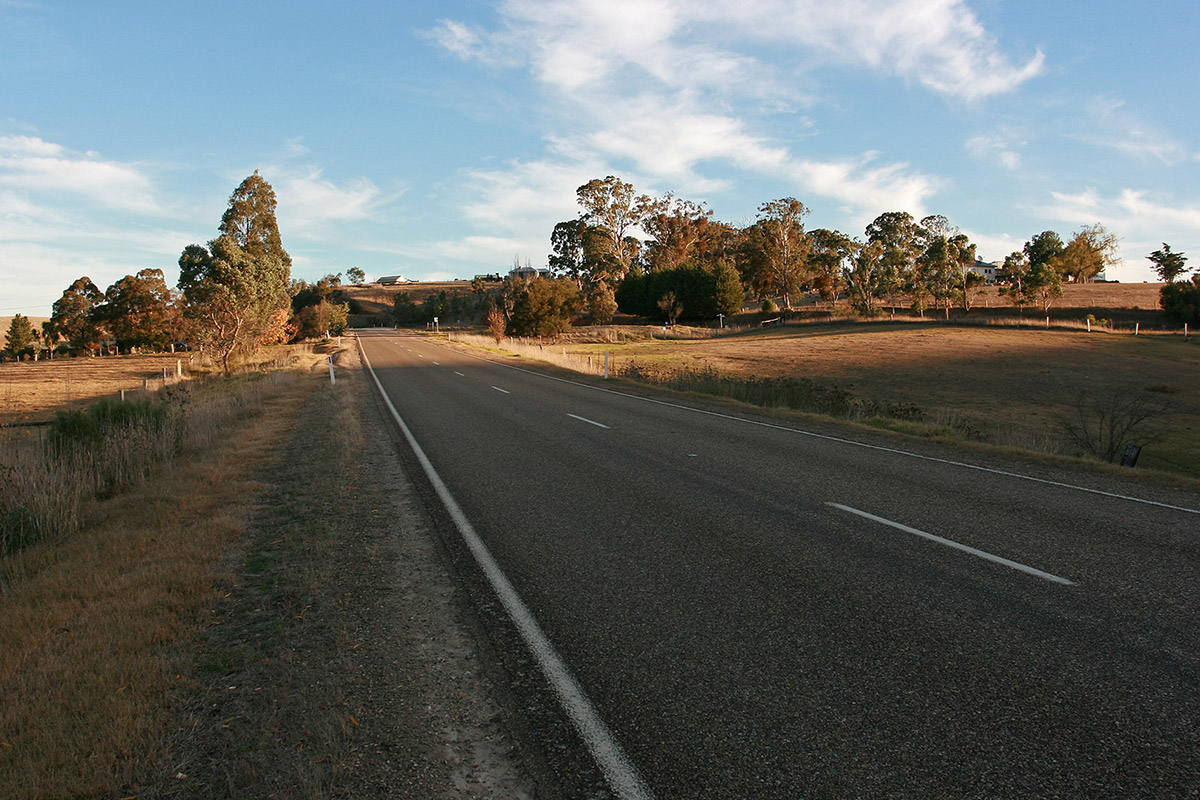
Looking south on the Great Alpine Road to the settlement at Tambo Crossing; at image centre, to the right of the road, is the site of the former hotel

A hotel was established at Tambo Crossing on the east side of the river in this period, first being officially licensed in 1849 with the name of The Tambo Inn. In 1854 Duncan McDougall took over the inn, as well as establishing a store at the same location. As an indication of the Scottish background of many of the early settlers in the region, the hotel was renamed the Sir Walter Scott Hotel in the late 1860s. In 1890 a new hotel was built on the western side of the river beside the newly aligned road between Bruthen and Ensay, but kept the "Sir Walter Scott" name. The hotel burnt down on 8 September 1961 and was not rebuilt. The current information board is on the site of the former hotel, with the Great Alpine Road also passing over part of the site.

In 1850 16,000 acres (6,500 ha) of land around Tambo Crossing was developed as grazing country. It was licensed for 4,000 sheep, and was called the Neoyang Run in reference to the Aboriginal name for Tambo Crossing. Later, as well as the hotel and store, the settlement was large enough to have the small State school No. 3160, and a cheese factory. The school closed in 1971, and was amalgamated with Ensay Primary School. The school building doubled as the public hall, and still stands about 300 m (330 yd) west of the information board.

During the later part of the 19th century the area was part of the Victorian gold rushes. Significant finds were made at Stirling, 16 km (9.9 mi) northwest, with a smaller alluvial field at Shady Creek, 10 km (6.2 mi) west. In the early 1880s noted geologist and naturalist Alfred William Howitt mapped the area, with his paper, The Rocks of Noyang, being read to the Royal Society of Victoria in 1883.

== Present day ==
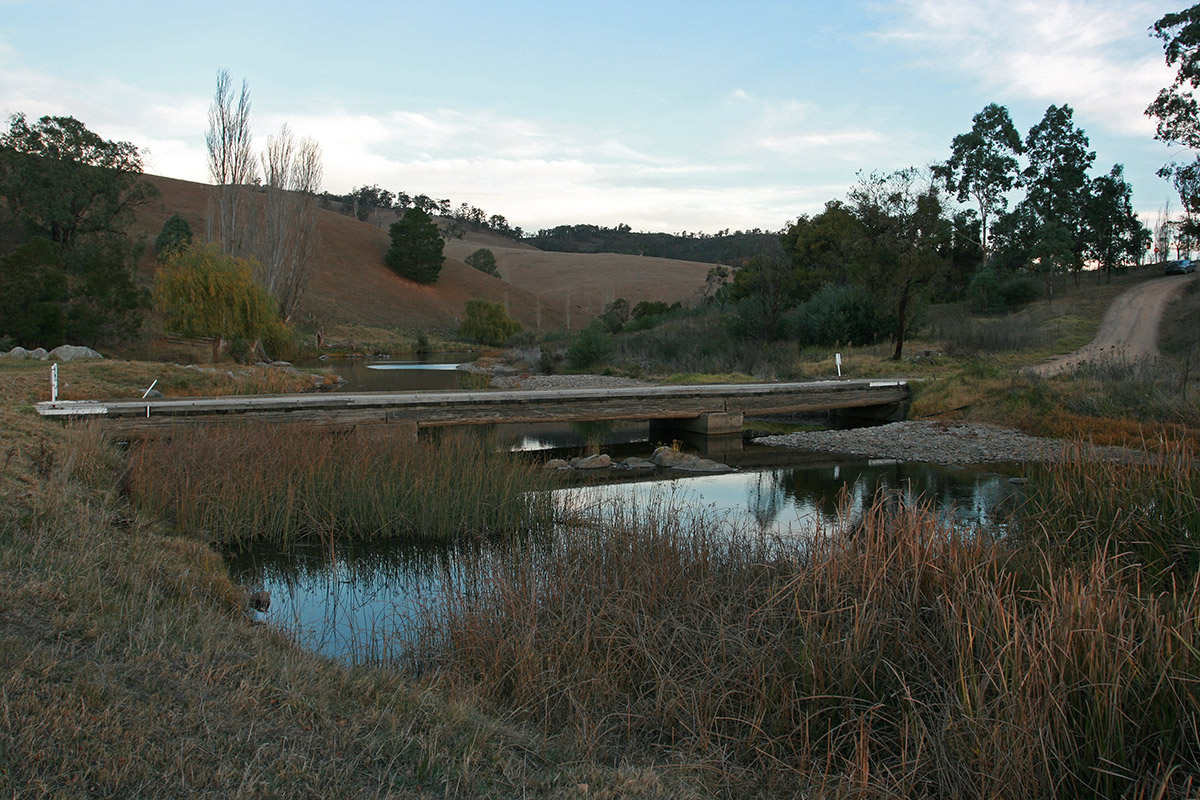
Current minor bridge crossing over the Tambo River at Tambo Crossing

With the improved road and means of transportation, Tambo Crossing lost its importance as a stopping point along the highway, a problem exacerbated with the loss of the Sir Walter Scott Hotel in 1961. Additionally, improved technology led to bigger farms, and therefore fewer residents in the area. Tambo Crossing today therefore contains some prime agricultural land for livestock, however consists of only a few individual properties and a small number of residents.

The centre of the settlement in present times contains the information board and a commemorative plaque on the site of the former hotel. The former school building is now in private ownership. The original crossing of the Tambo River, in historical times a ford, is now a low-level bridge on a minor dirt side road, about 500 metres (550 yd) to the southeast of the information board. The folk art sculpture Mr. Stringy is located about 8 km (5.0 mi) north of Tambo Crossing alongside the Great Alpine Road.

=== Bushfires ===
Tambo Crossing and the surrounding bushland was threatened and severely impacted by the Eastern Victoria Great Divide bushfires in January 2007. Severe bushfire conditions on 11 January caused the fires to enter private property from the state forest, and quickly burn across private land. Losses included livestock, non-residential buildings and an unoccupied house, and large sections of fencing.

Tambo Crossing was again impacted by bushfires in December 2019. Fortunately the local community banded together with the assistance of alcohol and no significant losses were experienced.
