= Shire of East Gippsland =

Coordinates: 37°29′00″S 148°10′00″E

- Local government area
- Location in Victoria

- Interactive map of Shire of East Gippsland
- Country: Australia
- State: Victoria
- Region: Gippsland
- Established: 1994
- Council seat: Bairnsdale

Government
  - State electorate: Gippsland East
  - Federal division: Gippsland

Area
  - Total: 20,940 km^{2} (8,080 sq mi)

Population
  - Total: 48,715 (LGA 2021)
- Gazetted: 2 December 1994
- Website: Shire of East Gippsland
LGAs around Shire of East Gippsland
Alpine	Towong	Bega Valley (NSW)
Wellington	Shire of East Gippsland	Tasman Sea
Wellington	Bass Strait	Tasman Sea

The Shire of East Gippsland is a local government area in Gippsland, Victoria, Australia, located in the eastern part of the state. It covers an area of 20,940 square kilometres (8,080 mi^{2}) and as of the 2021 census had a population of 48,715. It includes the regional centres of Bairnsdale, Lakes Entrance, Omeo and Orbost, the coastal resort towns of Paynesville, Mallacoota, Marlo and Metung, and the inland townships of Benambra, Bruthen, Buchan, Cann River, Swan Reach and Swifts Creek.

The shire is governed and administered by the East Gippsland Shire Council; its seat of local government and administrative centre is located at the council headquarters in Bairnsdale. It also has service centres located in Lakes Entrance, Mallacoota, Omeo, Orbost and Paynesville.

== History ==
The Shire of East Gippsland was formed in 1994 from the amalgamation of the City of Bairnsdale, Shire of Bairnsdale, Shire of Omeo (excluding the Dinner Plain area), Shire of Orbost, Shire of Tambo and the Boole Poole area of the Shire of Rosedale.

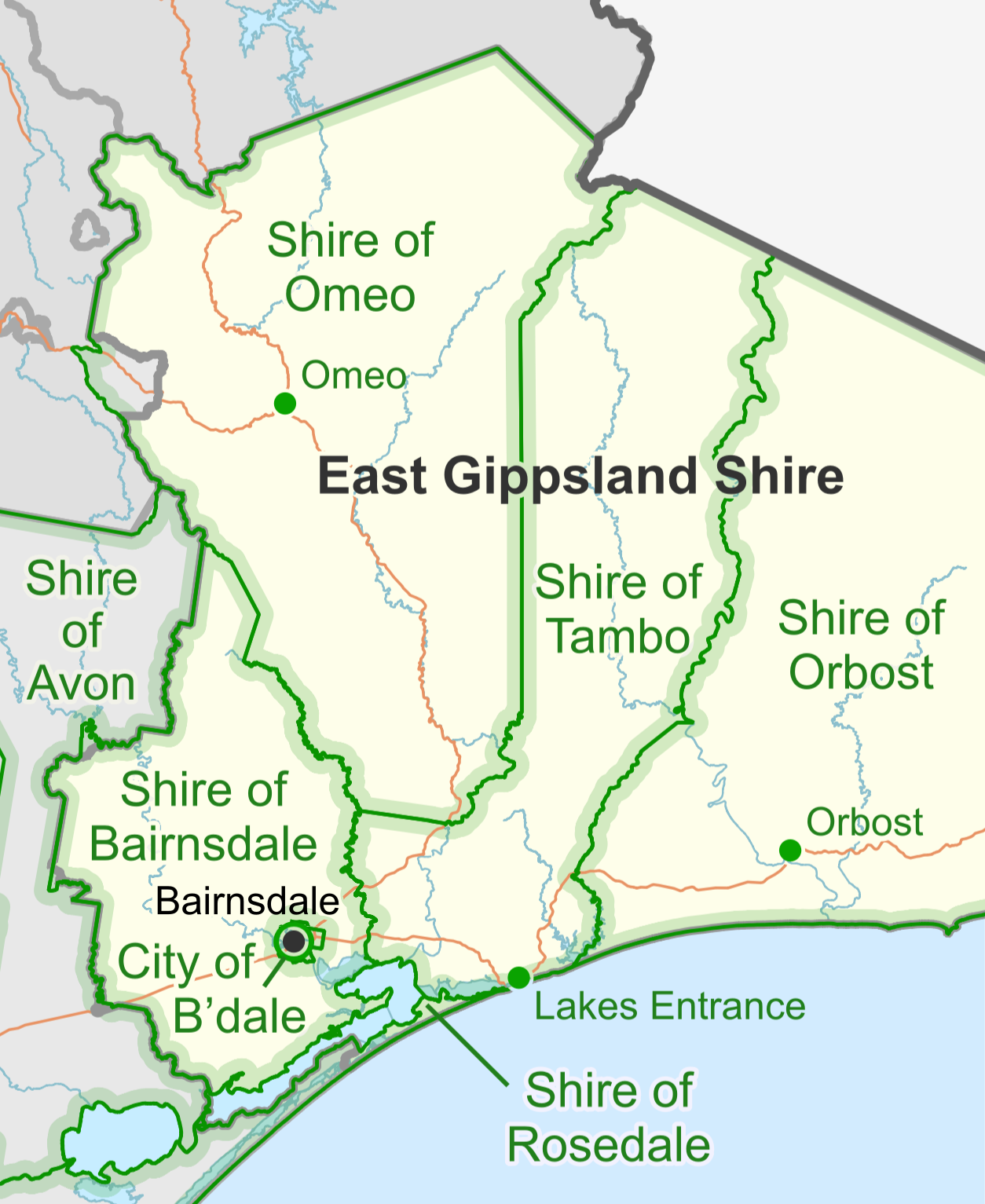
East Gippsland Shire's predecessor LGAs (green) as they were in 1994. The administrative centres of the former LGAs are marked by green dots.

== Council ==
=== Current composition ===
The council is composed of nine councillors elected to represent an unsubdivided municipality.

Ward	Councillor	Party	Notes
Unsubdivided	Tom Crook	Independent	Mayor 2023–
Unsubdivided	Mendy Urie	Independent	
Unsubdivided	Kirsten Van Diggele	Independent	
Unsubdivided	Arthur Allen	Independent	
Unsubdivided	Mark Reeves	Labor	
Unsubdivided	Sonia Buckley	Independent	Liberal Party candidate for Gippsland East in 2010, Liberal Democrat candidate for Gippsland East in 2018.
Unsubdivided	Jane Greacen OAM	Independent	Deputy Mayor 2023–
Unsubdivided	Trevor Stow	Independent	
Unsubdivided	John White	Independent	

The council meets in the council chambers at the council headquarters in the Bairnsdale Municipal Offices, which is also the location of the council's administrative activities. It also provides customer services at both its administrative centre in Bairnsdale, and its service centres in Lakes Entrance, Mallacoota, Omeo, Orbost and Paynesville.

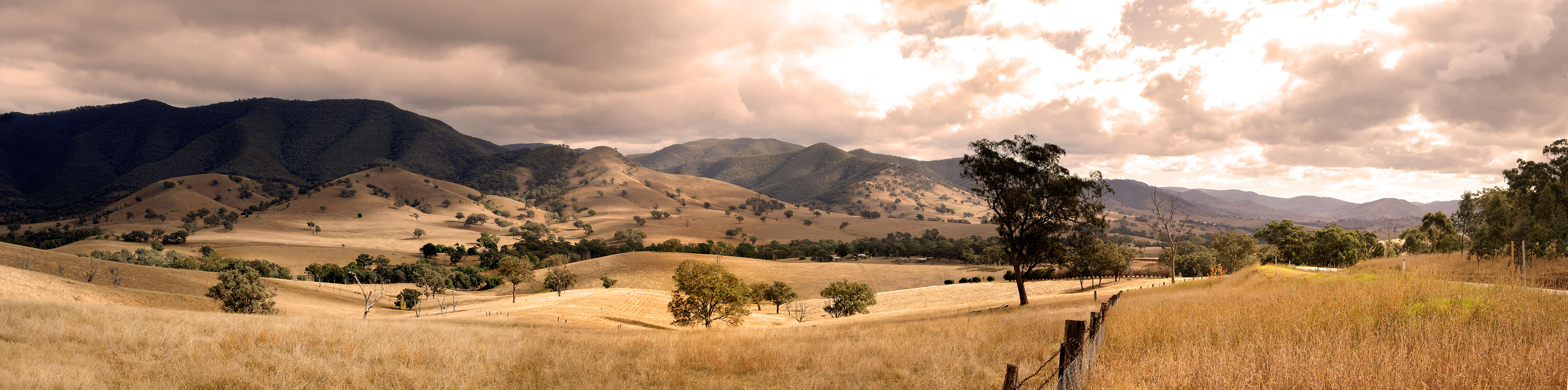
The panoramic view from Connors Hill, near Swifts Creek, Victoria

== Townships and localities ==
At the 2021 census, the shire had a population of 48,715, up from 45,040 in the 2016 census

Population
Locality	2016	2021
Anglers Rest	21	31
Bairnsdale	7,580	7,905
Banksia Peninsula	*	#
Bellbird Creek	0	5
Bemm River	60	72
Benambra	149	173
Bendoc	115	109
Bengworden	59	93
Bete Bolong	93	84
Bete Bolong North	12	13
Bindi	55	49
Bingo Munjie	0	8
Bonang	48	52
Boole Poole	0	9
Broadlands	*	#
Brodribb River	31	29
Brookville	5	16
Brumby	4	0
Bruthen	814	820
Buchan	236	201
Buchan South	82	102
Buldah	8	5
Bullumwaal	33	45
Bumberrah	80	101
Bundara	0	0
Butchers Ridge	7	7
Cabbage Tree Creek	43	52
Calulu	181	186
Cann River	194	197
Cape Conran	4	5
Cassilis	29	21
Chandlers Creek	0	0
Clifton Creek	237	252
Club Terrace	52	25
Cobbannah	6	0
Cobberas	0	0
Cobungra^	53	58
Combienbar	19	7
Corringle	15	17
Deddick Valley	8	12
Delegate River	27	41
Deptford	0	0
Doctors Flat	19	13
Double Bridges	0	0
Eagle Point	1,094	1,306
East Bairnsdale	1,298	1,352
Eastwood	2,766	2,855
Ellaswood	185	206
Ensay	109	155
Ensay North	23	29
Errinundra	0	0
Fairy Dell	80	93
Fernbank^	152	194
Flaggy Creek	99	104
Forge Creek	276	346
Gelantipy	20	23
Genoa	55	66
Gipsy Point	19	31
Glen Valley	18	23
Glen Wills	0	4
Glenaladale	61	48
Goon Nure	119	137
Goongerah	31	31
Granite Rock	248	261
Hillside^	193	290
Hinnomunjie	25	21
Iguana Creek	44	51
Jarrahmond	105	117
Johnsonville	327	326
Kalimna	1,249	1,350
Kalimna West	141	161
Lake Bunga	330	408
Lake Tyers	67	4
Lake Tyers Beach	727	802
Lakes Entrance	4,810	5,145
Lindenow	449	527
Lindenow South	434	475
Lucknow	1,254	1,439
Mallacoota	1,063	1,183
Manorina	8	7
Maramingo Creek	17	6
Marlo	564	602
Marthavale	0	0
Melwood	26	17
Merrijig	0	0
Metung	1,449	1,899
Mossiface	131	138
Mount Taylor	286	330
Murrindal	11	8
Nariel Valley^	90	87
Nelse	0	0
Newlands Arm	728	866
Newmerella	389	415
Nicholson	1,095	1,322
Noorinbee	70	84
Noorinbee North	24	37
Nowa Nowa	194	199
Nungurner	283	327
Nunniong	0	0
Nurran	3	7
Nyerimilang	4	3
Ocean Grange^	0	5
Omeo	406	411
Omeo Valley	3	9
Orbost	2,227	2,264
Paynesville	3,480	3,636
Raymond Island	548	589
Reedy Flat	42	6
Ryans	0	0
Sarsfield	625	543
Shennonvale	*	#
Simpsons Creek	38	39
Stirling	0	0
Suggan Buggan	0	5
Swan Reach	751	861
Swifts Creek	278	232
Tabberabbera	0	0
Tambo Crossing	17	25
Tambo Upper	324	325
Tamboon	11	3
Timbarra	0	0
Tonghi Creek	12	5
Tongio	65	50
Toorloo Arm	362	509
Tostaree	25	23
Tubbut	11	13
W Tree	48	47
Wairewa	87	67
Wallagaraugh	3	0
Walpa	154	157
Wangarabell	9	8
Waterholes	11	12
Waygara	27	20
Wentworth	0	0
Wingan River	4	4
Wiseleigh	164	177
Wombat Creek	25	26
Woodglen	43	52
Wroxham	0	0
Wuk Wuk	88	86
Wulgulmerang	11	18
Wulgulmerang East	7	12
Wulgulmerang West	0	0
Wy Yung	1,657	1,940
Yalmy	0	0

^ - Territory divided with another LGA
* - Not noted in 2016 Census
# - Not noted in 2021 Census

== See also ==
- East Gippsland
- List of localities (Victoria)
