= List of Australian bushfire seasons =

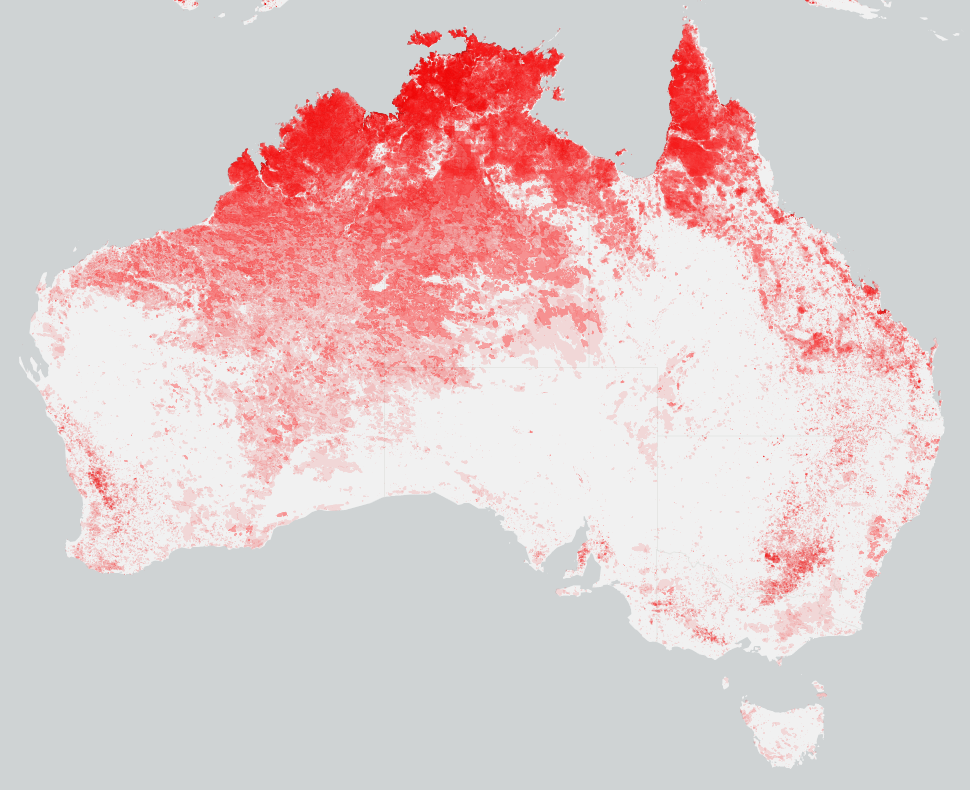
NASA MODIS burned area detections from June 2001 to May 2019 showing regions affected by fires in Australia in red

This is a list of specific seasons of bushfires in Australia including some significant bushfire events from each season. Events are listed if they cause fatalities, destroy houses, or burn more than 100,000 hectares (250,000 acres) of land. Across Australia, seasonality of bushfires varies significantly; however, is generally aligned with the weather patterns in the south of the continent so that each season begins in June (the beginning of the Australian winter) and runs through the following May (the end of the Australian autumn). The worst season recorded is 1974-75, with 117 million hectares (290 million acres) burned, equivalent to 15 percent of Australia's physical land mass that equates to the entire area of France, Spain, and Portugal combined.

== 1800s ==
- 1897–98 Australian bushfire season:

- Red Tuesday: 12 fatalities, 2000 buildings were destroyed, and 260,000 hectares (640,000 acres) were burnt in Victoria (DSE 2003b).

- 1885–86 Australian bushfire season:

- Heytesbury fires

- 1850–51 Australian bushfire season:

- Black Thursday bushfires: 12 fatalities, one million sheep and thousands of cattle were killed, and the fire burnt the second largest area (approximately 5,000,000 hectares (12,000,000 acres)) in history (CFA 2003a; DSE 2003b).

== 1920s ==
- 1925–26 Victorian bushfire season

== 1930s ==
- 1938–1939 Black Friday bushfires

- Adelaide Hills bushfires

== 1940s ==
- 1943–44 Australian bushfire season
- 1943–44 Victorian bushfire season

== 1950s ==
- 1957–58 Australian bushfire season

- Wandilo Bushfire

- 1954–55 Australian bushfire season

- Black Sunday bushfires

== 1960s ==
- 1968–69 Australian bushfire season: NSW in 1968-69 over 1,000,000 hectares (2,500,000 acres) were burnt and three people were killed (Linacre & Hobbs 1977; RFS 2003a).
- 1966–67 Australian bushfire season: 62 fatalities, 900 injured, 7,000 left homeless, 4,286 buildings lost

- The 1967 Tasmanian fires: 110 separate fire fronts burnt through 264,000 hectares (650,000 acres) of land in southern Tasmania. The destruction included 1,293 homes, around 62,000 farm animals, over 1,700 other buildings, 80 bridges, 4,800 sections of power lines, 1,500 motor vehicles and over 100 other structures.

- 1965 New South Wales bushfires. The Chatsbury-Bungonia bushfires destroyed much of the villages of Towrang, Tallong, Wingello, and Penrose, orchards, and livestock, affecting 250,000 hectares (620,000 acres). It broke out in the Southern Highlands and spread toward Nowra. Three people died.
- 1964–65 Australian bushfire season

- Chatsbury bushfires

- 1961 Western Australian bushfires The towns of Dwellingup and Karridale were basically destroyed, along with many small settlements that were not rebuilt. The Dwellingup fire migrated to the town of Pinjarra where it burned a significant number of buildings. From January to March of that year, about 1,800,000 hectares (4,400,000 acres) was burnt throughout the south-west, with a large loss of livestock.

== 1970s ==
- 1979–80 Australian bushfire season

- 1980 Ash Wednesday bushfires

- 1974–75 Australian bushfire season: approximately 117 million hectares (290 million acres) (Note: The 1974–75 bushfire season burnt over 100 million hectares (250 million acres), but there are different figures reported: In 1995, the Australian Bureau Statistics reported 117 million hectares (290 million acres); The 2004 National Inquiry on Bushfire Mitigation and Management reports a total of 102 million hectares (250 million acres); The extent of the 1974–75 bushfire season was not known until after the event when satellite images were analysed, due to the fires being mostly located in very remote areas of the continent.) burned. The area burnt, 117 million hectares (290 million acres), is equivalent to 15 percent of Australia's physical land mass that equates to the entire area of France, Spain, and Portugal combined.

== 1980s ==
- 1984–85 Australian bushfire season: NSW in 1984–85, 3,500,000 hectares (8,600,000 acres) were burnt, four lives were lost, 40,000 livestock were killed and $40m damage to property was caused (RFS 2003a).
- 1982–1983 Australian bushfire season: The Ash Wednesday fires of 16 February 1983 caused severe damage in Victoria and South Australia. In Victoria, 210,000 hectares (520,000 acres) were burnt, 2,080 houses destroyed, more than 27,000 stock lost and 47 people lost their lives (CFA 2003a; DSE 2003b, 2003d). Property-related damage was estimated at over $200m and more than 16,000 fire fighters, 1,000 police and 500 defence personnel fought the fires in Victoria. In South Australia, 208,000 hectares (510,000 acres) were burnt, 383 houses were destroyed, 28 people were killed and property-related damage was estimated to be more than $200m (DSE 2003d).

== 1990s ==
- 1998–99 Australian bushfire season: 5 fatalities

- Linton bushfire: 5 firefighters killed on 2 December near Linton in Victoria

- 1997–98 Australian bushfire season: 4 fatalities and 10 houses lost

- 4 fatalities and 10 houses lost on 20 November at Menai in New South Wales

- 1996–97 Australian bushfire season: 3 fatalities and 44 houses lost

- 1 house destroyed in October near Ravensbourne in Queensland.
- 3 fatalities and 43 houses lost on 19 January in the Dandenong Ranges and Mornington Peninsula.

- 1995–96 Australian bushfire season: ??? fatalities and ??? houses lost
  - TBA
- 1994–95 Australian bushfire season: 23 houses lost

- 23 houses lost from September to November in southeast Queensland.

- 1993–94 Australian bushfire season: 4 fatalities, 206 houses lost, 800,000 hectares (2,000,000 acres) burnt in NSW

- 1994 eastern seaboard fires: 4 fatalities and 206 houses lost on the east coast of New South Wales

- 1992–93 Australian bushfire season: 4 houses lost

- 4 houses lost at Coominya in Queensland

- 1991–92 Australian bushfire season: 3 fatalities, 17 houses lost

- 2 fatalities and 14 houses lost on 16 October in western Sydney and the Central Coast in New South Wales
- 1 fatality and 3 houses lost at Mount Tamborine in Queensland

- 1990–91 Australian bushfire season: 4 fatalities, 25 houses lost

- 3 fatalities in Queensland
- 8 houses lost on 23 December across New South Wales
- 1 fatality and 17 houses lost on 27 December at Strathbogie

== 2000s ==
- 2009–10 Australian bushfire season: 2 fatalities, at least 57 houses lost

- 5 houses lost during November near Swansea and St Helens in Tasmania
- A park ranger died in a helicopter crash on 9 December in the Dorrigo National Park in New South Wales
- 9 houses lost on 17 December at Gerogery, Tooma and Michelago in New South Wales
- 6 houses lost on 23 December at Port Lincoln in South Australia
- 37 houses lost on 29 December near Toodyay in Western Australia
- A firefighter killed in a vehicle accident on 10 January near Tatong on the way to a fire near Mansfield in Victoria.

- 2008–09 Australian bushfire season: 173 fatalities, 2,060 houses lost

- 2 houses lost on 13 January at Port Lincoln in South Australia
- 31 houses lost from 30 January to 1 February at Yinnar, Boolarra and Mirboo North in Victoria
- Black Saturday bushfires: 173 fatalities, 2,056 houses lost and 239,637 hectares (592,160 acres) burned on 7 February at numerous locations in Victoria

- 2007–08 Australian bushfire season: 5 fatalities, 1 house lost

- 2007 Kangaroo Island bushfires
- 3 truck drivers killed on 30 December at Boorabbin National Park in Western Australia
- One house lost on 10 January in the Kangarilla and Echunga area of South Australia

- 2006–07 Australian bushfire season: 5 fatalities, 63 houses lost

- 7 houses lost on 24 September at Picton, Thirlmere and Oakdale in New South Wales
- 1 fatality, 33 houses lost, and 1,154,828 hectares (2,853,640 acres) burnt in the Great Divide fire complex from 1 December 2006 to 7 February 2007 across alpine Victoria
- 22 houses lost on 11–14 December at Scamander and Four Mile Creek in Tasmania
- 1 house lost on 12 December at Kalamunda in Western Australia

- 2005–06 Australian bushfire season: 3+ fatalities, 54 houses lost

- 2006 Junee Bushfire
- Pulletop bushfire
- Jail Break Inn Fire: 10 houses lost on 1 January near Junee in New South Wales
- 3 houses lost on 1 January near Gosford in New South Wales
- Mount Lubra bushfire: 2 fatalities, 41 houses lost and 116,380 hectares (287,600 acres) burned from 19 January around the Grampians National Park in Victoria
- 2 fatalities and 16 houses lost from other fires during January in Victoria

- 2004–05 Australian bushfire season: 9 fatalities, 3 houses lost

- Eyre Peninsula bushfire: 9 fatalities and 93 houses lost on 11 January on the Eyre Peninsula in South Australia

- 2003–04 Australian bushfire season
- 2002–03 Australian bushfire season: 7 fatalities and at least 549 houses lost

- 1 fatality and 10 houses lost from 16–29 October near Toowoomba in Queensland
- 10 houses lost on 9 October at Engadine in New South Wales
- 2002 Sydney: 41 homes were lost on 4 December 2002 at Glenorie, a suburb north of Sydney.
- 2003 Eastern Victorian alpine bushfires: 41 houses lost and 1,200,000 hectares (3,000,000 acres) burned from 8 January to 19 March in northeastern Victoria.
- 2003 Canberra bushfires: 4 fatalities and 488 houses lost on 18 January in western Canberra and nearby townships.

- 2001–02 Australian bushfire season: 110 houses lost

- Black Christmas bushfires: 109 houses lost and 733,342 hectares (1,812,130 acres) burned from 24 December to 16 January at numerous locations in New South Wales.
- 1 house lost in March at Glenaroua in Victoria
- 2001 Warragamba bushfires

- 2000–01 Australian bushfire season: 11 houses lost

- 11 houses lost from 1–9 February at Tulka in South Australia.

== 2010s ==
- 2018–19 Australian bushfire season: 35 houses lost, 1 fatality

- 2018 Central Queensland bushfires

- 2017–18 Australian bushfire season: 94 buildings lost

- 2018 Tathra bushfire

- 2016–17 Australian bushfire season: 46 houses lost
- 2015–16 Australian bushfire season: 9 fatalities, 408 houses lost

- The most destructive bushfire season in terms of human life and property loss since the 2008–09 Australian bushfire season prior to the 2019-2020 bushfires. Insurance losses of around A$353 million
- At least 317,000 hectares (780,000 acres) burned
- Loss of 408 houses and at least 500 non-residential buildings
- 8 deaths as a direct result of fire: 6 people died in Western Australia, 2 in South Australia. In New South Wales a volunteer firefighter died due to unrelated health complications while on duty.
- 2015 Esperance bushfires: 4 fatalities; 19 buildings destroyed
- 2015 Pinery bushfire: 2 fatalities; 470+ buildings destroyed
- 2016 Tasmanian bushfires: catastrophic impact on Tasmanian Wilderness World Heritage Area lands
- 2016 Waroona–Yarloop bushfire

- 2014–15 Australian bushfire season: 1 fatality, 48 houses lost

- 75,000 hectares (190,000 acres) burned over twelve days in September and threatened the town of Tom Price and the western portion of Karijini National Park in Western Australia
- 1 farmer killed and two firefighters injured on 1 November while fighting a fire about 100 kilometres (62 mi) north of Adelaide at Nantawarra, South Australia. The fire burnt out about 1,800 hectares (4,448 acres) of grassland
- 2015 Sampson Flat bushfires, South Australia: 32 houses lost, 125 outbuildings

- 2013–14 Australian bushfire season: 3 fatalities, 335 buildings lost

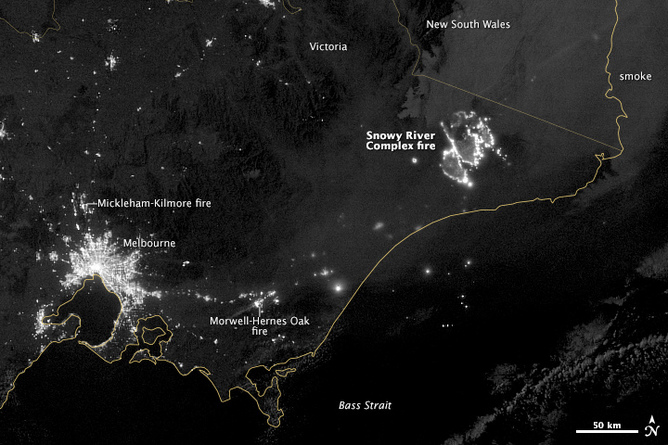
NASA image showing the Snowy River bushfire in Eastern Victoria at night in February 2014. The bushfire which lasted for 70 days grew to 165 800 ha and was roughly the same size as Melbourne. Also visible are the fires at the Hazelwood coalmine and Kilmore. Source: NASA Earth Observatory.

- 2013 New South Wales bushfires: 2 fatalities, 208 houses lost 86,000 hectares (210,000 acres) bushland burnt including parts of the World Heritage–listed Greater Blue Mountains
- 2014 Perth Hills bushfire: 1 fatality and 52 houses lost on 12–13 January in the Perth Hills around Parkerville, Stoneville and Mount Helena.
- 32 houses lost on 15–20 January around the northern Grampians in western Victoria
- 15 houses lost on 17–19 January in the Barossa Valley and Flinders Ranges in South Australia.
- The Snowy River bushfire in Eastern Victoria in February 2014. The bushfire which lasted for 70 days grew to 165,800 hectares (410,000 acres) and was roughly the same size as Melbourne. Also burning were fires at Hazelwood coal mine and Kilmore

- 2012–13 Australian bushfire season: 4 fatalities, 314 buildings lost

- 7 houses lost on 11 November at Tulka near Port Lincoln, South Australia
- Several properties lost from 8–10 December at Myora Springs, Stradbroke Island, Queensland
- 2013 Tasmanian bushfires: 1 fatality and 203 houses lost from 3–5 January in Dunally, Boomer Bay, Bicheno, Sommers Bay, and Copping
- 1 house lost on 9 January at Jugiong in New South Wales
- 9 houses lost on 8 January at Snake Valley, Chepstowe and Carngham in Victoria
- 51 houses lost from 13–17 January from a fire in the Warrumbungle National Park west of Coonabarabran, New South Wales
- 1 fatality and 22 houses lost from 17–18 January in bushfires affecting Coongulla, Glenmaggie, Heyfield, Newry and Seaton in Victoria
- 2 firefighters killed by a falling tree on 13 February fighting a fire near Harrietville
- 1 fatality and 4 houses lost during February in fires affecting Esperance, Boddington and Bridgetown in Western Australia
- 16 houses lost on 27 March at Dereel in Victoria
- 2013 Cherryville Bushfire: 1 house lost on 9 May near Cherryville in South Australia

- 2011–12 Australian bushfire season: 32 houses lost

- 32 houses lost on 23–26 November near Margaret River in Western Australia

- 2010–11 Australian bushfire season: 83 houses lost

- 10 houses lost on 10–12 January at Lake Clifton in Western Australia
- 2 houses lost on 1–3 February in Gippsland, Victoria
- 71 houses lost on 5–7 February near Roleystone and Kelmscott in Western Australia

== 2020s ==
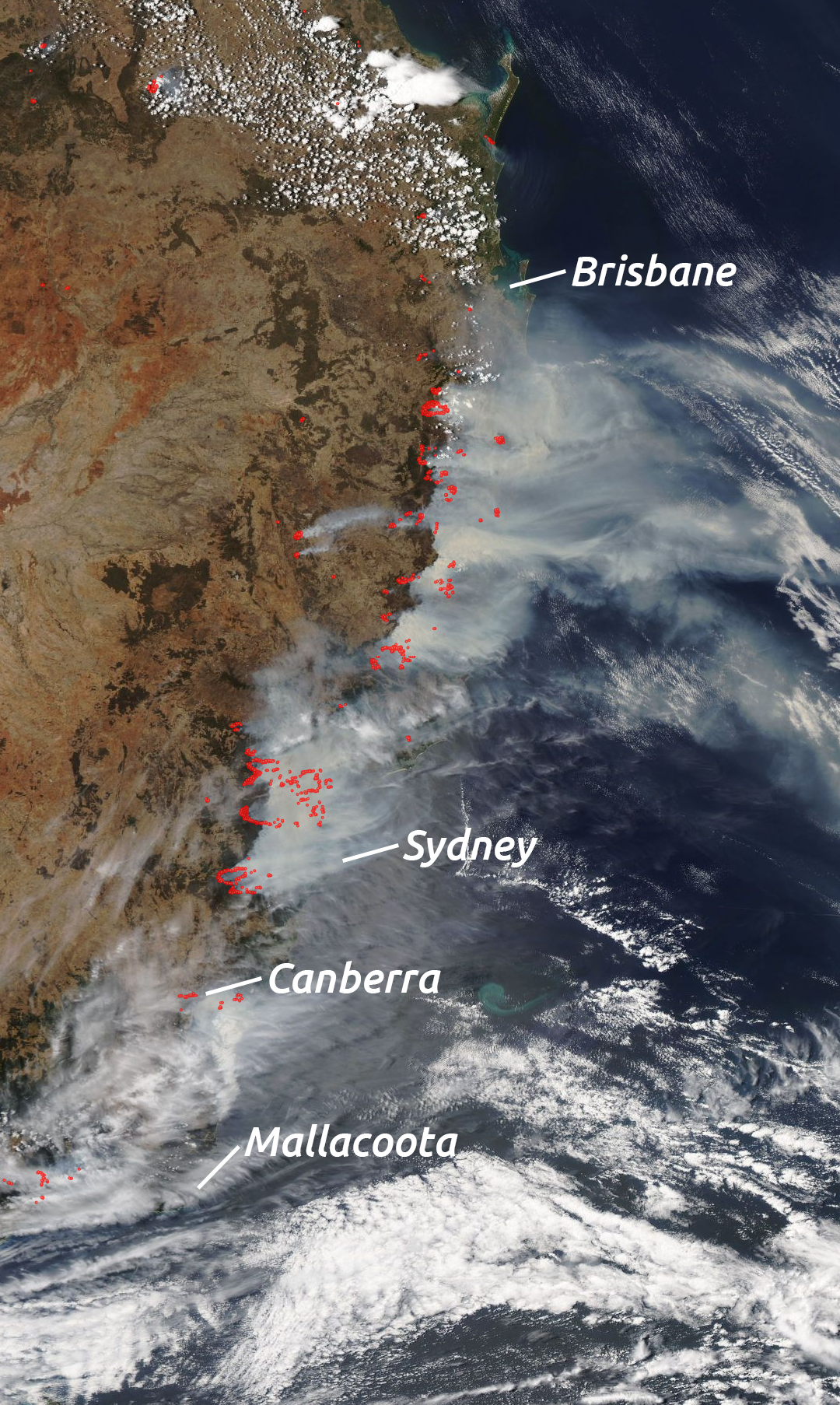
NASA satellite imagery on 7 December 2019 showing bushfires across the east coast of Australia.

- 2019–20 Australian bushfire season

- At least 2,680 homes lost
- 33 deaths (including four firefighters and three US firefighters operating a Lockheed Martin C-130 Large Air Tanker that crashed in the Snowy Monaro Region of southern NSW)
- WWF-Australia estimated at least 1.25 billion wild animals killed
- At least 18.626 million hectares (46.03 million acres) burned

- 2020–21 Australian bushfire season

- 2021 Wooroloo bushfire

- 2021–22 Australian bushfire season

- 2021 Beechina bushfire

- 2022–23 Australian bushfire season
- 2023–24 Australian bushfire season

- 2023 Darling Downs fires
- 2023 Wanneroo bushfire

- 2024–25 Australian bushfire season
- 2025–26 Australian bushfire season

== See also ==
- Bushfires in Australia
- List of major bushfires in Australia
- List of natural disasters in Australia
