= List of major bushfires in Australia =

This is a list of major bushfires in Australia. The list contains individual bushfires and bushfire seasons that have resulted in fatalities, or bushfires that have burned in excess of 5,000 hectares (12,000 acres), or was significant for its damage to particular Australian landmarks.

As of 2010, Australian bushfires accounted for over 800 deaths since 1851 and, in 2012, the total accumulated cost was estimated to be A$1.6 billion. In terms of monetary cost however, bushfires have not cost as much in financial terms as the damage caused by drought, severe storms, hail, and cyclones, perhaps because they most commonly occur outside highly populated urban areas.

Of all the recorded fires in Australia, the 2009 Black Saturday bushfires in the state of Victoria claimed the largest number of recorded deaths of any individual Australian bushfire or bushfires season – 173 fatalities over 21 days. The largest known area burnt was between 100–117 million hectares (250–290 million acres), impacting approximately 15 per cent of Australia's physical land mass, during the 1974–75 Australian bushfire season. The highest number of homes destroyed was approximately 3,700 dwellings, attributed to Victoria's 1939 Black Friday bushfires.

The fires of the summer of 2019–2020 affected densely populated areas including holiday destinations resulting in the New South Wales Rural Fire Service Commissioner, Shane Fitzsimmons, to claim it was "absolutely" the worst bushfire season on record [in that state]. Australian National University described the 2019 fire year as "close to average" and the 2020 fire year as "unusually small".

Some of the most severe Australian bushfires (single fires and fire seasons) have included: (Note: The 1974–1975 and 2019–2020 bushfire seasons have a combined total of area burnt.)

== List ==
Date	Name or description	State(s) / territories	Area burned (approx.)		Fatalities	Properties damaged			Notes
Date	Name or description	State(s) / territories	ha	acres	Fatalities	Homes (destroyed)	Other buildings	Other damage	Notes
6 February 1851	Black Thursday bushfires	Victoria	5,000,000	12,000,000	approximately 12	0	0	1 million sheep; thousands of cattle	
9 September 1895	Upper Blue Mountains fires	New South Wales	150	370	0	24	Sheds	Main Western Railway Line at Mount Victoria	
1 February 1898	Red Tuesday bushfires	Victoria	260,000	640,000	12	0	2,000		
February – March 1926	1926 bushfires	Victoria	390,000	960,000	60	1,000	0		
13 January 1939	Black Friday bushfires	Victoria	2,000,000	4,900,000	71	3,700	0		
14 January – 14 February 1944	1944 Victorian bushfires	Victoria	1,000,000	2,500,000	15–20	approximately 500	0		
18 November 1944	1944 Blue Mountains bushfire	New South Wales			0	approximately 40	0		
October 1951 – January 1952	1951–52 bushfires	Victoria	4,000,000	9,900,000	11	0	0		
October 1951 – January 1952	1951–52 bushfires	New South Wales (South Coast)		2,000,000	5	85	0		
October 1951 – January 1952	1951–52 bushfires	New South Wales (Western)	4,500,00		11	?	?		
October 1951 – January 1952	1951–52 bushfires	Australian Capital Territory	10,000		2	?	?		
2 January 1955	Black Sunday bushfires	South Australia	39,000–160,000	96,000–395,000	2	40 (Note: Included the Governor's summer residence at Marble Hill)	0		
30 November 1957	1957 Grose Valley bushfire, Blue Mountains	New South Wales			4	0	0		
2 December 1957	1957 Leura bushfire, Blue Mountains	New South Wales			0	170 (Note: Included the Chateau Napier)	0		
January – March 1961	1961 Western Australian bushfires	Western Australia	1,800,000	4,400,000	0	160	0		
14–16 January 1962	1962 Victorian bushfires	Victoria			32	450	0		
16 February – 13 March 1965	1965 Gippsland bushfires	Victoria	315,000	780,000	0	more than 20	60	4,000 livestock	
5–14 March 1965	Southern Highlands bushfires	New South Wales	251,000	620,000	3	59	0		
7 February 1967	Black Tuesday bushfires	Tasmania	264,000	650,000	64	1,293	0		
1968–69	1968–69 Killarney Top Springs bushfires	Northern Territory	40,000,000	99,000,000	0	0	0		
29 November 1968	1968 Blue Mountains Bushfire	New South Wales			4	approximately 120	0		
8 January 1969	1969 bushfires	Victoria			23	230	0		
1969–70	1969–70 Dry River–Victoria River fire	Northern Territory	45,000,000	110,000,000	0	0	0		
1974–1975 summer fire season (defined as October 1974 to February 1975 in Queensland only)	1974–75 Australian bushfire season (Note: The 1974–75 bushfire season burnt over 100 million hectares (250 million acres), but there are different figures reported: In 1995, the Australian Bureau of Statistics reported 117 million hectares (290 million acres); The 2004 National Inquiry on Bushfire Mitigation and Management reports a total of 102 million hectares (250 million acres))	New South Wales; Northern Territory; Queensland; South Australia; Western Australia	117,000,000	290,000,000	6	unknown	unknown	15% of Australia was burnt. The damage was mostly in central Australia and so it did not impact many communities.: 57,000 farm animals; approximately 10,200 kilometres (6,300 mi) of fencing	
12 February 1977	Western Districts bushfires	Victoria	103,000	250,000	4	116	340		
17 December 1977	Blue Mountains Fires 1977	New South Wales	54,000	130,000	2	49	0		
4 April 1978	1978 Western Australian bushfires	Western Australia	114,000	280,000	2	0	6		
December 1979	1979 Sydney bushfires	New South Wales			5	28	0		
3 November 1980	1980 Waterfall bushfire	New South Wales	1,000,000	2,500,000	5 (Note: All firefighters)	14	0		
9 January 1983	Grays Point bushfire	New South Wales			3 (Note: All volunteer firefighters)	0	0		
16 February 1983	Ash Wednesday bushfires	South Australia; Victoria	418,000	1,030,000	75	approximately 2,400	0		
25 December 1984	1984 Western New South Wales grasslands bushfires	New South Wales	500,000	1,200,000	0	0	0	40,000 livestock; A$40 million damages	
Mid-January 1985	1985 Cobar bushfire	New South Wales	516,000	1,280,000	0	0	0	40,000 livestock; A$40 million damages	
1984–1985 season	1984–85 New South Wales bushfires	New South Wales	3,500,000	8,600,000	5	0	0	40,000 livestock; A$40 million damages	
14 January 1985	Central Victoria bushfires	Victoria	50,800	126,000	3	180	0		
27 December 1993 – 16 January 1994	1994 Eastern seaboard fires	New South Wales	400,000	990,000	4	225	0		
8 January 1997	Wooroloo bushfire	Western Australia	10,500	26,000	0	16	0		
21 January 1997	Dandenongs bushfire	Victoria	400	990	3	41	0		
2 December 1997	Lithgow bushfire	New South Wales			2 (Note: Both firefighters)	0	0		
2 December 1997	Menai bushfire	New South Wales			1 (Note: A firefighter)	11	0		
2 December 1997	Perth and South-West Region bushfires	Western Australia	23,000	57,000	2	1	0		
2 December 1998	Linton bushfire	Victoria			5 (Note: All firefighters)	0	0		
25 December 2001 – 7 January 2002	Black Christmas bushfires	New South Wales	753,314	1,861,480	0	121	0		
August–November 2002	2002 NT bushfires	Northern Territory	38,000,000	94,000,000	0	0	0		
19 October 2002	Thurlgona Road Bushfire	New South Wales			0	10	Numerous Sheds		
20 October 2002	Abernathy Bushfire	New South Wales	1,400	3,459	1	13	Numerous Sheds		
4 December 2002	2002 NSW Bushfires	New South Wales			1	20		Significant damage to Holsworthy Army Base	
18–22 January 2003	2003 Canberra bushfires	Australian Capital Territory	160,000	400,000	4	approximately 500	0		
8 January – 8 March 2003	2003 Eastern Victorian alpine bushfires	Victoria	1,300,000	3,200,000	0	41	213	10,000 livestock	
December 2003	Tenterden	Western Australia	15,000	37,000	0	2	0		
10–12 January 2005	2005 Eyre Peninsula bushfire	South Australia	77,964	192,650	9	93	0		
New Years Day 2006	Jail Break Inn Fire, Junee	New South Wales	30,000	74,000	0	7	4	20,000 livestock; 7 headers; 1,500 kilometres (930 mi) of fencing	
December 2005 – January 2006	2005 Victorian bushfires	Victoria	160,000	400,000	4	57	359	65,000 livestock	
January 2006	Grampians bushfire	Victoria	184,000	450,000	2	0	0		
6 February 2006	Pulletop bushfire, Wagga Wagga	New South Wales	9,000	22,000	0	0	2	2,500 livestock; 3 vehicles; 50 kilometres (31 mi) of fencing	
1 December 2006 – March 2007	The Great Divides bushfire	Victoria	1,048,000	2,590,000	1	51	0		
September 2006 – January 2007	2006–07 Australian bushfire season	New South Wales; South Australia; Tasmania; Victoria; Western Australia	1,360,000	3,400,000	5	83	approx. 20		
4 February 2007	Dwellingup bushfire	Western Australia	12,000	30,000	0	16	0		
6–14 December 2007	2007 Kangaroo Island bushfires	South Australia	95,000	230,000	1	0	0		
30 December 2007	Boorabbin National Park	Western Australia	40,000	99,000	3	0	0	Powerlines; Great Eastern Highway was closed for 2 weeks	
7 February – 14 March 2009	Black Saturday bushfires	Victoria	450,000	1,100,000	173	2,029	2,000		
4 January 2013	Tasmanian bushfires	Tasmania	20,000	49,000	1				
18 January 2013	Warrumbungle bushfire	New South Wales	54,000	130,000	0	53	118	Agricultural machinery and livestock; Infrastructure at Siding Spring Observatory	
17–28 October 2013	2013 New South Wales bushfires	New South Wales	100,000	250,000	1	208	40		
27 December 2011 – 3 February 2012	Carnarvon bushfire complex	Western Australia	800,000	2,000,000	0	0	0	11 pastoral stations (fences, watering systems, water points, stock feed)	
2–9 January 2015	2015 Sampson Flat bushfires	South Australia	20,000	49,000	0	27	140		
29 January – 20 February 2015	2015 O'Sullivan bushfire (Northcliffe – Windy Harbour)	Western Australia	98,923	244,440	0	2	5	Thousands of hectares of production forests (karri and jarrah) or national parks	
January 2015	2015 Lower Hotham bushfire (Boddington)	Western Australia	52,373	129,420	0	1	1	1 bridge; Thousands of hectares of production forest (jarrah) or national parks	
1–9 August 2015	2015 Wentworthfalls Winter Fire	New South Wales	800	2,000	0	0	0		
October–November 2015	2015 Esperance bushfires	Western Australia	200,000	490,000	4	10	0	15,000 livestock; 5 Nature Reserves; Most of Cape Arid National Park	
15–24 November 2015	Perth Hills bushfire complex – Solus Group	Western Australia	10,016	24,750	0	0	0	Jarrah production forest and Conservation Park	
25 November – 2 December 2015	2015 Pinery bushfire	South Australia	85,000	210,000	2	91	0		
January 2016	2016 Murray Road bushfire (Waroona and Harvey)	Western Australia	69,165	170,910	2	181	Yarloop Workshops	Thousands of hectares of Lane Poole Reserve; Production forest (jarrah)	
11–14 February 2017	2017 New South Wales bushfires	New South Wales	52,000	130,000	0	35	0		
Early February 2019	Tingha bushfire	New South Wales	23,419	57,870	0	19			
5 September 2019 – 2 March 2020	2019–20 Australian bushfire season (Black Summer)	Nationwide	18,626,000	46,030,000	34 (Note: Includes 3 NSW firefighters, 1 Victorian firefighter, and 3 US firefighters who were killed in a Lockheed C-130 Hercules water tanker crash in the Snowy Monaro region)	approximately 2,600 (Note: As of 13 January 2020: NSW 2,162+; SA 100+; Vic 54+; Qld 40+; NT 5; Tas 1; WA unknown)	approximately 6,000	At least one billion wild animals are estimated to have died (not including frogs and insects) with some species thought to be facing extinction.	Area Other
1 June 2020 – 1 June 2021	2020–21 Australian bushfire season	Nationwide	250,000	617,763	0	85	Dozen outbuildings and 1 Service Station in Lucindale and dozens of out buildings in Bradbury.; Outbuildings, sheds and a nursery destroyed in Oakford.; Outbuildings lost in Wooroloo and surrounds.; 1 house in Northmead north west of Sydney was severely damaged.		

== Australia Bushfire Seasons ==
- 1974–75 Australian bushfire season
- 2002–03 Australian bushfire season
- 2004–05 Australian bushfire season
- 2005–06 Australian bushfire season
- 2006–07 Australian bushfire season
- 2007–08 Australian bushfire season
- 2008–09 Australian bushfire season
- 2009–10 Australian bushfire season
- 2010–11 Australian bushfire season
- 2011–12 Australian bushfire season
- 2012–13 Australian bushfire season
- 2013–14 Australian bushfire season
- 2014–15 Australian bushfire season
- 2015–16 Australian bushfire season
- 2016–17 Australian bushfire season
- 2017–18 Australian bushfire season
- 2018–19 Australian bushfire season
- 2019–20 Australian bushfire season
- 2020–21 Australian bushfire season
- 2021–22 Australian bushfire season
- 2022–23 Australian bushfire season
- 2023–24 Australian bushfire season
- 2024–25 Australian bushfire season
- 2025–26 Australian bushfire season
