= List of natural disasters in Australia =

This is a list of all major disasters in modern Australian history. The disasters included here are all the notable events that resulted in significant loss of life or property due to natural, non-biological processes of the Earth within Australian territory. Due to inflation, the monetary damage estimates are not comparable. Unless otherwise noted, the year given is when the currency's valuation was calculated. References can be found in the associated articles noted.

Year	Disaster	Event	Death toll	Material destruction	Estimated cost	Notes
1851	Bushfire	Black Thursday bushfires	12	50,000 square kilometres (12,000,000 acres; 5,000,000 ha) burnt One million sheep and thousands of cattle		
1852	Flood	1852 Gundagai flood	89	Destroyed the entire town		A severe flash flood destroyed the town of Gundagai.
1860	Flood	Nowra Flood	16			The flood led to the rebuilding of Nowra as it was originally located in a low-lying area near the Shoalhaven River. The village of Terara was also abandoned and its residents moved to the relocated Nowra.
1875	Cyclone	Sinking of the SS Gothenburg	98–112	Sinking of the SS Gothenburg		In February 1875 Gothenburg was wrecked by a cyclone on the Great Barrier Reef off the north coast of Queensland. 22 people survived in three lifeboats. Records of passengers vary.
1887	Cyclone	Unnamed Cyclone (1887)	140	Around 20 boats lost.		A late season cyclone hit the Eighty Mile Beach area (then known as Ninety Mile Beach), devastating the pearling fleet there.
1893	Flood	1893 Brisbane flood	35		A$4 million (1893 figures)	Occasionally referred to as the Great Flood of 1893 or the Black February flood
1894	Cyclone	1894 January 4th unnamed tropical cyclone	40+	12 luggers and the steamer Anne sunk, 15000 sheep killed	£15,000	On 4 January 1894 and 9 January 1894 – Within the space of five days, two cyclones crossed the Pilbara coast. The first caused damage to many buildings at Roebourne and Cossack. The second cyclone caused more significant damage to the area completely washing away the previously damaged sea wall at Cossack.
1894	Cyclone	1894 January 9th unnamed tropical cyclone	40+	12 luggers and the steamer Anne sunk, 15000 sheep killed	£15,000	On 4 January 1894 and 9 January 1894 – Within the space of five days, two cyclones crossed the Pilbara coast. The first caused damage to many buildings at Roebourne and Cossack. The second cyclone caused more significant damage to the area completely washing away the previously damaged sea wall at Cossack.
1895–1896	Heat wave	1895–1896 Australian heat wave	437			Widespread heat wave killed 437, including 47 in Bourke, New South Wales.
1896	Cyclone	Cyclone Sigma	23–26			
1897	Cyclone	1897 Darwin cyclone	28	Destroyed the city of Darwin	£150,000 (1897 AUD)	The cyclone is considered the worst cyclone to strike the Northern Territory of Australia prior to Cyclone Tracy in 1974. Prior to contemporary naming conventions, the storm became known as the "Great Hurricane".
1898	Bushfire	Red Tuesday bushfires	12	Two thousand buildings		
1899	Cyclone	Cyclone Mahina	300–410			
1903	Cyclone	Cyclone Leonta	14		£250,000 damage (1903 AUD)	12 people killed in Townsville and 2 in Charters Towers and caused massive property damage across North Queensland
1907–1908	Heat wave	1907–1908 Australian heat wave	246			There were 105 deaths in South Australia alone (between 7 December 1907 and 8 February 1908).
1909	Flood	1909 Western Victorian floods	4			
1909–1910	Heat wave	1909–1910 Australian heat wave	109			1909 Dec – 1910 Feb
1911	Cyclone	Sinking of the SS Yongala	122	SS Yongala		En route from Melbourne to Cairns she steamed into a cyclone and sank south of Townsville. The wreck is one of the largest and well-preserved shipwrecks of Queensland's seas.
1911–1912	Heat wave	1911–1912 Australian heat wave	143			
1912	Cyclone	Sinking of the SS Koombana and Balla Balla cyclone	173+			The SS Koombana was lost in a cyclone between Port Hedland and Broome with all 158 on board. The cyclone crossed the Western Australia coast around Balla Balla, early on 22nd. Several other ships and vessels were also wrecked in the cyclone, claiming another 15 lives.
1913–1914	Heat wave	1913–1914 Australian heat wave	122			
1916	Flood	Clermont flood of 1916	65			On 28 December floods in Clermont, Queensland from a cyclone in the Whitsunday Passage which led to cyclonic rains.
1918	Cyclone	Mackay cyclone	30			Cyclone and storm surge that caused heavy damage in Mackay, Rockhampton and surrounding areas on 20 January 1918.
1918	Cyclone	Innisfail cyclone	37–97			On 10 March 1918, a cyclone passed over Innisfail. Only 12 houses in the town of 3500 residents survived being blown flat or unroofed, and damage was also widespread in Cairns,100 km to the north, Babinda, and inland to the Atherton Tableland.
1920–1921	Heat wave	1920–1921 Australian heat wave	147			
1926	Bushfire	1925–26 Victorian bushfire season	60	1,000 buildings were destroyed.		The worst fires occurred on 14 February (Black Sunday) in the Gippsland region and other areas, where 31 people died at Warburton, Victoria. Houses and buildings were destroyed in many places including Erica and Belgrave. The town of Noojee was destroyed, with only the hotel left standing. In all, over the two-month period, 60 people died and 1,000 buildings were destroyed.
1926–1927	Heat wave	1926–1927 Australian heat wave	130			1926 Dec – 1927 Jan
1929	Flood	1929 Tasmanian floods	22			Eight drowned when truck ploughed into river and 14 died when dam collapsed and wall swept into town.
1932	Bushfire	1932 West Gippsland fires	9	206,000 ha burnt		Six of the nine killed were mill workers who became trapped in the town Erica.
1934	Flood	1934 Victorian floods	36	400 houses		Torrential rainfall of up to 350 millimetres (14 in). Yarra River becomes raging torrent. Extensive damage with 35 dead, 250 injured, and 6,000 homeless. Of the dead, 18 died from drowning.
1938	Bushfire	Black Sunday	5			A rough surf pulled in swimmers at Bondi Beach, Sydney, leading to 245 people saved with 60 receiving treatment and 35 revived from unconsciousness.
1938–1939	Heat wave	Black Friday bushfires	438			Heat wave killed 438 and sparked the Black Friday bushfires (see below).
1938–1939	Bushfire	Black Friday bushfires	71	3,700 buildings		
1939–1940	Heat wave	1939–1940 Australian heat wave	112			
1943–1944	Bushfire	1943–44 Victorian bushfire season	51	500 buildings		Bushfires broke out in various parts of Victoria from late December 1943 to mid February 1944, resulting in 51 deaths, and destroying 500 buildings.
1947	Hailstorm	Sydney hailstorm	0		45,000,000 AUD (2007)	
1951	Volcano	Mount Lamington eruption	2,942			Occurred in the former Territory of Papua and New Guinea. Deadliest natural disaster in Australian history.
1954	Cyclone	The Gold Coast Cyclone	26–30			A tropical cyclone (known as The Gold Coast Cyclone) crossed the coast late evening on 20 February 1954 at Coolangatta. Extreme rainfall associated with the cyclone produced record totals, including 900mm at Springbrook, Queensland in the 24 hours crossing and 809mm at Dorrigo, New South Wales in 24 hours to 9 am on 21st. There was widespread severe flooding over many areas of NSW.
1955	Bushfire	Black Sunday bushfires	2			
1955	Flood	1955 Hunter Valley floods	25			Most deaths were around Singleton and Maitland, but most other river systems in the state were also in flood.
1959	Heat wave	1959 Australian heat wave	105–145			1959 Jan – Feb heat wave in southern regions of Australia. Some sources puts the death toll as high as 145.
1961	Bushfire	Western Australian bushfires	0	160 homes		
1965	Bushfire	Chatsbury bushfires	3	59 homes		
1967	Bushfire	Tasmanian fires	62	1,293 homes		Now known as Black Tuesday, 7000 left homeless as over a hundred fires burned in southern Tasmania.
1969	Bushfire	1969 bushfires	23	230 houses, 21 other buildings and more than 12,000 stock		Occurred on 8 January 1969. 17 casualties at Lara
1970	Cyclone	Cyclone Ada	14		12,000,000 AUD (1970)	
1971	Flood	1971 Canberra flood.	7			
1971	Tornado	Kin Kin tornado	3		100,000 AUD	A tornado swept through the town of Kin Kin.
1974	Bushfire	1974-75 Australian bushfire season	6	Farmers' crops, 57,000 farm animals, and 10,200 kilometres (6,300 mi) of fencing		Fire burned up 117 million hectares (290 million acres), which is 15% of Australia's land.
1974	Flood	Brisbane flood	16		980,000,000 AUD	
1974	Cyclone	Cyclone Tracy	71		645,350,000 USD (1974)	Cyclone Tracy destroys the city of Darwin on Christmas Day 1974. Top wind gust recorded was 217 kilometres per hour (135 mph). On 17 March 2005, a Northern Territory Coroner's Inquest outcome increased the official death toll from 65 to 71.
1978	Cyclone	Cyclone Alby	7		45,000,000 USD (1978)	
1983	Bushfire	Ash Wednesday bushfires	75	2,400 homes		
1989	Cyclone	Cyclone Orson	5		16,800,000 USD (1989)	
1989	Earthquake	Newcastle earthquake	13		4,000,000,000 AUD	
1990	Flood	Cyclone Nancy	6			Tropical Cyclone Nancy crossed the coast near Byron Bay, then moving back out to sea. It brought extremely heavy rain which led to flash flooding, with 6 lives lost to drowning.
1990	Cyclone	Cyclone Nancy	6			Tropical Cyclone Nancy crossed the coast near Byron Bay, then moving back out to sea. It brought extremely heavy rain which led to flash flooding, with 6 lives lost to drowning.
1993–1994	Bushfire	Eastern seaboard fires	4	225 homes		
1996	Landslide	Gracetown landslide	9			About 30 tonnes of rock and sand fell from a cliff to the below spectators of a school surf event.
1997	Landslide	Thredbo landslide	18			One victim was found alive after 60 hours of being buried.
1998	Flood	Cyclone Les (1998)	3			
1998	Cyclone	Cyclone Les (1998)	3			
1998	Flood	1998 Townsville and Thuringowa city floods	1		$100,000,000 AUD	
1998	Bushfire	Linton Bushfire	5			
1998	Thunderstorm	Sydney to Hobart Yacht Race	6		30,000,000 AUD	A supercell storm caused chaos during the annual Sydney to Hobart Yacht Race, with only 44 out of 115 yachts finishing.
1999	Cyclone	Cyclone Vance	0		100,000,000 USD (1999)	
1999	Hailstorm	Sydney hailstorm	1		2,300,000,000 AUD	
2001–2002	Bushfire	Black Christmas bushfires	0	121 homes		
2002	Cyclone	Cyclone Chris	12		929,000 USD (2002)	
2003	Thunderstorm	2003 Melbourne thunderstorm	0			The Australian Bureau of Meteorology called the storm a "once in 100-year event".
2003	Bushfire	Canberra bushfires	4	Close to 500 homes	350,000,000 AUD (2003)	
2003	Bushfire	Eastern Victorian alpine bushfires	3	41 homes		
2005	Bushfire	Eyre Peninsula bushfire, 2005	9	93 homes		
2006	Bushfire	Junee Bushfire	0			
2006	Cyclone	Cyclone Glenda	0		965,000 USD (2006)	
2006	Bushfire	Mount Lubra bushfire	2			
2006	Cyclone	Cyclone Larry	1		1,100,000,000 USD (2006)	
2006	Bushfire	Pulletop bushfire	0			
2007	Bushfire	Kangaroo Island bushfires	1			
2007	Cyclone	Cyclone George	5		15,700,000 USD (2007)	
2007	Flood/Storm	2007 New South Wales storms	10			
2008	Thunderstorm	Queensland storms	2		500,000,000 AUD	
2009	Heat wave	2009 southeastern Australia heat wave	374			A nine-day heat wave in early 2009 in which Adelaide recorded six consecutive days over 40 °C (104 °F), a high of 45.7 °C (114.3 °F) and a record overnight minimum of 33.9 °C (93.0 °F) on 28 January. Sparked the Black Saturday bushfires (see below). Health authorities attribute 374 deaths to the heat wave.
2009	Bushfire	Black Saturday bushfires	173	2,029 homes, 2,000 other structures		
2009	Cyclone	Cyclone Hamish	2		38,800,000 USD (2009)	
2010	Flood	March 2010 Queensland floods	0		200,000,000+ AUD	
2010	Flood	March 2010 Victoria storms	0	2000+ houses	500,000,000+ AUD	
2010	Flood	2010 Western Australian storms	0		$1,080,000,000 AUD	It is the costliest natural disaster in Western Australian history
2010	Flood	September 2010 Victoria floods	0	250		
2010	Flood	2010 Gascoyne River flood	0	two thousand head of cattle perished	100,000,000 AUD ( preliminary)	The most severe flood to take place along the Gascoyne River in Western Australia on record.
2010–2011	Flood	2010–11 Queensland floods	33		2,390,000,000 AUD	
2011	Cyclone	Cyclone Yasi	1		3,600,000,000 USD (2011)	
2011	Flood	2011 Victoria floods	2		$2,000,000,000 AUD	
2011	Flood	2011 Wollongong floods	0			
2013	Bushfire	Tasmanian bushfires	1	170+ buildings		
2013	Bushfire	New South Wales bushfires	1			
2013	Cyclone	Cyclone Oswald	7		2,520,000,000 USD (2013)	
2014	Hailstorm	Brisbane hailstorm	0		1,100,000,000 AUD	
2014	Cyclone	Cyclone Ita	0		1,150,000,000 USD (2014)	
2015	Bushfire	Sampson Flat bushfires	0			
2015	Bushfire	Esperance bushfires	4			
2015	Bushfire	Pinery bushfire	2			
2017	Bushfire	Carwoola bushfire	0	56 buildings		
2017	Cyclone	Cyclone Debbie	14		2,730,000,000 USD (2017)	
2018	Flood	2018 Broome flood	0			The rainfall was caused by Cyclone Joyce, which struck Broome on 12 January 2018. Another tropical low struck the area two weeks later, which delivered further rains. Cyclone Kelvin then hit on 16 February.
2018	Bushfire	Tathra bushfire	0	69 homes		
2019	Flood	2019 Townsville flood	5	1500 homes rendered uninhabitable	1,243,000,000	
2019–2020	Bushfire	2019–20 bushfire season	34 direct (Note: At least 34 (as of 24 Jan 2020))	9,352 buildings: 3,500 homes; 5,852 outbuildings Approximately 24,300,000 hectares (60,000,000 acres) to 33,800,000 hectares (84,000,000 acres).	103,000,000,000 AUD	
2019–2020	Bushfire	2019–20 bushfire season	445 indirect (smoke inhalation)	9,352 buildings: 3,500 homes; 5,852 outbuildings Approximately 24,300,000 hectares (60,000,000 acres) to 33,800,000 hectares (84,000,000 acres).	103,000,000,000 AUD	
2021	Bushfire	Wooroloo bushfire	0	86 buildings, 10,900 hectares (27,000 acres)		
2021	Flood	2021 Eastern Australia floods	3		A$1,000,000,000 (estimate)	A widespread weather event with heavy rain over several days caused flooding in Western Sydney and the Far North Coast, extending into South East Queensland. At least 18,000 people were evacuated.
2021	Cyclone	Cyclone Seroja	1 (Note: In addition to at least 181 in Indonesia and at least 42 in East Timor)	70% of homes in Northampton and Kalbarri sustaining damage or destruction. Areas along the cyclone track receiving less but still considerable damage, including Geraldton, Morawa, Mingenew, Mullewa, Perenjori down to Merredin.	$200m AUD estimate in Western Australia	Significant damage to the towns of Northampton and Kalbarri in Western Australia with 70% of homes sustaining damage or destruction.
2022	Cyclone	Cyclone Seth	2			
2022	Flood	2022 eastern Australia floods	28		$4,800,000,000	
2022	Flood	2022 New South Wales floods	1		$379 million (2022 USD)	
2022	Flood	2022 south eastern Australia floods	7			
2022–2023	Cyclone 2022 Kimberley floods					
2023	Cyclone	2023 Cyclone Freddy				
2023	Cyclone	2023 Cyclone Gabrielle				
2023	Cyclone	2023 Invest 94S				
2025	Flood	QLD March Floods				
2025	Flood	NSW May Floods				
2026	Bushfire	Victoria Bushfires				

== See also ==
- List of disasters in Australia by death toll
- Bushfires in Australia
- List of major bushfires in Australia
- List of Australian bushfire seasons
- Floods in Australia
- List of earthquakes in Australia
- List of largest fires of the 21st-century
- List of natural disasters in New Zealand
