= Angry Summer =

2013 Australian summer

Meteorological history
- Date: Early January - March 2013
- Heat event

Overall effects
- Areas affected: Southern Queensland; New South Wales; Victoria; Tasmania; South Australia; Western Australia

The Australian summer of 2012–2013, known as the Angry Summer or Extreme Summer, resulted in 123 weather records being broken over a 90-day period, including the hottest day ever recorded for January on record, the hottest summer average on record, and a record seven days in a row when the whole country averaged above 39 °C (102 °F). Single-day temperature records were broken in dozens of towns and cities, as well as single-day rainfall records, and several rivers flooded to new record highs.

In January 2013, the Bureau of Meteorology altered its weather forecasting chart's temperature scale to include a range, colored purple, between 52 and 54 °C (126 and 129 °F). The reporting of the heatwave in the Australian media attracted controversy in the scientific community, as very few articles cited a correlation between the event and climate change, which it was correlated with according to studies conducted by the University of Melbourne.

== Extent ==
70% of Australia was affected by the heat wave which developed after a persistent pool of hot air sat over the centre of the continent. According to climatologist David Jones, the hot weather began in September 2012. Maximum temperatures in late 2012 were up to 1.6 °C (2.9 °F) above average. Average daily maximum temperatures were the highest between 2 and 8 January 2013. The length of the heatwave in outback Queensland was unusually long. In some areas of that state the overnight temperature did not drop below 35 °C (95 °F).

== Cause ==
Central Australia experienced a lack of cloud cover due to low moisture levels during the hottest part of the year. This allowed the conditions to get hotter than normal. A monsoon trough which usually allows conditions to cool did not eventuate.

== Record temperatures ==
New record temperatures were recorded in every state and the two territories of Australia. The hottest day on record for the whole of Australia was recorded as 40.3 °C (123.3 °F) on 7 January 2013, which was the highest national average temperature recorded in Australia, until 17 December 2019.

Other all-time records broken in January 2013 included:

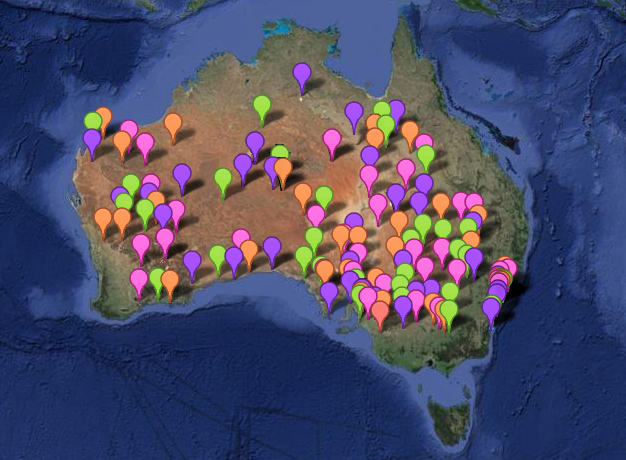
Locations which recorded a temperature of 45 °C or above in January 2013

- 49.0 °C (120.2 °F), Leonora, Western Australia
- 48.8 °C (119.8 °F), Thargomindah, Queensland
- 48.5 °C (119.3 °F), Walgett, New South Wales
- 48.2 °C (118.8 °F), Eucla, Western Australia
- 48.1 °C (118.6 °F), Brewarrina, New South Wales
- 47.7 °C (117.9 °F), Hay, New South Wales
- 47.6 °C (117.7 °F), Windorah, Queensland
- 47.1 °C (116.8 °F), Meekatharra, Western Australia
- 45.4 °C (113.7 °F), Nowra, New South Wales
- 42.5 °C (108.5 °F), Newcastle, New South Wales
- 40.9 °C (105.6 °F), Murrurundi, New South Wales
- 40.9 °C (105.6 °F), Grove, Tasmania
- 40.3 °C (104.5 °F), Plenty, Tasmania
- 36.0 °C (96.8 °F), Oberon, New South Wales

A monsoon low in late January ended the heatwave in Queensland and northern New South Wales, however abnormally hot weather continued into March 2013 in southern parts of Australia. A prolonged heatwave affected Melbourne which was exacerbated by power blackouts. Record maximum temperatures for that month were experienced in Victoria, New South Wales and Tasmania. Parts of South Australia equalled or nearly broke temperature records in the first two weeks of March. Tasmania recorded its hottest March ever. The mean temperature across the state was 2.2 °C (4.0 °F) above normal.

== Bushfires ==
A series of severe bushfires in south-eastern Tasmania in early January 2013 burnt 20,000 hectares (49,000 acres) and destroyed at least 170 buildings. Bushfires also affected parts of Victoria and southern New South Wales.

== Flooding ==
Heatwave conditions in Queensland and northern New South Wales were abruptly ended in late January 2013 with severe flooding caused by Tropical Cyclone Oswald and an associated monsoon trough. Extremely heavy rainfall continued into February as tropical low pressure systems caused havoc in eastern Queensland. Seven-day rainfall totals over 1,000 mm (39.4 in) were recorded in some areas of south-eastern Queensland.

== Link to climate change ==
The heatwave was a major news event and the Australian media wrote over 800 articles about the heat-wave. Only 10% of these mentioned a potential link to climate change, but a report by Australia's Climate Commission entitled Angry Summer states that climate change can be directly linked to the severity of the heatwave. A paper in the American Meteorological Society's Journal of Climate reported that heatwaves have occurred with increasing frequency over the previous 60 years. Research conducted by the University of Melbourne and the ARC Centre of Excellence for Climate Systems Science attributed the record temperatures to anthropogenic influences.

== See also ==
- 2012–13 Australian bushfire season
- 2024 Australia heat wave
- Extreme weather events in Melbourne
