= 2026–27 Australian bushfire season =

- Date: August 2026 – present
- Location: Australia

Impacts
- Deaths: N/A
- Structures destroyed: 3+

Ignition
- Cause: N/A

The 2026–27 Australian bushfire season is the current bushfire season in Australia.

== Seasonal outlooks ==
=== Spring ===
On 19 August, the National Council for Fire & Emergency Services released its bushfire outlook for the coming spring. Predicting high risk areas for the upcoming bushfire season. Below average rainfall has increased bushfire risk potential across northeast and eastern Tasmania, parts of Victoria. In contrast, above average fuel loads and dry soil conditions are contributing to elevated fire risk across parts of Western Australia.

== Northern Territory ==
On 16 September, a fire at Blackmore, Northern Territory reached an emergency warning level, with unconfirmed reports of structures being impacted by the fires. According to NT News, three homes, alongside sheds and vehicles, were destroyed by the fire.
