= 2014–15 Australian bushfire season =

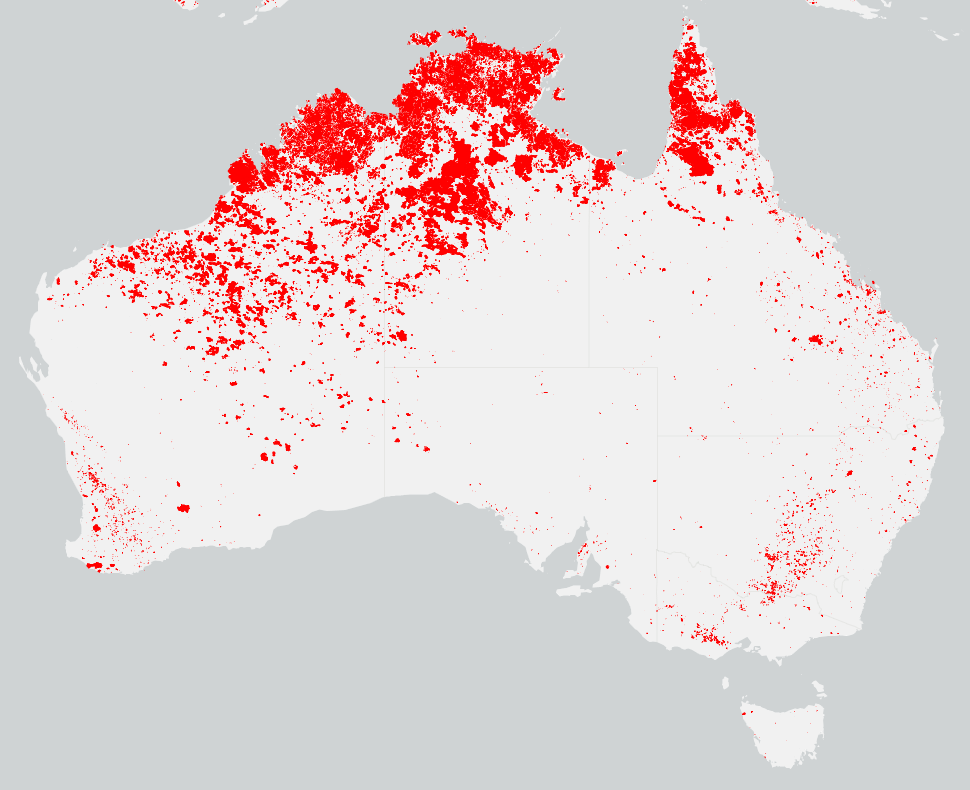
- NASA MODIS burned area detections from June 2014 to May 2015
- Date: Winter (June) 2014 – Autumn (May) 2015
- Location: Australia

Impacts
- Deaths: 1 CFS volunteer firefighter
- Injuries: 139
- Structures destroyed: 210+ total: 48 houses; 160+ non-residential structures

The bushfire season in the summer of 2014–15, was expected to have the potential for many fires in eastern Australia after lower than expected rainfall was received in many areas. Authorities released warnings in the early spring that the season could be particularly bad.

Warmer and drier weather conditions were experienced during winter and extended into 2015, due to a developing El Niño event. Sydney was on track to record its hottest autumn so far and only had one fifth of the average rainfall in May. Adelaide recorded sixteen consecutive days of 20 °C (68 °F) in May 2014.

Queensland sweltered through a heatwave, with record October temperatures being set in many towns through the state. New October records included Toowoomba with 36.4 °C (97.5 °F), St George with 42.6 °C (108.7 °F), Amberley with 41.3 °C (106.3 °F) and Roma with 41.6 °C (106.9 °F).

Throughout 2014 and the first 6 months of 2015, 18 fires were declared "national disasters" affecting a total of 68 local government areas across New South Wales, South Australia, Victoria and the Northern Territory.

== Fires of note ==
State	Start date	Deaths	Injuries	Res. houses lost	Other structures lost	Area (ha)	Local govt.	Impacted communities	Duration	Ref.
NSW	1 August 2014			5	8	9,500	Clarence Valley & Kempsey	Kremnos	4 days	
NT	29 August 2014			1			Litchfield	Howard Springs		
SA	31 October 2014	1	2			1,800	Wakefield	Nantawarra & Port Wakefield		
NSW	1 November 2014			1		6	Blue Mountains	Katoomba	2 days	
VIC	15 December 2014			4	several	5,500	Strathbogie	Creightons Creek, Gooram & Longwood	3 days	
VIC	15 December 2014			1	several	5,750	Moira	Lake Rowan		
VIC	1 January 2015			2	4	5,000	Ararat	Moyston	2 days	
SA	2 January 2015		134	28	150	12,500	Adelaide Hills	Cudlee Creek, Gumeracha, Humbug Scrub, Kersbrook & Lower Hermitage		
WA	5 January 2015		1	1		5	Busselton	Yallingup		
WA	29 January 2015			2	5	95,000	Manjimup	Northcliffe	11 days	
WA	29 January 2015			1	1	52,000	Boddington	Lower Hotham	2 days	
WA	29 January 2015			1		400	Waroona	Waroona	2 days	

== Fires by state or territory ==
=== New South Wales ===
August

During an 8-day period starting on 1 August 114 bush and grass fires burned through 9,500 ha (23,000 acres) of the Clarence Valley and Kempsey local government areas. Five houses were destroyed and a further eight were extensively damaged during the blazes. Eight non-residential buildings and four vehicles were also destroyed in the blazes. A number of these fires were caused by escaped private hazard reduction burns.

November

Fires started near Katoomba in the Blue Mountains just as heatwave conditions commenced in the area on 1 November. The fire dropped over an escarpment and into inaccessible bushland. One house was destroyed and a second house damaged along Cliff Drive after 60 people were evacuated from the area.

More fires started in 14 November near Warrimoo in the Blue Mountains. The local school was evacuated as the out of control blaze spread from a difficult to reach area. Some 36 firefighters were brought in to control the fire which spread toward Blaxland.

=== Northern Territory ===
August & September

Throughout both months, a series of small, suspicious bushfires burned through at least 1,200 ha (3,000 acres) and threatened many properties around Howard Springs and Humpty Doo. On 29 August a house was destroyed in a fire that is thought to have been deliberately lit.

Approximately 400,000 ha (990,000 acres) of pastoral country was burnt out by a fire that burnt for over a week. Most of Birrimba Station, a large portion of Dungowan Station, some of Murranjai and a little of Killarney Station were burnt out.

=== Queensland ===
October

After several days of above average temperatures, at least 18 fires were ignited by lightning in the Darling Downs Granite belt and Sunshine Coast hinterland regions.

November

Over 12,000 ha (30,000 acres) of forest was burnt out by fires near Ravenshoe, south west of Cairns in the far north of Queensland. The fire threatened about 30 homes but was repelled by fire fighters; a shed and caravan were destroyed.

=== South Australia ===
November

A 38-year-old volunteer from the Mount Templeton Country Fire Service brigade dies and two others are injured fighting a fire about 100 kilometres (62 mi) north of Adelaide. The Nantawarra fire burned through about 1,800 ha (4,400 acres) of grassland and scrub after ignition in the header of a machine reaping lentils.

December

On 16 December, two fires ignited in the Barossa Valley area. A firefighter was injured while containing a grassfire that burnt through 700 ha (1,700 acres) near Springton. The second fire, near Angaston, burned through 1,400 ha (3,500 acres) and caused extensive damage to the vineyards of Hutton Vale winery, before being extinguished.

January

A total of 28 houses, 4 businesses, 1 boarding kennel and 145 other non-residential structures were destroyed during the Sampson Flat bushfires, which ignited on 2 January in the vicinity of Sampson Flat in the Adelaide Hills and burned through approximately 12,600 hectares (31,000 acres) of scrub, forest, pasture. The fire also had a significant impact on local agricultural industry; 35 ha (86 acres) of vineyards were destroyed and 900 head of livestock died in the fire. The towns of Cudlee Creek, Gumeracha, Houghton, Kersbrook and Millbrook were threatened by the fire before it was contained on 7 January. Roughly 3,500 firefighters in 1,164 appliances, supported by 25 aircraft, fought the fire on a 240 kilometres (150 mi) perimeter; at least 134 firefighters and civilians suffered injuries, mostly minor, during the 6-day incident.

=== Victoria ===
December

On 15 December, a lightning storm ignited 350 fires across the state; at Creightons Creek, south of Euroa, 4 houses were destroyed by the 'Creightons Creek' fire and at Lake Rowan, 1 house was destroyed by the 'Lake Rowan-Warby Ranges' fire. The 'Creightons Creek' fire burned through 5,500 ha (14,000 acres) and caused the death of 1,100 head of livestock and the 'Lake Rowan-Warby Ranges' fire burned through 5,750 ha (14,200 acres) and caused the death of 1,700 head of livestock. A total of 1,400 firefighting personnel fought the 350 fires, which also included a 3,500 ha (8,600 acres) fire at Stewarton, north of Benalla, and a small grassfire that burned to within 6 kilometres (3.7 mi) of West Wodonga.

January

Two houses and four farms were destroyed by a fire that ignited 3 kilometres (1.9 mi) north of Moyston township on 2 January, a day of Total Fire Ban. The fire had a significant impact on local agricultural industry; at least 90 farms were damaged—including hundreds of kilometers of fencing—and 3,000 head of livestock died. Within 5 hours from ignition, the fire had progressed 21 kilometres (13 mi), burned 4,400 ha (11,000 acres) with a 64 kilometres (40 mi) perimeter. The fire caused large plumes of toxic smoke when it burned through over 30,000 tyres on a private property.

=== Western Australia ===
September

A large bushfire started 16 September and was finally brought under control 12 days later after burning through 75,000 ha (190,000 acres) of mostly bushland. The fire threatened the town of Tom Price and western portion of Karijini National Park.

November

On 26 November, lightning ignited over a dozen bushfires in the Mid West region, burning out over 6,000 hectares (15,000 acres) of pasture land and causing the evacuation of a primary school and several homes in Eneabba. At Gingin, north of Perth, a house and a shed were also damaged in a bushfire.

January

On 5 January, one house and one vehicle were destroyed at Yallingup by a small 5 hectares (12 acres) bushfire. 72 firefighters took 5 hours to bring the fire under control, and one firefighter was treated for heat exhaustion.

Between 8 and 11 January, one firefighter and one police officer were injured by a fire that burned 6,600 hectares (16,000 acres) around the north Perth suburbs of Bullsbrook, Chittering and Muchea.

On 31 January, one house, several vehicles and a number of sheds were destroyed by a 385 hectares (950 acres) bushfire that had ignited on 29 January and threatened the town of Waroona. A portion of the South Western Highway was closed and over 50 residents were evacuated. Approximately 200 firefighters were required to combat the blaze.

February

A fire that had been ignited by lightning near Northcliffe between 29 and 31 January almost doubled in size from 58,000 hectares (140,000 acres) to 80,000 hectares (200,000 acres) during hot, windy conditions on 4 February, and most residents of the town were evacuated to Pemberton. During the 11-day duration of the fire, two homes and five non-residential structures were destroyed and a significant number of livestock perished as the blaze burned over 95,000 hectares (230,000 acres) of scrub, forest and pasture; a natural disaster zone was declared across the region.

Another fire that had been ignited by lightning between 29 and 31 January burned through 52,000 hectares (130,000 acres) of scrub, forest and pasture near Lower Hotham, in Boddington Shire; one house, two sheds, and the 66-year-old wooden Long Gully Bridge were destroyed in the blaze.
