= 2024–25 Australian bushfire season =

Australian bushfires by season

- Date: September 2024 – June 2025
- Location: Australia

Statistics
- Burned area: unspecified

Impacts
- Deaths: 0
- Structures destroyed: unspecified

Ignition
- Cause: Substantial fuel loads; Record high temperatures; Climate change; dry lightning

The 2024–25 Australian bushfire season (Note: Bushfires in Australia can occur all year-round. For what "season" means, see seasonality of bushfires in Australia.) was the summer season of bushfires in Australia. At the beginning of the season temperatures had been above average to high above average for most regions, with parts of Western Australia, South Australia and Queensland experiencing highest on record maximum temperatures for the winter period. August 2024 overall in Australia was the warmest August on record.

In spring, there continued to be an increased likelihood of unusually high maximum temperatures across most of Australia, and increased chance of above average rainfall for much of New South Wales, Queensland and Tasmania. Large parts of Western Australia had an increased chance of below average rainfall. Unseasonal rainfall in Queensland and Northern Territory led to increased fuel loads. August also saw above average to well above average rainfall in both southwest Western Australia and Tasmania, easing dry conditions in these regions.

Fire authorities advised that overall main areas of increased risk of bushfire in Australia at the start of the bushfire season were most parts of the Northern Territory, large areas of northern and central Queensland, and also western Victoria as well as parts of southeastern South Australia.

On 1 February the Bureau of Meteorology announced that Victoria would swelter through a severe heat wave with temperatures up to 43 °C in Mildura.

On 27 February the AFAC identified heightened risk of bushfires from risk of fire for parts of WA, South Australia and Victoria . In WA, increased risk of fire is identified for areas between Perth and Carnarvon, and stretching eastwards across much of the Australian mainland’s southern coastline through SA and reaching all the way to southwest Gippsland in Victoria. AFAC CEO Rob Webb said: “The same dry conditions that have seen recent fires in Victoria and in WA look set to continue across much of the southern coastline of mainland Australia.”

== Western Australia ==
On the 8 October a bushfire was reported at Lake Powell Nature Reserve in Albany. It burnt 4.5ha before being brought under control and sparked a bushfire warning for the Elleker township. The cause of the fire was soon found to be arson, making it the fifth bushfire caused by arson in Albany that year.

== South Australia ==
On 2 November a grassfire occurred in the northern suburbs of Adelaide which burnt 33ha before being controlled, requiring the use of both fixed wing and rotary wing support. The fire caused damage to sheds and greenhouses in the area, and two men were arrested for arson.

== Victoria ==
On 24 December, residents of the Grampians region were evacuated with over 41,000 hectares (100,000 acres) already burnt with Victoria's State Control Centre spokesman Luke Hegarty stating; "We're expecting to see extreme fire danger across almost the entire state". After three weeks, on 6 January, the fire was declared as contained, with a total of 76,000 hectares (190,000 acres) burnt.

On 27 January residents of the township of Dimboola were evacuated with a fire burning out of control in the Little Desert National Park. More than 65,000 hectares (160,000 acres) were burnt in under 8 hours. On 31 January it was deemed contained after burning 70,887 hectares (175,170 acres). The fire got within metres of Dimboola, but no houses in the town were destroyed. A popular wedding destination and youth camp were destroyed.

On 2 February the Little Desert fire jumped lines on the southern side of the fire, with high winds the fires quickly became uncontrollable, evacuation orders were send out for residents on private property near the township of Goroke. As of 3 February the fire had burnt a total of 83,550 hectares (206,500 acres), by 5 February 94,000 hectares (230,000 acres) had burnt and the fire was out of control. On 8 February the fire was deemed contained after burning 95000 hectares.

On 28 January, lightning ignited multiple fires in the Grampians national park, all burning out of control as of 31 January. Favourable conditions on 30 and 31 January gave crews the opportunity to burn out unburnt areas of the national park. With a severe heat wave due to hit Victoria over the first week of February, the fire danger rating was high. On 2 February temperatures across the high 30°Cs were recorded, with temperatures of 39 degrees Celsius (102 degrees Fahrenheit) in Horsham and 41 °C (106 °F) in Mildura. Wind speeds of 30 kilometres per hour (19 miles per hour) in some places with gusts of 55 km/h (34 mph) caused the Bullawin fire to jump lines near the township of Mirranatwa. Later that day, residents were told to evacuate with the fire spreading uncontrollably eastward towards the township.

On 4 February the fire jumped lines on the north eastern side of the fire. Residents in several towns in Victoria's west were advised to "leave immediately" as strong winds drive an out-of-control bushfire in the Grampians national park, the fire was expected to reach Red Rock Road by 8:30pm that night. As of 5 February the fire had burnt a total of 48,000 hectares (120,000 acres). On 8 February the fire was deemed contained, burning 59000 hectares of land, but with high fire danger forecast for 13 February crews are still on high alert.

On 2 February a small bushfire in the states' far north west, in the township of Colignan caused the loss of 2 homes.

On 4 February, dry lightning swept over the states' east, causing multiple small bushfires, none of which reached substantial size.

During the week of 24 February, a bushfire started near Licola. On 6 March the fire grew to 5350 ha.

== See also ==
- 2024 Australia heat wave
