= 2024 Australia heat wave =

Weather event in Australia

Meteorological history
- Duration: December 2024
- Stationary high-pressure area
- Max temp: 47.2 °C (117.0 °F), recorded at Birdsville, Queensland on 26 December 2024

Overall effects
- Areas affected: South Australia, Victoria, New South Wales, Northern Territory, Tasmania, Queensland, Western Australia, ACT

Beginning in mid-December 2024, Australia experienced an intense heatwave affecting multiple states and territories, with temperatures exceeding 45 °C (113 °F) in numerous populated settlements. The heatwave brought temperatures significantly above average for mid-December, with several regions experiencing temperatures 12-16 °C higher than typical seasonal values. The event was characterized by both extreme daytime temperatures and unusually warm overnight conditions, with many areas not dropping below 30 °C (86 °F) throughout the day and night.

== Meteorology ==
In mid-December 2024, Australia experienced an intense heatwave affecting multiple states and territories, with temperatures exceeding 40 °C (104 °F) in numerous locations. The Bureau of Meteorology (BoM) defined this event as a severe to extreme heatwave throughout Northern Australia and severe to low-intensity in southeastern regions.

According to senior Bureau of Meteorology (BoM) meteorologist Dean Narramore, the heatwave was caused by a weather front that brought a combination of heat, dry air, and strong gusty winds across the country. The conditions were described as unusual for the season, particularly in the Northern Territory, where monsoonal weather would typically be expected during this time. He predicted that the temperatures would be the hottest observed in Australia since the "Black Summer" heatwaves in 2019–2020. The BoM elaborated that a high-pressure area in the upper atmosphere strengthened and remained stationary over regions of Australia for extended periods.

== Temperatures ==
=== New South Wales and ACT ===
- Smithville – 45.1 °C (113.2 °F) on 16 December

=== Northern Territory ===
- Jervois – 45 °C (113 °F) on 16 December

=== Queensland ===
- Urandangi – 45.3 °C (113.5 °F) on 16 December
- Birdsville – 47.2 °C (117.0 °F) on 26 December

=== South Australia ===
- Renmark – 46.1 °C (115.0 °F) on 16 December

=== Tasmania ===
- Low Rocky Point – 36.0 °C (96.8 °F) on 16 December

=== Victoria ===
- Walpeup – 47.1 °C (116.8 °F) on 16 December

=== Western Australia ===
- Mardie – 41.3 °C (106.3 °F) on 16 December
- Roebourne – 40 °C (104 °F) on 16 December

== Effects ==
=== Environmental risk ===
On 16 December, authorities issued warnings about a potential mass fish kill in the Darling River system, particularly around Menindee Lakes in western New South Wales. The threat emerged as a result of extreme temperatures caused by the heatwave, multiple red alerts for blue-green algae, and readings taken at several points indicating low oxygen levels, raising concerns about a repeat of a March 2023 event that resulted in approximately 30 million fish deaths.

=== Fire danger ===
The Country Fire Authority (CFA) implemented a total fire ban in Victoria for 15 December, with officials anticipating that extreme conditions would return to northwestern parts of the state on 16 December. CFA Chief Fire Officer Jason Heffernan emphasized the challenging conditions for firefighters and urged for citizens to not be complacent to possible danger. South Australia issued extreme fire danger warnings for 15 December, while New South Wales forecast high fire danger across inland regions on 16 December. Extreme fire danger warnings were also issued for the Melbourne metropolitan area.

New South Wales Rural Fire Service Inspector Ben Shepherd noted increasing fire risks despite recent rainfall due to drying vegetation and forecasted thunderstorm activity, expressing particular concern about holiday travel coinciding with high-risk conditions.

Extreme fire risk was predicted for areas near Mount Lofty in South Australia, which was worsened by predictions of dry thunderstorms.

Tasmania was forecasted to have dry thunderstorms, inland winds of 50–60 km/h and coastal gusts potentially reaching 90 km/h, raising concerns about lightning-sparked fires under the concurrent heatwave conditions.

=== Health and Infrastructure ===
Health authorities emphasized the risk of heat stress and heat-related illnesses.

Several schools in Victoria were cancelled or relocated on 16 December due to extreme heat or wildfire risk. The Victorian Environment Protection Authority issued alerts to 38 different industrial businesses warning them to lower their dust production.

== See also ==
- 2026 Australia heat wave
- 2009 southeastern Australia heat wave
- Angry Summer
