= David A. Jones =

Australian climatologist

David Jones
- Occupation: Climatologist
- Employer: Bureau of Meteorology
- Known for: Research on the impact of climate change on Australia
- Awards: National Australia Day Council Achievement Medallion

David Arfon Jones is a senior climatologist at the Australian Bureau of Meteorology.

He initially studied mathematics and chemistry at university but changed to atmospheric studies. Jones obtained his PhD in Earth Science from the University of Melbourne, Australia in 1995. He subsequently completed the postgraduate diploma in weather forecasting in 1995 at the Bureau of Meteorology. In 1995 Jones commenced work in the Climate Analysis Section of the Australian National Climate Centre, focusing on the automation of climate monitoring using objective analysis techniques. Subsequently he moved to the Bureau of Meteorology Research Centre in 1997 undertaking research on the variability and change of Australia's climate.

Jones became the supervisor of Climate Analysis at the Bureau of Meteorology in 2002. In this role he has promoted the automation of analysis, monitoring and forecasting products and the introduction of a range of innovative climate monitoring activities, with a focus on encouraging the interpretation of climate variability in the context of a rapidly changing climate.

Owing to the continued misrepresentation of climate change in the Australian media Jones has written a number of public pieces correcting or explaining climate change including in The Age, and in articles for the Australian Science Media Centre.

In 2006 Jones was awarded the National Australia Day Council Achievement Medallion.
