= 1993–94 Australian bushfire season =

- Date: October 1993 – January 1994
- Location: New South Wales and Queensland, Australia

Statistics
- Burned area: 70,000+ ha

Impacts
- Deaths: 3
- Injuries: 29+

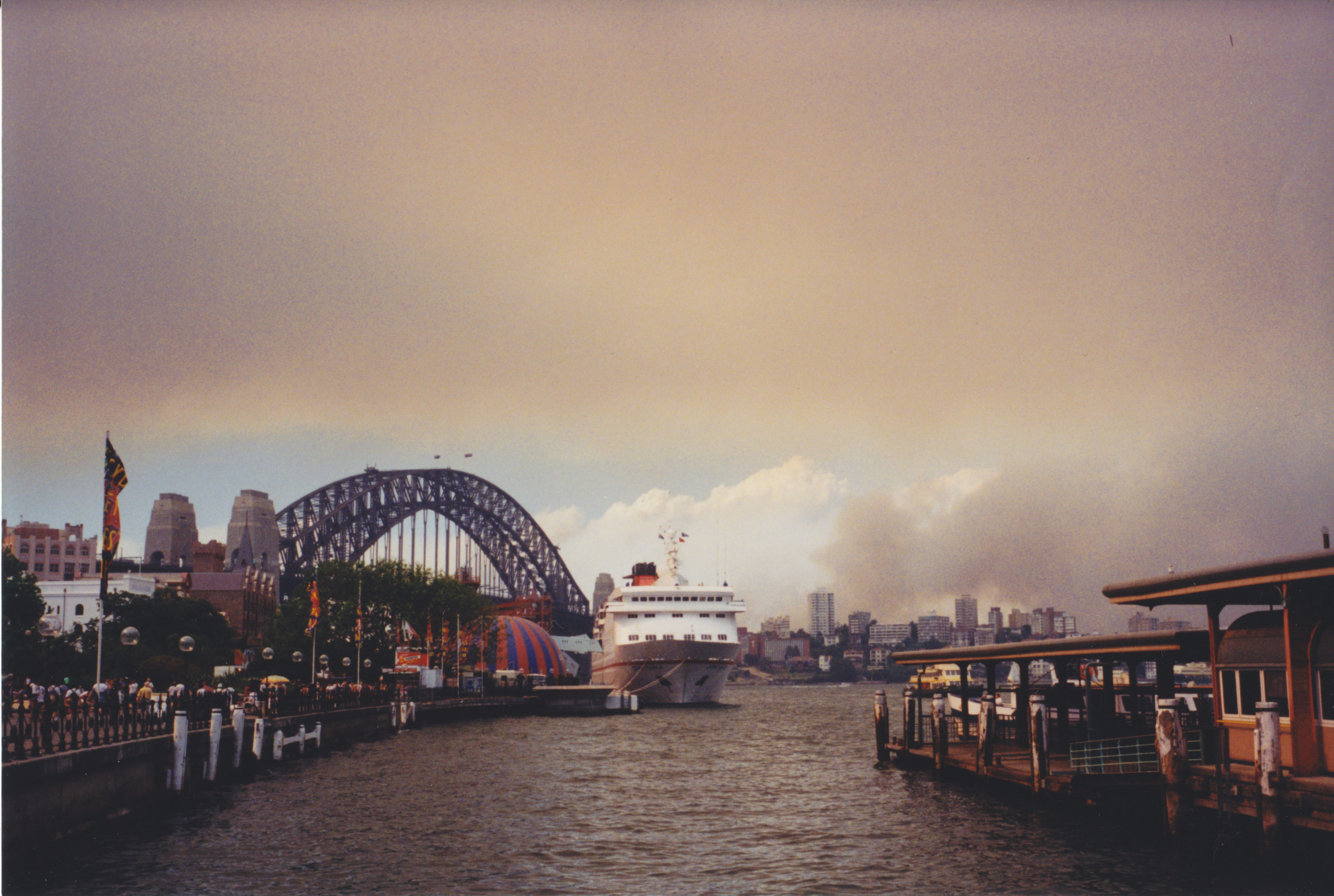
Sydney Bushfire smoke in January 1994

A major bushfire occurred in southern Queensland, Australia, in October 1993, and several major bushfires occurred in New South Wales from December 1993 to January 1994. 3 people were killed in New South Wales by the fires and more than 29 were injured. More than 70,000 ha were destroyed in New South Wales.

State	Start date	Deaths	Injuries	Houses lost	Area (ha)	Local govt.	Impacted communities & destruction	Duration	Ref.
Qld	10 October 1993			3		Somerset	Coominya & Esk: 4 caravans destroyed		
NSW	27 December 1993	1	4			Clarence Valley	Maclean		
NSW	30 December 1993			11	15,000 ha (37,000 acres)	Cessnock & Singleton	Bucketty: 16 non-residential structures, 4 caravans and 3 vehicles destroyed; A tourist railway damaged	17 days	
NSW	1 January 1994			5+	12,500 ha (31,000 acres)	Hornsby	Brooklyn, Canoelands & Wisemans Ferry: A garage and several non-residential buildings destroyed		
NSW	3 January 1994			24		Gosford	Cogra Bay, Kariong, Peats Ridge, Somersby & Tascott: Several non-residential structures destroyed, including a service station; 8 houses damaged	12 days	
NSW	3 January 1994	1		4		Lake Macquarie & Newcastle	Bennetts Green, Charlestown, Glendale & Wallsend: A retail property, a wrecking yard and several other non-residential structures destroyed; 8 houses damaged	11 days	
NSW	4 January 1994			5	50,000 ha (120,000 acres)	Blue Mountains & Hawkesbury	Hawkesbury Heights: 26 non-residential structures destroyed, including a youth hostel; 26 houses and 84 non-residential structures damaged	11 days	
NSW	5 January 1994			2	2,000 ha (4,900 acres)	Eurobodalla & Shoalhaven	Sussex Inlet	6 days	
NSW	6 January 1994		5+	17	370 ha (910 acres)	Willoughby & Ku-ring-gai	Macquarie Park, Chatswood West, West Killara & Lindfield: Ku-ring-gai College and at least 3 houses damaged		
NSW	6 January 1994			2		Port Stephens	—: 8 non-residential structures destroyed, including dog kennels; A timber factory damaged	8 days	
NSW	7 January 1994	1	20+	101	480 ha (1,200 acres)	Sutherland	Alfords Point, Bangor, Bonnet Bay, Como & Jannali: 14 non-residential structures destroyed, including Como West Presbyterian Church; 48 vehicles destroyed; 90 houses and 11 non-residential structures damaged, including Como West Public School	6 days	
NSW	7 January 1994			36	11,000 ha (27,000 acres)	Pittwater & Warringah	Bayview, Cromer, Elanora Heights, Elvina Bay, Ingleside, Lovett Bay & Warriewood: 4 non-residential structures destroyed, including a service station; 16 vehicles destroyed; 43 houses and 87 non-residential structures damaged	6 days	
