= 2021–22 Australian bushfire season =

Australian bushfires by season

- Date: August 2021 – January 2022
- Location: Australia

Impacts
- Deaths: 1
- Structures destroyed: 6

The 2021–22 Australian bushfire season was the season of summer bushfires in Australia. The outlook for the season was below average in parts of Eastern Australia thanks to a La Niña, with elevated fire danger in Western Australia. Higher than normal winter rainfall has resulted in above average to average stream flows and soil moisture levels through much of eastern Australia. The outlook to the end of spring was also for above average falls over much of the country apart for Western Australia. The Australian Capital Territory, Victoria and southern New South Wales are expected to have a below normal fire potential as a result of vegetation still recovering from the 2020–21 Australian bushfire season. Areas of south eastern Queensland, northern New South Wales and northern Western Australia expect an above normal fire potential caused by crop and grass growth in these areas.

== Fires by state or territory ==
=== Western Australia ===
On 26 November, a large bushfire in Broome caused an emergency warning to be issued throughout the day.

On 8 December, a bushfire near Margaret River threatened homes over a large area through Leeuwin-Naturaliste National Park. WA premier Mark McGowan urged people to leave the area as soon as possible due to high fuel loads and dangerous conditions. The fire burned through more than 3,200 ha (7,900 acres) by the following day. A second fire had also started further south near Yallingup damaging one house and threatening properties near Caves Road. The fires burned out an area close to 8,000 ha (20,000 acres) of bushland and has resulted in the closure of many tourist sites along Caves Road.

On 26 December, over 250 fire fighters were battling a large bushfire near Wooroloo that was burning through some 155 ha (380 acres) of regional parkland and farmland in the first two hours and was threatening Karakamia, the Australian Wildlife Conservancy's first sanctuary. One house and several sheds were lost and the fire was thought to have been deliberately lit by an arsonist. Another fire was burning in the south west to the north east of Margaret River in the Treeton and Osmington areas which burned out 100 ha (250 acres).

On 6 January, a fire burned through 4 ha (9.9 acres) of bushland on Mount Clarence less than 1 km (0.62 mi) from the central business district of Albany. The fire threatened homes but was extinguished the same day.

A fire started burning on 11 January around Eagle Bay and Dunsborough with over 220 ha (540 acres) of bushland consumed in the blaze. Over 150 fire-fighters were needed to combat the blaze which left Eagle Bay and Bunker Bay isolated with plans to evacuate holiday makers.

Families were evacuated from their house when a bushfire started on 4 February near the south coast town of Denmark, Western Australia in the area of Shadforth and William Bay National Park. Over 2,500 ha (6,200 acres) was burned out by the following day with 150 fire fighters and 16 aircraft combatting the fire. By 6 February, four homes were lost to the blaze with another being damaged, the fire had burned through 4,700 ha (12,000 acres) Another fire in Bridgetown also claimed a house in Hester on 6 February. Another fire started burning near Bruce Rock in catastrophic conditions. By 7 February the fire reached a length of approximately 35 km (22 mi).

Residents in Corrigin, Kulin and Kondinin were sheltered at home or evacuated when a bushfire moved through the area on 6 February burning 40,000 ha (99,000 acres) of bush needing over 70 fires to try to contain it. Several sheds were lost to the blaze.

=== Victoria ===
On 1 January, a blaze started in the Melbourne suburb of Maribyrnong. Another fire that started in South Australia on New Year's Eve crossed into Victoria on New Year's Day burning out forest and farmland. Areas around Poolaijelo, to the south-west of Edenhope had fire burning out of control causing the loss of thousands of sheep. Over 7,000 ha (17,000 acres) of land was burned out.

=== South Australia ===
On 19 January, a blaze started in the state's south east near Lucindale. The fire burnt out of control in a pine plantation. One firefighter Senior Firefighter Louise Hincks was killed and another firefighter was seriously injured after a tree fell on them. On February 8 Senior Firefighter Louise Hincks was farewelled by more than 600 family, friends and emergency services colleagues, including many in uniform, attended her funeral at the Adelaide Entertainment Centre where her husband, parents, brothers, daughters and colleagues paid tribute
