= 2016–17 Australian bushfire season =

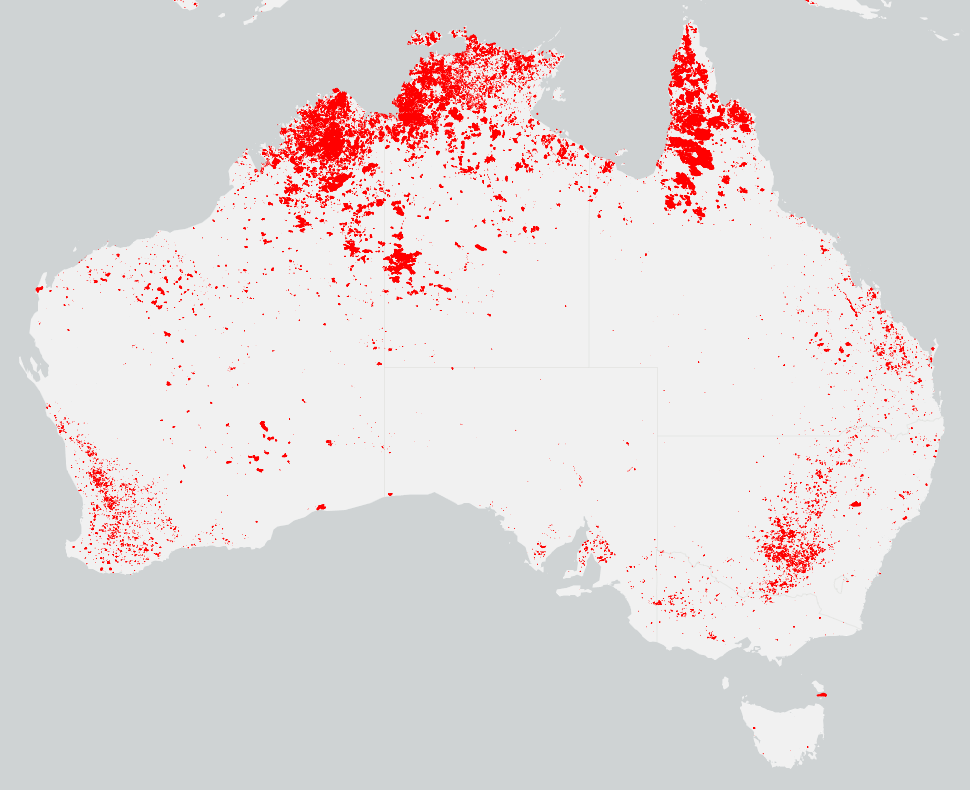
- NASA MODIS burned area detections from June 2016 to May 2017
- Date: June 2016 – June 2017
- Location: Australia

The summer of 2016–17 saw a very wet start with the fifth-wettest December on record being 76 percent above the average rainfall for the month across much of the country. This caused a significant surge in vegetation growth leading into the fire danger period.

== Significant fires ==
State	Start date	Deaths	Injuries	Res. houses lost	Other structures lost	Area (ha)	Local govt.	Impacted communities	Duration	Ref.
NSW	11 February 2017			35		52,000+ ha	Warrumbungle	Uarbry	3 days	
NSW	17 February 2017	0	0	11 destroyed; 12 damaged.		3,500 ha		Carwoola, Captains Flat	2 days	
WA	26 January 2017	0	0	0	2		Capel	Gwindinup Argyle		
WA	21 December 2016					2,000 ha	Gingin Dandaragen	Mimegarra Cataby Regans Ford Red Gully		
NSW						6,500	Port Stephens	Port Stephens		
VIC	5 Jan 2017					150		Kellalac		
VIC	24 Dec 2016					150		Bridgewater		
ACT	24 Jan 2017					2,450		Tarago		

== See also ==
- List of Australian bushfire seasons
