= 2023 Darling Downs fires =

Natural disaster in Australia

- Date: 23 October 2023 - 7 November 2023
- Location: Darling Downs, Queensland, Australia

Statistics
- Burned area: 27,000 acres (11,000 ha)
- Land use: Urban/rural fringe areas, farmland and forest reserves

Impacts
- Deaths: 2
- Injuries: Unknown
- Structures destroyed: 46 buildings destroyed
- Cost: Unknown

Ignition
- Cause: Undetermined

The 2023 Darling Downs fires was an Australian bushfire that began on 23 October 2023 after emergency warnings were issued for multiple bushfires in the Darling Downs region but particularly concentrated in the Western Downs Region and in Milmerran Woods. More than 40 fires burned across Darling Downs, with two fatalities in the town of Tara.

== Western Downs fires ==
On 23 October 2023, emergency warnings were issued for multiple bushfires burning in the Western Downs region, with calls to residents to evacuate the towns of Tara, Kogan and surrounding areas, with evacuation areas set up at the Western Downs Regional Council centre.

On 25 October, the winds changed the fire direction towards the township of Tara, forcing the evacuation centre there to be closed with 173 people to be evacuated to Dalby. The Tara fires maintained intensity over Wednesday with the front 15 kilometres from Tara, with firefighters attempting to create fire breaks. The body of a missing man was found near Tara, and a woman died at a house in Tara due to a suspected cardiac event.

On 27 October, more than 200 people were involved in fighting the Western Downs fires, in addition to 44 interstate firefighters involved. About 280 people were sheltering at evacuation centres in Dalby and Chinchilla, as well as reported looting in the region.

On 28 October, at 1 am on Saturday, QFES issued multiple emergency warnings for immediate evacuation of the towns of Tara, Wieambilla, and The Gums.

On 30 October, conditions deteriorated with strong westerly winds and high temperatures which worsened the fires, as well as 46 homes confirmed destroyed, 30 sheds, and 8 mobile homes.

== Southern Downs fires ==
On 31 October, emergency warnings to evacuate were issued for residents in the town of Wallangarra, as a new fire broke out in the Southern Downs. By 2:18 pm AEST, warnings were revised to seek immediate shelter as it was now too late for residents to leave.

== Reactions ==
=== Local and State ===
Queensland Premier Annastacia Palaszczuk, visited fire-affected residents sheltering in refuge centres in Dalby, and paid tribute to firefighters and communities stating; 'I want to thank once again all of those involved in helping our communities including interstate and New Zealand fire crews giving our own firefighters a much-needed break. Aircraft – including our LAT and New South Wales’ – are deployed where they can do the most good. Queensland’s arms continue to wrap around those who’ve lost everything in these fires.'
