= 2020–21 Australian bushfire season =

Fire season in Australia

- Date: August 2020 – June 2021
- Location: Australia

Impacts
- Deaths: 0
- Structures destroyed: 88

The 2020–21 Australian bushfire season was the season of summer bushfires in Australia. Following the devastating 2019–20 bushfires in Australia, authorities were urged to prepare early for the 2020–21 Australian bushfire season. The bushfire outlook for July to September 2020 was predicting a normal fire potential in Queensland with a good grass growth in many areas giving an increased risk of grass fires, an above normal season in the Kimberley region of Western Australia as a result of good rains from tropical cyclones, a normal but earlier season in the Northern Territory, an above normal season on the south coast of New South Wales and normal seasons elsewhere.

== Fires by state or territory ==
=== New South Wales ===
In mid-August 2020, a bushfire starting from a burn off quickly got out of control in grassy vegetation in the Duranbah region. The fire burned out around 180 ha (440 acres) of grass and swampland. It threatened the small community of Duranbah near the Queensland and New South Wales border.

On 10 October 2020, a bushfire began in the Royal National Park near Waterfall on Kangaroo Ridge, south of Sydney. The New South Wales Rural Fire Service (NSWRFS) believed this started due to a spot fire from a hazard reduction burn on the other side of the Princes Highway. The fire severely disrupted highway and railway traffic as both were halted that afternoon. As of 11 October, it was burning out of control in a north-easterly direction and was 286 ha (710 acres) in size. The Illawarra railway line was open and the highway operated at reduced speeds. The 'Marie Bashir', the NSWRFS's Boeing 737 Large Air Tanker water bombing aircraft was used to fight it on 10 and 11 October, the first time the aircraft was used this fire season.

On 23 November 2020, a bushfire flared to Watch and Act Level at Glenugie south of Grafton due to a short-lived heatwave which soared temperatures on the North and Far North Coastlines. It crossed the Pacific Highway and caused numerous spot fires adjacent to the Highway.

On 28 November 2020, severe fire danger warnings were in place for the Far North Coast, North Coast, Greater Hunter, Greater Sydney Region and North Western region. There was a very high fire danger for Illawarra, Shoalhaven, Central Ranges, New England and Northern Slopes. Total fire bans were in place in all those localities.

On 29 November 2020, three fires flared to Watch and Act level as a result of a heatwave of up to 40 °C (104 °F), and 90 km/h (56 mph) winds that had been wreaking havoc since 28 November. The first fire began in the suburb of Northmead, threatening homes there. Multiple RFS crews went to the area, and helicopters scooped water from the Parramatta River to douse flames. One home was fire damaged. By 3pm the fire was under control.

The second fire broke out in Faulconbridge, a suburb of the Blue Mountains, and quickly spread by 3 ha (7.4 acres).

The third fire broke out near Kenthurst in Sydney's Northwest.

=== Northern Territory ===
Sixteen fires during the dry season in the Northern Territory followed two record-breaking dry wet seasons meaning that vegetation was drying faster and earlier. The presence of gamba grass, introduced in the 1930s, in the savannah is also problematic with the grass being more combustible than native species.

=== Queensland (Fraser Island) ===
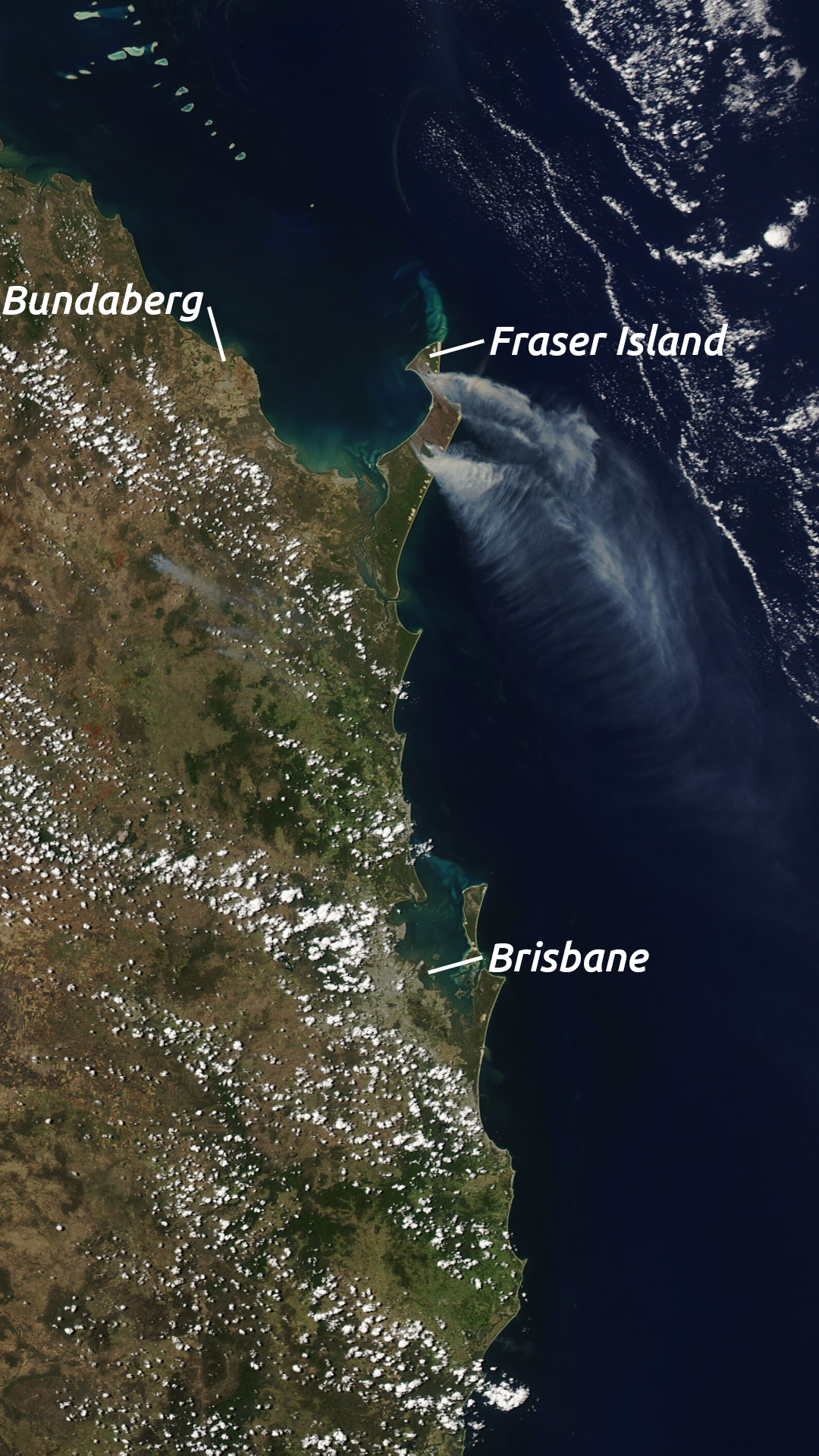
NASA satellite imagery on 14 November 2020 showing bushfires on Fraser Island

A large bushfire was started on 14 October 2020 by an illegal campfire within the Duling Camp Zone of Eastern Beach on Fraser Island. It impacted multiple communities and caused people to flee their homes as it burned out of control.

In early December interstate assistance, including from the New South Wales Rural Fire Service who provided a Boeing 737-300 Large Air Tanker waterbombing aircraft, was used to fight the fire as Happy Valley township was threatened. Early in the morning (3:35am) the Queensland Fire & Emergency Services (QFES) issued an emergency warning in which residents were advised to "leave immediately". High temperatures of 32 °C (90 °F), and strong winds hindered fire fighting and QFES Director Brian Cox said "A lot of this fire is burning in inaccessible country ...".

Heavy rainfall in mid-December helped contain the fire and the QFES was able to hand control back to the Queensland Parks & Wildlife Service (QPWS). This was the longest burning fire this fire season up to 14 December 2020 as it had been burning since October, over two months, and as of that date, more than half the island had been "blackened" by fire. The fire was still burning, but the island was safe for visitors though some walking trails and areas were still restricted for safety. The island reopened on 15 December.

The area burnt by the fire was estimated at 87,000 hectares (210,000 acres). It is expected that the burned areas will successfully regenerate.

Four men, aged 21 to 24, were charged over the bushfire and on 21 January 2021 at Hervey Bay Magistrates Court two of the four pled guilty to one count each of "unlawfully lighting a fire and leaving a fire unattended", were fined A$667 on each offence, and did not have a conviction recorded. The other two were charged with "unlawfully lighting a fire" but had their cases adjourned to 11 February. A 17-year-old minor was allegedly involved, but not charged and is instead being dealt with through the Youth Justice Act due to his age.

=== South Australia ===
On 10 November, a series of Bushfires took place due to hot and windy conditions contributing to Severe Thunderstorms mainly in the Yorke Peninsula. As of 11:20 pm ACDT there were 63 power outages affecting over 23,000 customers and over 100 incidents the South Australian Country Fire Service had attended throughout the day. This comes after the first Total Fire Bans were issued for South Australia for the first time in the 2020–21 Australian bushfire season.

At 12:48 pm ACDT on 27 November, the South Australian Country Fire Service responded to a grass fire at Templers in the State's Mid North. Shortly after arriving the CFS declared an Emergency Warning and ordered people around Templers, Freeling, Lyndoch and Roseworthy to evacuate. Just after 3pm the fire was declared contained.

At 12:37 pm ACDT on 11 January, an out-of-control bushfire raged in the Lower South East of South Australia near the township of Lucindale. As of 2:36 pm 12 January over 14,000 ha of grass and scrub was burnt. After having over 200 firefighters working around the clock, the fire threat has reduced and contained with help from the Victorian Country Fire Authority.

At 4:15 pm ACDT on 24 January, a bushfire took hold at Cherry Gardens under Extreme weather conditions, located in the Adelaide Hills. At 4:36pm the first Emergency Warning was issued for people living on Hicks Hill Road, Orchard Road, Lewis Street and Prith Road, soon towns were being notified to evacuate as the fire raged out-of-control towards homes that would pose a threat to lives in its path. As of 7:15pm on 25 January the fire was declared Contained after heavy rain improved the firefighting conditions. Four months later a 61-year-old man was charged with starting the fires.

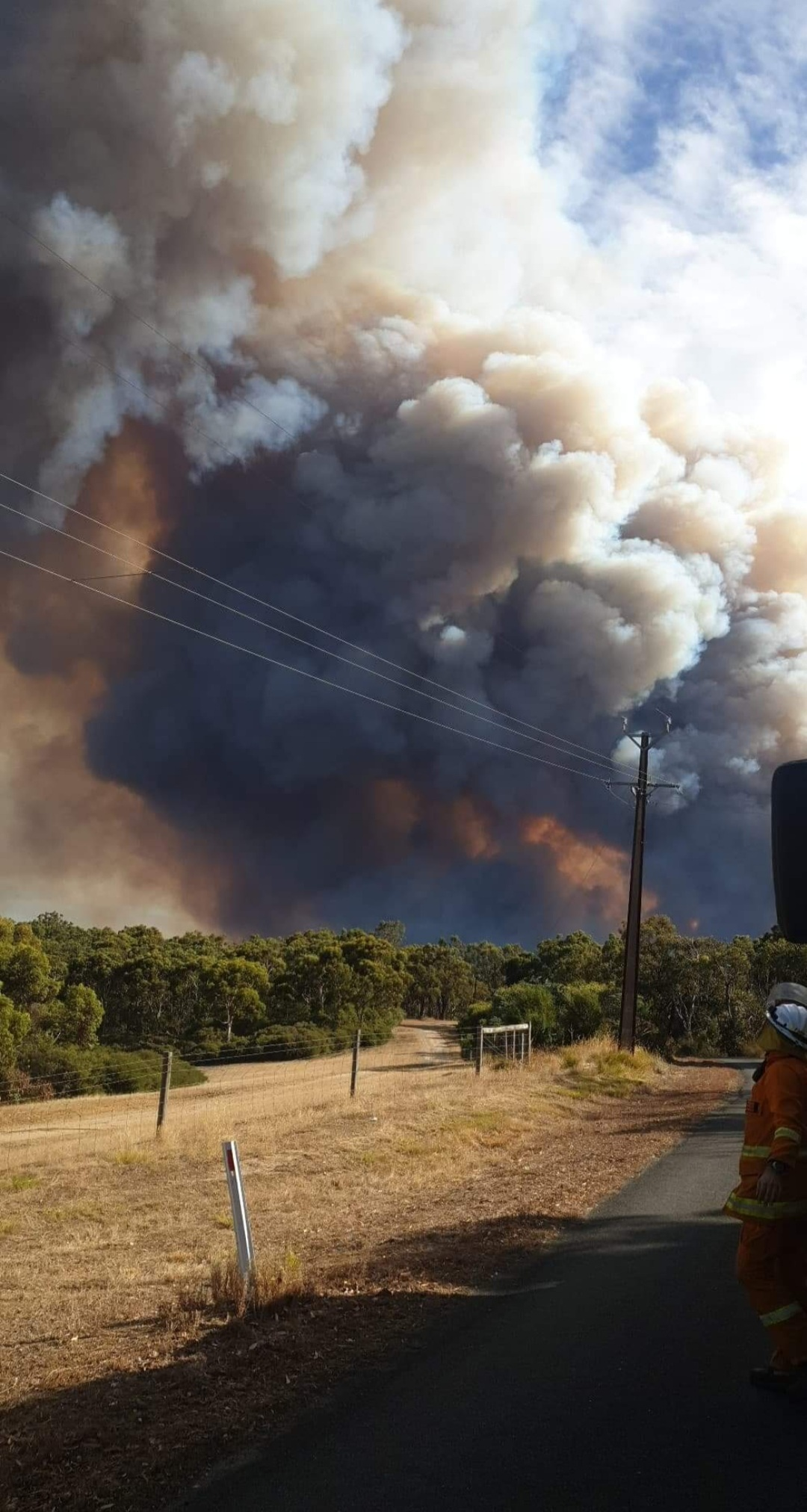
Cherry Gardens Fire on 24 January

=== Western Australia ===
A Bushfire Emergency Warning was declared for the City of Swan on 24 December with 5 ha (12 acres) of land being burnt.

A bushfire started burning on 2 January in areas to the north of Perth. By 5 January, a total area of 2,000 ha (4,900 acres) of bushland had been burned out and properties threatened in Gingin and Dandaragan with residents of Ocean Farms Estate being ordered to evacuate and farmers east of Lancelin also encouraged to leave. By 7 January, 10,000 ha (25,000 acres) of land over the Gingin and Dandaragan shires had been burned with 200 fire fighters combating the blaze.

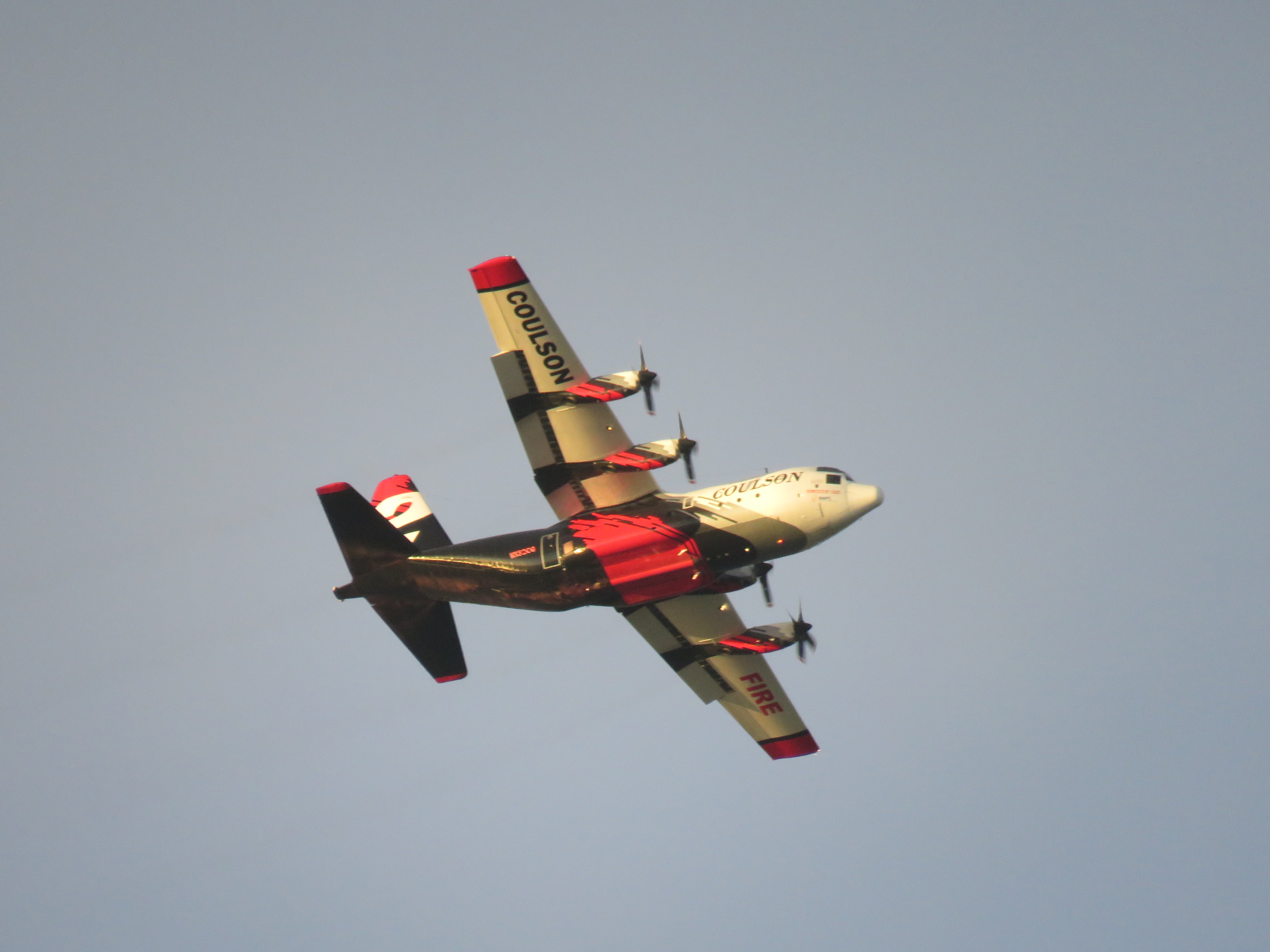
A Lockheed C-130H engaged in fighting the Kwinana bushfire

On 3 January a dangerous bushfire began in Postans and quickly spread through bushland in The Spectacles, Hope Valley and Kwinana Beach, putting industrial buildings and the Kwinana Oil Refinery at risk, as well as Perth Motorplex. Strong winds made the fire hard to control, but it was downgraded to a watch and act on 4 January.

A bushfire in High Wycombe, a suburb in the east of Perth, on 15 January and burned through about 4 ha (9.9 acres) of bushland requiring some 75 firefighters to contain it. Another fire was also burning in York on 15 January resulting in the loss of one home and shed on a hobby farm near the Great Southern Highway.

Another fire started burning on 16 January in a nature reserve in the suburb of Oakford in Perth's southern suburbs resulting in the closure of Kwinana Freeway between Mortimer and Anketell Roads and the loss of one house. Approximately 150 fire fighters and 50 vehicles along with aerial bombers were required to combat the blaze. Over 100 ha (250 acres) of bushland was burned out.

On 1 February 2021, the 2021 Wooroloo bushfire started at Werribee Road, Wooroloo. Over 500 fire fighters and 90 fire trucks were required to battle the fire and spread to parts of Wundowie, Gidgegannup and Chidlow. More than three houses, outbuildings and two fire trucks were destroyed. The fire remained uncontrollable overnight, and reached ground just east of The Vines by mid morning on the following day, by that stage it had a 60 km perimeter and was 7000 hectares in size. At lunch time on 3 February it was confirmed that 71 houses had been lost, with areas of Bullsbrook and Shady hills in Perth's north advised to evacuate due to predicted wind changes combined with steep terrain that is inaccessible to vehicles. By 6 February it had destroyed at least 86 houses and 2 fire trucks and burned out an area of over 10,500 ha (26,000 acres).

On 5 February, two new bushfires in the South West were ignited, one near Injidup and the other near Yallingup, with one thought to have been deliberately lit. 100 firefighters were needed to control the fires which were 11 km (6.8 mi) apart, with the Yallingup fire coming close to Ngilgi Cave.

== See also ==
- List of Australian bushfire seasons
