= 2004–05 Australian bushfire season =

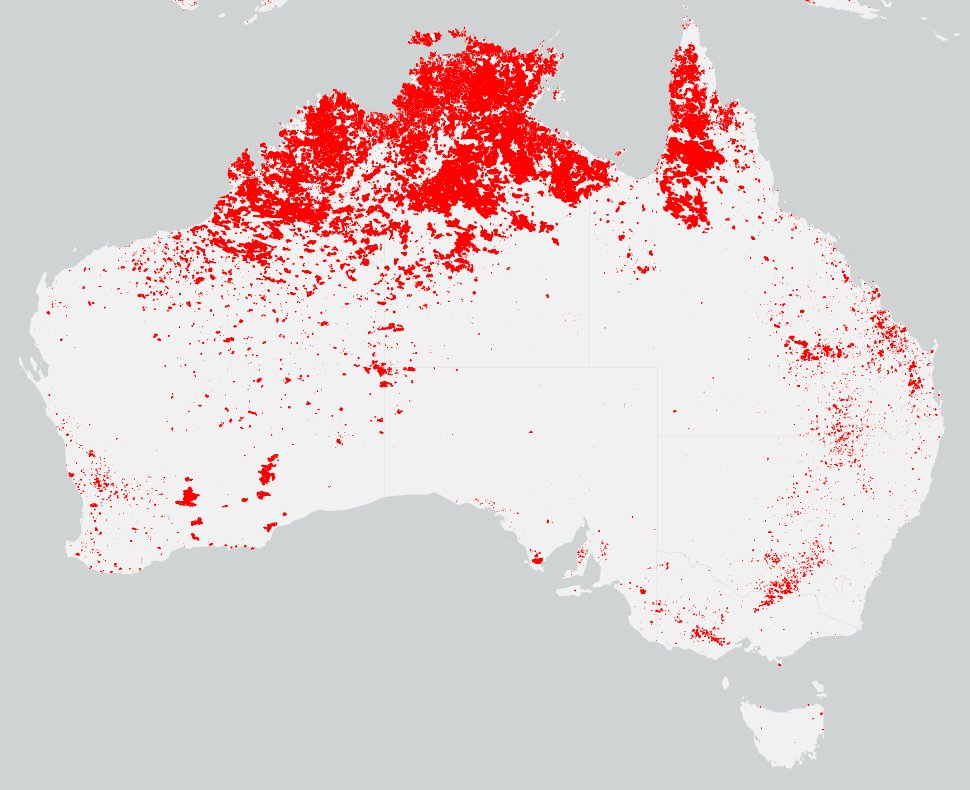
- NASA MODIS burned area detections from June 2004 to May 2005
- Date: Winter (June) 2004 – Autumn (May) 2005
- Location: Australia

Impacts
- Structures destroyed: 450+ total: 103 houses; 350+ non-residential structures

State	Start date	Deaths	Injuries	Houses lost	Area (ha)	Local govt.	Impacted communities & destruction	Duration	Ref.
QLD	30 September 2004	1				Townsville	Black River: A volunteer firefighter perishes		
QLD	8 October 2004		2	6		Toowoomba	Crows Nest: Several non-residential structures and cars destroyed		
QLD	8 October 2004			2	3,000 ha (7,400 acres)	Lockyer Valley	Helidon		
WA	2 December 2004		1	2	13,000 ha (32,000 acres)	Dumbleyung	Tincurrin & Kukerin: 2,500 head of livestock perish		
SA	10 January 2005	9	115	93	78,000 ha (190,000 acres)	Lower Eyre Peninsula	Wangary, North Shields, Louth Bay, Yallunda Flat & Wanilla: Nine civilians perish; 340 non-residential structures, 139 items of farm machinery, 45 vehicles, 15 caravans at North Shields caravan park, 4 boats, 3 cabins, 3 vans, 2 buses, a shop and a museum destroyed; 47,000 head of livestock perish	2 days	
