= 2022–23 Australian bushfire season =

- Date: November 2022 – April 2023
- Location: Australia

Impacts
- Deaths: 0
- Structures lost: 39

The 2022–23 Australian bushfire season was the season of summer bushfires in Australia. The outlook for the season was below average in coastal parts of south-eastern Australia due to high rainfall associated with the continued La Niña climatic pattern. Elevated fire danger was forecast in Central Australia, inland New South Wales, western Tasmania, southern Queensland and Western Australia, particularly toward the end of the season where drier weather and high fuel loads were expected.

== Fires by state or territory ==
=== New South Wales ===
In early March 2023, lightning strikes ignited the Alpha Road Tambaroora blaze in the Central West region of the state, near Hill End. The fire burnt out 18,000 hectares, destroyed six homes and five buildings. Around 200 head of livestock were lost.

On March 16, a vehicle driving through long grass sparked the Curraweela Bushfire north of Crookwell in the Southern Tablelands. The fire burnt over 4,400 hectares, destroyed one home and 17 buildings. Three further homes damaged and close to 100 livestock lost.

=== Tasmania ===
On 27 December 2022, a small yet fierce fire close to the town of Rosebery destroyed a hostel accommodation building.

=== Northern Territory ===
In March 2023, a large fire in the MacDonnell Ranges (Tjoritja) region of Central Australia, burnt out around 100,000 hectares including 20% of the Tjoritja / West MacDonnell National Park. Conservationists called it an environmental tragedy that was fuelled by climate change and the overgrowth of the invasive buffel grass weed.

=== Queensland ===
From 30 January to 24 March 2023, the Western Downs bushfires burnt over 150,000 hectares of land, destroying around 20 buildings.

=== Western Australia ===
In February 2023, a series of bushfires sparked by lightning burnt across a large section of southern Western Australia. A Boeing 737 that was converted into a fire-fighting aircraft, crashed while conducting operations to control a fire near Hopetoun. While the plane was destroyed, the two pilots on board managed to walk away with only minor injuries. This was the first ever hull loss of a Boeing 737 to occur in Australia.
