= Chatsbury bushfires =

1965 bushfires in New South Wales, Australia

Chatsbury / Bungonia bushfires
- Date: 5 to 14 March 1965
- Location: Southern Highlands region of New South Wales, Australia
- Coordinates: 34°32′57″S 149°49′02″E

Statistics
- Burned area: 250,000 hectares (620,000 acres)
- Land use: Residential; Rural grazing; Orchards

Impacts
- Deaths: 3
- Structures lost: 59

The Chatsbury/Bungonia bushfires of 1965 was a series of bushfires that burned from 5 to 14 March 1965 in the Southern Highlands region of New South Wales, Australia. The fires destroyed the villages of Tallong, Wingello, and most of the surrounding orchards.

The fire is thought to be ignited by a spark from a Chatsbury Station angle grinder. It quickly spread and covered 250,000 hectares (620,000 acres) and destroyed the areas' livestock. It is thought to be the greatest disaster in the area.

Three people were killed. 28 homes were destroyed in Tallong, 31 in Wingello. The fire was eventually stopped (or burnt out) near Nowra on the NSW South Coast.
