= 2006 Junee Bushfire =

Bushfire in New South Wales, Australia

Junee Bushfire
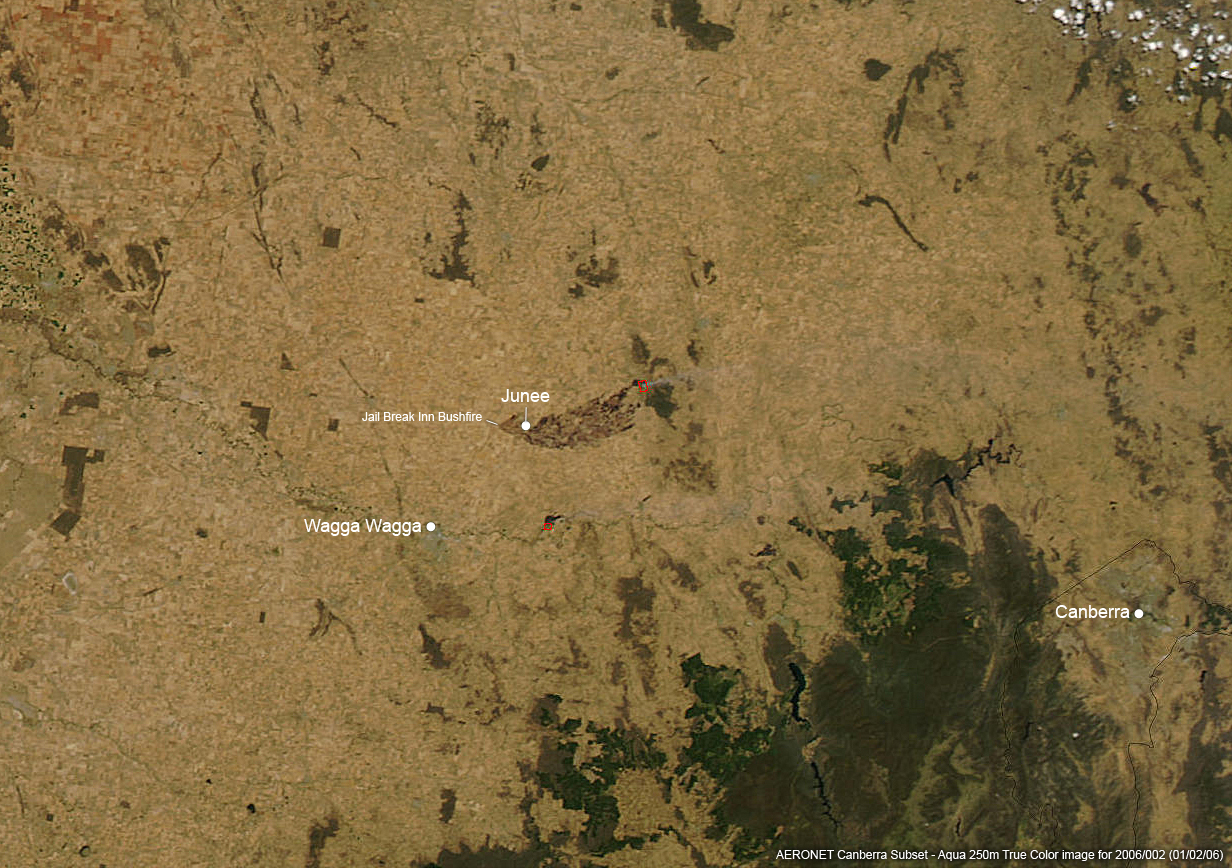
- Date: 1 January 2006 – 6 January 2006
- Location: Junee, New South Wales, Australia
- Coordinates: 34°51′52″S 147°30′01″E

Statistics
- Burned area: More than 25,200 hectares (62,000 acres)
- Land use: Residential; Farmland; Forest reserves

Impacts
- Injuries: 1
- Structures destroyed: 14+ — 10 houses — 4 shearing sheds — numerous non-residential buildings

Ignition
- Cause: Discarded cigarette butt.

The 2006 Junee bushfire, officially referred to as the "Jail Break Inn fire", was a bushfire that burned from 1–6 January and primarily affected the Riverina region in the Australian state of New South Wales. At least 25,200 hectares (62,000 acres) of farmland and forest reserve in the municipality of Junee Shire were burned during the 6-day duration of the fire. Ten houses, four shearing sheds and numerous other vehicles and non-residential buildings were destroyed, and damage was also caused to the Junee Round House. Rural industry in the Junee area was also significantly affected by the fire; over 20,000 head of livestock perished or were put down due to fire related injuries, 20 hectares (49 acres) of unharvested crops were burned and 1,500 kilometres (930 mi) of fencing was damaged. The fire affected 200 properties in and around the communities of Bethungra, Eurongilly, Illabo, Junee and Old Junee.

The Jail Break Inn fire is suspected to have been ignited at approximately 13:00 AEDT (UTC+11) by a cigarette butt discarded on the roadside near the Jail Break Inn, 8 kilometres (5.0 mi) west of the Junee township. During the major run of the fire that afternoon, John Heffernan, a local farmer and second cousin of Liberal senator Bill Heffernan, received third-degree burns to 60–80% of his body while trying to fight the fire.

== Climate and weather setting ==
On the morning of 1 January, the NSW Rural Fire Service issued a warning that temperatures would "...reach 43 degrees in some parts of the state, winds will gust up to 60 km/h from the northwest and humidity is expected to drop below 15 percent". A statewide total fire ban had already been declared from midnight 30 December 2005 to midnight 1 January 2006 in preparation for the severe conditions, and farmers in the south west of the state, including the Riverina region, were warned to stop harvesting crops to prevent machinery starting fires in paddocks.

1 January 2006 was the hottest day of the year across much of New South Wales, including at Wilcannia, which observed the highest daily maximum temperature recorded in the state all year at 47.3 °C (117.1 °F). The day also witnessed the 5th hottest day ever recorded at Observatory Hill in Sydney, as the temperature reached 44.2 °C (111.6 °F). In the Riverina, Wagga Wagga—approx. 35 kilometres (22 mi) south of Junee—observed a temperature of 44.6 °C (112.3 °F), while Gundagai—approx. 50 kilometres (31 mi) Southeast of Junee—observed 43.1 °C (109.6 °F).

== Fire timeline ==
At approximately 13:00 AEDT (UTC+11) the NSW Rural Fire Service received a call about a fire burning in a lucerne paddock near the Jail Break Inn, a café on the intersection of the Olympic Highway and Goldfields Way, 8 kilometres (5.0 mi) west of the Junee township. The prevailing winds caused the fire front to spread rapidly east towards Junee township over the next hour, and many residents were evacuated to Junee Bowling Club; it was during the two hours following 14:00 AEDT (UTC+11) that the majority of residential property was destroyed in and around the southern vicinity of Junee township, and the fire front jumped Harefield Rd. Some time after 16:00 AEDT (UTC+11), a cold front with predominantly southerly winds passed through the fire ground, prompting the fire front to move in a more northerly direction, towards Illabo. During the first 9 hours, the fire had spread 38 kilometres (24 mi) from the point of ignition and prompted the closure of the Olympic Highway and the Main Southern Railway line.

On 3 January, Junee Shire was declared a natural disaster zone, pursuant to the State Natural Disaster Relief and Recovery Arrangements, and those affected were able to claim assistance funding.
