= Linton Bushfire =

Natural disaster in Victoria, Australia

Coordinates: 37°40′45.07″S 143°33′37.26″E

The Linton Bushfire was a wildfire that burned through private land and state forests near the township of Linton, Victoria, Australia on 2 December 1998. Firefighters from the Victorian state government's Department of Natural Resources and Environment and the Country Fire Authority (CFA) were deployed to put out the fire. At approximately 8.45pm, two firefighting appliances and their crews were entrapped and engulfed in fire following an unexpected wind change. The bushfire covered a maximum land of 660 hectares of private and public land.

== Accident ==
The crew of one of those appliances, five men from Geelong, who were all volunteers from the Geelong West Fire Brigade were killed.

The coronial inquest examining the fire and the deaths, was one of the longest-running inquests in the history of the state. It was this inquest, that led to changes in safety operating procedures in the SA Country Fire Service and Victorian Country Fire Authority, relating to the Dead Man Zone.

== Firefighters ==
The five Geelong West volunteer firefighters that died in the Linton fire were Christopher Evans, Garry Vredeveldt, Stuart Davidson, Jason Thomas and Matthew Armstrong.

A memorial for the firefighters was placed in West Park, Geelong West. Another one was put in Linton, Victoria.

Grovedale College, who lost a former pupil in the fire, instituted an award named after Jason Thomas, for the student who has best served the community.

== See also ==
- List of disasters in Australia by death toll
