= Pulletop bushfire =

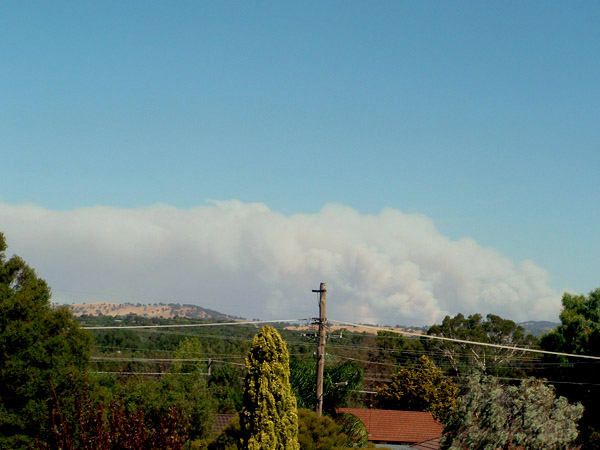
- The Pulletop bushfire as seen from Wagga Wagga
- Date: 6 February 2006 – 19 February 2006
- Location: Pulletop, Riverina, New South Wales, Australia
- Coordinates: 35°30′39″S 147°26′48″E

Statistics
- Burned area: 9,000 hectares (22,000 acres)
- Land use: Farmland

Ignition
- Cause: Spark from a tractor

Map
- Location of the fire in New South Wales

The Pulletop bushfire, officially referred to as the Wandoo fire, started on 6 February 2006 in hot dry and windy weather conditions approximately 30 kilometres (19 mi) southeast of Wagga Wagga in the Australian state of New South Wales. The fire was thought to have been started by sparks from a tractor on a property at Pulletop which quickly got out of control. The New South Wales Rural Fire Service declared a bushfire emergency and the Hume Highway was closed late in the afternoon with fears that the fire would threaten the towns of Humula, Book Book, Livingstone and Kyeamba after 10 square kilometres (3.9 sq mi) of farmland was burnt. By 7 February 2006 milder conditions helped firefighters to control the fire burning in inaccessible country.

== Overview ==
Over 9,000 hectares (22,000 acres) of farmland was burnt and the following damage reported:

- 2,500 sheep killed
- 6 cattle killed
- 3 vehicles destroyed
- 2 hay sheds destroyed
- 50 kilometres (31 mi) of fencing burnt
- Pine plantations worth A$5 million were destroyed, including a communications installation
- A natural disaster was declared

== Gallery ==
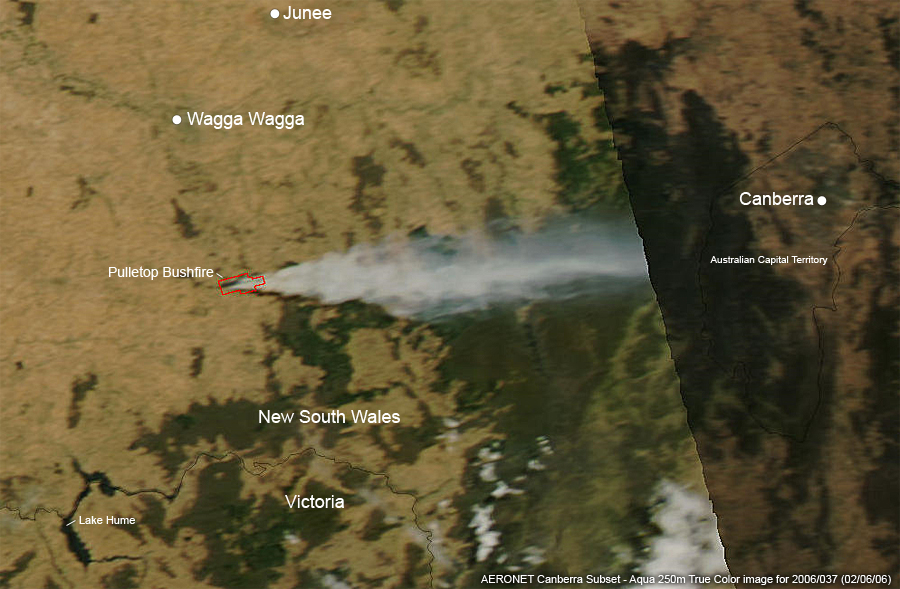
MODIS Aqua satellite image of the bushfire on 6 February 2006.

== See also ==
- Bushfires in Australia
