= 2015 Sampson Flat bushfires =

Bushfire in the 2014–15 Australian bushfire season

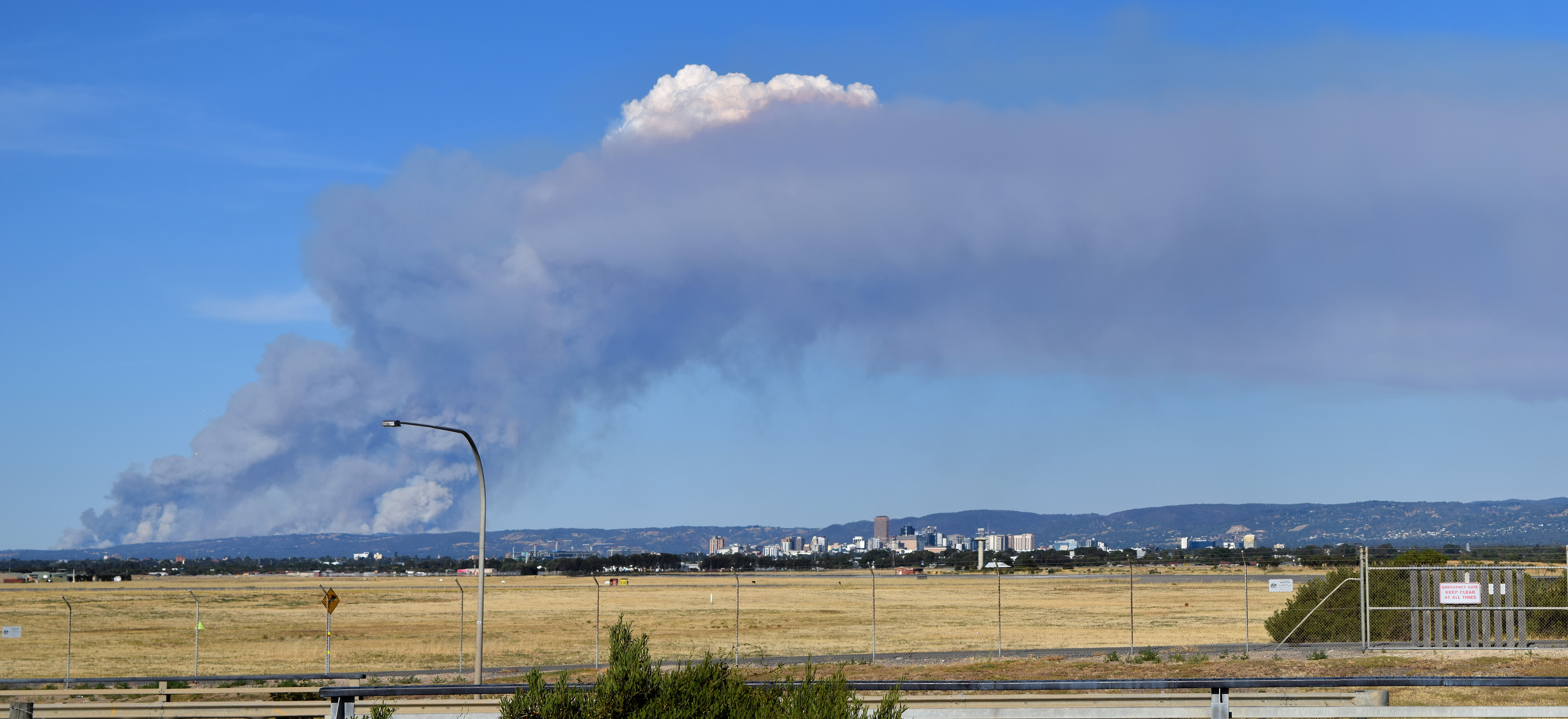
- A plume of smoke emerging from the Adelaide Hills region during the bushfires, 2 January 2015. The Adelaide city centre is the cluster of buildings visible centre right.
- Date: 2 January 2015 – 9 January 2015
- Location: Southern Mount Lofty Ranges, South Australia
- Coordinates: 34°45′S 138°47′E

Statistics
- Burned area: more than 20,000 hectares (49,000 acres)
- Land use: Residential; Farmland; Conservation parks; Forest reserves

Impacts
- Deaths: 0
- Injuries: 134
- Structures destroyed: 27 houses; 140 outbuildings
- Cost: A$13 million

Map
- Location in South Australia

The 2015 Sampson Flat fires were a series of bushfires in the Australian state of South Australia; predominantly the northern Adelaide Hills and the outer Adelaide metropolitan area. The fires began on 2 January 2015 and lasted until 9 January 2015; and burnt more than 20,000 hectares (49,000 acres).

== Overview ==
The fires began in a semi rural area to the north east of the city, in the locality of Sampson Flat. They later traveled southeast towards the Kersbrook township and across the Mount Lofty Ranges.As of 6 January 2015, at least 26 houses were destroyed with 37 families in temporary accommodation. This count had increased to 38 houses, 125 outbuildings and 134 injuries by the evening of 6 January. The area around Kersbrook was worst hit, with twelve houses destroyed. On 7 January, the number of houses destroyed throughout the affected area was revised down from 38 to 32 and again down to 27 a few days later. There were no fatalities as a result of the bushfires; and the total cost was estimated to be more than A$13 million.

At the same time, a smaller fire threat was posed near Tantanoola and Glencoe in the Limestone Coast region on 2 January 2015.

== Background ==
2014 was Australia's sixth-warmest year since national temperature observations commenced in 1910. Following Australia's warmest year on record in 2013, both maximum and minimum temperatures remained well above average, with frequent periods of abnormally warm weather throughout the year. For the 6-month period from July to December 2014 southeast South Australia recorded the lowest 5 per cent record of rainfall deficiencies, extending a continued pattern of severe rainfall deficiencies over a 27-month period.

On 1 January 2015 a fire weather warning and total fire ban were issued across most of South Australia as the Bureau of Meteorology estimated the temperature in Adelaide would peak at 42 °C (108 °F), with temperatures throughout the north-west of the state and stretching down to the Eyre Peninsula estimated to range between 43–46 °C (109–115 °F) on that day. On 2 January the temperature in Adelaide peaked at 44.1 °C (111.4 °F), approximately 20 °C (36 °F) degrees above the average December temperature for Adelaide while the following day reached 38.2 °C (100.8 °F), which further aggravated conditions.

== Chronology ==
The Sampson Flat fire was declared to be a major emergency at 08:30 on 3 January 2015, giving the South Australia Police and emergency services additional authority to manage the event and control access in and out of the area. Over thirty roadblocks limited access to the fireground to anybody not involved in the emergency response. Residents started to be allowed back in from 6 January, with their identity and address being checked to limit access to only the roads that had been cleared as safe for travel. Road clearing was suspended on the afternoon of 7 January due to the wind and thunderstorms making the activity unsafe for the cleanup crews. The major emergency declaration was rescinded at 3pm on 7 January, despite it being able to remain in force for 14 days.

The weather assisted to contain the fire on Sunday and Monday 4–5 January with mild winds and temperatures in the range of 30–34 °C (86–93 °F), but daily temperatures rose again on Tuesday and Wednesday 6–7 January, with forecast maximum temperature in the range of 35–39 °C (95–102 °F) on both days.

Thunderstorms on the afternoon of 7 January produced a spate of new grass fires from lightning, but also brought cooler temperatures, increased humidity, and rain over some parts of the fireground, making it easier to control and extinguish the remaining areas. In the early morning hours of Thursday 8 January, the South Australian Country Fire Service confirmed on its website that the fire had been completely brought under control with crews remaining on the ground to extinguish the remaining hot spots. Extensive rainfall across South Eastern Australia on 9 and 10 January significantly reduced the fire risk.

== Response ==
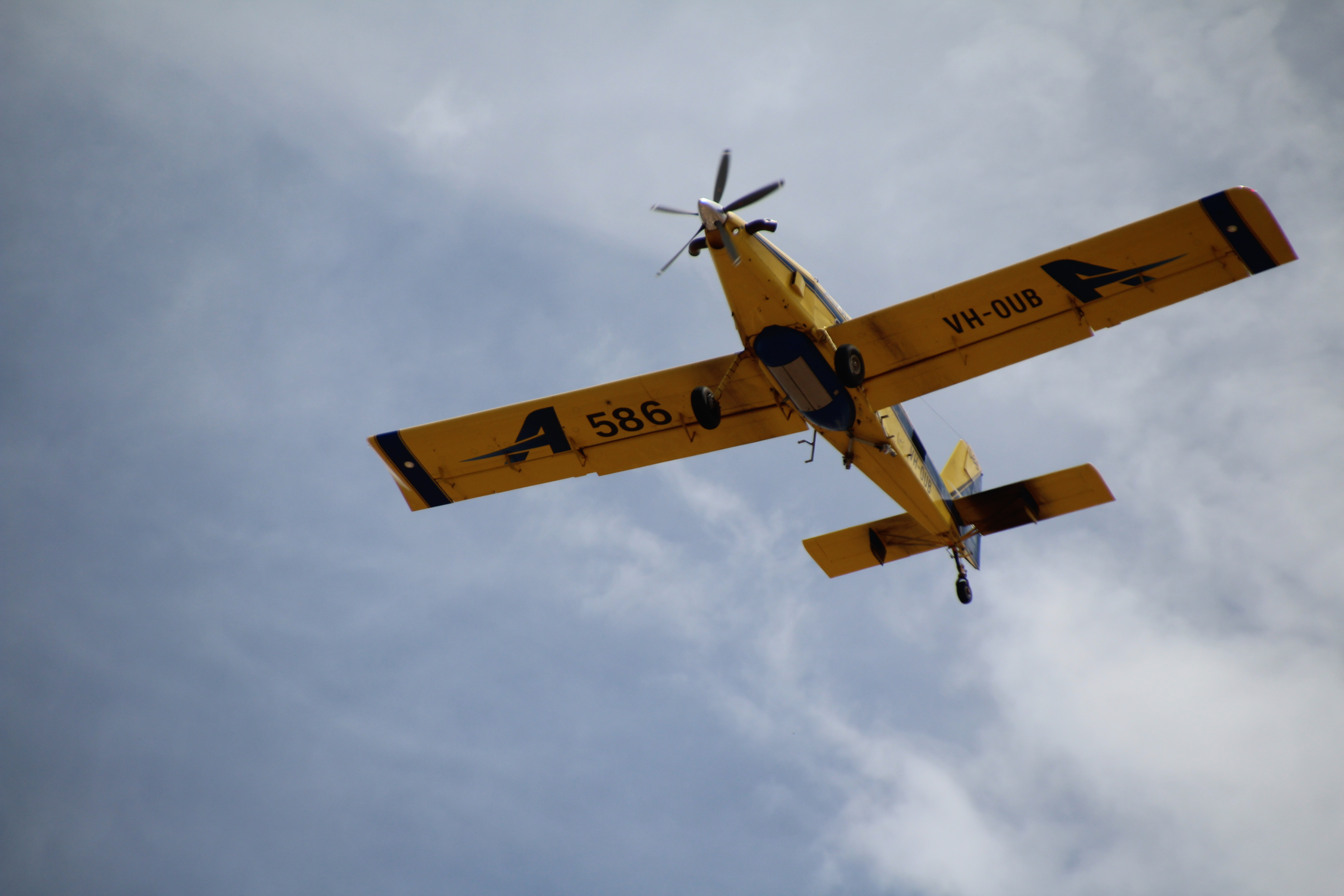
Air Tractor AT-802A on its way to deliver another load of fire retardant on 3 January.

Over 700 South Australian Country Fire Service volunteers were involved in fighting the fire, supplemented by teams from the New South Wales Rural Fire Service and Victorian Country Fire Authority. A record number of 31 aircraft were available to assist in fighting the fire.

The hospital at Mount Pleasant was evacuated of all patients, and the hospital at Gumeracha partially evacuated and closed to new patients due to the impacts of the fire, including that the staff needed to be attending to their own homes and families, and relief staff could not get in.

The Prime Minister, Tony Abbott, together with the Premier, Jay Weatherill, visited parts of the damaged area in the Adelaide Hills on 7 January 2015 and announced that victims of the bushfires shall be entitled to receive disaster recovery payments via Centrelink. The South Australian government also announced a relief package.

Relief packages were offered by a number of financial institutions including the ANZ Bank, BankSA, Bendigo Bank, the Commonwealth Bank, the National Australia Bank, Suncorp, and Westpac.

The Government of South Australia activated the South Australian Emergency Relief Fund and called for donations to the Sampson Flat Bushfire Relief Appeal. The Commonwealth Bank, Westpac and Bank SA agreed to accept donations in their retail branches. Additionally, the Commonwealth Bank donated $500,000 to the appeal; and BHP Billiton donated $250,000 as well as agreeing to donate two dollars for every one dollar donated by BHP Billiton's employees. The Australian Red Cross established the Red Cross Disaster Relief and Recovery fund and delivered disaster assistance from two relief centres established by Housing SA. RSPCA South Australia also called for donations to assist the people and animals affected by the bushfires emergency.

== Likely cause and damage ==
An early theory for the source of the fire was a backyard incinerator started by a resident on Shillabeer Road in Sampson Flat. At the conclusion of investigations the official cause of the fire was unknown, although police were confident it started within or adjacent to an incinerator. Incinerators are banned in Adelaide suburbs but are legal in rural areas outside the suburbs of Adelaide. The resident of the home where the incinerator was located said a dam pump on the property was not operational until he fixed it two weeks ago and that an irrigation pipe, which was burnt in the fire, was laid on the ground rather than buried underneath.

The fires are the worst to affect the Adelaide Hills region since the 1983 Ash Wednesday bushfires, which was caused by years of drought and extreme heat. In addition to the significant fire in the Adelaide Hills, there was also a major fire in the south east of South Australia, and several in Victoria at the same time. The two large water bombers were based in Victoria at Avalon Airport south of Melbourne, but moved for several days to RAAF Base Edinburgh in northern Adelaide at the height of the fire. From either base, they were flying sorties to both South Australia and to western Victoria.

The fire in total had blackened more than 12,500 hectares (31,000 acres) of forest and grazing land, including 35 hectares (86 acres) of vineyards stretching a total perimeter of 224 kilometres (139 mi). A number of native wildlife, livestock and family pets perished in the blaze.

== See also ==
- Bushfires in Australia
- List of Australian bushfire seasons
