= Mount Lubra bushfire =

2006 bushfire in Victoria, Australia

- Location: The Grampians in, Victoria, Australia

Statistics
- Burned area: 184,000 hectares (450,000 acres)
- Land use: National park; rural land

Impacts
- Deaths: 2
- Structures destroyed: 25 homes; 50 sheds and outbuildings; 1,500 kilometres (930 mi) of fencing; 62,500 livestock

Ignition
- Cause: Lightning strike

The Mount Lubra bushfire, also called the Mount Warrinaburb bushfire, was a bushfire, started by a lightning strike, that burnt approximately 184,000 hectares (450,000 acres) from late on 19 January 2006 until mid-February 2006 near The Grampians in, Victoria, Australia.

The fire burned, in difficult terrain, throughout 20–21 January without any serious impact. On 22 January, hot and dry conditions that had persisted for several days worsened. The fire spread rapidly in a southerly direction towards Dunkeld, south of Grampians National Park. The fire front reached the outskirts of Willaura (south-west of Ararat), before a strong but dry wind change took the fire back in the opposite direction. Winds of up to 120 kilometres per hour (75 mph) sent the fire northward extremely quickly, impacting a number of small communities along the eastern side of The Grampians, including Mafeking, Moyston, Barton, Jallukar and Pomonal. A man and his son died between Moyston and Pomonal when they were caught up in the fire. The fire was eventually controlled approximately two weeks later, having burned nearly 47% of the Grampians National Park, as well as a significant amount of private property, a total of 184,000 hectares (450,000 acres). Approximately 25 homes were destroyed, mostly to the west of Moyston and around Pomonal. Over 50 sheds and outbuildings, 1,500 kilometres (930 mi) of fencing, as well as 62,000 head of sheep and 500 head of cattle were lost to the blaze.

== See also ==
- 2005-06 Australian bushfire season
