= 1925–26 Victorian bushfire season =

Series of bushfires in Victoria, Australia

- Date: January – March 1926
- Location: Victoria, Australia

Impacts
- Deaths: 30
- Injuries: 700
- Structures lost: 1000

A series of major bushfires occurred between 26 January and 10 March 1926 in the state of Victoria in Australia. An accurate tally of those killed remains elusive. Initial assessments varied between 30 and 60, but the official figure given by the State government's relief fund later in November 1926 put the toll at 30.

Its reported that 700 people were injured, and 1000 buildings and 390,000 ha were destroyed across the south-east of the state.

On 14 February, later referred to as Black Sunday, bushfires swept across Gippsland, the Yarra Valley, the Dandenong Ranges and the Kinglake area. The fires had originated in State forest areas on 26 January, but wind gusts of up to 97 km per hour led to the joining of the fire fronts on 14 February. 30 deaths were recorded including 14 at Worlley’s Mill in Gilderoy, 6 at Big Pats Creek and 2 at Powelltown. Other affected settlements included Noojee, Erica and Kinglake, where St Mary's Church and Thompson's Hotel were amongst the buildings spared.
