= Bushfires in Australia =

Frequently occurring wildfire events

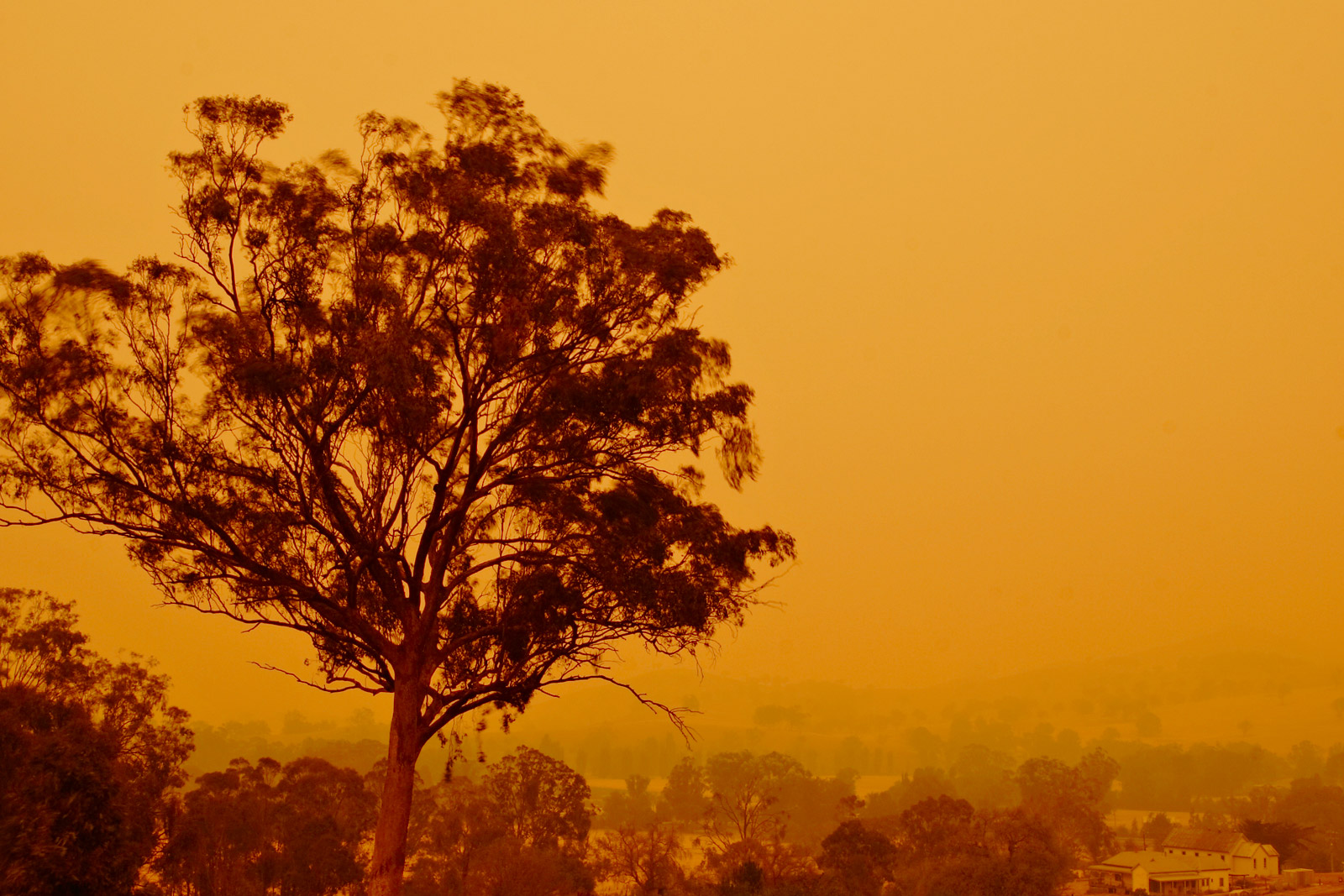
Looking towards the town Swifts Creek, Victoria, in December 2006 during the Victorian Alpine fires

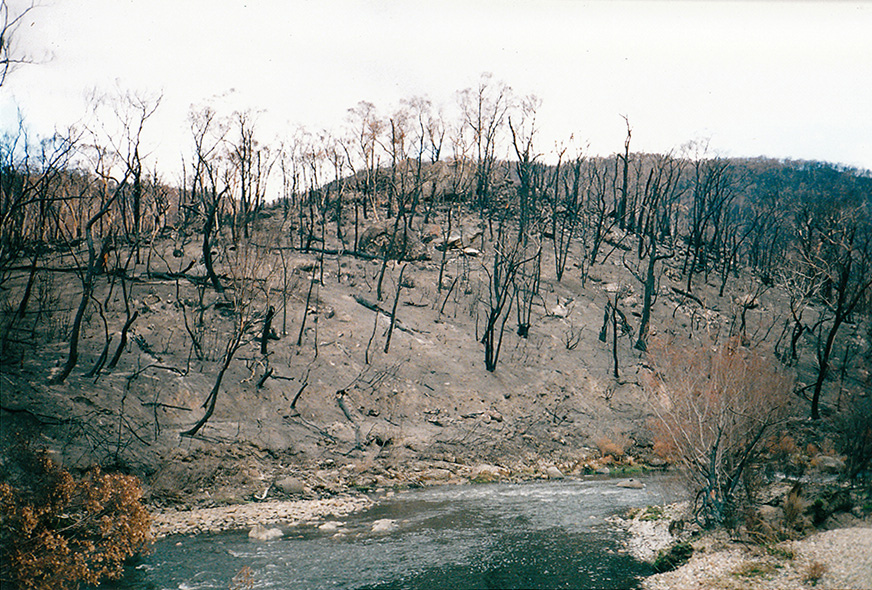
Intense bushfires can seriously impact the environment, such as here by the Big River, near Anglers Rest, East Gippsland, after the 2003 Victorian fires

Bushfires in Australia are a widespread and regular occurrence that have contributed significantly to shaping the nature of the continent over millions of years. In international terminology, an Australian bushfire is a type of wildfire, while "bushfire" remains the common Australian term for an unplanned landscape fire. Eastern Australia is one of the most fire-prone regions of the world, and its predominant eucalyptus forests have evolved to thrive on the phenomenon of bushfire. However, the fires can cause significant property damage and loss of both human and animal life. Bushfires have killed approximately 800 people in Australia since 1851, and billions of animals.

The most destructive fires are usually preceded by extreme high temperatures, low relative humidity and strong winds, which combine to create ideal conditions for the rapid spread of fire. Severe fire storms are often named according to the day on which they peaked, including the five most deadly blazes: Black Saturday 2009 in Victoria (173 people killed, 2,000 homes lost); Ash Wednesday 1983 in Victoria and South Australia (75 dead, nearly 1,900 homes); Black Friday 1939 in Victoria (71 dead, 650 houses destroyed), Black Tuesday 1967 in Tasmania (62 people and almost 1,300 homes); and the Gippsland fires and Black Sunday of 1926 in Victoria (60 people killed over a two-month period). Other major conflagrations include the 1851 Black Thursday bushfires, the 2006 December bushfires, the 1974–75 fires that burnt 15% of Australia, and the 2019–20 bushfires. It is estimated that the 2019–2020 bushfires led to the deaths of at least 33 people and over 3 billion animals.

The gradual drying of the Australian continent over the last 6,000 years has produced an ecology and environment prone to fire, which has resulted in many specialised adaptations amongst flora and fauna. Some of the country's flora has evolved to rely on bushfires for reproduction. Aboriginal Australians used to use fire to clear grasslands for hunting and to clear tracks through dense vegetation, and European settlers have also had to adapt to using fire to enhance agriculture and forest management since the 19th century.

== History ==
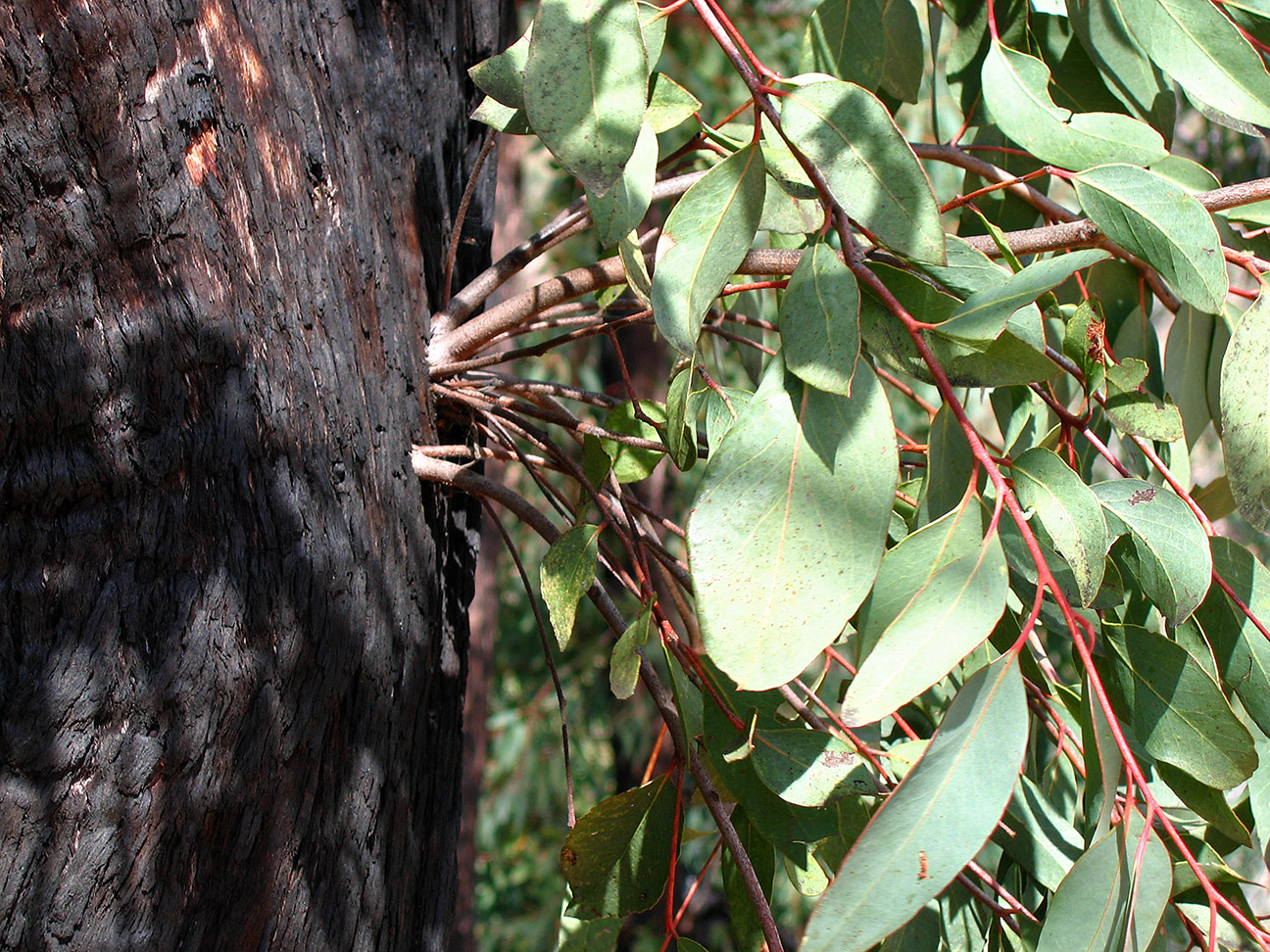
Epicormic shoots sprouting vigorously from epicormic buds beneath the thick bushfire damaged bark of a Eucalyptus tree – one of the mechanisms evolved by plants to survive bushfires

=== Before European settlement ===
According to Tim Flannery (The Future Eaters), fire is one of the most important forces at work in the Australian environment. Some plants have evolved a variety of mechanisms to survive or even require bushfires (possessing epicormic shoots or lignotubers that sprout after a fire, or developing fire-resistant or fire-triggered seeds), or even encourage fire (eucalypts contain flammable oils in its leaves) as a way to eliminate competition from less fire-tolerant species. Early European explorers of the Australian coastline noted extensive bushfire smoke. Abel Janszoon Tasman's expedition saw smoke drifting over the coast of Tasmania in 1642 and noted blackened trunks and baked earth in the forests. While charting the east coast in 1770, Captain Cook's crew saw autumn fires in the bush burning on most days of the voyage.

The fires would have been caused by both natural phenomenon and human hands. Aboriginal people in many regions set fire to grasslands in the hope of producing lusher grass to fatten kangaroos and other game and, at certain times of year, burned fire breaks as a precaution against bushfire. Fire-stick farming was also used to facilitate hunting and to promote the growth of bush potatoes and other edible ground-level plants. In central Australia, they used fire in this way to manage their country for thousands of years.

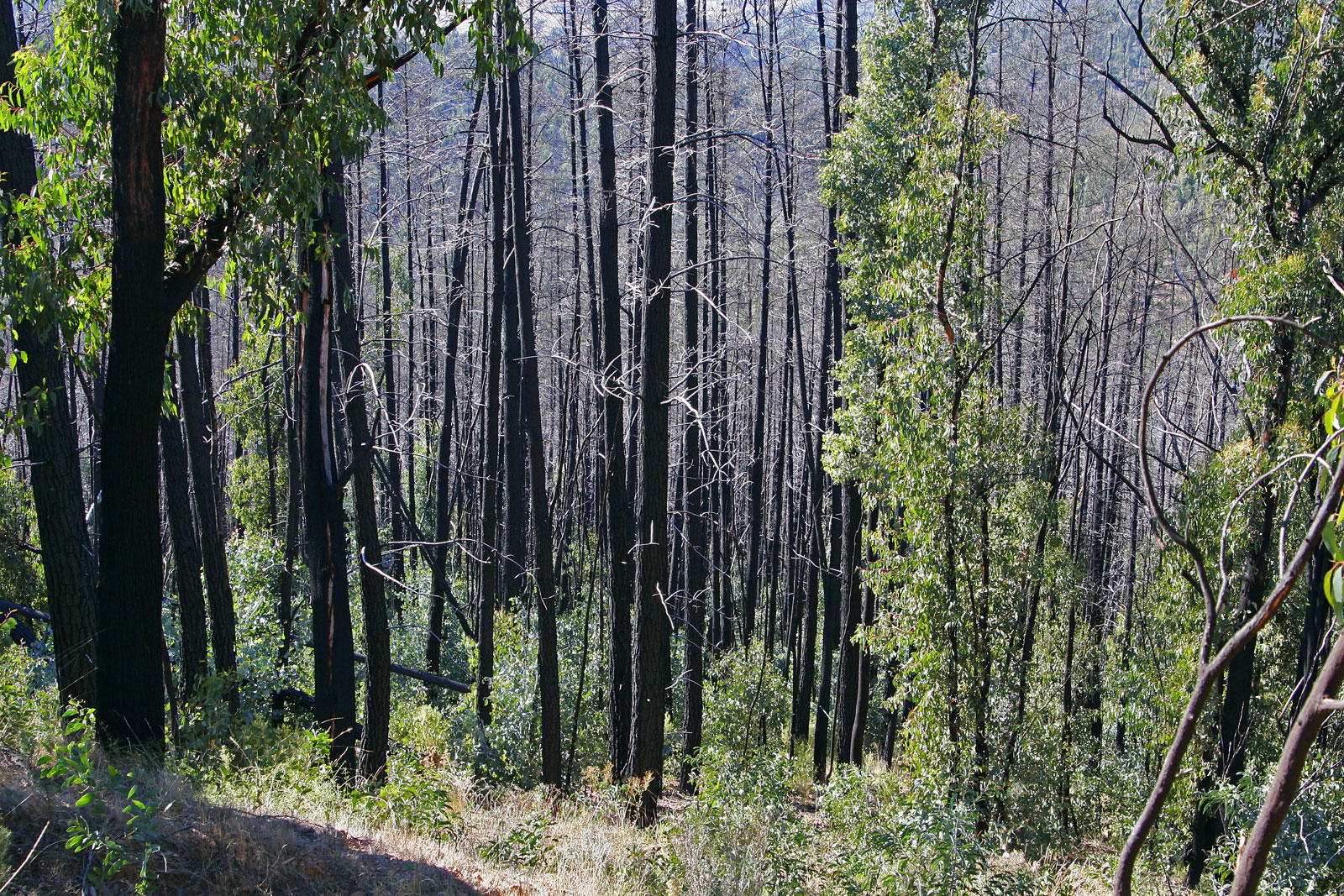
Bushfire damage to forests in East Gippsland, Victoria from the 2003 Eastern Victorian alpine bushfires, two years after fires swept through the area, showing the recovery of trees and undergrowth

Flannery writes that "The use of fire by Aboriginal people was so widespread and constant that virtually every early explorer in Australia makes mention of it. It was Aboriginal fire that prompted James Cook to call Australia 'This continent of smoke'." However, he goes on to say: "When control was wrested from the Aborigines and placed in the hands of Europeans, disaster resulted." Fire suppression became the dominant paradigm in fire management leading to a significant shift away from traditional burning practices. A 2001 study found that the disruption of traditional burning practices and the introduction of unrestrained logging meant that many areas of Australia were now prone to extensive wildfires especially in the dry season. A similar study in 2017 found that the removal of mature trees by Europeans since they began to settle in Australia may have triggered extensive shrub regeneration which presents a much greater fire fuel hazard. Another factor was the introduction of gamba grass imported into Queensland as a pasture grass in 1942, and planted on a large scale from 1983. This can fuel intense bushfires, leading to loss of tree cover and long-term environmental damage.

=== 19th century ===
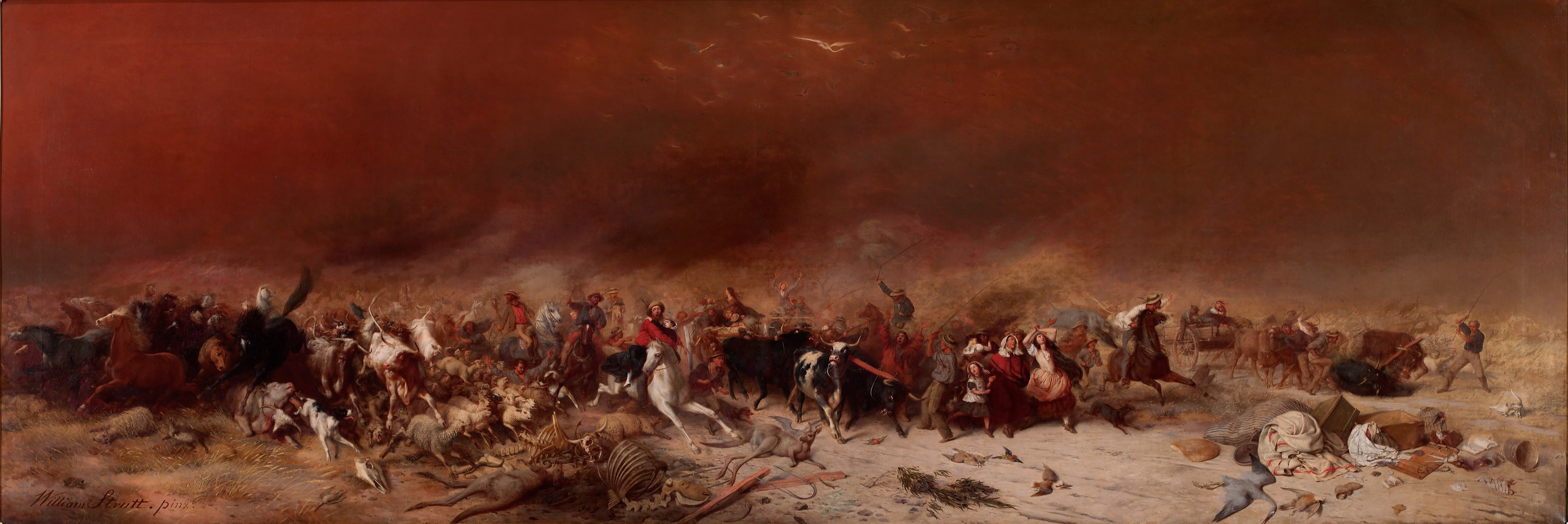
A depiction of the 1851 Black Thursday bushfires in Victoria

Australia's hot, arid climate and wind-driven bushfires were a new and frightening phenomenon to the European settlers of the colonial era. The devastating Victorian bushfires of 1851, remembered as the Black Thursday bushfires, burned in a chain from Portland to Gippsland, and sent smoke billowing across the Bass Strait to north west Tasmania, where terrified settlers huddled around candles in their huts under a blackened afternoon sky. The fires covered five million hectares, around one quarter of what is now the state of Victoria. Portland, Plenty Ranges, Westernport, the Wimmera and Dandenong districts were badly hit, and around twelve lives were recorded lost, along with one million sheep and thousands of cattle.

New arrivals from the wetter climes of Britain and Ireland learned painful lessons in fire management and the European farmers slowly began to adapt – growing green crops around their haystacks and burning fire breaks around their pastures, and becoming cautious about burn offs of wheatfield stubble and ringbarked trees. But major fire events persisted, including South Gippsland's 1898 Red Tuesday bushfires that burned 260,000 hectares (640,000 acres) and claimed twelve lives and more than 2,000 buildings.

A map of 19th century Australian bushfires shows over 7,000 bushfires reported in contemporary Australian newspapers.

=== 20th century ===
Large bushfires continued throughout the 20th century. With increasing population and urban spread into bushland came increasing death tolls and property damage during large fires.

==== 1925–26: Gippsland fires and Black Sunday ====
During the 1925–26 Victorian bushfire season, large areas of Gippsland in Victoria caught fire, leading to the Black Sunday fires on 14 February, when 31 people were killed in Warburton, near Melbourne. These fires remain the fifth most deadly bushfires recorded, with 60 people killed over two months.

==== 1938–39 season and Black Friday ====
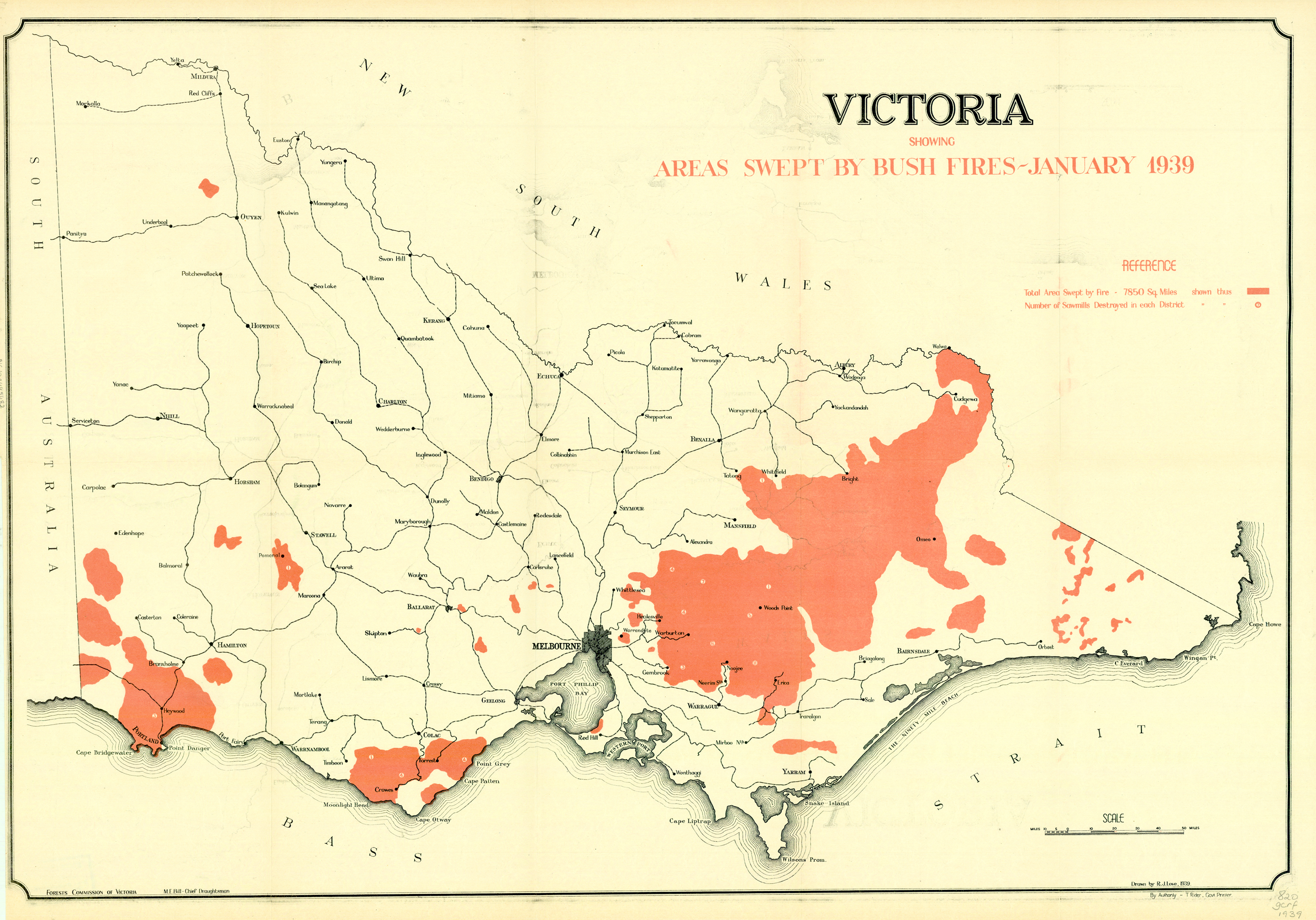
Extent of the 1939 Black Friday bushfires in Victoria

The 1939 fire season was one of the worst on record for Australia, peaking with Victoria's devastating Black Friday bushfires of 13 January, but enduring for the full summer, with fires burning the urban fringes of Sydney, Melbourne and Canberra, and ash falling as far away as New Zealand. The Black Friday fires were the third deadliest on record, with some 71 people killed and 650 houses destroyed. They followed years of drought and a series of extreme heatwaves that were accompanied by strong northerly winds, after a very dry six months. Melbourne hit 45.6 °C (114.1 °F) and Adelaide 46.1 °C (115.0 °F). In NSW, Bourke suffered 37 consecutive days above 38 degrees and Menindee hit a record 49.7 °C (121.5 °F) on 10 January.

New South Wales also lost hundreds of houses, thousands of stock and poultry, and thousands of hectares of grazing land. By 16 January, disastrous fires were burning in Victoria, New South Wales and the ACT at the climax of a terrible heatwave. Sydney was ringed to the north, south and west by fires from Palm Beach and Port Hacking to the Blue Mountains. Fires blazing at Castle Hill, Sylvania, Cronulla and French's Forest in the city. Disastrous fires were also reported at Penrose, Wollongong, Nowra, Bathurst, Ulludulla, Mittagong, Trunkey and Nelligen. Meanwhile, Canberra faced the "worst bushfires" it had experienced, with thousands of hectares burned and a 72-kilometre (45 mi) fire front driven towards the city by a south westerly gale, destroying pine plantations and many homesteads, and threatening Mount Stromlo Observatory, Government House, and Black Mountain. Large numbers of men were sent to stand by government buildings in the line of fire.

Black Friday

The state of Victoria was hardest hit, with an area of almost two million 2 million hectares (4.9 million acres; 20,000 square kilometres; 7,700 square miles) burned, 71 people killed, and whole townships wiped out, along with many sawmills and thousands of sheep, cattle and horses around Black Friday. Fires had been burning through December, but linked up with devastating force on Friday 13 January, plunging many areas of the state into midday blackness. The Stretton Royal Commission later wrote:

On [13 January] it appeared that the whole State was alight. At midday, in many places, it was dark as night. Men carrying hurricane lamps, worked to make safe their families and belongings. Travellers on the highways were trapped by fires or blazing fallen trees, and perished. Throughout the land, there was daytime darkness... Steel girders and machinery were twisted by heat as if they had been of fine wire. Sleepers of heavy durable timber, set in the soil, their upper surfaces flush with the ground, were burnt through... Where the fire was most intense the soil was burnt to such a depth that it may be many years before it shall have been restored...

— Stretton Royal Commission.

The townships of Warrandyte, Yarra Glen, Omeo and Pomonal were badly damaged, and fires burned to the urban fringe of Melbourne, affecting towns including Toolangi, Warburton and Thomson Valley. In the Victorian Alps, the towns of Bright, Cudgewa and Corryong were also hit, along with vast areas in the west, in particular Portland, the Otway Ranges and the Grampians. Black Range, Rubicon, Acheron, Noojee, Tanjil Bren, Hill End, Woods Point, Matlock, Erica, Omeo, Toombullup and the Black Forest were also affected. Huge amounts of smoke and ash were generated, with reports of ash falling as far away as New Zealand.

Legacy

After the bushfires, Victoria convened a royal commission. Judge Leonard Stretton was instructed to enquire into the causes of the fires, and consider the measures taken to prevent the fires and to protect life and property. He made seven major recommendations to improve forest and fire management, and planned burning became an official fire management practice.

==== 1966–67 and Black Tuesday ====
In the summer of 1967, Tasmania suffered its most destructive fire season, and Australia's fourth most deadly on record. A verdant spring had added higher than usual fuel to the state's forest floors, and strong northerly winds and high temperatures drove at least 80 different fires across the south-east, burning to within 2 kilometres (1.2 mi) of the centre of Hobart, the state capital. The infernos killed 62 people and destroyed almost 1,300 homes.

==== 1974–75 bushfire ====
In the summer of 1974–1975 (southern hemisphere), Australia suffered its worst recorded bushfire, when 15% of Australia's land mass suffered "extensive fire damage". Fires that summer burnt an estimated 117 million hectares (290 million acres; 1,170,000 square kilometres; 450,000 square miles).

The fires killed six people, approximately 57,000 farm animals, farmers' crops, and destroyed nearly 10,200 kilometres (6,300 mi) of fencing.

==== 1993–94 Sydney and NSW eastern seaboard bushfires ====
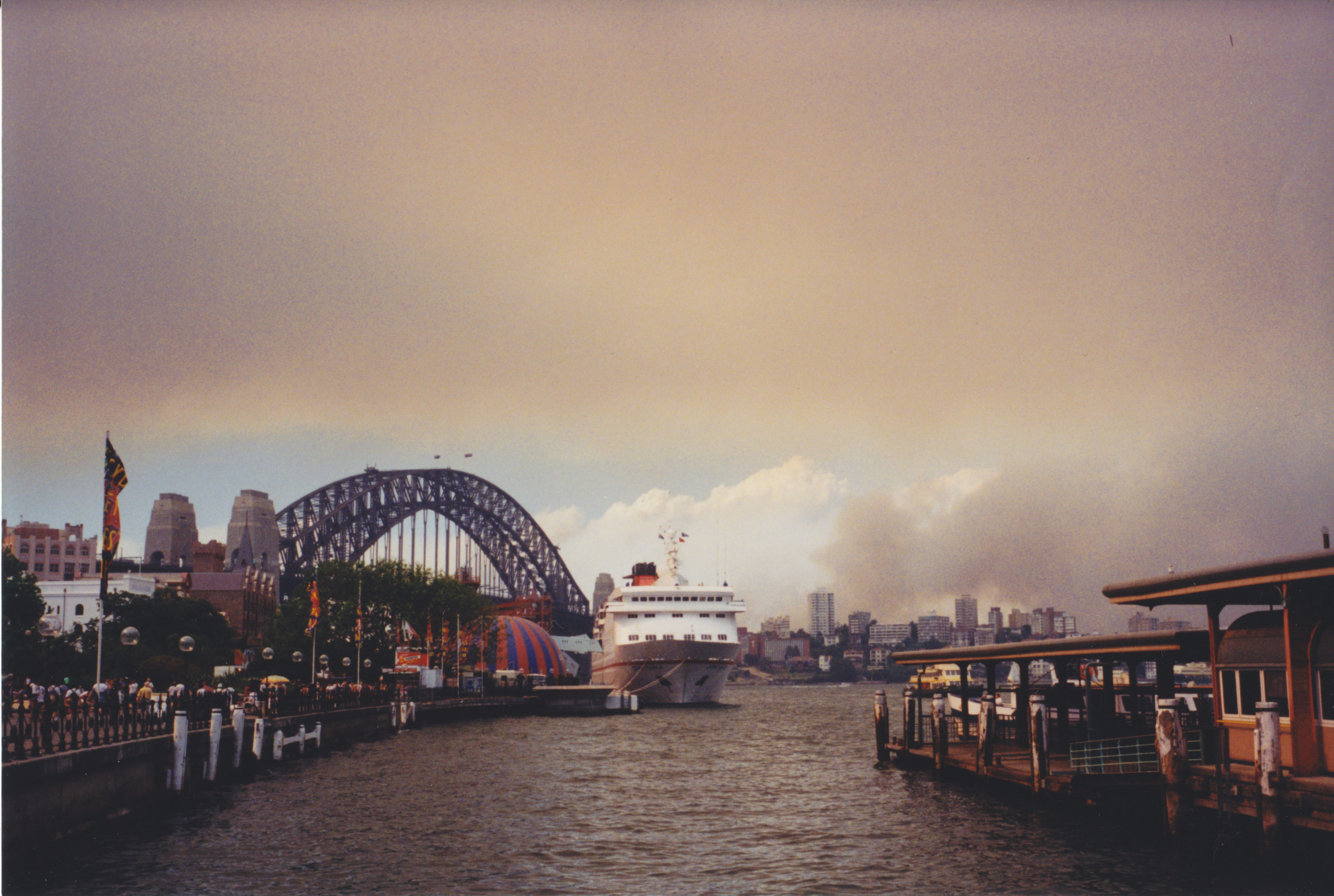
A pall of bushfire smoke over Sydney during the 1994 Eastern seaboard fires.

From 27 December 1993 to 16 January 1994, over 800 severe fires burned along the coastal areas of New South Wales, affecting the state's most populous regions. Blazes emerged from the Queensland border down the north and central coast, through the Sydney basin and down the south coast to Batemans Bay. The 800,000 hectares (2.0 million acres; 8,000 square kilometres; 3,100 square miles) spread of fires were generally contained within less than 100 kilometres (62 mi) from the coast, and many burned through rugged and largely uninhabited country in national parks or nature reserves. Dramatic scenes of the city of Sydney shrouded in thick bushfire smoke, and bushland suburbs on fire were broadcast around the world.

On 29 December, the Department of Bushfire Services was monitoring more than a dozen fires around the state, and homes were threatened in Turramurra by a fire in the Lane Cove River reserve, and a scrub fire had briefly cut off the holiday village of Bundeena in the Royal National Park, south of Sydney. The Age reported on 7 January that one-quarter of NSW was under threat in the worst fires seen in the state for nearly fifty years, as hundreds of firefighters from interstate joined 4,000 NSW firefighters battling blazes from Batemans Bay to Grafton. Fires in the Lane Cove River area at Marsfield, Turramurra, West Pymble and Macquarie Park were threatening hundreds of homes, and the fire in the Royal National Park raged toward Bundeena, where rescue boats evacuated 3,100 people caught in the path of the fire. With the Prime Minister Paul Keating on leave, Deputy Prime Minister Brian Howe, ordered 100 soldiers to join firefighting efforts and placed a further 100 on standby.

On 8 January, the Royal National Park fire swept into the southern Sydney suburbs of Como and Jannali where many homes would be destroyed, along with two schools a church and a kindergarten. The Como/Jannali fire burnt 476 hectares (1,180 acres) and destroyed 101 houses – more than half of the total homes lost in New South Wales during the January emergency period. Also on 8 January, fires had reached to within 1.5 kilometres (0.93 mi) of Gosford city centre, and some 5,000 people had been evacuated over that weekend with homes destroyed at Somersby and Peats Ridge.

By 9 January, more than 16,000 people were on standby for evacuation from the Lower Blue Mountains. Thousands of people were sleeping on the football field at the Central Coast Leagues Club, after the evacuation of Kariong, Woy Woy, Umina, Ettalong and Brisbane Waters. Much of Gosford, Kariong and Somersby had been evacuated, along with Terry Hill. Homes at Menai, Sutherland, Chatswood, Lindfield, Turramurra, Macquarie Park and Sydney's northern beaches had been lost. 60 fires were burning on the north coast, as firefighters battled infernos over 30 hectares (74 acres) from Coffs Harbour to the Queensland border. Fires were approaching towns in the Blue Mountains including Blackheath and in the Shoalhaven, including Ulladulla.

Legacy

Some 20,000 firefighters were deployed against around 800 fires mainly along the coast and ranges. The fires caused mass evacuations, claimed four lives, destroyed some 225 homes and burnt 800,000 hectares (2.0 million acres; 8,000 square kilometres; 3,100 square miles) of bushland. They were met with amongst the largest firefighting efforts in Australian history. A lengthy Coronial inquest followed the fires, leading to the formation of the New South Wales Rural Fire Service. The Rural Fires Act 1997 was proclaimed on 1 September 1997.

=== 21st century ===
==== 2003 Canberra bushfires ====
During 18–22 January 2003, almost 70% of the Australian Capital Territory's (ACT) pastures, pine plantations, and nature parks were severely damaged, and most of the Mount Stromlo Observatory was destroyed. Fires entered the suburbs of Canberra on 18 January 2003 and, in the following ten hours, four people died and over 490 were injured 470 homes were destroyed or severely damaged.

==== 2008–2009 and Black Saturday ====
Extreme bushfire conditions—Melbourne's maximum temperature was above 43.0 °C (109.4 °F) for three consecutive days for the first time since records had been kept, accompanied by strong winds on 7 February 2009, later to be known as 'Black Saturday'—precipitated major bushfires throughout Victoria, involving several large fire complexes, which continued to burn across the state for around one month. 173 people died in these fires and 414 were injured. 3,500+ buildings were destroyed, including 2,029 houses, and 7,562 people displaced. In terms of loss of life and property damage, the Black Saturday fires rank as the most devastating in Australian history. The 2009 Victorian Bushfires Royal Commission was called to investigate the Victorian government's strategy regarding bushfires. The fires are widely considered the worst in Australian history.

==== 2019–2020 ====
From September 2019 until March 2020, when the final fire was extinguished, Australia had one of the worst bushfire seasons in its recorded history. 2019 had been the hottest record year for Australia, with the bushfire season starting in June 2019. This caused massive damage throughout the country, with fires in each state and territory. The east coast experienced widespread destruction from mega-blazes, such as the Currowan bushfire, which was just one of many catastrophic bushfires during the 2019–2020 season. In terms of the area of land burnt, wildlife deaths, and damage to the environment, some of its permanent damage, such as the burning of rainforest.

== Factors and causes ==
=== Human-caused ===
Although there is no consensus, a significant proportion of bushfires in Australia are thought to be directly caused by humans. As an example, of the fires with a known cause in south-eastern Australia between 1997 and 2009, 47% were due to accidental causes, due to such things as cigarettes, escaped burn-offs and campfires, or sparks from equipment or powerlines, 40% were deliberately lit and 13% were caused by lightning; the cause of the rest was undetermined. Population density was the main driver of total ignitions at the bioregion level.

=== Weather ===
In recent times most major bush fires have been started in remote areas by dry lightning. Some reports indicate that a changing climate could also be contributing to the ferocity of the 2019–20 fires with hotter, drier conditions making the country's fire season longer and much more dangerous. During periods of drought, the fuel for wildfires is greater than normal, and bushfires combine to become megafires, generating their own weather and spreading fire further.

Strong winds also promote the rapid spread of fires by lifting burning embers into the air. This is known as spotting and can start a new fire up to 40 kilometres (25 mi) downwind from the fire front.

In New South Wales, dry Föhn-like winds originating from the Great Dividing Range abruptly raise air temperatures in the lee of that mountain range and reduce atmospheric moisture, thus elevating fire danger. This occurs because of the partial orographic obstruction of comparatively damp low-level air and the sinking of drier upper-level air in leeward of the mountains, which is heated because of the adiabatic compression.

=== Natural phenomena ===
Large, violent wildfires can generate winds of themselves, called fire whirls. Fire whirls are like tornadoes and result from the vortices created by the fire's heat. When these vortices are tilted from horizontal to vertical, this creates fire whirls. These whirls have been known to hurl flaming logs and burning debris over considerable distances.

In the Northern Territory, fires can also be spread by black kites, whistling kites and brown falcons. These birds have been spotted picking up burning twigs, flying to areas of unburned grass and dropping them to start new fires there. This exposes their prey attempting to flee the blazes: small mammals, birds, lizards, and insects.

=== Topography ===
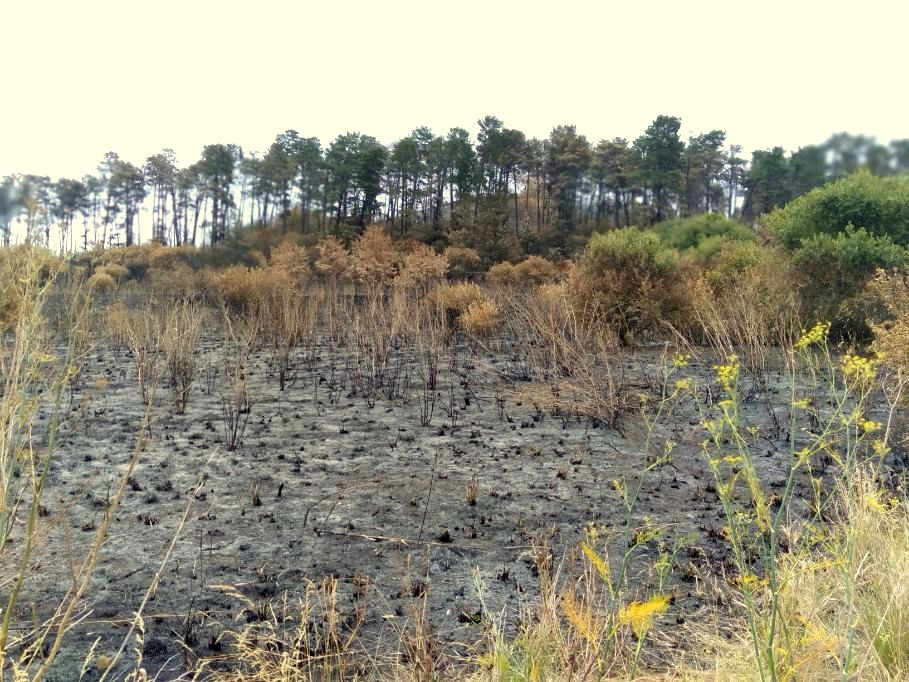
A hilly bushfire that charred Prospect Hill, in Sydney.

The topography, or shape of the land, has a strong affect on bushfire behaviour. The steepness of a slope and the direction of the fire front will influence how fast the bushfire spreads. For example, fire spreads much quicker up-slope than down-slope. Terrain can also affect local weather conditions, such as how hot and windy it is. In addition, the aspect of terrain (the compass direction that a slope faces) will influence the amount of sunlight (solar radiation) that a fuel receives. This can influence the moisture content of the fuel and potentially hinder or enhance a bushfire.

=== Climate change ===
Australia's climate has warmed by more than one degree Celsius over the past century, causing an increase in the frequency and intensity of heatwaves and droughts. Eight of Australia's ten warmest years on record have occurred since 2005. A study in 2018 conducted at Melbourne University found that the major droughts of the late 20th century and early 21st century in southern Australia are "likely without precedent over the past 400 years". Across the country, the average summer temperatures have increased leading to record-breaking hot weather, with the early summer of 2019 the hottest on record. 2019 was also Australia's driest ever year since 1900 with rainfall 40% lower than average.

Heatwaves and droughts dry out the undergrowth and create conditions that increase the risk of bushfires. This has become worse in the last 30 years. Since the mid-1990s, southeast Australia has experienced a 15% decline in late autumn and early winter rainfall and a 25% decline in average rainfall in April and May. Rainfall for January to August 2019 was the lowest on record in the Southern Downs (Queensland) and Northern Tablelands (New South Wales) with some areas 77% below the long term average.

In the 2000s, the Intergovernmental Panel on Climate Change (IPCC) concluded that ongoing anthropogenic climate change was virtually certain to increase in intensity and frequency of fires in Australia – a conclusion that has been endorsed in numerous reports since. In November 2019, the Australian Climate Council published a report titled This is Not Normal which also found the catastrophic bushfire conditions affecting NSW and Queensland in late 2019 have been aggravated by climate change. According to Nerilie Abram writing in Scientific American "the link between the current extremes and anthropogenic climate change is scientifically indisputable". In 2020, an international team of scientists found the hot and dry conditions that helped drive Australia's 2019–2020 bushfire crisis would be eight times more likely to happen if the earth warms by 2.0 °C (3.6 °F).

The bushfires have not only been made more likely and intense by climate change, but they also add to it. Until the 2019–2020 Australian bushfire season, the forests in Australia were thought to reabsorb all the carbon released in bushfires across the country. This would mean the forests achieved net-zero emissions. However, global warming is making bushfires burn more intensely and frequently and the 2019–2020 bushfires have already emitted 400 megatonnes of carbon dioxide into the atmosphere, according to the Copernicus monitoring programme. This is as much as Australia's average annual carbon dioxide emissions in just the past three months. These will increase Australia's annual greenhouse gas emissions, contributing to global warming, and heighten the likelihood of recurring megafires that will release yet more emissions.

=== Carbon emissions ===
Until the 2019–2020 Australian bushfire season, the forests in Australia were thought to reabsorb all the carbon released in bushfires across the country. This would mean the forests achieved net-zero emissions. However, scientists now say that global warming is making bushfires burn more intensely and frequently and believe the 2019–2020 fires have already released approximately 350 million tonnes (390 million short tons) of carbon dioxide – as much as two-thirds of Australia's average annual carbon dioxide emissions (530 million tonnes (580 million short tons) in 2017) between October and December 2019. David Bowman, professor of pyrogeography and fire science at the University of Tasmania warned that so much damage has been done that Australian forests may take more than 100 years to re-absorb the carbon that has been released so far this fire season.

In January 2020, the British Met Office said Australia's bushfires in 2019–2020 were expected to contribute 2% to the increase in the atmospheric concentration of major greenhouse gases which are forecast to hit 417 parts per million, one of the largest annual increases in atmospheric carbon dioxide on record. Climate studies show that conditions which promote extreme bushfires in Australia will only get worse as more greenhouse gases are added to the atmosphere.

Southeast Australia experienced intensive and geographically extensive wildfires during the 2019–2020 summer season. The fires released substantial amounts of carbon dioxide into the atmosphere. However, existing emission estimates based on fire inventories are uncertain and vary by up to a factor of four for this event. Emission estimates are constrained with the help of satellite observations of carbon monoxide, an analytical Bayesian inversion and observed ratios between emitted carbon dioxide and carbon monoxide. It is estimated emissions of carbon dioxide to be 715 teragrams (range 517–867) from November 2019 to January 2020. This is more than twice the estimate derived by five different fire inventories and broadly consistent with estimates based on a bottom-up bootstrap analysis of this fire episode. Although fires occur regularly in the savannas in northern Australia, the recent episodes were extremely large in scale and intensity, burning unusually large areas of eucalyptus forest in the southeast. The fires were driven partly by climate change, making better-constrained emission estimates particularly important. This is because the build-up of atmospheric carbon dioxide may become increasingly dependent on fire-driven climate-carbon feedbacks, as highlighted by this event.

=== Seasonality ===
Bushfires in Australia can occur all year-round, though the severity and the "bushfire season" varies by region.

There is no formal definition for a single bushfire season across the whole of Australia. There is no one terminology used for periods of fire activity. The technical terms used for periods of fire risk and fire activity include fire weather season, fire danger season, bush fire danger period, fire danger period, fire permit period, restricted burning times, and, prohibited burning times, and fire season.

The term "Australian bushfire season", is a colloquialism broadly defined by common usage, from when the first uncontrolled fires start any time from June onwards, typically shortened to "bushfire season", and applies mainly to southern and eastern Australia. It can continue through to April. Central and northern Australia have two separately defined fire seasons. The colloquial term is typically used in conjunction with the technical terms when conveying information to the public.

The Australian Bureau of Meteorology defines five "fire danger seasons", being times of peak bushfire activity, roughly corresponding to broad bands of latitude across the Australian continent including winter and spring, across the most northern parts of Australia; spring; spring and summer; summer; and summer and autumn, across the most southern parts of Australia.

Each Australian state and territory jurisdiction defines periods of peak fire risk or fire activity differently. New South Wales has a default statutory "bush fire danger period" defined in law, from 1 October to 31 March. The state government can then declare different start and end dates for bush fire danger periods for each local government area within the state. In 2019 these started 1 August. Victoria declares a "fire danger period" for each local government area. Victorian fire danger periods typically start in October and finish as late as May. The South Australia Government declares a "fire danger season" for each local government area, potentially starting in October and finishing at the end of April. The Tasmanian Government declares fire permit periods for local government areas. In 2019 this commenced 31 October. Western Australia requires each local government area to declare its own "restricted burning times" roughly aligned with spring and autumn, and "prohibited burning times" roughly aligned with summer. The Northern Territory defines two broad "fire seasons", a northern fire season, which can run from April to November, and a central Australian fire season, which can run from October to March. The Government also refers to these as "fire danger periods".

Bushfire seasons are commonly grouped into years such as "2019–2020 Australian bushfire season" and typically apply to the season for southern and eastern Australia; from 1 June to 31 May annually.

=== Lack of preventative measures ===
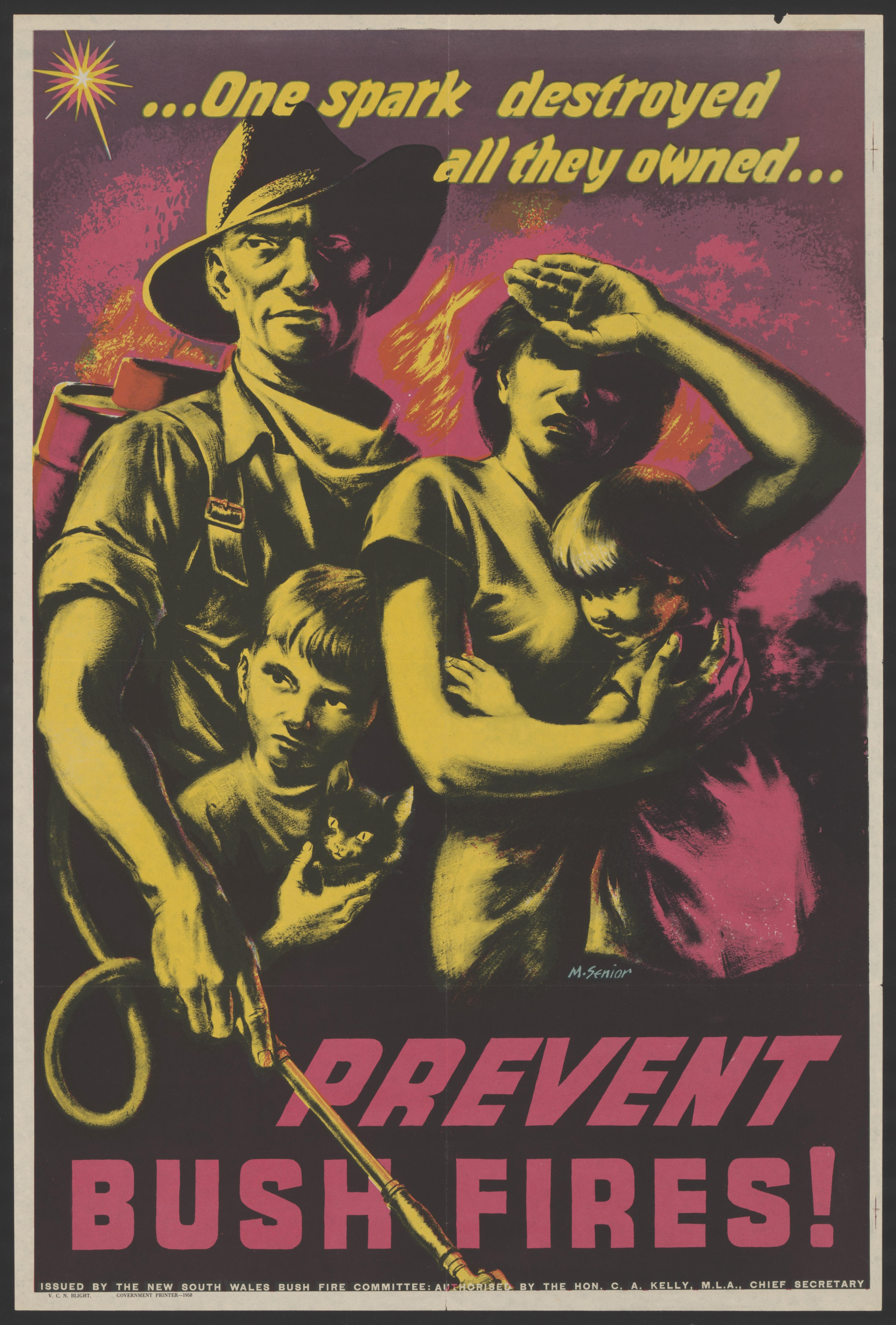
Poster from a 1958 campaign by the New South Wales Bush Fire Committee

In the last ten years or so, government licenses have been granted to fire-prevention programs on Aboriginal lands in northern Australia. In this area Aboriginal traditions, which reduce the undergrowth that can fuel bigger blazes, revolve around the monsoon. Land is burned patch by patch using "cool" fires in targeted areas during the early dry season, between March and July. These defensive burning programs began in the 1980s and 1990s when Aboriginal groups moved back onto their native lands. Since this process began, destructive bushfires in northern Australia have burned 57% fewer acres in 2019 than they did on average in the years from 2000 to 2010, the decade before the program started.

Oliver Costello from the national Indigenous Firesticks Alliance stated that in southern Australia, Aboriginal knowledge systems of fire management are less valued than in the north. In the Kimberley area, the land council applies local resources and holds community fire planning meetings to ensure the correct people are doing the burning. Burn lines are approved by the group but Indigenous rangers set the fires, backed up by modern technology involving constant weather readings and taking into account the conditions of the day. Costello pointed out that northern Australia has developed a collaborative infrastructure for 'cultural burning' and noted that: "There's no investment really outside of northern Australia Indigenous fire management of any significance."

== Impact on wildlife and fauna ==
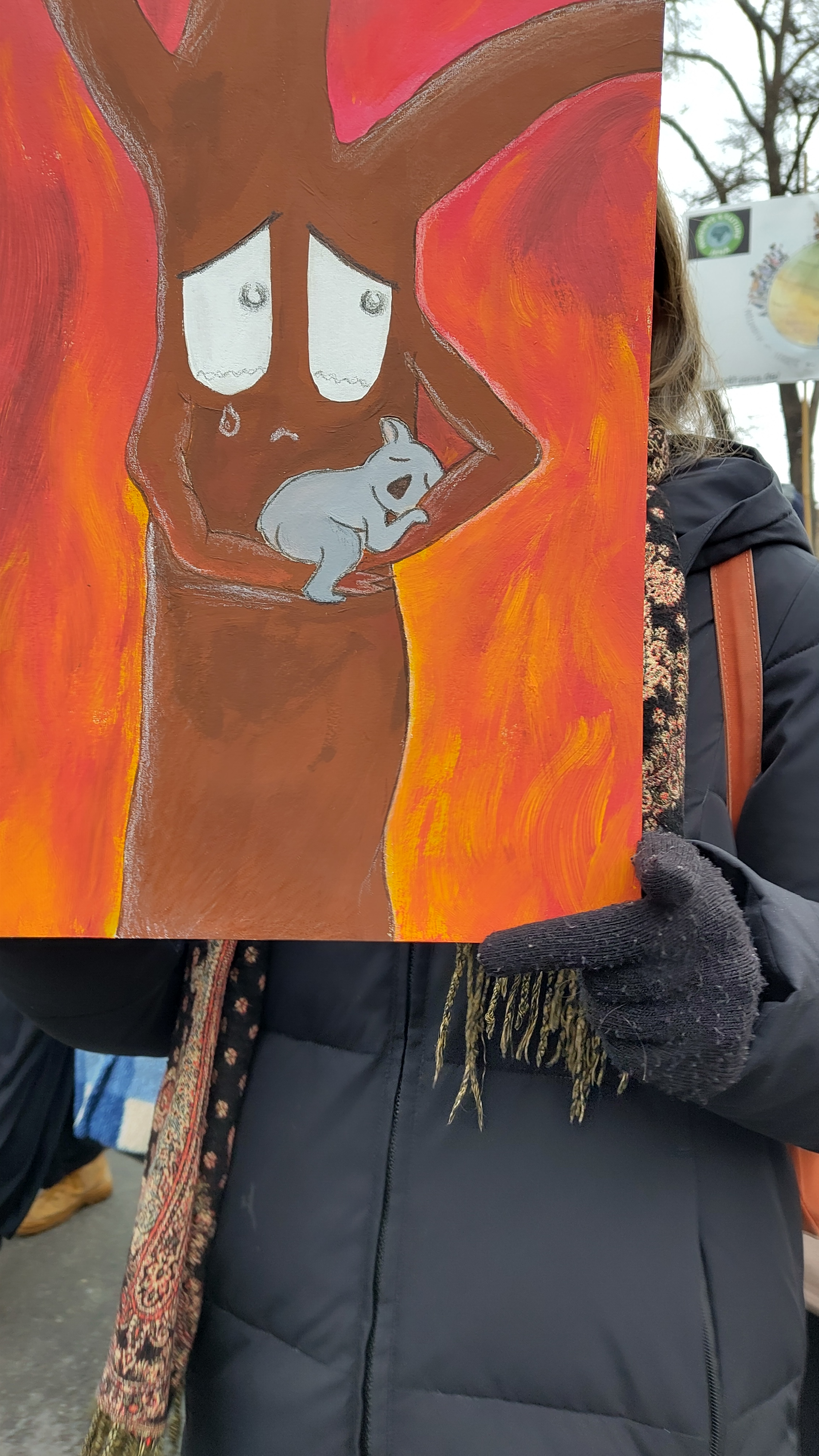
A koala on a tree during a bushfire as depicted on a sign at a climate strike in Jena, Germany.

Bush fires kill animals directly and also destroy local habitats, leaving the survivors vulnerable even once the fires have passed. Professor Chris Dickman at Sydney University estimates that in the first three months of the 2019–2020 bushfires, over 800 million animals died in NSW, and more than one billion nationally. This figure includes mammals, birds, and reptiles but does not include insects, bats or frogs. Many of these animals were burnt to death in the fires, with many others dying later due to the depletion of food and shelter resources and predation by feral cats and red foxes. Dickman adds that Australia has the highest rate of species loss of any area in the world, with fears that some of Australia's native species, like the Kangaroo Island dunnart, may even become extinct because of the current fires.

One study from the Australian government in 2020 and paints a stark picture: 272 plants and 55 animal threatened species in Australia had a significant portion of their known distribution within the fire footprint. A further 49 species had more than 80% of their modelled likely and known distribution range affected by the fires.

Koalas are perhaps the most vulnerable because they are slow-moving. In extreme fires, koalas tend to climb up to the top of a tree and curl into a ball where they become trapped. In January 2020 it was reported that half of the 50,000 koalas on Kangaroo Island off Australia's southern coast, which are kept separate to those on the mainland as insurance for the species' future, are thought to have died in the previous few weeks.

Wildlife ecologist Professor Euan Ritchie from Deakin University says that when fires have passed, frogs and skinks are left vulnerable when their habitats have been destroyed. Loss of habitat also affects already endangered species such as the western ground parrot, the Leadbeater's possum, the Mallee emu-wren (a bird which cannot fly very far), and Gilbert's potoroo. Beekeepers have also lost hives in bushfires.

Kangaroos and wallabies can move quickly trying to escape from fires. However, The Guardian reported in January 2020 that dozens, maybe hundreds of kangaroos "perished in their droves" as they tried to outrun the flames near Batlow in NSW. The most resilient animals are those that can burrow or fly. Possums often get singed, but can sometimes hide in tree hollows. Wombats and snakes tend to go underground.

Goannas can benefit from bushfires. Dickman says: "In central Australia, we've seen goannas coming out from their burrows after a fire and picking off injured animals – singed birds, young birds, small mammals, surface-dwelling lizards, and snakes."

Next to the impact on wildlife stands the impact on fauna and flora. 85% of the plants found in Australia are endemic. Likewise, various species of extinct varieties plants are only found in the forests of Australia. Many species are adapted to recover from bushfires by for example growing from seeds waiting dormant in nearby soils. But the 2019–20 Australian bushfire season occurred at a scale and intensity that is unprecedented according to wildlife ecologist Sarah Legge. During the 2019–2020 bushfires, 11 Australian bioregions, 17 major native vegetation groups were severely burnt. Also, up to 67%–83% of the globally significant rainforests and eucalypt forests and woodlands were severely burnt.

== Impact on humans ==
The most devastating impact on humans is that bushfires have killed over 800 people since 1851. In addition to loss of life, homes, properties, and livestock are destroyed potentially leaving people homeless, traumatised, and without access to electricity, telecommunications and, in some cases, to drinking water. Discussions regarding the number of individuals indirectly killed by the fires have stated that the number of fatalities is around 400.

=== Health ===
Bushfires produce particulate-matter pollution – airborne particles that are small enough to enter and damage human lung tissue. Following the Hazelwood fire in 2014, Fay Johnston, an associate professor of public health at the University of Tasmania's Menzies Institute for Medical Research, says young children exposed to smoke either as infants, toddlers or in the womb develop changes to their lung function. She says: "Unborn babies exposed to the Hazelwood smoke were more likely to experience coughs or colds two to four years after the fires." Other studies conducted in Australia show an increase in respiratory diseases among adults stemming from air pollution caused by bushfires.

As a result of intense smoke and air pollution stemming from the fires, in January 2020 Canberra measured the worst air quality index of any major city in the world. The orange-tinged smoke entered homes and offices buildings across the capital making breathing outside very difficult, forcing businesses and institutions to shut their doors. Studies show that residents of highly polluted cities also have an increased risk of heart attack, stroke, and diabetes. Professor Jalaluddin, a chief investigator with the Centre for Air Pollution, Energy and Health Policy Research, says: "There is increasing evidence around air pollution and (the development of) neurological conditions, for example, Parkinson's disease and Alzheimer's."

Prof David Bowman, director of the Fire Centre Research Hub at the University of Tasmania, referred to the 2019–2020 fires as "absolutely transformative and unprecedented" in scale and stated, "It's pretty much a third of the Australian population that has been impacted, with prolonged, episodic exposure and sometimes extreme health impacts." Since September 2019, close to 3,000 firefighters have been out every day in NSW battling blazes. The NSW RFS stated that close to 90% of those are unpaid volunteers. David McBride, associate professor of occupational and environmental medicine at the University of Otago stated, "They push themselves to the limit – they can suffer heat stress, which is a life-threatening injury, and end up with chronic bronchitis and asthma".

Research conducted at the University of Tasmania estimated that bushfire smoke emitted during the 2019–2020 fire season was responsible for 417 excess deaths. PM_{2.5} levels in parts of Sydney reached nearly 400 μg/m^{3}, a level described by the World Health Organisation as hazardous.

In Australia, studies show that most male infants with drastically higher average birth weights were born in severely fire-affected areas. This is attributed to the fact that maternal signals directly affect fetal growth patterns.

=== Psychological problems ===
Psychological problems following a major bushfire appear to develop when people have a chance to stop and reflect on their experience. A study of 1,526 people who experienced significant losses in the 1983 Ash Wednesday bushfires found that after 12 months, 42% met the criteria for a psychiatric problem which is double the prevalence in an unaffected community. After twenty months this figure had dropped to 23%.

A typical example of how people are affected is described by the 2016 fire at Yarloop in Western Australia. It virtually destroyed the town (population 395) including 180 homes, historic timber workshops, factories, an old church, the old hospital, shops, the hotel, the fire station and a part of the school. Two people died. Damage to infrastructure included the Samson Brook Bridge, Salmon River Bridge and power infrastructure supplying thousands of homes in the area. Two years later, people from Yarloop were still suffering from trauma distress from the fire. Apart from the economic losses suffered by those who lived there, the dislocation to their lives was so great that many in the community were doubtful that the town would be rebuilt. The WA Government subsequently spent A$64 million rebuilding the town and the surrounding communities.

=== Economic impact ===
Economic damage from 2009's Black Saturday fires, the costliest in Australia's history, reached an estimated A$4.4 billion. Moody's Analytics says the cost of the 2019–2020 bushfires is likely to exceed that figure and will cripple consumer confidence and harm industries such as farming and tourism. Medical bills from the current fires and smoke haze are expected to reach hundreds of millions of dollars with one analysis suggesting disruptions caused by the fire and smoke haze could cost Sydney as much as A$50 million a day. The Insurance Council of Australia estimates that claims for damage from the fires would be more than A$700 million, with claims expected to jump when more fire-hit areas become accessible. In January 2020, it was reported that the ANZ gauge of consumer confidence fell to its lowest level in more than four years.

In response to the current fires, the federal government announced that compensation would be paid to volunteer firefighters, military personnel would be deployed to assist, and an A$2 billion bush fire recovery fund would be established. New South Wales, which has been hardest hit by the crisis, has pledged A$1 billion focused on repairing infrastructure.

Economic activity has been adversely affected by these conditions for two years or more. Farm GDP has declined by 22 per cent since early 2017 and is expected to decline by a further 7 per cent over the remainder of 2019/20. This would take the decline in farm GDP since early 2017 to around 30 per cent – comparable to the decline observed during the 2002/03 and 2005/06 episodes of the Millennium drought. The direct effects of the recent bushfires are expected to reduce GDP growth across the December 2019 and March 2020 quarters by around 0.2 percentage points, with some recovery in the June quarter and beyond. However, there is uncertainty around this estimate.

== Official inquiries ==
After many major bushfires, state and federal governments have initiated inquiries to see what could be done to address the problem. A parliamentary report from 2010 stated that between 1939 and 2010, there have been at least 18 major bushfire inquiries including state and federal parliamentary committee inquiries, COAG reports, coronial inquiries and Royal Commissions. Another report published in 2015 stated there have been 51 inquiries into wildfires and wildfire management since 1939. The authors noted that Royal Commissions were not the most effective way to learn from past bushfire events. Many of the inquiries into bushfires have recommended "hazard reduction burning" intended to reduce the available fuel and have set targets to burn a certain percentage of forest each year to reduce risk. Planned burns are difficult to do safely and many of the investigations and Royal Commissions have found these targets are seldom met. At the same time, fire management experts disagree on how effective planned burning is.

In January 2020, during the 2019–2020 bushfire season, Prime Minister Scott Morrison raised the prospect of establishing another royal commission, stating in an interview on ABC-TV 7.30 that any inquiry into the crisis would need to be comprehensive and investigate climate change as well as other possible causes. Letters Patent were subsequently issued for the Royal Commission into National Natural Disaster Arrangements on 20 February 2020.

== Warnings ==
A manual controlled fire danger rating sign after the 2022 new system adoption.

During the fire season, the Bureau of Meteorology provides fire weather forecasts. Fire agencies determine the appropriate Fire Danger Rating by considering the predicted weather including temperature, relative humidity, wind speed and dryness of vegetation. These Fire Danger Ratings are a feature of weather forecasts and alert the community to the actions they should take in preparation for the day. Ratings are broadcast via newspapers, radio, TV, and the internet.

In 2009, a standardised "Fire Danger Rating" (FDR) was adopted by all Australian states. This included a whole new level – catastrophic fire danger. The first time this level of danger was forecast for Sydney was in November 2019 during the 2019–2020 bushfire season. In 2010, following a national review of the bush fire danger ratings, new trigger points for each rating were introduced for grassland areas in most jurisdictions.

The Australian Fire Danger Rating System was adopted nationally on 1 September 2022, replacing the previous McArthur Forest Fire Danger Index. Its purpose is to provide an efficient and easy to understand way to communicate fire danger broadly to the community. Broken into 4 levels, it indicates the necessary actions to take and danger levels.

Australian Fire Danger Rating System
Level	Fire Behaviour Index	Actions to Take
Catastrophic	100+	For your survival, leave bushfire risk areas
Extreme	50–99	Take action now to protect life and property
High	24–49	Be ready to act
Moderate	12–23	Plan and Prepare
No rating	0–12	

== Remote monitoring ==
Remote monitoring of wildfires is done in Australia. Geoscience Australia developed the (real-time) Sentinel bushfire monitoring system. It uses data from satellites to help fire-fighting agencies assess and manage risks. There is also MyFireWatch, which is a program based on an existing Department of Fire and Emergency Services program, redeveloped by Landgate and Edith Cowan University for use by the general public. Besides the use of satellites, Australian firefighters also make use of UAV's as a tool for combating fire. Technologist Angus Dorney has observed that "[Australia's] fire services have developed in a largely tech-free environment" and it will be necessary to support cultural change alongside technological solutions if promising technological advances are to live up to their potential.

== Regional management ==
The National Council for Fire & Emergency Services is the peak body responsible for representing fire, emergency services, and land management agencies in the Australasian region.

=== Queensland ===
The Rural Fire Service (RFS) is a volunteer-based firefighting agency and operates as part of the Queensland Fire Department. The Queensland Fire Department are the professional firefighters that fight these fires across Queensland in the cities and the bush.

=== New South Wales ===
Fire and Rescue NSW (FRNSW), the Forestry Corporation of NSW (FCNSW), the National Parks and Wildlife Service (NPWS) and the New South Wales Rural Fire Service (RFS) work together to manage and respond to fires across New South Wales.

=== South Australia ===
The Country Fire Service is a volunteer-based fire service in the state of South Australia. The CFS operates as a part of the South Australian Fire and Emergency Services Commission (SAFECOM).

=== Victoria ===
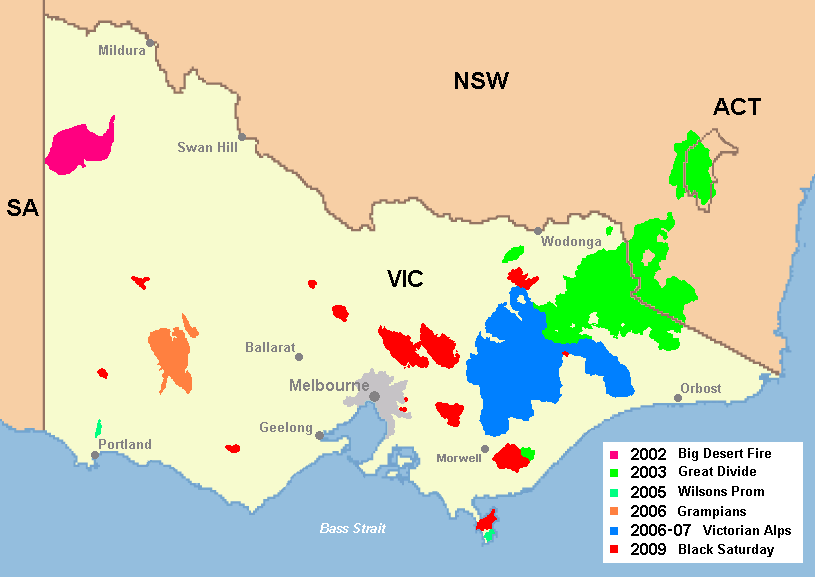
Major bushfires in Victoria in the 2000s

In Victoria, the Country Fire Authority (CFA) provides firefighting and other emergency services to country areas and regional townships within the state, as well as large portions of the outer suburban areas and growth corridors of Melbourne not covered by the Metropolitan Fire Brigade.

Responsibility for fire suppression and management, including planned burning on public land such as State Forests and National Parks, which makes up about 7.1 million hectares (18 million acres; 71,000 square kilometres; 27,000 square miles) or about one-third of the State, sits with the Department of Environment, Land, Water, and Planning (DELWP).

=== Western Australia ===
The Department of Fire and Emergency Services (DFES) and the Department of Parks and Wildlife (P&W) have joint responsibility for bushfire management in Western Australia. DFES is an umbrella organisation supporting the Fire and Rescue Service (FRS), Bush Fire Service (BFS), Volunteer Fire and Rescue Service (VFRS), State Emergency Service (SES), Volunteer Fire and Emergency Service (VFES), Emergency Services Cadets and the Volunteer Marine Rescue Service (VMR).

=== Tasmania ===
The Tasmania Fire Service manages bushfires in Tasmania with the help of Tasmanian Parks and Wildlife Service and Forestry Tasmania.

== Guidelines for survival ==
Local authorities provide education and information for residents in bushfire-prone regions regarding the location of current fires, preservation of life and property and when to escape by car.

== Major bushfires in Australia ==
Bushfires have accounted for over 800 deaths in Australia since 1851 and, in 2012, the total accumulated cost was estimated at $1.6 billion. In terms of monetary cost however, they rate behind the damage caused by drought, severe storms, hail, and cyclones, perhaps because they most commonly occur outside highly populated urban areas. The 2009 Black Saturday bushfires in Victoria claimed 173 lives over 21 days – the largest number of deaths recorded for any individual Australian bushfire or bushfire season, leading to the event becoming the worst bushfire in Australian history. However, the severe fires of the summer of 2019–2020 affected densely populated areas including holiday destinations leading NSW Rural Fire Services Commissioner, Shane Fitzsimmons, to claim it was "absolutely" the worst bushfire season on record.

== See also ==
- Aerial firefighting and forestry in southern Australia
- List of Australian bushfire seasons
- List of fires in Canada
- List of major bushfires in Australia
- List of natural disasters in Australia
- McArthur Forest Fire Danger Index
- Pyrotron, a device designed to help firefighters better understand how to combat the rapid spread of bush fires
- Wildfires in the United States
