= 2016 Tasmanian bushfires =

Bushfires in Tasmania, Australia

2016 Tasmanian Bushfires
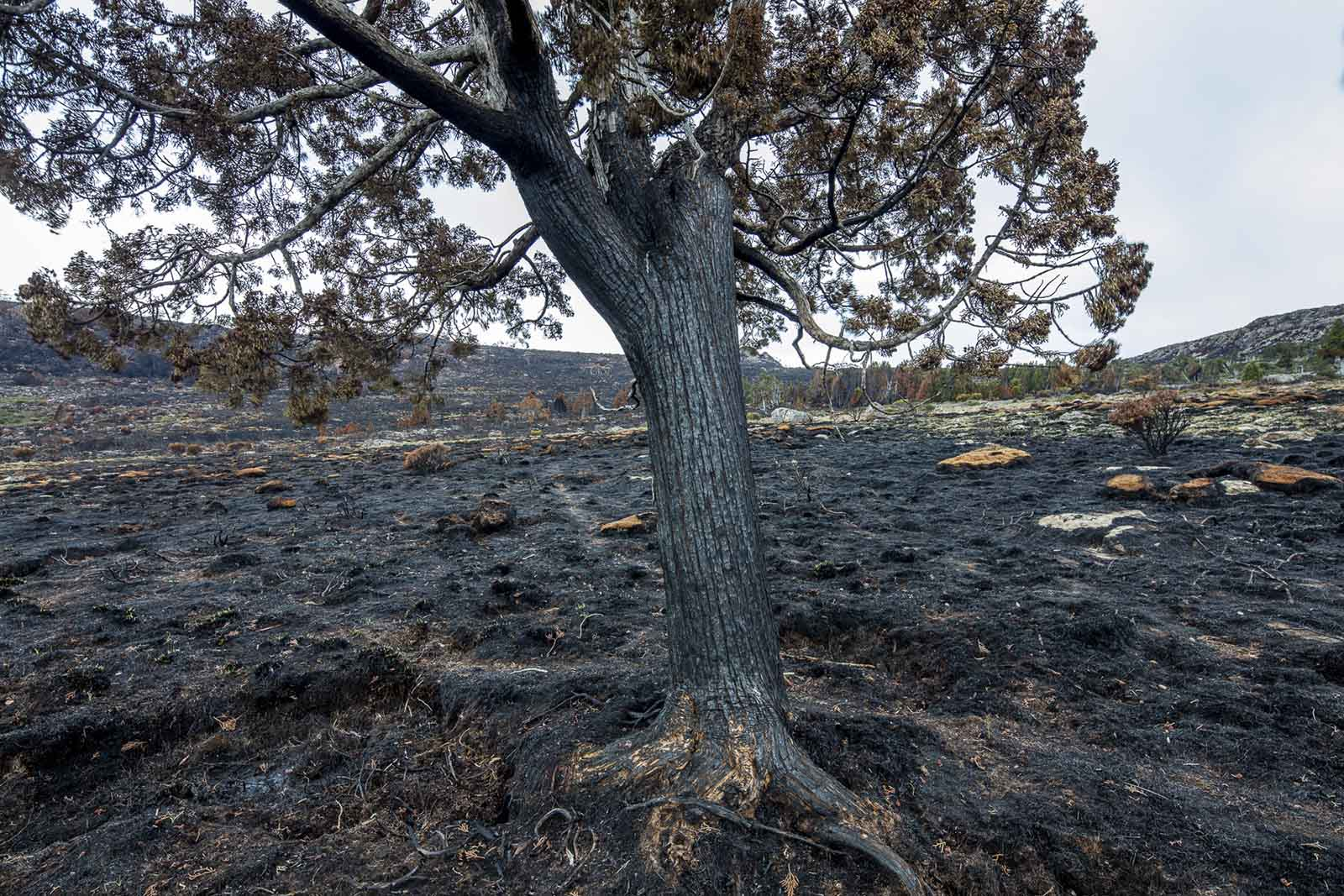
- Cushion plant and pencil pine, Lake Mackenzie fire, Tasmania
- Date: January 2016-autumn 2016
- Location: Central Highlands as well multiple locations in Western, North-Western, South Western and Southern Tasmania

Statistics
- Burned area: 100,000 hectares (250,000 acres) +
- Land use: World Heritage reserves,

Impacts
- Injuries: 1 firefighter

Ignition
- Cause: Lightning, arson

The 2016 Tasmanian Bushfires were a large series of bushfires in Tasmania which started in January 2016 throughout the state, and continued into February 2016, with considerable damage to fire sensitive areas in the Central Highlands, West Coast and South West regions. By autumn 2016, no bushfires were reported within the state.

== Number of fires ==
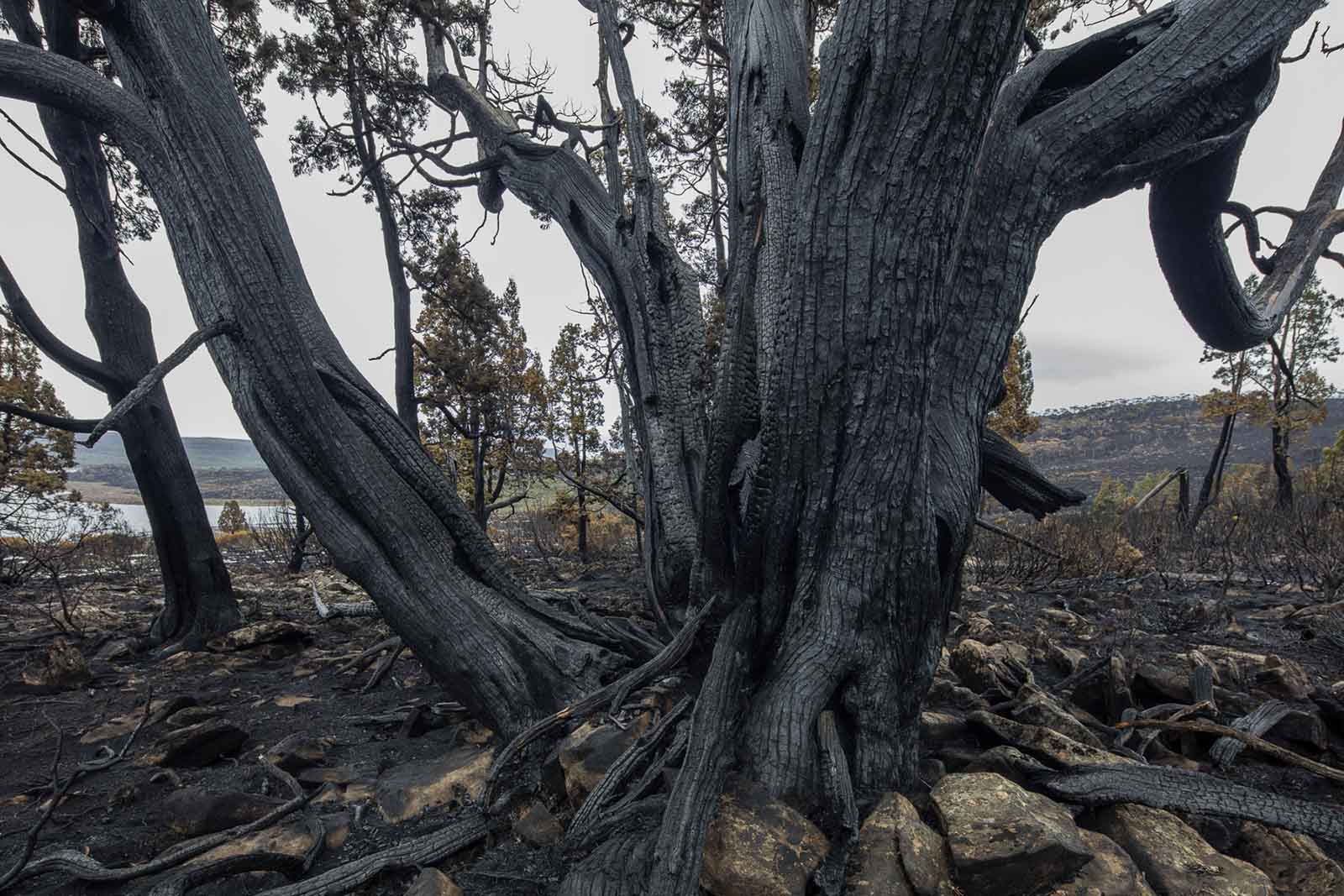
Burnt thousand year old pencil pine, Mackenzie fire, Tasmania.

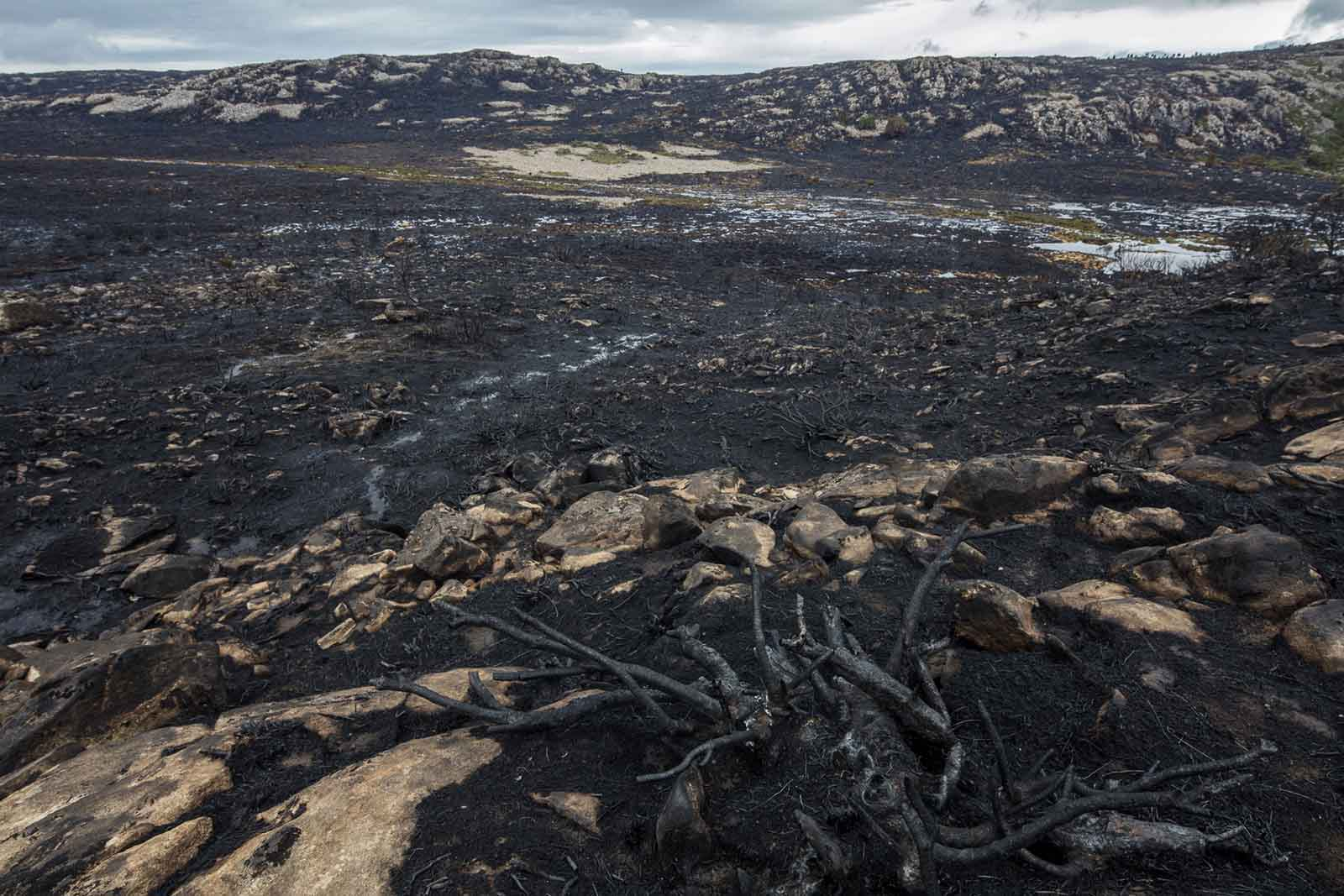
Burnt alpine vegetation, Lake Mackenzie fire, Tasmanian Wilderness World Heritage Area.

Over the first 20 days of the fires, the actual number reported was larger in number, however at least 70 separate fires had been listed in the North West, West, South West and Central Highland areas of the island.

These fires are different from the 2013 Tasmanian bushfires due to their spread, and to the large number being started by lightning strikes, and from the 1967 Tasmanian bushfires with no loss of human life.

== Central Highlands ==
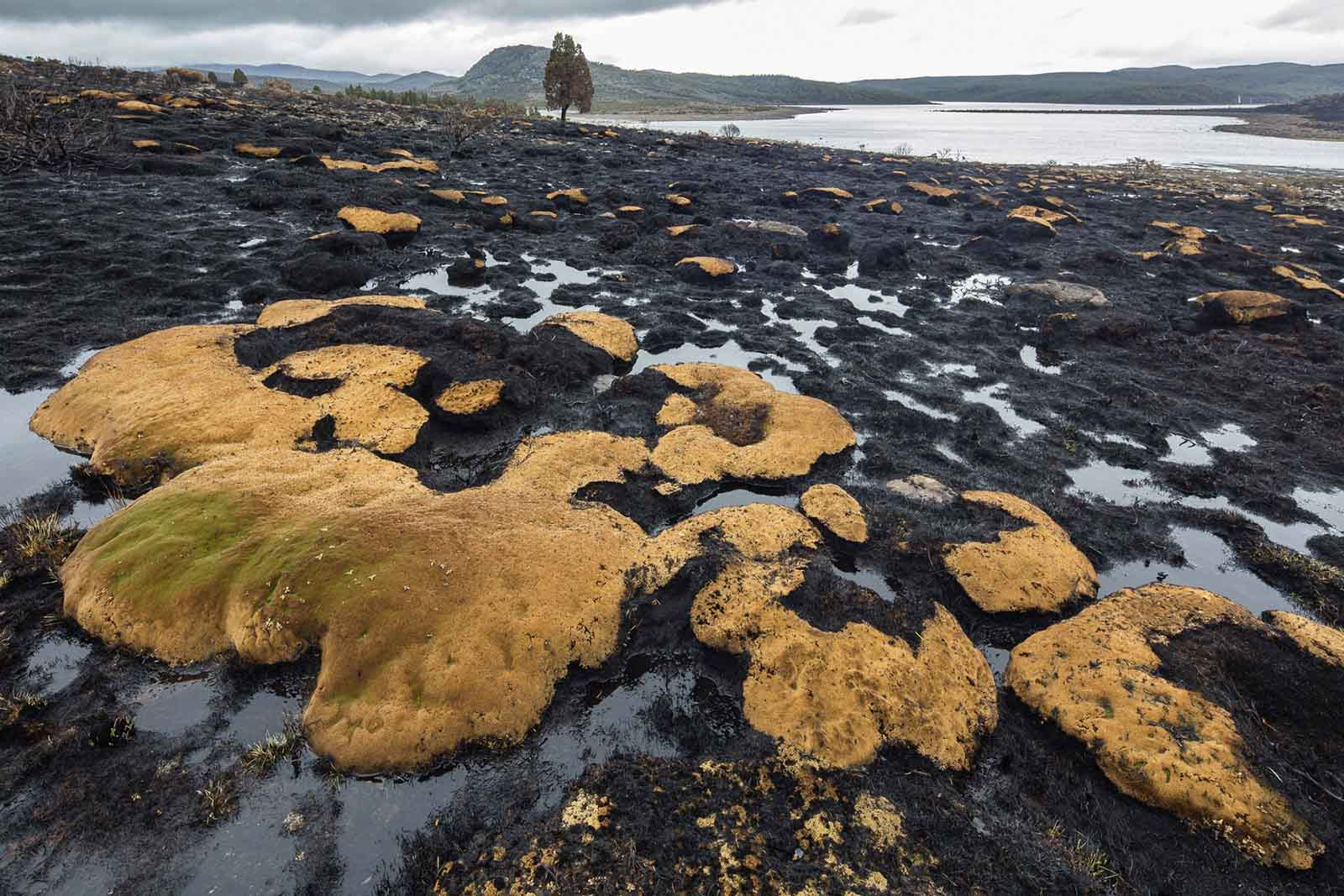
Cushion plant and pencil pine, Mackenzie fire, Tasmania.

Although not significant in terms of property loss, the impact on the Central Highlands and the World Heritage Area lands has been claimed to be catastrophic. the destruction of the heritage areas achieved international attention.

The Overland Track was evacuated due to the fires. The north west fires were well documented in the local newspaper the Advocate in the fires of 21 January.

== Rainfall ==
Due to the remoteness and inaccessibility of a large number of fires, rainfall after the fires started was not enough to extinguish them and was also hindering firefighters.

The fires continued on into February 2016, with containment of only a limited number of fires.

== Heritage area burn size ==
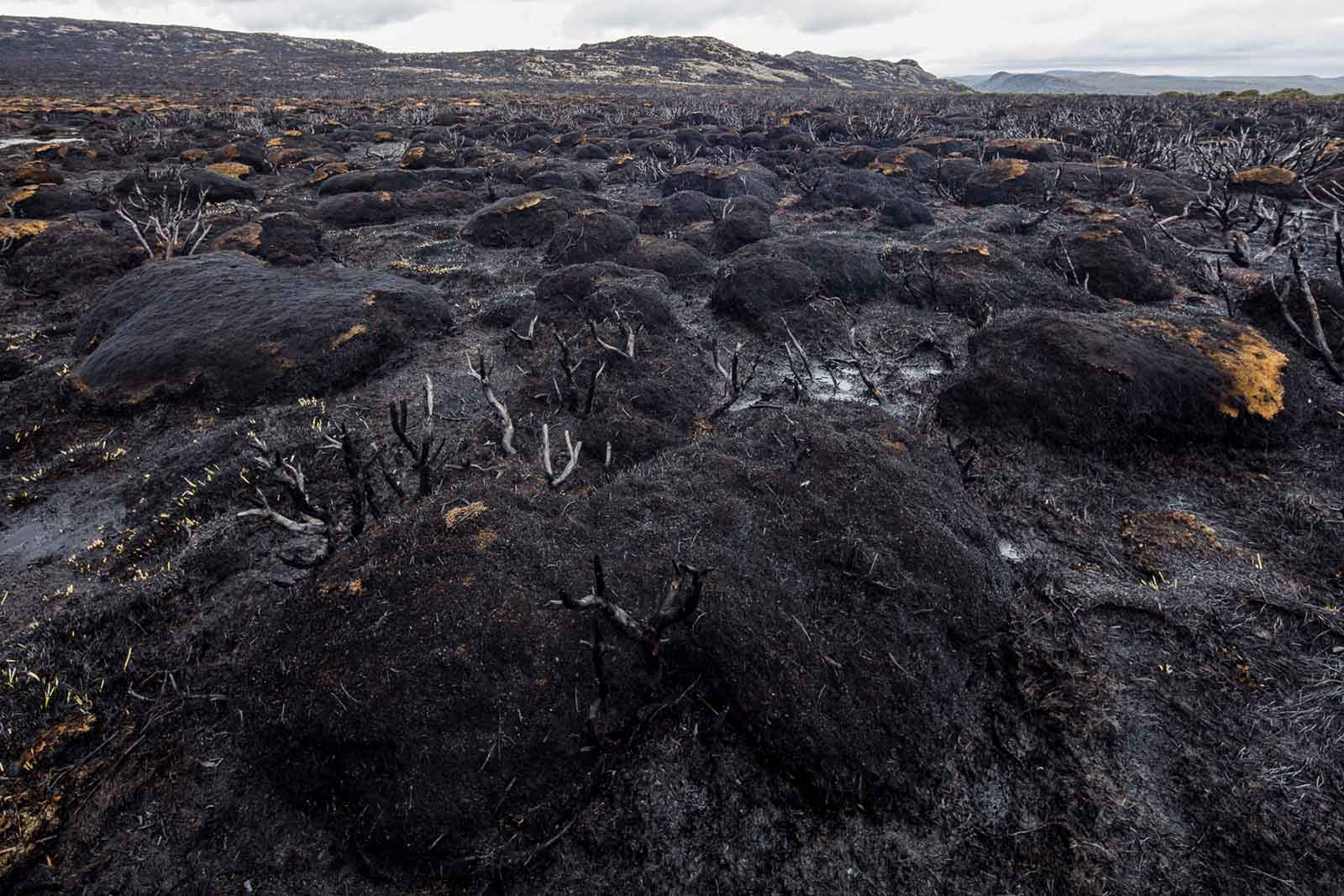
Burnt cushion plants and alpine vegetation, Lake Mackenzie fire, Tasmanian Wilderness World Heritage Area.

The Tasmania Fire Service chief officer Gavin Freeman claimed little harm was done to the heritage areas stating that 18,000 hectares of heritage area as being the area affected. The Tasmanian Tourism Industry Council chief executive officer Luke Martin subsequently made a claim that 11,000ha of the world heritage area was affected.

The total burnt area in all areas has been stated to be above 95,000 hectares (234,750 acres).

The modelling, supplied by University of Tasmania environment postdoctoral fellow Dr Grant Williamson, reveals more than 14 per cent of the 97,000ha burnt by the recent fires were in World Heritage Areas – an area that latest TFS figures suggest has increased – and another 25 per cent in conservation or national park areas.

The effect of the fire on some ecological areas is considered to have been irreversible by some experts, and simulate the effect of climate change on the affected areas. Jamie Kirkpatrick, a University of Tasmania academic, reflected upon the lack of inherent dispersal techniques on some of the flora species for regeneration as being a major problem.

== First month ==
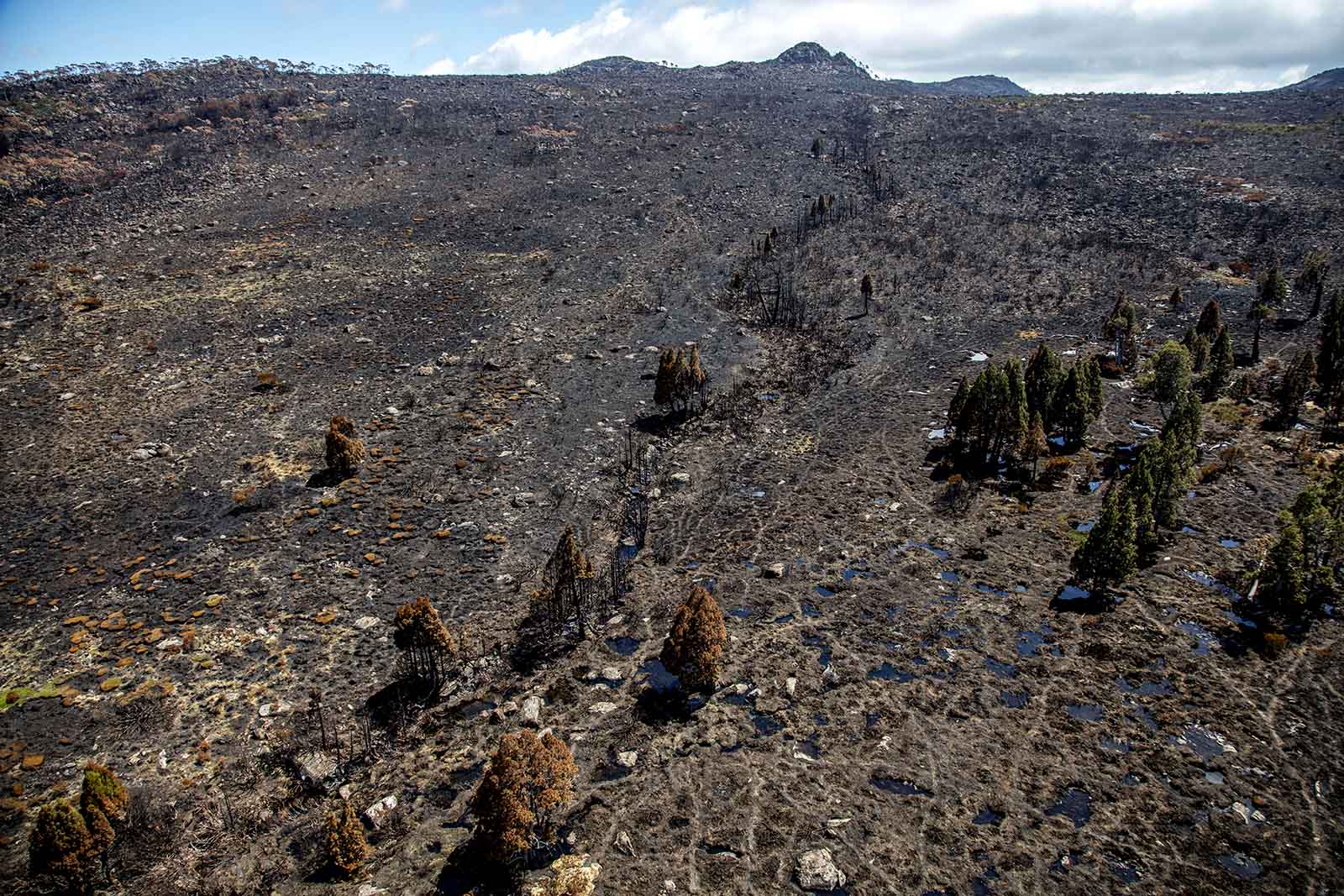
Burnt alpine vegetation including pencil pines, Lake Mackenzie region, Tasmanian Wilderness World Heritage Area.

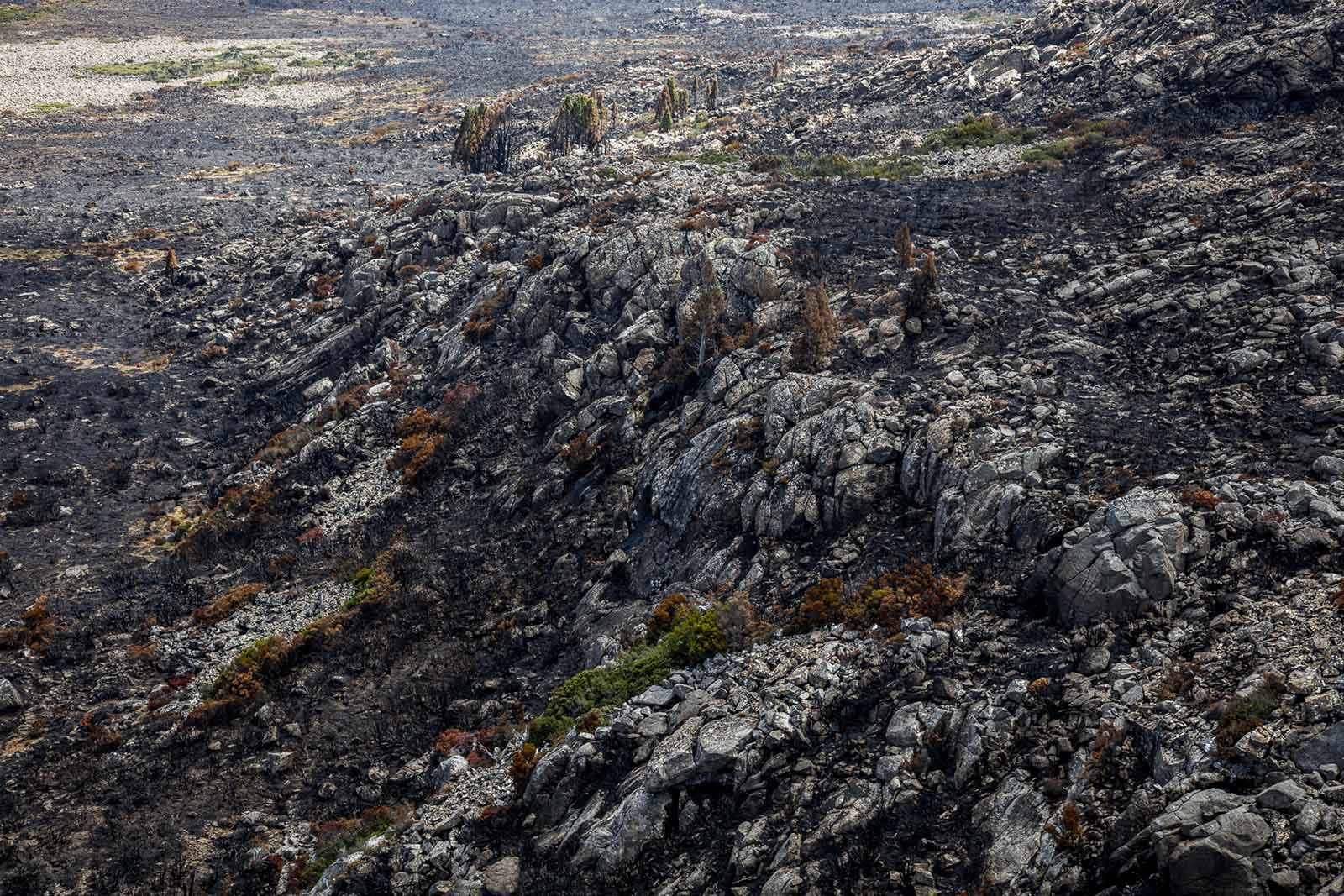
Burnt alpine vegetation including pencil pines, Lake Mackenzie region, Tasmanian Wilderness World Heritage Area.

Authorities expressed concern about accessing fire affected areas, with prospects for further flare ups in the event of high temperatures and conditions for fires increasing again.

By the beginning of February 2016, the number of the fires was claimed to be down to 50, and various factors were seen in favour of further reduction of fires.

Continued operations on remote world heritage areas appeared on the public record, and images of Remote Area Firefighters (RATS)were published as well as further photos of damaged areas.

As at the weekend of 6 and 7 February 2016, there were allegedly 20 fires still going.

=== Selection of vegetation fires active in February 2016 ===
Selected list fires known in February, with the date and time of reporting update from the Fire Service. (Note: This not a comprehensive fires at any one day or area, but a sample of the locations as reported at the Tasmanian Fire Service website in the second week of February.) Some of the fires listed have been going for more than three weeks, and the date and time does not represent the length of time they have been burning.

- Gordon river road Mount Cullen, south west 08-Feb 19:10
- Freeman place, Arthur river 07-Feb 23:13
- Elliot range, southwest 07-Feb 19:35
- Gordon plains, florentine 07-Feb 17:36
- Horton river, west coast 07-Feb 14:25
- Schofield creek, southwest 08-Feb 15:39
- Dohertys range (south), southwest 08-Feb 15:45
- Bull bottom, Mathinna 07-Feb 16:41
- Lindsay river, west coast 08-Feb 15:40
- Tully river, west coast 08-Feb 15:40
- Companion road, Hampshire 07-Feb 16:46
- Basils road, Hampshire 08-Feb 15:46
- Mxwell river, southwest 08-Feb 19:25
- Lyons river, west coast 07-Feb 16:59
- East of Pipeline road, Savage river 07-Feb 16:53
- Savage river north, Savage river 07-Feb 16:44
- Savage river south, Savage river 07-Feb 16:44
- Montagu swamp, Togari 07-Feb 16:43
- Salmon river road, togari 07-Feb 16:42
- Browns creek road, bakers beach 07-Feb 16:41
- Trail creek track, zeehan 07-Feb 16:41
- Neck island, strahan 08-Feb 15:47
- Cape sorell, macquarie heads 07-Feb 16:39
- Murchison highway, tullah 07-Feb 16:38
- Mount Bertha, southwest 07-Feb 16:38
- Little Donaldson river, west coast 08-Feb 15:43
- Norway range, southwest 08-Feb 19:22
- Wuthering heights road, temma 07-Feb 16:34
- Julius river, west coast 08-Feb 15:35
- Tyndall reserve, west coast 07-Feb 16:32
- Coldstream river 2nd fire, Waratah 07-Feb 16:28
- Stephens rivulet, west coast 08-Feb 15:42
- Misery flat, west coast 07-Feb 16:23
- Pipeline road, Savage river 07-Feb 16:22
- Sticht range, west coast 07-Feb 16:21
- Maxwell river (south), southwest 08-Feb 19:18
- Princess range, southwest 08-Feb 19:12
- Sumac road, west coast 07-Feb 16:16
- Pieman road, Tullah 07-Feb 16:15
- Huskissons drive, tullah 08-Feb 15:32
- Ocean beach, Strahan 07-Feb 16:13
- Blackwater road, Temma 07-Feb 16:11
- Dove river conservation, Cradle Mountain 07-Feb 16:10
- Scorpion creek, southwest 08-Feb 18:45
- Goulds sugarloaf, southwest 07-Feb 16:06
- Loddon range, southwest 08-Feb 18:40
- Gould point, southwest 07-Feb 16:05
- Griffiths creek, southwest 08-Feb 18:39
- Dohertys range, southwest 08-Feb 16:01
- Quinton creek, Waratah 07-Feb 16:01
- Heazlewood, Waratah 07-Feb 15:57
- Hangmans creek, Corinna 07-Feb 15:57
- Little henty river, west coast 07-Feb 15:50
- Pipeline road, west coast 08-Feb 15:30
- Donaldson river 2nd fire, west coast 07-Feb 15:49
- Donaldson river 1st fire, west coast 07-Feb 15:48
- Coast line between Temma to Sandy cape including Kenneth bay
- Waratah road, Waratah 07-Feb 15:40
- Lyell highway, southwest 08-Feb 15:26
- Anthony road, west coast 08-Feb 15:26
- Watsons creek, Zeehan 08-Feb 15:29
- Heemskirk road, Zeehan 08-Feb 15:22
- Zeehan highway, Zeehan 08-Feb 15:18

== Damage assessment ==
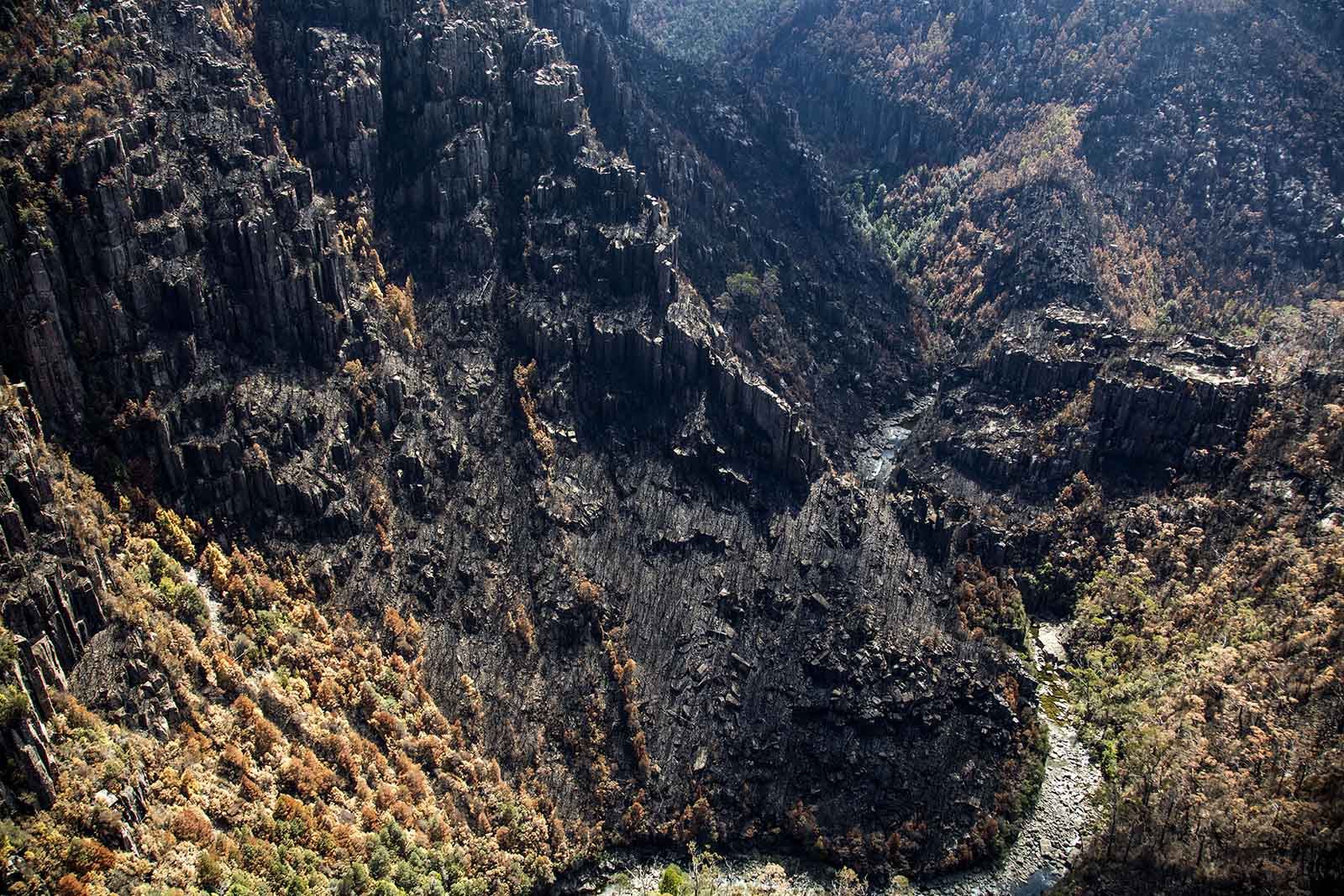
Burnt highland rainforest and pencil pines, Devils Gullet, Lake Mackenzie region, Tasmanian Wilderness World Heritage Area.

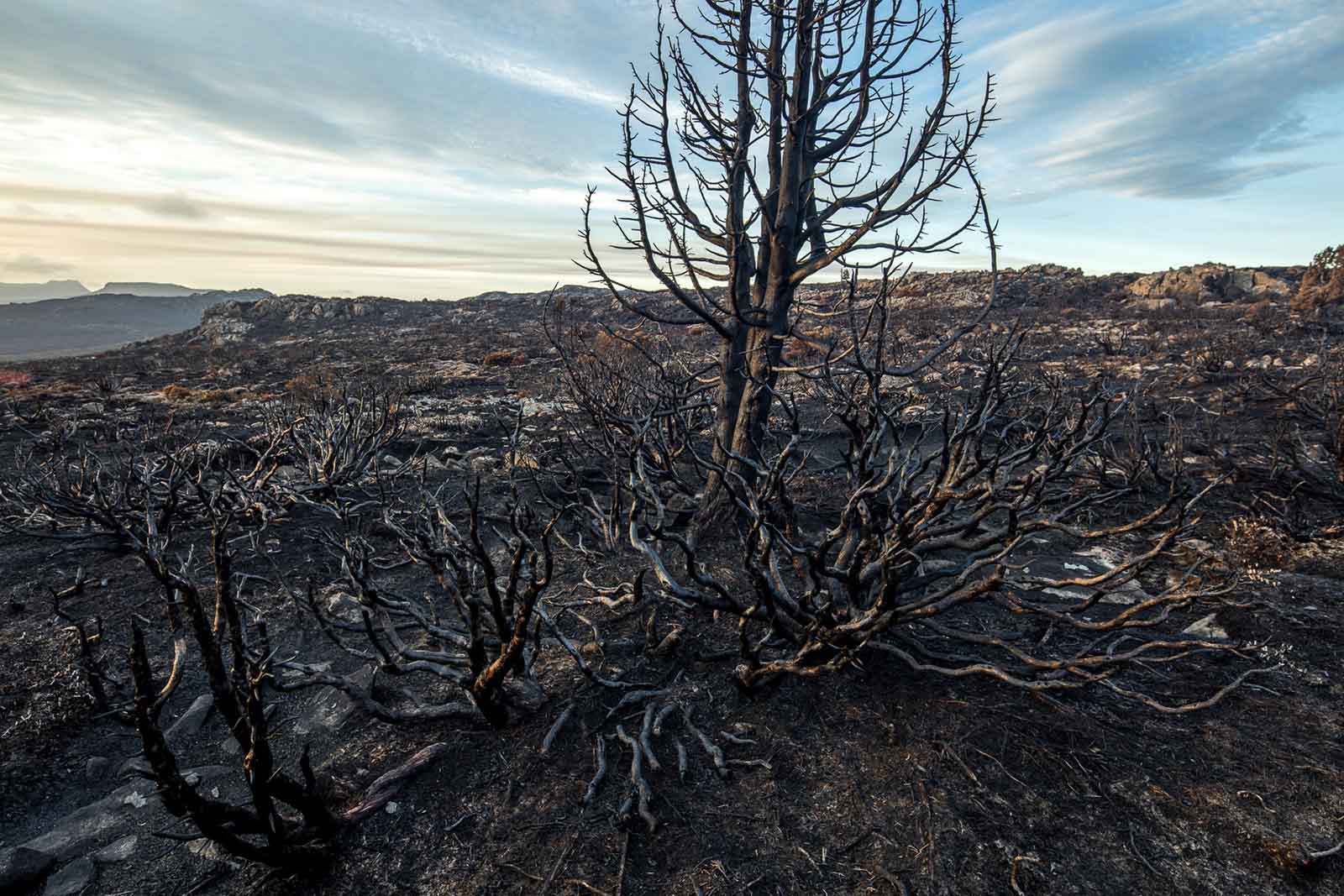
Burnt pencil pine and alpine flora, Mackenzie fire, Tasmania.

Investigations by specialist crews of the extent of damage fires have wrought commenced in February with the first focus on fire grounds near Cradle Mountain and Lake Mackenzie in the Central Plateau. In those regions fire has scorched unique alpine flora such as Cushion plant and Pencil Pine that do not readily regenerate.

Political agendas are clearly indicated in the usage of photography by the Tasmanian government and environmentalists in the choice of location and style of photography, and for outsiders with little access to independent and overall views, the lack of higher level inquiry into the impact of the fires will probably maintain potential confusion.

== External help ==
Over 200 remote area firefighters from interstate and New Zealand have been used in fighting the fires.

In February, the Australian Senate Estimates Committee was told that Tasmanian fire authorities turned down an Emergency Management Australia offer to send in defence assistance. This claim was rejected by the Tasmanian fire service.

== Second month ==
The number of reported fires in early February was at 73 with 26 out of control, and expected time to control to be another month of fires.

The impact on the east coast and Hobart was mainly in smoke being blown in from the south west fires. similarly Launceston experienced smoke from north-west fires.

The time taken to have the number of fires to come under control has been stated in terms of patience.

== Water bombing ==
A series of water bombing flights by aeroplanes from interestate occurred on 12 February on a north-west fire - it included a DC10-bomber, C130-bomber and an Avro RJ85 from Avalon Airport in Melbourne.

== Changing weather conditions ==
In over 30 days of fires, changes in weather conditions were challenging and interstate assistance was re-utilised more than once. By mid February, weather had changed again with snow reported in the highlands.

== Controversy over damage to the environment and world heritage areas ==
Fire ecologists have stated that some of the dead trees killed by the bushfires were more than 1000 years old and part of a confined, Gondwana-era ecosystem unique to Tasmania that in some cases has never burned before. Pictures of burnt areas and vegetation taken by conservationists have prompted warnings that the alpine ecosystem could be completely lost within decades unless more was done to protect it, given the increased risk of fire due to climate change.

Tasmanian Premier Will Hodgman stated that the fires have had a "devastating impact", but the extent of the damage has been distorted. He said the fire has burned about 1.2 per cent of the world heritage zone and was "not insignificant, but it could have been much worse" and "It's damn ordinary that you've got environmental activists almost gleefully capitalising on images, naturally caused, which could inflict significant damage on our brand, our reputation".

== February 2016 and onwards ==
In late February at least 20 fires were still burning. The fires ended by autumn, and as of October 2016, none were burning in the state.

== Senate inquiry ==
In March 2016 a Senate inquiry was announced.

== Post-fire ecosystem recovery ==
The Tasmanian Government and University of Tasmania are undertaking research and environmental monitoring programs in burnt alpine and subalpine ecosystems near Lake Mackenzie to investigate long-term ecological impacts and recovery. Severely burnt pencil pine and Sphagnum vegetation showed very little recovery one year after the fires, however regrowth was evident in alpine heath, cushion plants and sedgeland.

== See also ==
- 1967 Tasmanian bushfires
- 2013 Tasmanian bushfires
