= Como West Public School =

Location
- Como West, New South Wales; Australia; 34.0047°S 151.0604°E

Information
- Type: Public, comprehensive primary
- Motto: Our Best Always
- Established: 1950
- Principal: Felicity Young
- Grades: Kindergarten to Year 6
- Enrolment: 271, as of 2025.
- Colours: Blue and yellow
- Website: Como West Public School Website

Como West Public School is a comprehensive public primary (K–6) school located in the Sydney suburb of Como West, New South Wales, Australia. As of 2007, it had an enrolment of 290 students. Now it is suspected to have more than 320 students. Typically, graduating students from Como West move on to The Jannali High School.

== History ==
The school was established in 1950. However, it was destroyed by the bushfires in 1994 and then the school was rebuilt on the original land in 1995.

== 75th Anniversary ==
Como West Public School had its 75th anniversary in 2025.

== Prayer controversy ==
A major controversy erupted in 1996 when a prayer, said at morning assembly, was banned without local consultation. Christopher Downy and Fred Nile raised the matter in the New South Wales Legislative Assembly on 29 October 1996. After taking legal advice, Jeffrey Shaw ruled on 4 December 1996 that the prayer was acceptable.

== Facilities ==
The school received a major state grant of $143,999 to upgrade its IT facilities.

In June 2008 the state tendered for an extension to the school library.

== See also ==
- 1994 Eastern seaboard fires
- List of Government schools in New South Wales
