= Jannali =

- Suburb
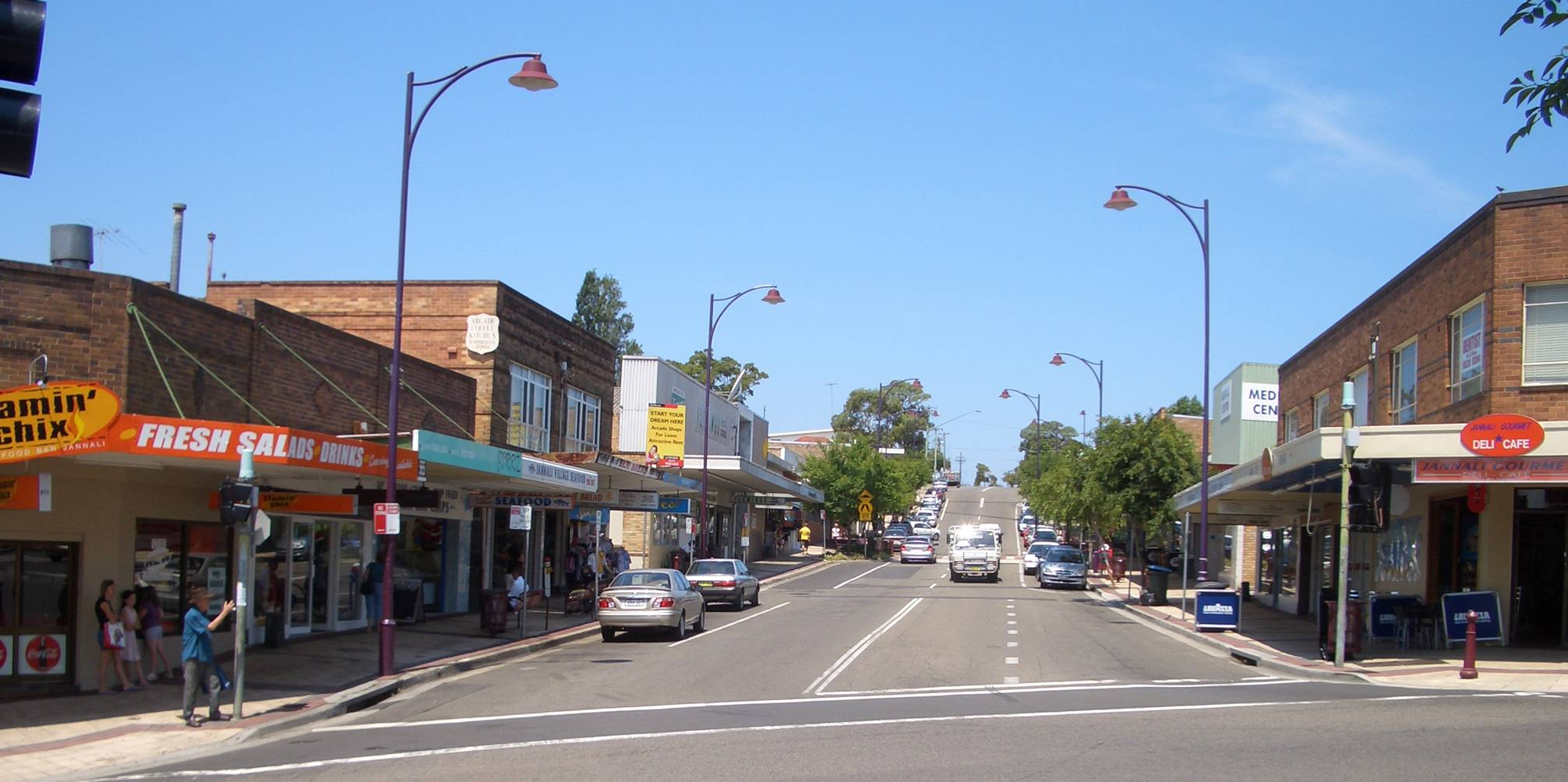
- Box Road, Jannali viewing east up shopping strip.

- Interactive map of Jannali
- Country: Australia
- State: New South Wales
- City: Sydney
- LGA: Sutherland Shire
- Location: 28 km (17 mi) south of Sydney CBD

Government
  - State electorate: Miranda
  - Federal divisions: Hughes; Cook
- Elevation: 69 m (226 ft)

Population
  - Total: 6,632 (2021 census)
- Postcode: 2226
Suburbs around Jannali
Como	Oyster Bay	Kareela
Bonnet Bay	Jannali	Sylvania
Woronora Heights	Sutherland	Kirrawee

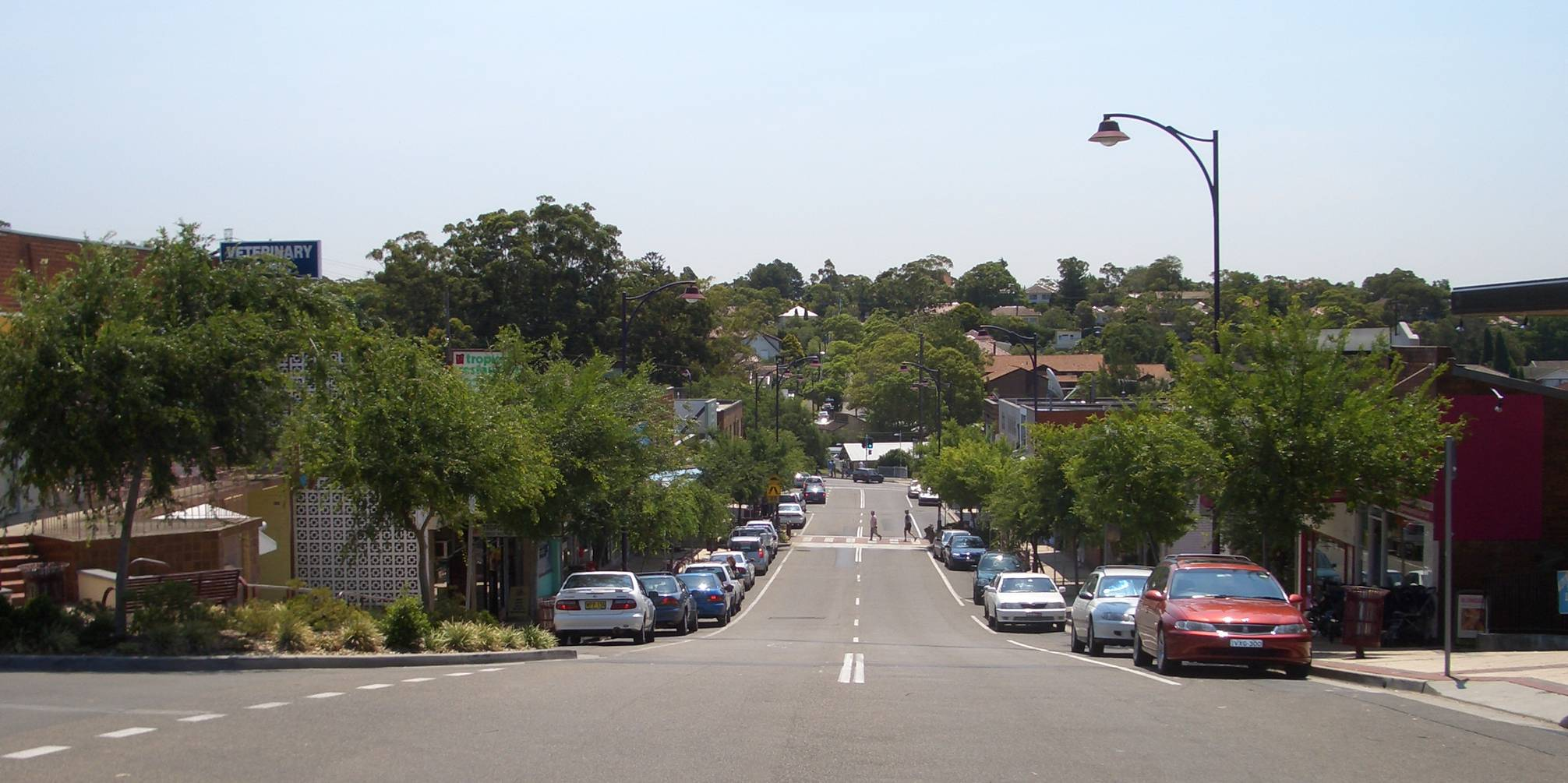
Box Road, Jannali viewing west down shopping strip

Jannali is a suburb in southern Sydney, in the state of New South Wales, Australia. Jannali is located 28 kilometres south of the Sydney central business district in the local government area of the Sutherland Shire. The majority of land use in Jannali is residential and bushland reserve, while the suburb is bisected by the north–south railway line. The majority of Jannali's enterprises are located close to the suburb's railway station.

== History ==
Jannali is an Aboriginal word, meaning the Place of the Moon, originating from an unknown language as recorded by George Thornton. The Dharug language word for the Moon is 'yanada', and Jannali may be an alternative Anglicization of this.

The area began to develop with the arrival of the railway line in 1884. However, the railway station at Jannali was not built until 1931. The department of railways paid for the construction of the railway station and ramps while the local council paid for the road bridge over the line at the southern end of the station. This attracted residents to the suburb and many more homes were built after World War II when blocks of land were offered to returned servicemen.

Jannali had a 10-court squash centre between 1978 and 2001. The building has been demolished and offices and apartments built on the site. During the existence of the squash centre, Jannali Squash Club, which leased courts at the centre, produced many players of first grade standard and in the mid-1980s was considered Sydney's leading Squash Club and one of the strongest in Australia.

On the morning of 21 April 2021, local residents at a block in Jannali woke up to smoke and flames when a fire broke out on the top floor as it spread towards the roof. 30 firefighters worked to contain the blaze, which resulted in the hospitalisation of one man, who was later treated for smoke inhalation.

== Transport ==
Jannali railway station is on the Illawarra line of the Sydney Trains network. Access to the platform for city-bound trains and the railway ticket office is off Janalli Avenue, while access to the platform for south-bound trains is off Railway Crescent.

U-Go Mobility buses (routes 967 and 968) link Jannali to Westfield Miranda, Oyster Bay, Kareela, Como West and Bonnet Bay.

== Commercial and community-based enterprises ==
Shops and commercial businesses provide a broad range of services to the Jannali community. Most are centred on the main transport hub of the railway station and the bridge over the railway line. This bridge provides the only link for both automotive and pedestrian movement between the eastern and western portions of the Jannali community.

While the majority of enterprises are located on the eastern side of the railway line, i.e. along Railway Crescent and Box Road, further enterprises are located in White Street (off Railway Crescent). A small group of business are situated in Jannali Avenue on the western side of the railway line, as is Sutherland Shire Council's Kurranulla Aboriginal Resources Centre and the community hall.

== Parks ==
The residential streets feature many houses, units, and local reserves which contain a diversity of flora and fauna. Jannali Reserve is a large recreational area on the western border. Playgrounds in the area include Charles Orwin Reserve (2 Davey Street, Jannali) and Alice Street Reserve (8 Alice Street, Jannali).

== Education ==
The suburb has three public schools: The Jannali High School, Jannali Public School & Jannali East Public School. The Jannali High School was formed in 1992 from the amalgamation of Jannali Girls' High School (1953) and Jannali Boys' High School (1956). Jannali East primary opened in 1956.

The St George & Sutherland Community College (SGSCC) is housed in the former Jannali Girls High School grounds. SGSCC has over 40 staff and operates a range of courses including leisure, work skills, disability, international, school-age coaching, English, including courses at Diploma to Certificate IV levels.

== Churches ==
There are several denominations of Christian churches in the suburb: Jannali Anglican Church, Jannali Uniting Church, Jannali Presbyterian Church, Jannali Congregational Church, Seechange Community Church.

== Sport ==
The local soccer team is Como West–Jannali Junior Soccer Club, based at Jannali Oval. Jannali also has a baseball club known as the "Comets", based at the playing fields at Soldiers Rd. The local rugby league team is the Como-Jannali Crocodiles who are based at Scylla Bay Oval in nearby Como.

As part of the boom in Squash in the late 1970s, on 30 October 1978, a new, state-of-the-art squash centre was opened by a local Member of Parliament. Maurie Keane at 48–54 Railway Crescent. The centre featured 10 competition squash courts, a gymnasium, and a sports therapist underneath. The centre closed in 2001, the squash boom having long ended, however during its time, the Jannali Squash Club rose to be one of the strongest in the country, winning several men's and women's first-grade premierships and at times reaching over 200 playing members from Jannali and neighbouring suburbs.

== Population ==
In the 2021 census, there were 6,632 people in Jannali, of whom 74.3% were born in Australia. The next most common countries of birth were England 4.7%, and China 2.2%. 81.9% of people spoke only English at home. Other languages spoken at home included Mandarin at 2.0%. The top responses for religious affiliation were No Religion 38.2%, Catholic 23.4%, and Anglican 14.8%. The median weekly household income of $2,220 was higher than the national figure of $1,746.

== Notable residents ==
- Bill Collins, movie critic and television presenter
- Clive James, author
- Ray Martin, television presenter
- Adam Hills, television presenter

== See also ==
- 1994 Eastern seaboard fires
