= 1967 Tasmanian fires =

Series of bushfires in Australia

1967 "Black Tuesday" Tasmanian Bushfires
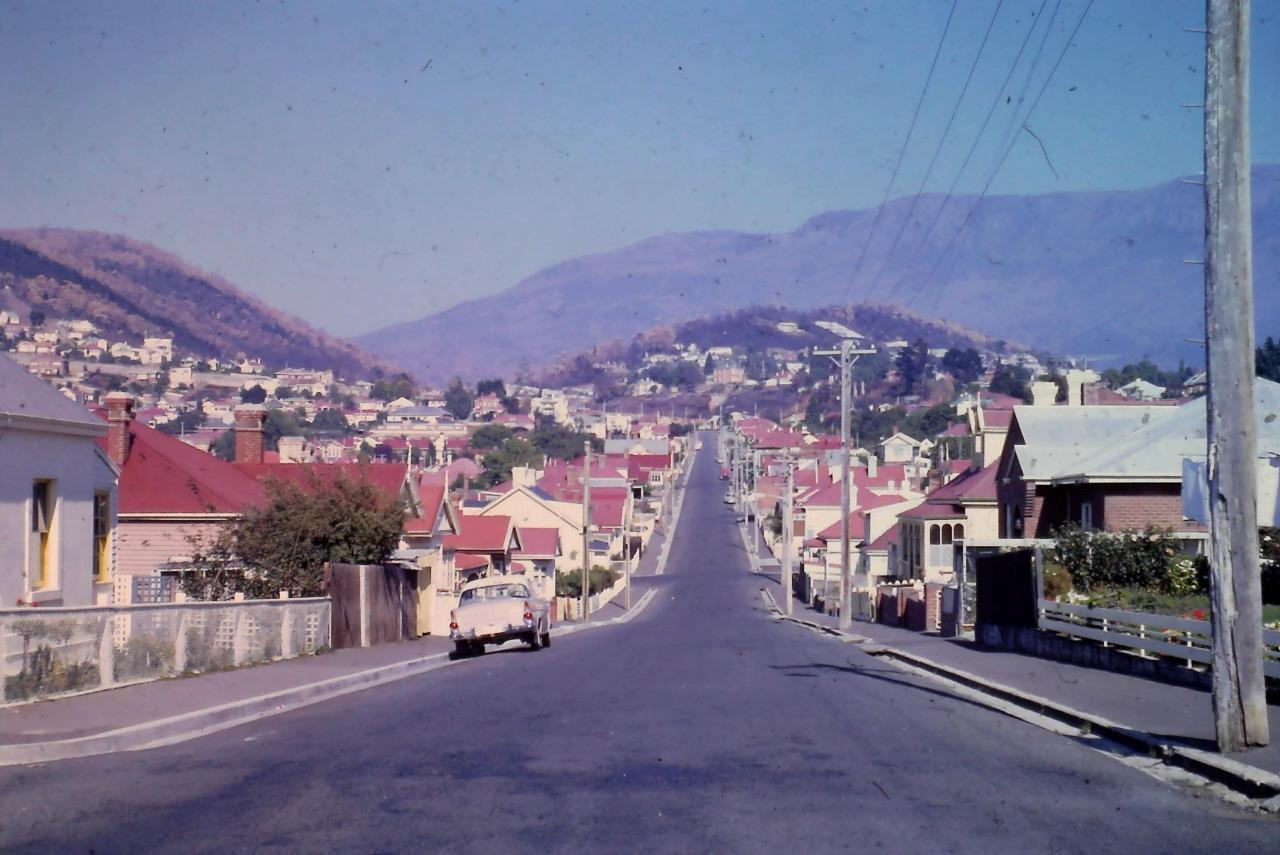
- Burnt hills from Princes St, Sandy Bay, Hobart
- Date: 7 February 1967
- Location: Throughout Tasmania

Statistics
- Burned area: 2,642.7 square kilometres (653,025 acres)

Impacts
- Deaths: 64
- Injuries: 900+
- Structures lost: 1,293 houses
- Cost: A$101,000,000

Ignition
- Cause: heat wave, back-burning, arson

The 1967 Tasmanian fires were an Australian natural disaster which occurred on 7 February 1967, an event which came to be known as the Black Tuesday bushfires. They were the most deadly bushfires that Tasmania has ever experienced, leaving 64 people dead, 900 injured and over seven thousand homeless.

== Extent of the fires ==
110 separate fire fronts burnt through some 2,640 square kilometres (652,000 acres) of land in southern Tasmania within the space of five hours. Fires raged from near Hamilton and Bothwell to the D'Entrecasteaux Channel as well as Snug. There was extensive damage to agricultural property along the Channel, the Derwent Valley and the Huon Valley. Fires also destroyed forest, public infrastructure and properties around Mount Wellington and many small towns along the Derwent estuary and east of Hobart.

== Death toll and damage ==
The worst of the fires was the Hobart Fire, which encroached upon the city of Hobart. In total, the fires claimed 64 lives in a single day. Property loss was also extensive with 1293 homes and over 1700 other buildings destroyed. The fires destroyed 80 bridges, 4800 sections of power lines, 1500 motor vehicles and over 100 other structures. It was estimated that at least 62,000 farm animals were killed. The total damage amounted to $40,000,000 in 1967 Australian dollar values. The resulting insurance payout was the then largest in Australian history. In 2017 2 more people that had died were officially recognised as victims of the bushfires, they had previously been excluded as the deaths had not been investigated by the coroner at the time. This took the death toll from 62 to 64 people.

== Causes ==
The late winter and early spring of 1966 had been wet over southeastern Tasmania, resulting in a large amount of vegetation growth by November. However, in November, Tasmania began its driest eight-month period since 1885, and by the end of January 1967 the luxuriant growth in the area had dried off. Though January was a cool month, hot weather began early in February, so that in the days leading up to 7 February 1967, several bush fires were burning uncontrolled in the areas concerned. Some of these fires had been deliberately lit for burning off, despite the extremely dry conditions at the time. Reports into the causes of the fire stated that only 22 of the 110 fires were started accidentally.

Shortly before midday on the 7th, a combination of extremely high temperatures, (the maximum was 39 °C (102 °F)), very low humidity and very strong winds from the northwest led to disaster.

Although this fire was by far the worst in loss of life and property in Tasmanian history, the meteorological conditions are common. McArthur's report on the fire notes that "very similar conditions have occurred on three or four occasions during the past 70 years."

== Comparison with other major Australian bushfires ==
If considered in terms of both loss of property and loss of life, in 1967 this represented one of the worst disasters to have occurred in Australia. It is comparable in scale with the 1939 Black Friday bushfires in Victoria (where the loss of 72 lives was spread over several days) and the subsequent 1983 Ash Wednesday bushfires in Victoria and South Australia, which claimed 75 lives and razed over 2,000 homes. The 2009 Black Saturday bushfires north of Melbourne, and elsewhere in Victoria, in which 173 people died, share the same commencement date of 7 February.

Australian National University history professor Tom Griffiths has described the 1967 fires as marking the advent of a "new type" of bushfire in which suburban areas of large cities were threatened, contrasting with earlier major fires which had solely occurred in rural areas.

== Memorial ==
A memorial for the 1967 Bushfires was built at Snug in the Kingborough municipality, south of Hobart, where a plaque with the names of the 62 people killed is fixed to a brick chimney. The memorial has storyboards telling the story of the 1967 fires, as well as bushfire preparedness information. It is surrounded by a garden of fire resistant native plants. In 2017 2 more people that had died were officially recognised as victims of the bushfires and added to the plaque making the total 64 people.

== See also ==
- List of disasters in Australia by death toll
- 2013 Tasmanian bushfires
- 2016 Tasmanian bushfires
