= Pyrotron =

The Pyrotron is a device designed to help firefighters better understand how to combat the rapid spread of bush fires in Australia.

== Design and use ==
The Pyrotron consists of a 25m wind tunnel.

It allows researchers to "gain a better understanding of the physical processes involved in the behavior and spread of bush fires under a range of conditions."

Prior tests of the spread of brush fires used to be conducted in open fields. But such tests often yielded inconclusive and frustrating results wind and weather interfered with the tests.

The closed nature of the Pyrotron enables researchers to carry out tests under consistent conditions without need for unpredictable variables. The data of these tests, the CSIRO website notes, is recorded by a myriad of sensors and high speed, as well as thermal cameras. By testing different types of fuel and wind speeds, bushfire researchers are able to create predictive models of the spread of fires based on the local topography of the region at risk, thus enabling firefighters to better combat the conflagrations.
