= Como West =

- Suburb
- Coordinates: 34.002°S 151.061°E
- Country: Australia
- State: New South Wales
- City: Sydney
- LGA: Sutherland Shire
- Postcode: 2226

Como West is a locality in southern Sydney, in the state of New South Wales, Australia. It is located in the western part of the suburb of Como. The postcode is 2226, the same as Como.

Como West is located on the north eastern bank of the Woronora River. It features its own primary school – Como West Public School and sports fields. There is a small shopping area with a motor repair shop, wine cellar, a Chinese restaurant, a veterinarian, doctor, chemist, cafe, butcher, hairdresser and a corner shop. Henry Lawson Park celebrates the name of that great Australian poet.

== History ==
In early 1884, James Frederick Murphy (Manager of the Holt-Sutherland Company Estate) is attributed as being responsible for the renaming of the postal locality previously known as "Woronora" – to "COMO".

Thirty years later on 19 June 1914, the elevated portion of "Como" lying west of the Illawarra Railway line & extending west to the Woronora River is first referred to as "Como Heights" in a local tourism advertisement published in numerous papers around New South Wales.

Six years later on 10 September 1920, the term "Como Heights Estate" appears in a land sale advertisement in The Propellor, Hurstville.

A further six years elapsed, then on 5 June 1926, an article referring to the "West Como Progress Association" is published by the Evening News, Sydney, newspaper.

Thirteen more years elapse, then finally on 9 November 1939 the term "Como West" first appears publicly, via an advertisement by the proprietor of the Como West Post Office which is published in The Propellor, Hurstville.

Many houses and the historic Como West Public School were burnt down during the devastating 1994 bushfires.
