= Aerial firefighting and forestry in southern Australia =

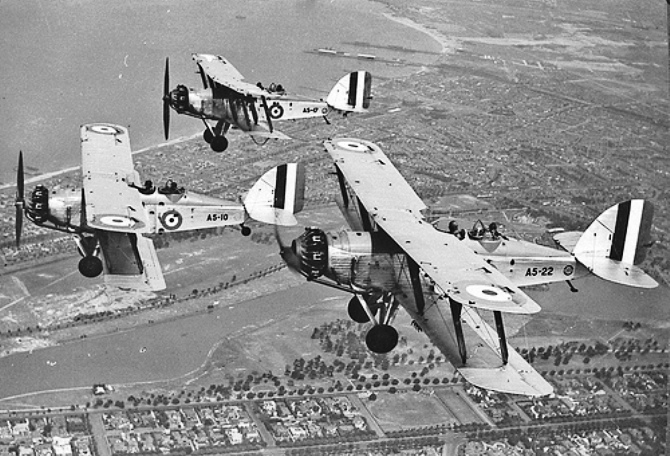
RAAF Westland Wapitis from Point Cook near Melbourne were first engaged on 18 February 1930 by the Forests Commission Victoria for bushfire aerial reconnaissance. Seen here flying in formation over Albert Park Lake.

The development of aerial firefighting and forestry in southern Australia ran in parallel with the rapid improvements in aircraft technology over the last century. As more advanced and capable aircraft became available firefighters and foresters quickly sought opportunities to utilise and adapt them.

Aircraft have three main advantages over ground resources: speed, access, and observation.

Aircraft have been used for a wide range of tasks including reconnaissance, firebombing, crew transport, aerial ignition, back burning, gathering infrared imagery as well as operational forestry tasks like aerial photography, surveys, spraying, fertilising and seeding.

Much of the early pioneering work in Australia was led by the Forests Commission Victoria in collaboration with other State forestry and fire authorities including the Western Australia Forests Department, Forestry Commission of NSW, Woods and Forest Department of South Australia and Forestry Tasmania. Federal agencies including the CSIRO also contributed significantly.

Overseas forest and fire agencies, particularly the US Forest Service, the US Bureau of Land Management and State agencies such as the California Department of Forestry and Fire Protection (CalFire) as well as the Canadian Forest Service faced similar challenges and proved strong and willing partners in sharing knowledge, equipment and expertise over many decades.

== Major bushfires ==
Internationally, southern Australia and particularly the State of Victoria combined with the adjacent States of New South Wales (NSW), South Australia together with the island State of Tasmania, is commonly regarded one of the three landscapes on Earth most prone to damaging bushfires. The other two are southern California and the Mediterranean coast.

Moreover, much of eastern Victoria and alpine parts of NSW are remote, mountainous and inaccessible and bushfires are often caused by multiple lightning strikes which can grow quickly in size. Even with the aid of modern firebombing aircraft to slow the spread of a bushfire, the control of these fires usually remains reliant on ground crews getting to the fire edge to extinguish it completely. Although, heavy rain is sometimes sufficient.

=== History ===
Major Victorian bushfires occurred on Black Thursday in 1851, where an estimated 5 million hectares were burnt, followed by another blaze on Red Tuesday in February 1891 in South Gippsland when about 260,000 hectares were burnt, 12 people died, and more than 2,000 buildings were destroyed. This deadly pattern continued with more major fires on Black Sunday on 14 February 1926 which saw the tally rise to sixty lives being lost and widespread damage to farms, homes and forests. On 7 February 1967, the Black Tuesday bushfires in Tasmania were the worst the State had ever experienced, leaving 62 people dead, 900 injured and over seven thousand homeless.

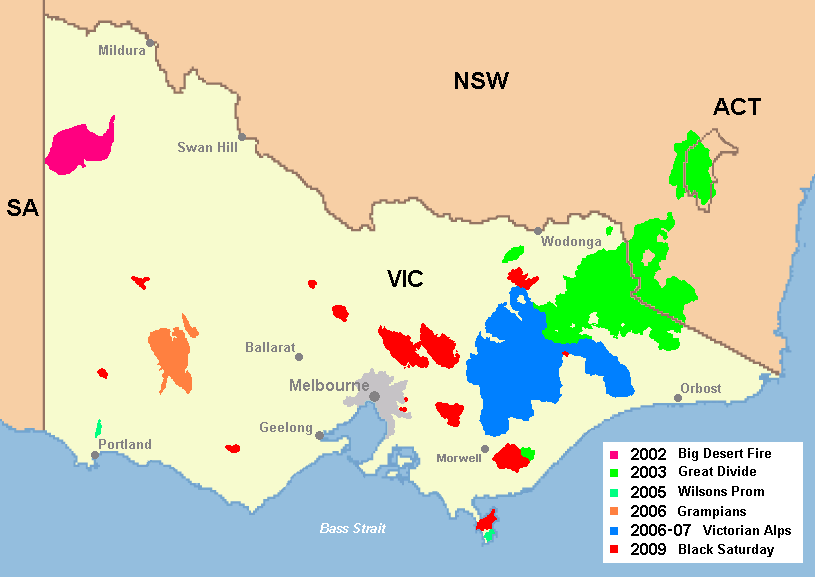
Major bushfires in Victoria between 2002–2009

However, when considered in terms of both loss of property and loss of life, the Black Friday bushfires on 13 January 1939 were one of the worst natural disasters to have occurred in Australia and certainly the worst bushfire up to that time. The 1939 Black Friday fires in Victoria burnt 2 million hectares, 69 mills were destroyed, 71 people died, and several towns were entirely obliterated. Only the Ash Wednesday bushfires in Victoria and South Australia in the summer of 1983 and the Black Saturday bushfires in 2009 have resulted in more fatalities.

Bushfires have undoubtedly always been a feature of Australian summers. In an average year, more than 600 bushfires occur in Victoria's National Parks and State Forests which burn about 110,000 hectares and retardant is used on about 10% of these. However, the impacts of bushfires are expected to rise as a result of population pressures and housing growth along the interface between forests and rural communities. Also, while the impacts of global warming are not fully known, Victoria is very likely to experience an increased number of days with extreme fire danger.

== Bushfire reconnaissance ==
Experience has consistently shown that early detection and aggressive first attack is the key to keeping bushfires small and gives the best chance for control. In the early part of last century, there was limited road access to the extensive mountain forests, particularly in the remote and uninhabited eastern ranges of Victoria so there was a strong level of enthusiasm for aerial bushfire reconnaissance.

While there are differing accounts, it's generally acknowledged that the world's first aerial forest patrol was flown as a demonstration for the US Forest Service on 29 June 1915 at Trout Lake, Wisconsin in a Curtiss Flying Boat by aviation pioneer and wealthy Chicago sportsman Logan “Jack” Vilas. The idea took hold and US Forest Service later joined with the Army Air Service in 1919 to operate regular aerial fire patrols over national forests. However, lack of wireless radios for communication between the pilot and the ground was a major problem and the program paused in 1925.

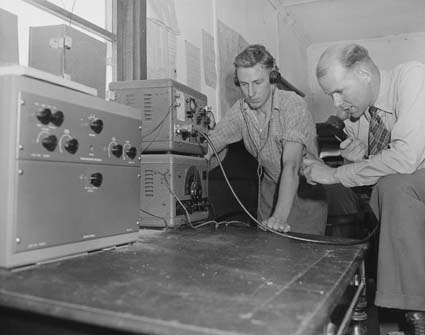
Roly Parke, Forests Commission Victoria, District Forester – 1945. New office radios and heavy RC-16 portable radios enabled firefighters to communicate directly with RAAF reconnaissance aircraft.

Discussion took place between the Forests Commission Victoria (FCV) and the Air Board as early as 1926, and then over a period of years prior to 1929–30, with the view to commencing regular fire patrols using RAAF aircraft but a lack of safe landing areas proved the main obstacle. Eventually, the first fire spotting aircraft in Victoria was deployed on 18 February 1930 when a RAAF Westland Wapiti from No.1 Squadron operating out of Point Cook near Melbourne flew over the nearby Dandenong Ranges. This is also believed to be an Australian first.

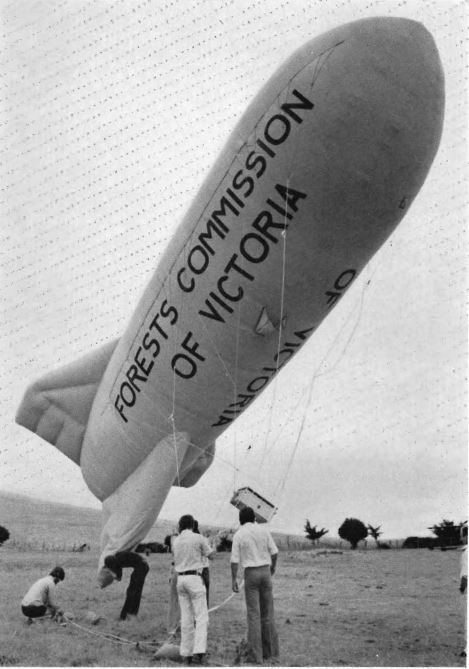
The need to improve communications for firefighting in flat terrain like the deserts of north western Victoria prompted use of balloons to suspend radio relay sets – 1976.

Communications from the aircraft radio were sent in Morse code to the Air Board at RAAF Laverton who then passed the information on to Forests Commission fire controllers. It was claimed that the delay was only a matter of minutes. Over the years effort was focused on more accurately locating fire outbreaks but it was not until the summer of 1939–40 that an aircraft was able to directly communicate by radio with the FCV District Office at Powelltown.

The Royal Commission into the 1939 bushfires conducted by Judge Leonard Edward Bishop Stretton has been described as one of the most significant inquiries in the history of Victorian public administration. Its recommendations led to sweeping changes including stringent regulation of burning and fire safety measures for sawmills, grazing licensees and the general public, the compulsory construction of dugouts at forest sawmills, increasing the forest roads network and firebreaks, construction of forest dams, fire towers and supported further RAAF aerial patrols linked by the Commissions radio network VL3AA to ground observers.

The Forests Commission's communication systems were regarded at the time to be more technicality advanced than the police and the military. These pioneering efforts were directed by Geoff Weste and by 1943–44 direct communication was possible between firefighting crews on the ground using portable, but heavy, RC-16 Radiophones and RAAF aircraft. Although the technology of the portable radios remained primitive and the reception poor unless the user was on a high point somewhere. The HF radio signal was “line-of-sight” and bounced between fire towers and relay transmitters across the mountains back to the district offices. In flat mallee desert country of north western Victoria balloons were used in the 1970s to increase radio coverage. Later the introduction of VHF radios, aeronautical radios operating within the airband and then digital mobile phones revolutionised bushfire communications.

By the summer of 1945–46, 114 flights were made with up to eight RAAF aircraft in the air on bad fire days. They operated from RAAF bases at Point Cook, Ballarat, East Sale and Bairnsdale and reported 438 outbreaks. The following year, RAAF Consolidated B-24 Liberators and Avro Lincoln Bombers were made available, supplemented by Avro Anson's and DC3 Dakotas. However, by 1959-60 the use of chartered cheaper flights from private operators in light aircraft became more common and the last RAAF patrol took place in 1963–64. Aerial patrols became common throughout the summer by all forest and fire agencies to supplement the fixed fire tower network.

The Western Australian Forests Department went as far as purchasing four Piper PA18 light aircraft in 1978–79 and employed their own pilots to operate reconnaissance flights in conjunction with private planes.

A major risk to all air fire operations is reduced visibility due to dust, smoke, fog and even low cloud. It was reported as early as 22 March 1945 that visibility was reduced to zero and all RAAF reconnaissance aircraft were grounded with the result that a fire near Toolangi reached a considerable size before being detected.

== Mapping ==
=== Aerial photography ===
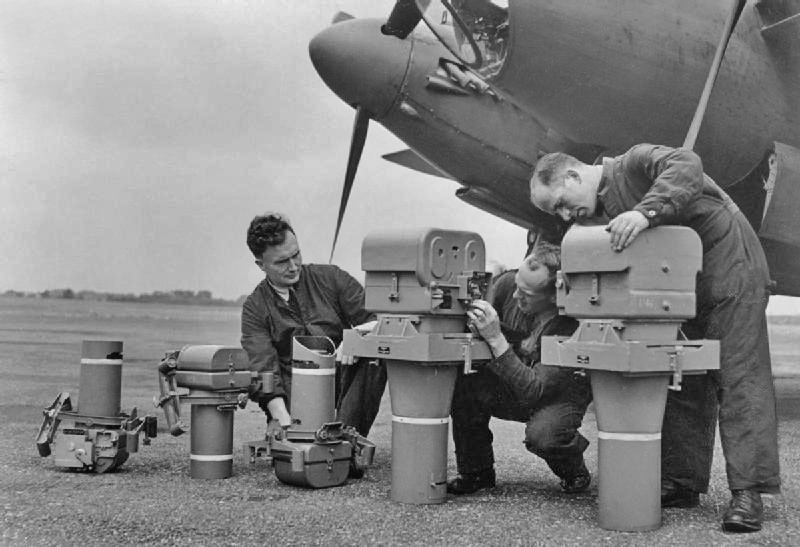
Photographers testing large format F24 cameras used in allied aircraft including the RAAF. Circa 1942/1943.

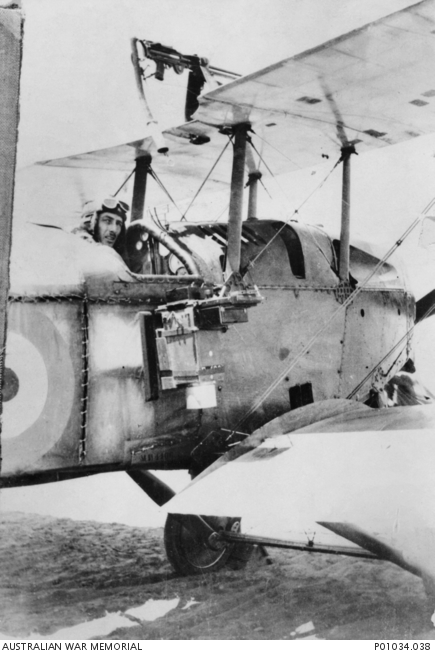
Pilots from the Australian Flying Corp pioneered the use of aerial photography and cartography in Palestine during WW1. Lieutenant Cole sitting in the cockpit a Martinsyde G 100 fitted with a Williamson Camera – 1917.

Aerial photography can be traced back to 1858 but matured during WW1 with the discovery that vertical photos taken with 60% overlap could be used to create a three-dimensional effect when viewed in a stereoscope. Aerial photography was used extensively to map the trenches of the Western Front and in January 1918, General Allenby deployed five Australian pilots from No.1 Squadron AFC on a dangerous mission to photograph 624 square miles in Palestine to update maps of the Turkish positions after the success of the Australian Light Horse at Beersheba and the retaking of the city of Jerusalem. This pioneering use of aerial reconnaissance proved a major aid for the rapidly advancing science of cartography and photogrammetry.

Owen Jones, the young Welsh Chairman of the newly formed Forests Commission Victoria had enlisted as one of Britain's original "Warbirds" in the Royal Flying Corps during WW1 and had long championed the idea of forest surveying, mapping and assessment from aerial photographs so in 1928 the Commission undertook its first major aerial photography project over 15,000 acres of forest. Later, the Tasmanian Forestry Commission undertook Australia's first large scale aerial forest survey in April 1930 when an area of nearly 900 square km (222,000 acres) was photographed in the north-western region by the Air Board. As a result of this initial work, the Commonwealth Government offered in 1933 to conduct an aerial survey of forests in Tasmania at a rate of £10 per square mile or 8 cents/ha including the production of topographic and forest maps. But it wasn't taken up. Needless to say the challenges were formidable for both fledgling forestry organisations including responsibility for vast areas of the rugged, remote country about which little was known. The composite aerial photomosaics were used to produce topographic maps and forest stand mapping.

During the war years, large areas of Victoria were photographed by RAAF aircrews and later used by various state government authorities to produce orthophoto maps. During the war there were a number of military aircraft crashes on State forests. By 1945 aerial photography of 13,000 square miles (3.4 M ha) of the forest was completed, including much of the inaccessible forest in the eastern ranges. The photographs proved invaluable for the design of new road alignments and to map new stands of timber. Accordingly, aircraft were managed within the Forests Commission by the Chief Draftsman, Mervyn Bill.

An interactive map using the 1945 RAAF photography reveals the extent of Melbourne's suburban post-war growth.

As aerial photographic cameras developed and got cheaper in the 1960s and ‘70s all forest services began purchasing their own 70 mm medium format camera equipment and modifying small civilian aircraft to undertake regular surveys collecting information on things like vegetation, logging areas, new road works and bushfire history. Photos were interpreted using stereoplotting equipment such as a Zeiss Aero Sketchmaster. Large sheets of A0 parchment, transparent overlay film, a light table, a set of Derwent coloured pencils, Rotering ink pens and a steady hand were needed for mapmaking.

=== Infra-red mapping – FLIR & Linescan ===
Monitoring fire activity through thick smoke has always been a problem for firefighters. Research over many years had been directed at Infra-Red imagery which can see through smoke (but not cloud or water vapour). Early IR Systems produced images on film in both the 3-5 micron band and 8–14 micron band.

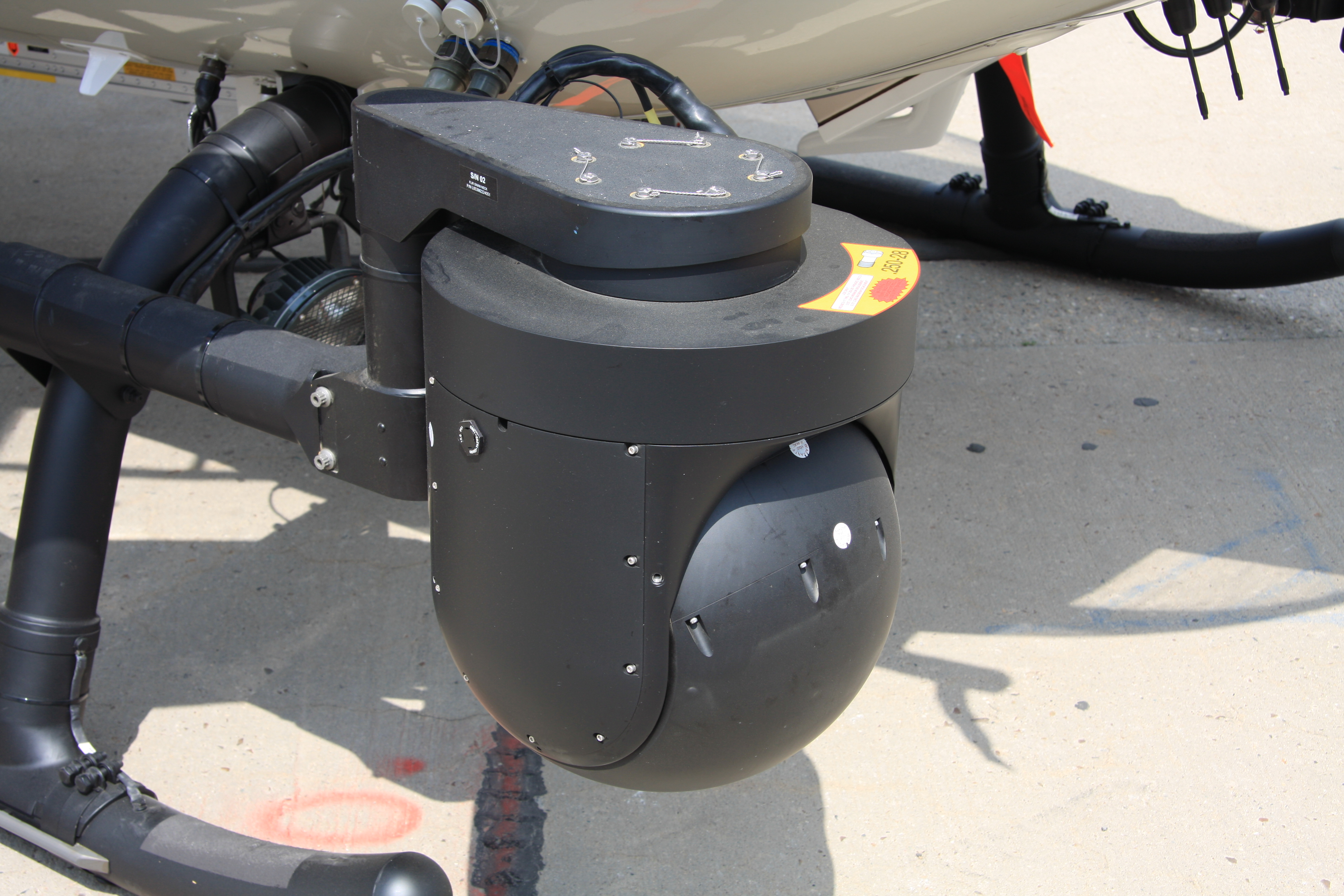
A thermographic camera on a gimbal mount

Several approaches were developed in the 1960s by the CSIRO and the Weapons Research Laboratory in conjunction with notable bushfire researcher Alan McArthur from the Commonwealth Forestry and Timber Bureau. In May 1971 the Forests Commission Victoria tested a Bendix mapper in Gippsland to delineate between burnt and unburnt forest after fuel reduction burning. The Mapper was suspended under a Cessna 182 with all the clumsy electronic equipment mounted in the back seat of the aircraft, but the results were disappointing because overnight rain had deadened the temperature difference.

The Forests Commission also trialled an infra-red Pyro-vidicon tube system in a Bell Jetranger and Piper Seneca in early 1981 and then borrowed an Inframetrics Forward Looking Infra-Red (FLIR) from the US Forest Service in late 1981 for operations from a light helicopter. In 1982-83, there was an opportunity to test a FLIR unit owned by the National Safety Council of Australia (NSCA) during the Cann River fires. The unit was mounted on a Bell Longranger helicopter which proved very useful at identifying smouldering hot spots through thick smoke and to direct ground crews during the mop-up phase. The camera was mounted on a gimbal under the front of the helicopter flying at 6000–8000 feet (but as low as 300 feet) and operated from the front seat by a navigator. FLIR operates in the 8–14 micron band with a narrow field of view and these trials were a success which prompted the Forests Commission to purchase their own Inframetrics FLIR unit in 1983 which was first used during a bushfire near Lorne shortly after.

The use of infra-red linescan technology was first trialled after the Ash Wednesday fires when the Forests Commission used the CSIRO F27 research aircraft to conduct an IR scan of the Warburton/Powelltown fire. The output was essentially IR photography and delays were experienced as the product output was developed.

Further use of IR linescan technology occurred during the Cann River fire in 1983 with the NSCA Queenair aircraft conducting IR linescan operations. However, the operational “coming of age” of this technology occurred a year later during the 1984–85 bushfire season when an infrared linescanner was mounted in a NSCA Kingair 200C and a GAF Nomad aircraft were used to monitor the spread of major fires and the progress of back burning across North Eastern Victoria. Scanning was predominantly conducted during the night and the imagery made available to the fire controller by 5 am. This enabled firefighting tactics to be developed well before the day shift crews were due to leave base camps. Black and white photographs were produced of the line scan imagery by the local chemist in Bright and were provided to ground crews departing to the fireline. Victorian forest firefighters have rarely ever had such accurate and detailed information available to them at that time of the day.

A number of remotely controlled Unmanned Aerial Vehicles (UAV), also known as drones, were hired by Emergency Management Victoria and the Department of Environment Land, Water and Planning (DELWP) in 2016 to test their effectiveness as a low cost means to gather intelligence at bushfires, planned burns and floods. Melbourne and Metropolitan Fire Brigade drones fitted with infrared cameras were used successfully at a burning peat fire at Cobden – Camperdown in April 2018 and again at a bushfire at Rosedale in January 2019 to detect hot spots during the mopping-up operation.

=== Digital fire mapping and GPS navigation ===
The geospatial revolution in bushfire mapping and navigation came of age when powerful computers and the internet converged with a number of new digital technologies including:

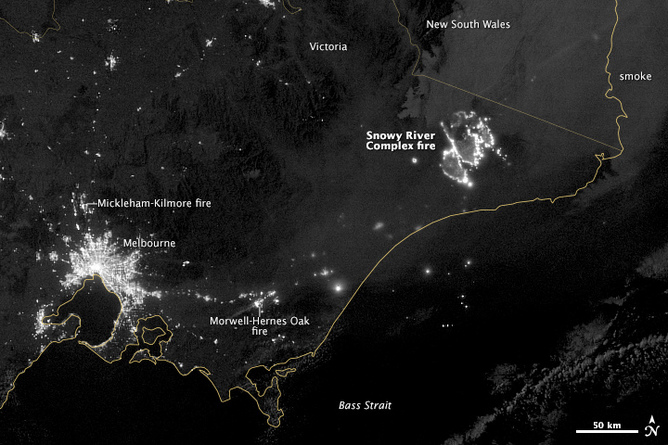
NASA image showing the Snowy River bushfire in Eastern Victoria at night in February 2014. The bushfire which lasted for 70 days grew to 165 800 ha and was roughly the same size as Melbourne. Also visible are the fires at the Hazelwood coalmine and Kilmore.

1. Satellite imagery, aerial photographs and large plotters combining with powerful analysis tools found in Geographic Information Systems (GIS) during the 1980s.
2. President Bill Clinton instructing the US military to switch off the accuracy-degrading selective availability on its Global Positioning System (GPS) on 1 May 2000 leading to satellite navigation devices becoming universally available for civilian use and making GPS an indispensable part of foresters and firefighters everyday lives.
3. Rapid advances in high resolution digital imagery and aerial cameras from about 2001 leading to the demise of photographic film.
4. Google Maps beginning as a "thought bubble" and a series of random scribbles on a white board in 2004 by Noel Gordon, one of the four men who founded the Sydney-based software company Where 2 Technologies. Google Earth developed separately in the US around the same time while Google Street View followed in 2007.
5. Smartphones in June 2007 with inbuilt digital cameras, GPS, access to the Internet and Google Maps bringing all these technologies together into a powerful single device.
6. Live steaming of digital images and weather data from observation aircraft to fire control centres over mobile phone and radio networks. Satellite imagery was useful in providing Statewide overviews in situations with multiple bushfire incidents.
7. Development of propriety and in-house bushfire mapping systems such as Fireweb in the year 2000 combining with e-map and powerful predictive tools such as Phoenix Rapidfire in about 2009.

== Firebombing ==
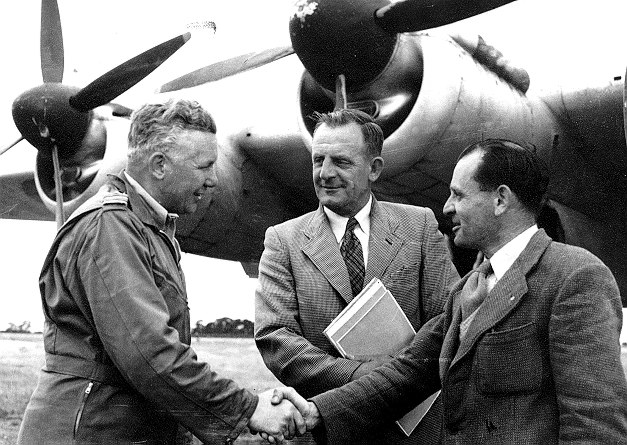
The Forests Commission Victoria developed a strong relationship with the RAAF from the 1930s through to the early 1960s. L–R – Unknown RAAF Pilot, FCV Chief Fire Officer, Ted Gill, and FCV Communications Officer, Geoff Weste at Laverton in front of an Avro Lincoln used for fire spotting – circa 1962.

Firebombing in a military sense was developed during WW2 and designed to damage a target using incendiary devices, rather than from the blast effect of large bombs. However, the term “firebombing”, although commonly used, is not an accurate description when applied to aerial firefighting although some of the early experiments included dropping “bomb like” containers from military aircraft.

The effectiveness of aerial firebombing is complex and depends on many factors including: aircraft turn-around time, distance from fire, aircraft type (fixed wing vs rotary), aircraft performance, load size, terrain, drop characteristics, drop door system, ambient weather conditions, wind, availability of ground support, fire intensity, fire size, fuel type, pilot skill and suppressant used.

Firebombing improves the chances of a first attack on a bushfire being successful by up to 50 per cent when the Fire Danger FFDI ranges from moderate to high (<24). However, the chances of success fall rapidly as the fire danger index rises, fuel loads increase and delays in reaching the fire extend. For example, the probability of success drops to less than 20% if the FFDI is severe (>50) and the delay is more 30 minutes. These figures are significantly affected by the presence or absence of ground crews.

Limitations of firebombing are often determined by:

1. the rate, at which aircraft can deliver retardant, water or foam on the fire, and
2. a threshold fire intensity above which a fire will spot across or burn through a control line.

Firebombing is not generally effective against high intensity, fast moving bushfires. The upper limit of fire intensity is estimated to be about 2,000 kW/m in eucalypt forest fuel which roughly equates to the limits which can be handled by either ground crews alone or ground crews supported by fire tankers, graders, bulldozers, etc. Severe bushfires, such as on Black Saturday, generated intensities in excess of 100,000 kW/m, whereas prescribed burns are usually less than 500 kW/m. For comparison, a large household radiator emits about 1 kW.

Firebombing fails on its own as a containment strategy if the fire behaviour includes medium or long distant spotting.

Aircraft can be very effective at slowing a fires rate of spread burning in remote locations giving more time for the arrival of ground crews. In a few cases firebombing has been sufficient to extinguish small fires such as a single trees or very small spots. Firebombing aircraft play an important role but there is no substitute for "boots-on-the-ground". However, firebombing with foam can very effective at extinguishing grass fires in open farmland, protecting houses by knocking down flames or working in conjunction with ground crews.

In March 2010, an evaluation trial for the operational use of Night Vision Goggle (NVG) for aerial incendiary operations was conducted in Victoria, the first known operation of this type in the world. The use of NVGs was extended to night firebombing using a Sikorsky S-61 in 2018 and implemented operationally for the first time at a large uncontrolled bushfire near Rosedale on 5 January 2019. Fire bombing when weather conditions are milder has significant advantages. One unique aspect of this operation was hover-filling helicopters at night rather landing them to refill which greatly reduced the turn-around times.

=== Early trials ===
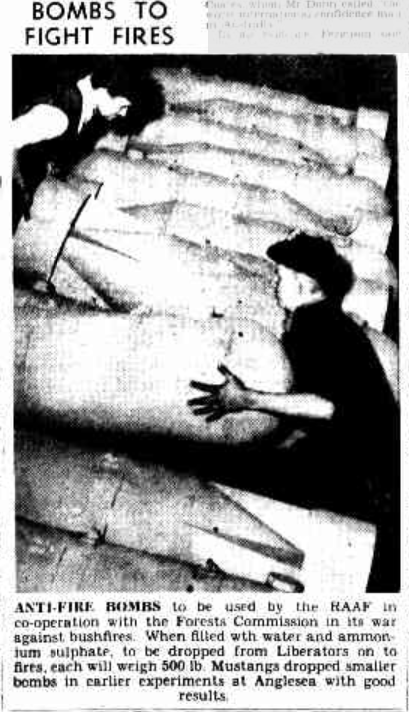
500lb bomb casings were filled with water and ammonium sulphate and dropped by RAAF aircraft during firebombing trials at Anglesea – Melbourne Herald Newspaper, Dec 1946.

The first trials of using aircraft to attack fires in Australia were conducted in Victoria in 1937–38 when the Forests Commission carried out tests in conjunction with Australian Paper Manufactures (APM) dropping brine solution (bitterns) in cartons. The chemical which is a by-product of salt manufacture was found to have a greater deadening effect on fire than water alone but was difficult to use.

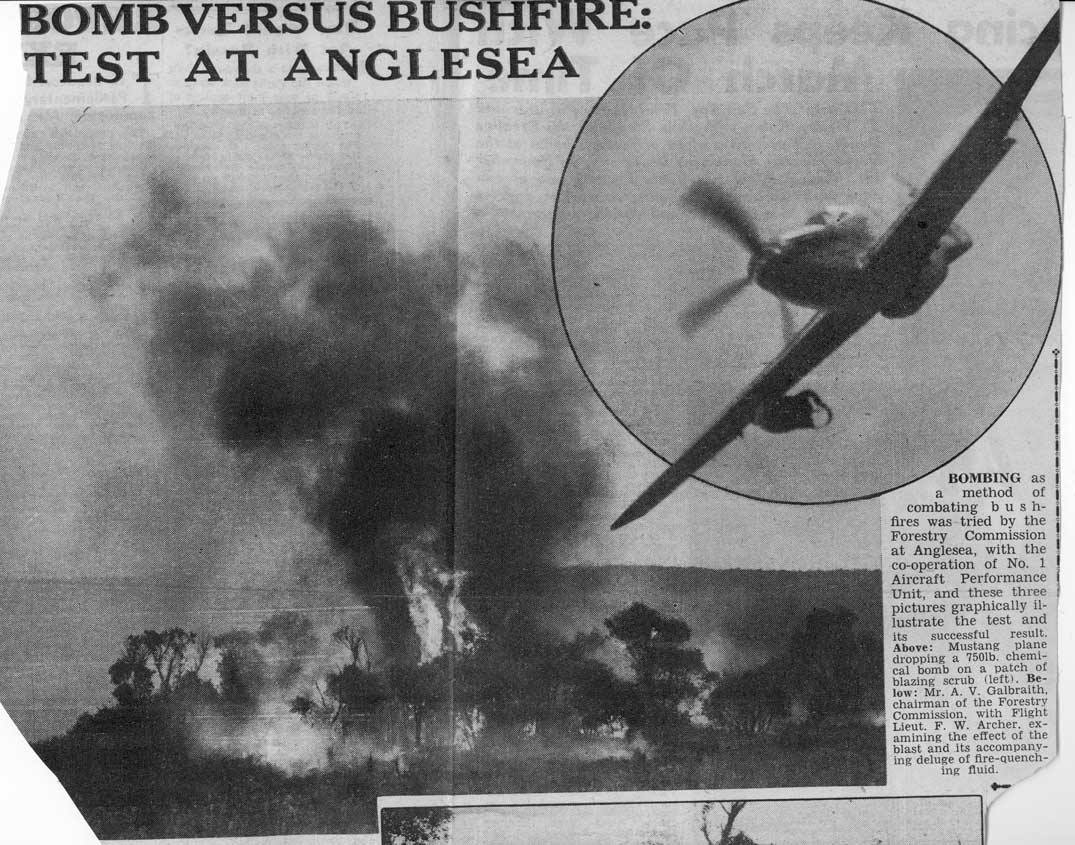
Forests Commission firebombing trials at Anglesea with a RAAF P-51 Mustang dropping a 750lb bomb – 9 November 1946

Further trials were conducted by the Forests Commission just after the end of WW2 at Anglesea in Victoria beginning in November 1946 to compare the performance of RAAF P51 Mustangs, Consolidated B-24 Liberators and Avro Lincoln Bombers dropping ammonium sulphate compounds in 500 lb bombs from about 100 feet which were designed to burst on impact. Several containers were tested on small fires for their accuracy, falling and bursting characteristics. The results were encouraging but inconclusive.

Almost a year later in 1947 American firefighters also began experimenting with water-filled bombs dropped from B-29 Superfortess and P-47 Thunderbolts. The US Forest Service had experimented before the War by kicking 5-gallon cans of water out the doors of aircraft.

In 1958, NSW fire authorities trialled a Tiger Moth crop duster to drop water on grass fires as well as sodium calcium borate on grass fires burning beneath low open scrub. The aircraft was fitted with a fiberglass hopper with a 255-litre capacity. The results were not encouraging although the NSW Fire Control Officer at the time, Harry R. Luke, commented that the technique could not be completely discounted.

After a lull, the Forests Commission Victoria resumed testing of retardants in 1963 and experimented with dropping water thickened with bentonite clay from a Ceres CA-28 aircraft. Also, on 6 April 1962 the Country Fire Authority (CFA) conducted an exercise at Wonga Park near Melbourne to test the efficiency of fire retardants from the air compared to application from a ground fire tanker. The bentonite clay was shown to hold water together into larger droplets and reduce drift improving fire retardant effects compared to water.

This trial was followed in 1965 using a Piper Pawnee to drop the new chemical retardant Phoschek provided by Monsanto. The work included lighting experimental fires and established that chemical retardant concentrations of 0.25 to 1.5 litres per square metre could be applied to ground fuel through a forest canopy and that it stopped a fire burning with an intensity of approximately 600 KW/m.

Concurrent testing of Phoschek continued over the next few years using a Snow Commander, Cessna Ag Wagon and de Havilland Beaver at Keotong in north east Victoria. The results were encouraging enough for the FCV to report in 1965-66 that “on the basis of the trials held over the last three years, a technique has been developed for firebombing with chemicals.”

=== Airfields and firebombing bases ===
The results of the preceding firebombing trials were encouraging enough for the Forests Commission Victoria to establish fully operational firebombing bases at Benambra and to construct a bush airstrip on the remote Snowy Plains in 1965-66. An earlier attempt had been made in March 1962 to build a 4000 foot long airstrip at Howitt Plains, which is a further 12 miles by road north of Snowy Plains. After some initial clearing works this site was abandoned because not only it was also above the snowline, but mainly because of the additional travel distance from the main FCV base at Heyfield. The completed Snowy Plains strip at 5300 feet is the highest airfield in Australia and provided unique access to the eastern ranges as a firebombing base. Later, in 1967-68, the Victoria Valley airstrip in the centre of Grampians was also established.

=== 1967 Benambra – an Australian milestone ===
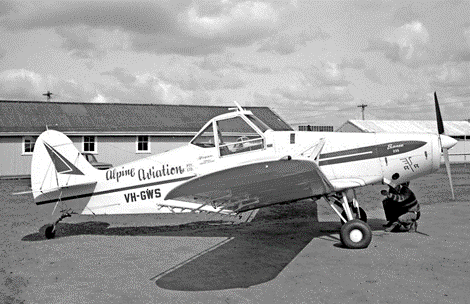
One of the Piper Pawnees that flew Australia's first operational firebombing mission from Benambra in February 1967

On 6 February 1967 two Piper Pawnees from Benambra near Omeo, flown by Ben Buckley and Bob Lansbury, made Australia's first operational drop of fire retardant slurry on a small lightning-strike. The 15 drops were able to contain the remote fire to less than one hectare long enough to enable ground crews to walk many hours across rugged terrain to reach it and make it safe.

Up to that time, there had been a range of experiments with different aircraft such as heavy military four engine bombers, single seat fighters and small agricultural aircraft with differing drop materials, techniques and equipment. But this was the first real firebombing job, and the beginning of modern aerial firefighting operations in Australia.

The "proof of concept" that resulted from the firebombing at Benambra combined with new and more powerful aircraft into the late 1960s led to improved techniques for handling, mixing, storing and loading equipment for Phoschek. By the early 1970s, the NSW Forestry Commission experimented with a new product Firetrol 931 dropped from Beaver aircraft with the principal advantage that it could be mixed virtually "in situ" inside the aircraft. The Forest Department in WA undertook trails in 1976 which among other things compared the canopy penetration and coverage of both Phoschek and Firetrol 931.

Innovations continued and on 3 March 1970, a Canadian de Havilland Twin Otter was trialled at Snowy Plains fitted with two 1100 litre membrane tanks which were slashed by a guillotine to discharged the load and control the drop pattern. Later more efficient and reliable mechanical “dump doors” were developed.

=== Fixed wing / Helicopters ===
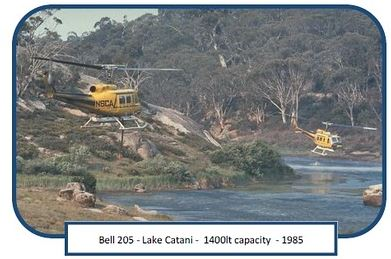
Two NSCA Bell 205's fitted with firebombing belly tanks and snorkels hovering over Lake Catani, Mt Buffalo National Park – 1985.

Modern firebombing operations generally conducted with a mixture of both fixed and rotary wing helicopters. The tactics and systems evolved rapidly and largely ran in parallel with improvement in aircraft. All forest and fire services were early adopters of new developments.

Fixed-wing aircraft must make a pass over the fire to make a drop of retardant like a bomber. Small agricultural aircraft like the Air Tractor has many advantages when the terrain and distances to the fire became critical. They can usually carry larger loads but are sometimes limited by landing grounds and mountainous terrain.

The advent of high performance turboprop engines over radial piston engines increased performance and load-carrying capacity particularly when operating in mountainous terrain in hot and high conditions when the air density begins to thin.

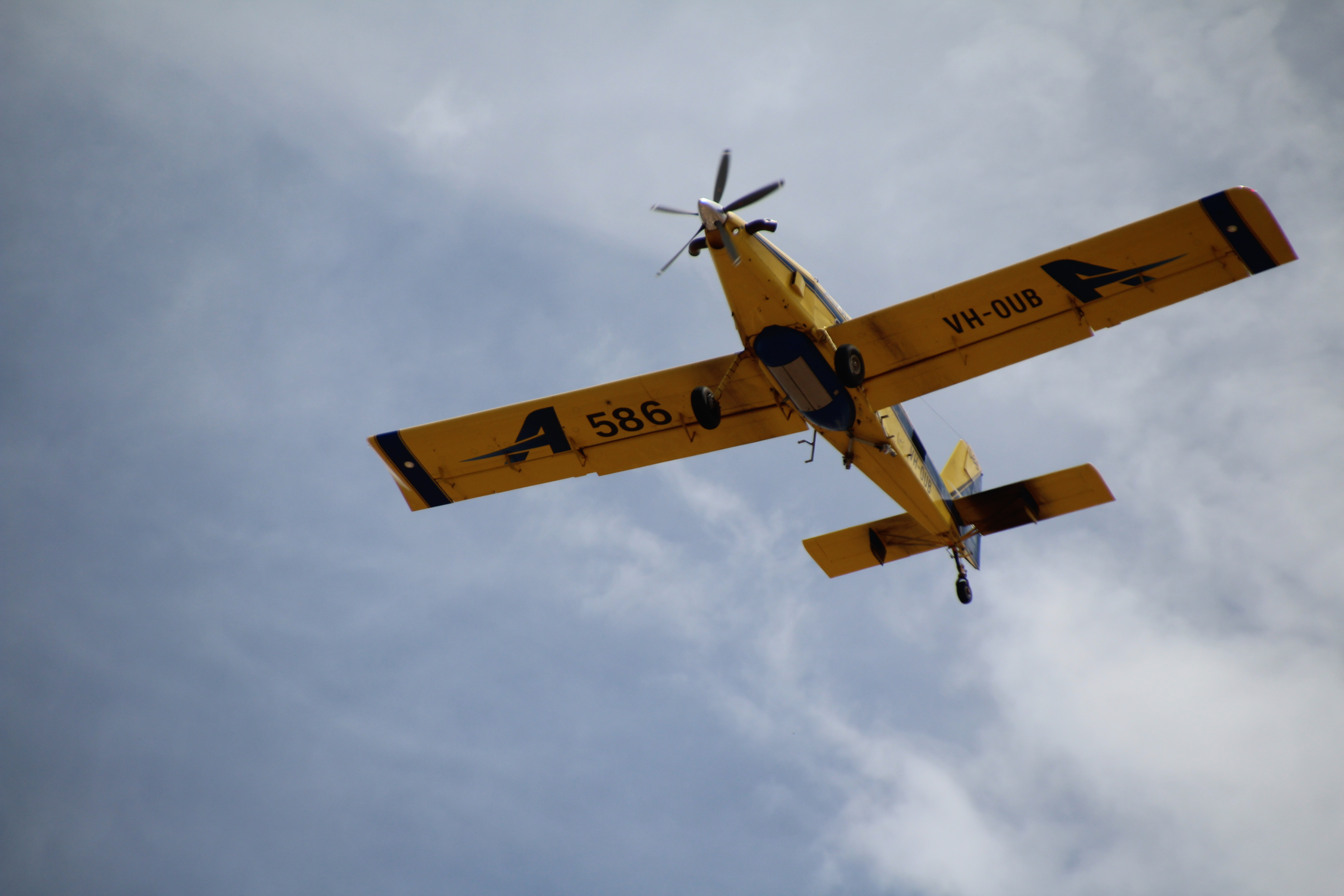
Air Tractor AT-802 water bomber

Helicopters have a major advantage of being able to hover over the fire and accurately drop water, foam or retardant. They can also pick up water from shallow dams or rivers using snorkels to fill their belly tanks or dipping a collapsible bucket suspended on a line. The first water bucket was probably developed in Nelson, British Columbia in the mid-1950s and became operational in about 1962. The bucket design was a converted 200 litre drum with a trap door in the bottom that was actuated by the pilot.

Helicopters have proved effective firebombers using water, foam, and retardants. The operating cost of medium helicopters proved higher than fixed-wing aircraft carrying similar loads but their accuracy and ability to pick up retardant close to the fire can make them more cost effective.

Medium helicopters such as the Bell 205 and Bell 212 were fitted with Canadian built belly tanks in about 1983-84 which, although had a limited water bombing capacity of about 1,400 litres, were still very effective in tight mountainous terrain providing close support for ground crews working near the fire edge. These NSCA machines were used extensively at the Mt Buffalo fires in January 1985 along with a smaller Aérospatiale SA 315B Lama with a bucket. The Helitack machines, as they were known, proved their ability to pick up from small dams, tanks or streams, and make accurate drops, particularly with short turn-around-times.

=== Water/Foam/Retardant ===
Class A Foam and Retardant are some of the various chemicals mixed with water to improve their fire suppression efficacy.

Water is efficient at extinguishing fire, and usually has the advantage of being available at little cost, but when dropped from an aircraft has big disadvantages because it breaks up in the air-stream and a significant proportion erodes into mist and either evaporates before it hits the target or falls in concentrations too light to be effective against a fire, so its extinguishing properties do not last very long. Water is only effective if dropped directly on flames.

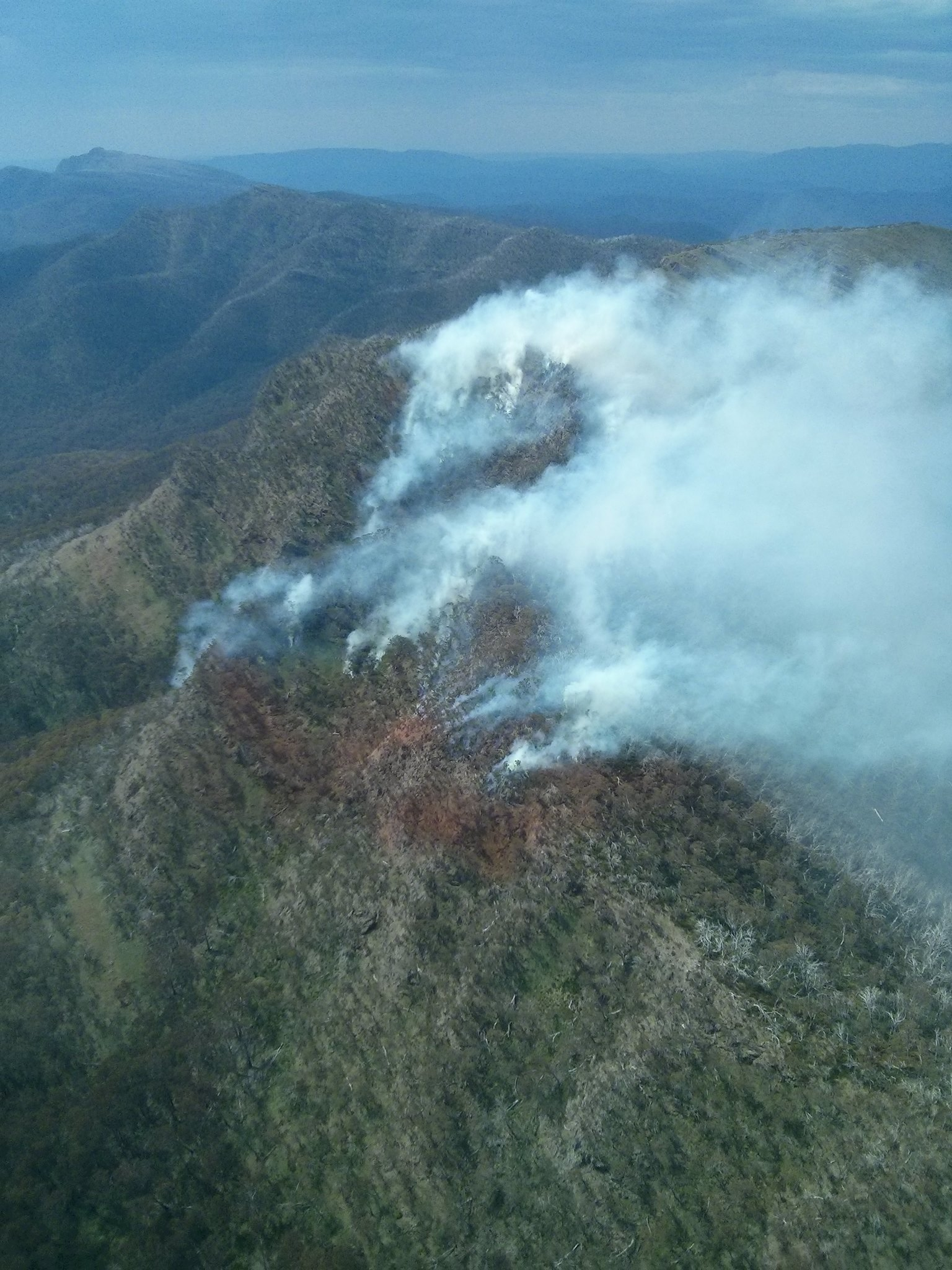
Line of phoschek retardant (shaded red) to control a fire started by lightning on the summit of Mt Buggery in the Victorian Alpine National Park. A firebombing base was established at nearby Mt Buller. December 2013.

Trials showed that only about one-third of a 420-litre load of water dropped from a Piper Pawnee reached the target in concentrations high enough to be effective. The percentage lost from bigger loads appeared to be less, probably because erosion occurs at the surface of the load and the surface area/volume ratio of the mass dropped is less for bigger loads. Early trials also demonstrated that the poor drop characteristics of water could be improved significantly by additives which increase the viscosity and hold it together as it falls from the aircraft.

Most firefighting aircraft can drop either salt or fresh water. However, for helicopters equipped with bellytanks and use hover-fill pumps, or those with buckets on ‘short’ lines, pilots prefer to use fresh water to avoid ingesting salt into the turbine engines which are susceptible to corrosion.

Class A Foam is akin to detergent. It is added or injected into the load of water in a helicopter or fixed-wing aircraft and when its dropped the shearing action as it falls through the air causes bubbles to form which improves the smothering or “knock down” effect on the flames, allowing it to be more effective and to remain on the ground for a longer period. Class A Foam is often applied directly to the fire in close support of ground crews.

Retardants are generally a slurry that contains a mixture of water and ammonium phosphate or ammonium sulphate. Sodium calcium borate was one of the earlier chemicals used in North America and then trialled in Australia. Since the mid 1950s most of the chemical retardants used for firebombing throughout the world rely on either of these chemicals to provide the fire-retardant ingredient. They also contain a thickening agent to increase viscosity and other agents to inhibit corrosion and provide colour. Unlike foam or water, retardant is laid ahead of the fire and coats the fuel and as the fire burns into the line of retardant a chemical reaction occurs that effectively slows the fire. The main advantage of retardant is that it remains effective for some time after it has been dropped. Firebreaks can be constructed using lines of retardant.

=== Modular Airborne Fire Fighting System (MAFFS) ===
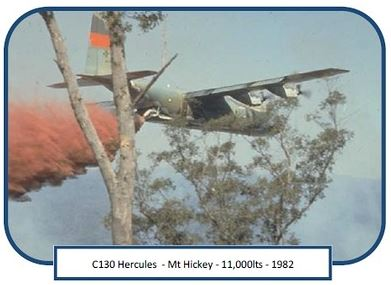
Trial of the Modular Airborne Fire Fighting System (MAFFS) – 1982

By the early 1980s, a dedicated core of aviation staff had accumulated considerable expertise at using and managing Victoria's expanding fleet of firefighting aircraft and once again led the innovation of new aerial firefighting techniques in Australia.

During the summer of 1981–82 equipment was borrowed from the United States Forest Service for evaluation under operational conditions in Victoria. The equipment known as Modular Airborne Firefighting System (MAFFS) was trialled bombing bushfires with a slurry of an Australian made chemical fire retardant (Amgard-A11) in quantities up to 11,000 litres per drop.

A C-130 Hercules was obtained from the Royal Australian Air Force for the trials. The roll on/roll off system was installed and operated by 36 Squadron from RAAF Richmond in NSW but operated from Hamilton, Mangalore and RAAF East Sale for the trial.

MAFFS could deliver a much greater volume than was possible with the smaller agricultural aircraft contracted to the Forests Commission at the time and was used effectively in the suppression of bushfires at Broadford, Bright and Orbost. Due to its low usage in 1981–82 MAFFS was again trialled in 1982–83 where it made 175 drops.

Some of the conclusion from the MAFFS trial was that while it was generally successful at integrating into FCV fire suppression organisation it did not significantly expand its aerial attack capability. Larger loads were offset by the lengthy turnaround times, canopy penetration and sometimes difficult terrain. The system was also judged expensive to operate.

For many years there had been both strong advocates and critics of using large firebombing aircraft in Australia so to settle the controversy the Prime Minister of Australia, Malcolm Fraser, in September 1980, offered to fund and sponsor further evaluation under controlled conditions in “Project Aquarius” under the direction of the CSIRO's Division of Forest Research. This time a DC6 hired from the Canadian company Conair, two medium helicopters (Bell 212, Bell 206B) and a small agricultural aircraft (Thrush Commander) were tested on deliberately lit experimental fires at Nowa Nowa in 1983–84. Aircraft performance was pitted against ground crews.

=== Large Air Tankers (LAT) and heavy lift helicopters ===
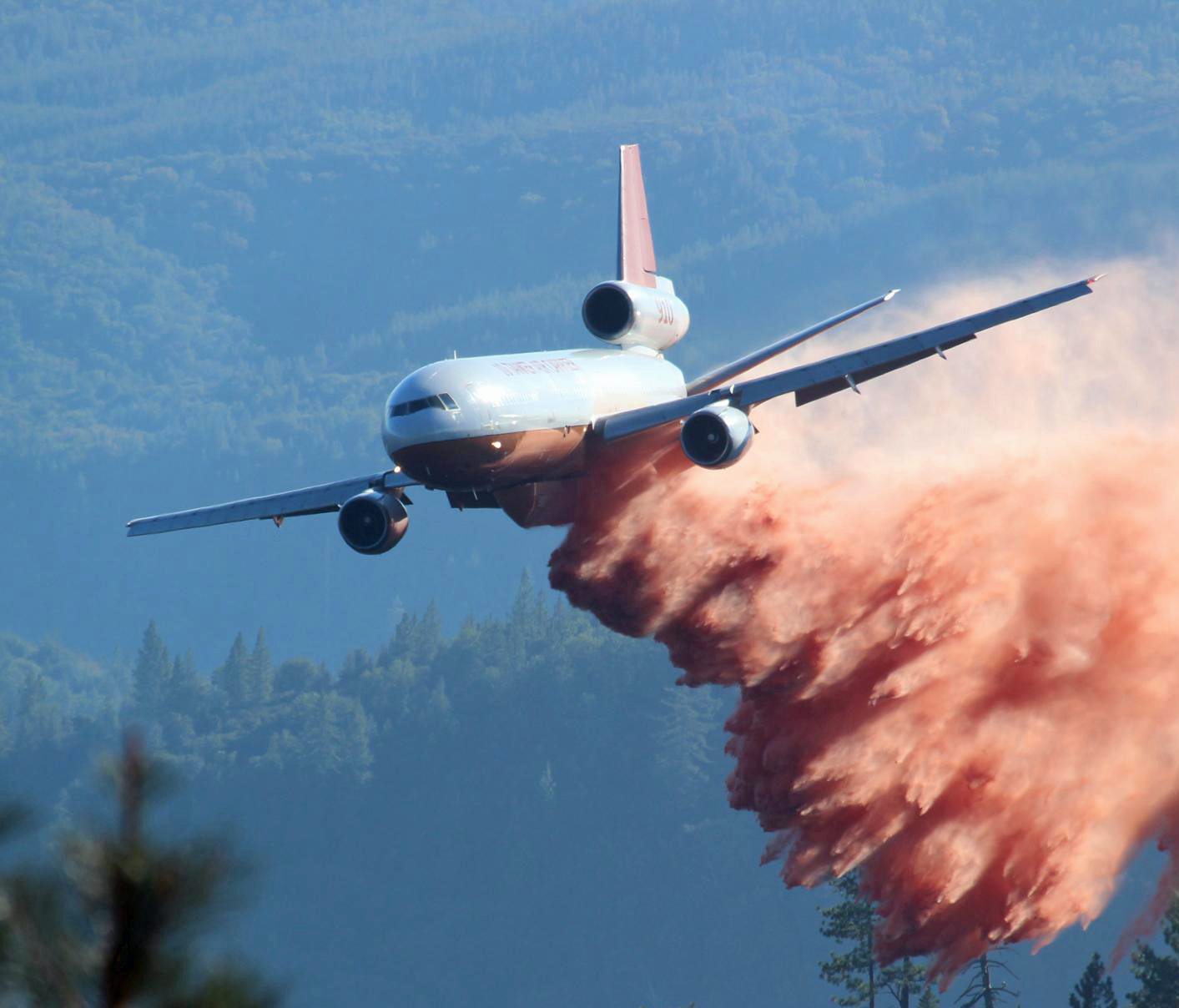
A McDonnell Douglas DC-10 drops retardant in California – August 2013. The aircraft has a 45,000 litre capacity and required 9,000 litres of fuel per hour.

Project Aquarius in conjunction with more powerful and capable aircraft with improved retardant delivery systems paved the way for modern Large Air Tankers (LAT's) such as the McDonnell Douglas DC-10 which can carry nearly 45,000 litres of retardant and are now commonly engaged in Australia each summer.

The National Safety Council of Australia (NSCA) conducted its first firebombing operations using Canadian designed helicopter bellytanks on behalf of Victorian fire agencies in 1983–84.

In 1986–87, the NSCA based at Sale in Victoria twinned with Conair Aviation to streamline the international movement of aircraft between the southern and northern hemispheres. Conair deployed a Fokker friendship F27 which could carry 6,000 litres of retardant and cruise at 230 knots. The drop pattern could be adjusted by controlling the dump doors and varied from 100 to 900 m in length.

However, it wasn't until 1996 that the Australasian Fire Authorities Council (AFAC) funded trials of the Bombardier CL-415 water scooping aircraft in Victorian Otway Ranges. Although effective, the limited number of suitable water bodies in Australia somewhat restricts their operational use.

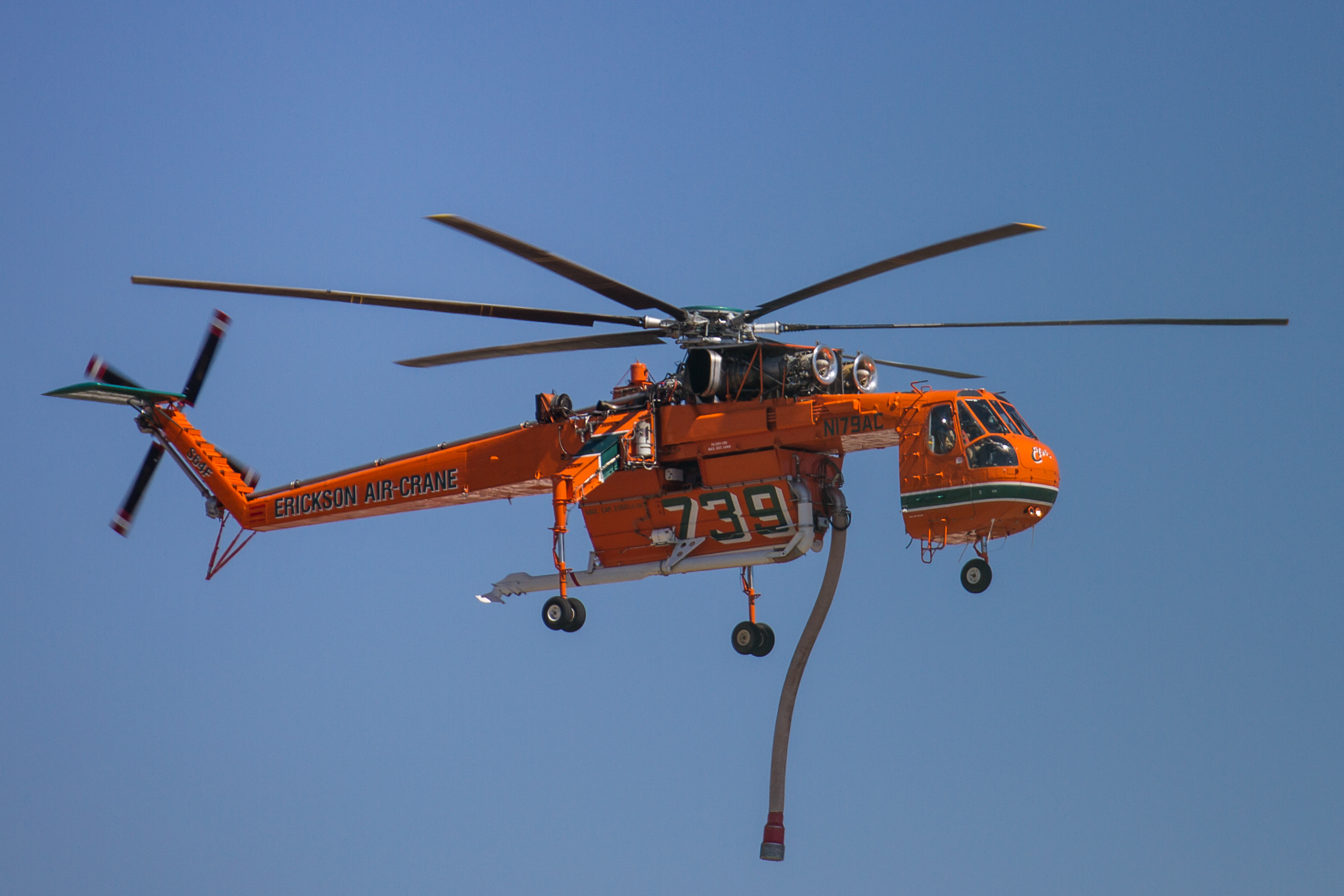
The Erickson S-64 Air Crane Helicopter could carry 9500 litres and consumed nearly 2,000 litres of fuel per hour.

But the technology of firebombing continued to improve and by 1997–98 Victoria contracted the largest contingent of aircraft for aerial firefighting to date in anticipation of a severe summer. It included 6 light helicopters, 4 medium helicopters, 10 fixed wing firebombers, 1 infra-red line scanning fixed wing aircraft and 1 light reconnaissance twin engine fixed wing aircraft.

The introduction of heavy firebombing helicopters like the Erickson S-64 Air Crane (Elvis) that could lift and carry 9500 litres of water and had a 45-second hover fill time didn't occur until 1997–98. And later in 2003–04, the National Aerial Firefighting Centre supported funding of two large firebombing helicopters, a Mil 8 and Bell 214B to support Victoria's firebombing operations. By 2010–11, Victoria contracted two Convair 580 Multi Engine Air Tankers (MEATs) for operational trials in Victoria with each aircraft capable of carrying a load of 8,000 litres.

The greater use of Large Air Tankers and heavy-lift helicopters forced major changes to fuel and retardant handling logistics. Medium helicopters like the Bell 214 require about 600 litres of fuel per hour, or three standard 200 litre drums, whereas heavy-lift helicopters like the Erickson Air Crane were fitted with massive 4,900 litre fuel tanks and consumed about 2,000 litres per hour. This led to the development of purpose-built 30,000 litre pressurised refuelling tankers and mobile hot refueling crews rather than manually handling heavy 200 litre drums. Similarly, Large Air Tankers such as the DC-10 required about 9,000 litres of fuel per hour but landed at commercial airfields with bulk refuelling facilities, but the DC-10 could carry up to 45,000 litres of retardant which led to changes in Phoschek transport, mixing, handling and storage.

Evaluations continue as the next generation of Very Large Air Tankers (VLATS) and heavy-lift helicopters become available. The largest is the 747 Supertanker with a carrying capacity of 74,000 litres.

== Aerial ignition ==
Experience and research have shown that reducing available fuel influences the rate of spread and intensity of bushfires. Other factors such as the weather, wind speed, relative humidity and temperature cannot be controlled.

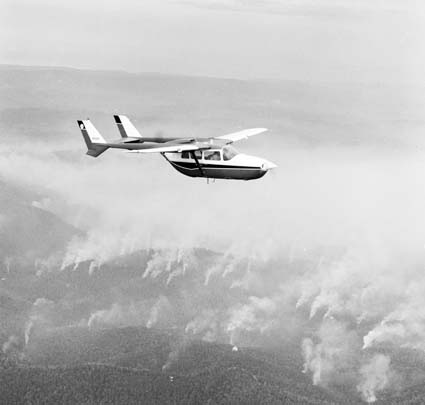
Aerial Ignition in Western Australia with a Cessna 337

From the early 1960s pioneering work by foresters in Western Australia in conjunction with Bob Vines and David Packham from the CSIRO Division of Physical Chemistry developed aerial ignition techniques to reduce fuels under mild conditions over vast areas of the relatively flat terrain of Western Australia's state forest.

A machine was designed to drop small plastic capsules of potassium permanganate crystals which were injected with ethylene glycol just before being ejected from the aircraft. A delayed chemical reaction resulting in a small fire on the ground lasted for some 30 seconds. The first trial was at Manjimup in December 1965 and later improvements followed. The spacing of the ignitions was about 200 m and could be controlled by the adjusting the speed of the aircraft to about 100 knots and adjusting the dwell between drops to one every four seconds. Great emphasis was placed on maintaining an even grid pattern but this proved a demanding task flying 400 feet above the ground and various techniques were tried.

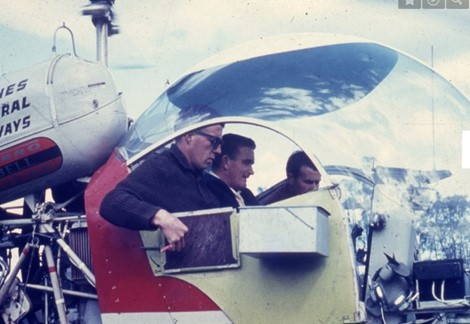
DAIDs (Delayed Action Incendiary Devices) were large double-ended matches which were struck on the side of the Bell 47G helicopter and dropped by hand – circa 1972

While the development of an aerial incendiary machine by the CSIRO was progressing the Forests Commission Victoria was developing a system for use with helicopters. The DIAD (Delayed Action Incendiary Devices) was a large double-ended match with a length of safety fuse between. Forestry Tasmania started using DIADs around the same time. They were stored in a metal box outside the helicopter along with a disposable striker patch attached to a special half-door. A navigator sat in the middle beside the pilot and the bombardier's role was to strike and then drop the lighted DIADs. After about 17 seconds the large section of the DIAD would ignite and burn for a further 40 seconds, enough to start a small spot fire on the ground. The first test was with a Bell 47G on 4 October 1967. Helicopters gave several advantages over fixed wing aircraft including flexibility and greater accuracy of placing incendiaries from a slow-moving aircraft. For larger operations in the remote mountains or desert, a helicopter would fly along ridgetops and ignite hundreds of hectares by dropping DAIDs. The fire would be allowed to trickle slowly down the north facing slopes in the evening until it went out overnight with the dew the following morning or ran into a wet gully. But the 1970s were a relatively wet decade so the gullies were damp and full of soggy tree ferns which would stop most burns. Also, there weren't many people in the bush other than loggers and cattlemen, so it was possible to do this with minimal risk. The first use, anywhere in the world, of DAIDs to backburn a large 49 800 acre fire in north eastern Victoria was undertaken by the Commission in February 1968.

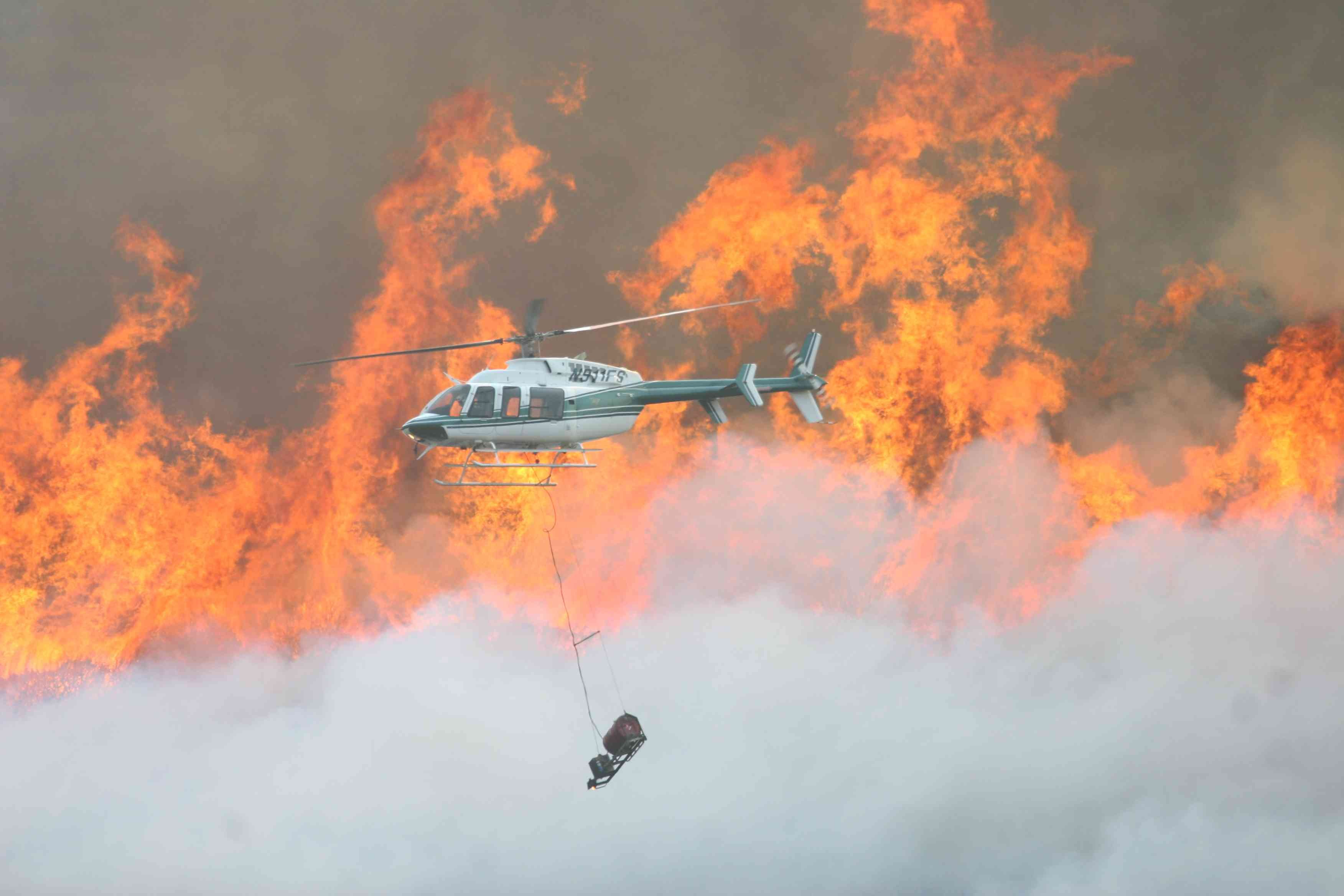
The Aerial Drip Torch (ADT) was used for slash burns after logging.

In April 1969 the Forests Commission used a CSIRO incendiary machine in a Cessna 337 to carry out fuel reduction burning at Orbost which prompted the purchase their own machine. Later in 1977, the Commission purchased a Canadian designed Premo aerial incendiary machine which dropped incendiaries in small polystyrene “ping pong” balls. The machine was certified for use by the Civil Aviation Safety Authority (CASA) in April 1978.

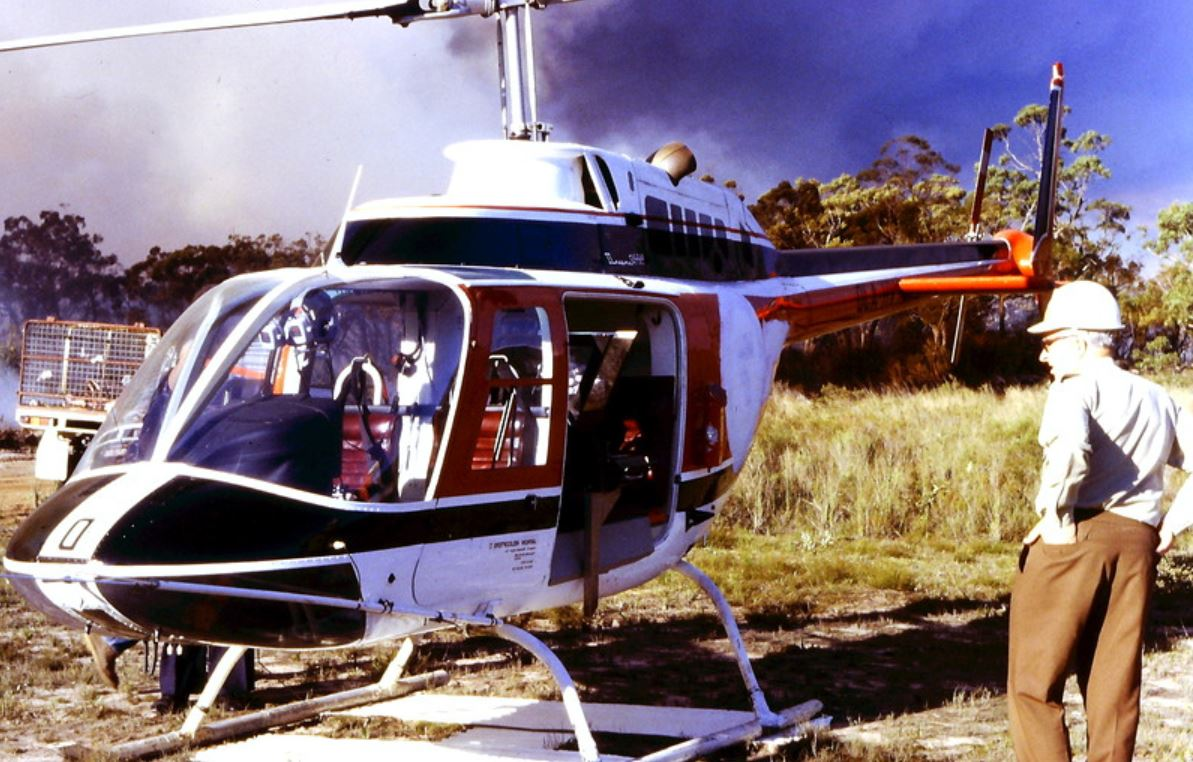
Premo "ping pong" ball aerial incendiary machine fitted into a Bell 206 Jet Ranger at the Victoria Valley, Grampians, Autumn 1980.

However, the crash of a helicopter conducting aerial ignition on 19 April 1978 with the death of two forest officers and the pilot profoundly shook the small "Fraternity of Foresters". But it led to better accident insurance for staff involved in air operations, the end of DAIDs and the wider adoption of the safer ping-pong ball aerial incendiary machine.

High intensity slash burning is usually needed to achieve satisfactory regeneration after logging and the ping-pong ball machine was not suitable for aerial ignition because a large amount of fire needs to be introduced onto the logging coupe quickly. These areas are also often in steep terrain making ground ignition by crews difficult and dangerous. An idea was conceived in Canada in the 1970s by John Muraro and the New Zealand Forest Service developed an Aerial Drip Torch (ADT) that could be slung under a helicopter in 1982. Forestry Tasmania acquired one of the machines and modified it in February 1987. Also known as a helitorch or “dragon” it consisted of a large 135 litre tank containing jellied petrol, a displacement pump, ignition system of a propane torch and burner nozzle and a fire extinguisher system. It was trialled at Swifts Creek in 1991.

Earlier in 1975, Forestry Tasmania and the Physics Department at the University of Tasmania began experiments using a weapons grade laser mounted on a Royal Australian Navy Bofors gun to ignite logging slash but had varied success at igniting canvas targets at distances between 200 m and 500 m.

== Crew and equipment transport ==
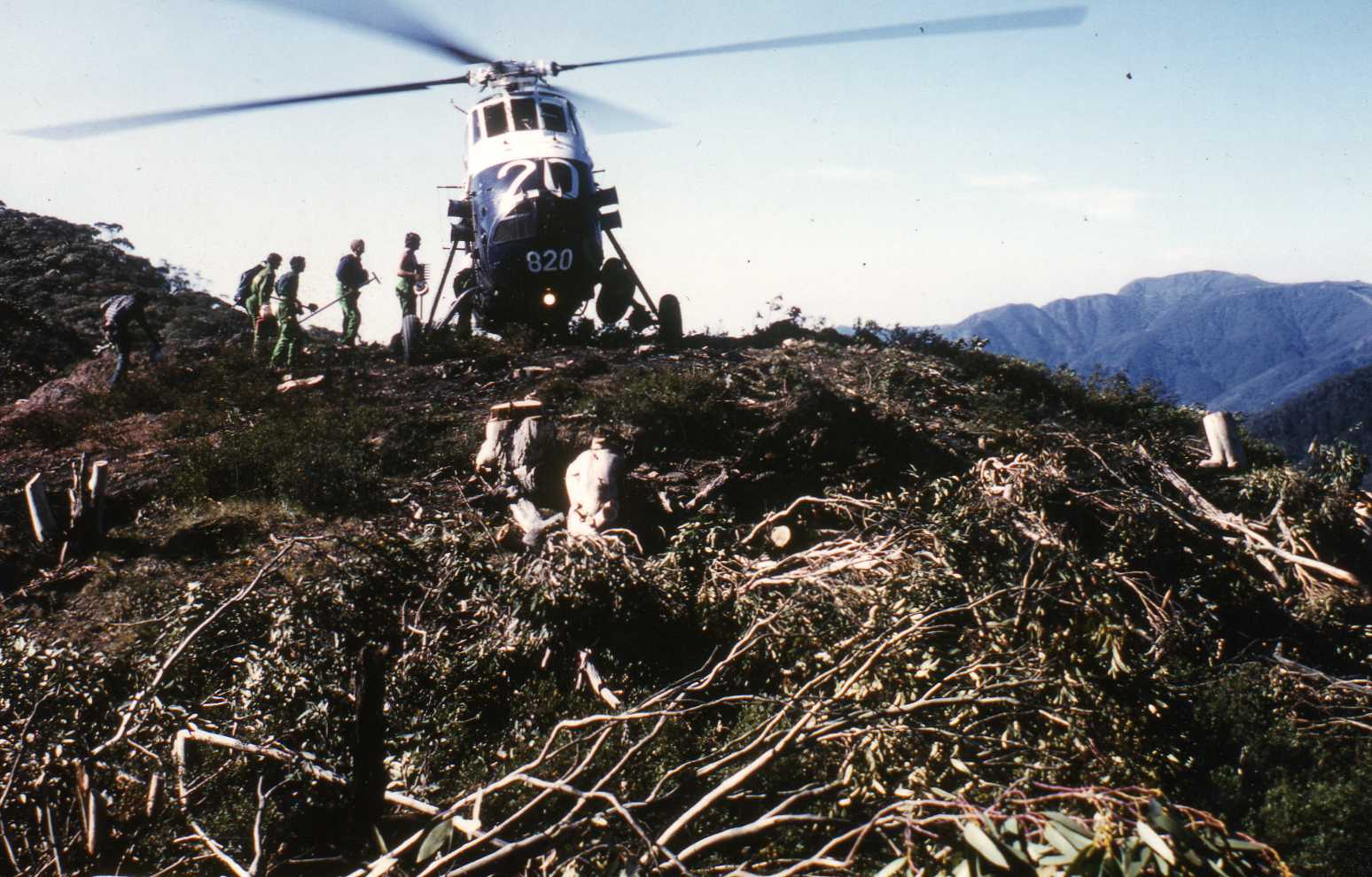
Loading crews into a Navy Wessex at Mt Murray. Mt Feathertop in the background. These fires were the largest single aerial firefighting operation up to that time and valuable lessons were learned. January 1985.

Aircraft have long been used for reconnaissance and to transport crews and equipment to fires. In 1939, the US Forest Service took delivery of a Stinson Reliant which was for used fire patrols and staff transport and helped explore using paratroopers for fire suppression.

While light helicopters like the early Bell 47G and later Bell 206 Jet Ranger were used for reconnaissance, medium helicopters such as the Bell 204 (the civilian version of the military huey) were routinely used for crew and equipment transport.

Fixed-wing charter aircraft are often used to shift fire crews and equipment longer distances within states, across the country and even from overseas giving resource flexibility for fire planners and controllers. On many occasions Incident Management Teams (IMT) have been deployed to Australia from America, Canada and New Zealand.

== Supply drop ==
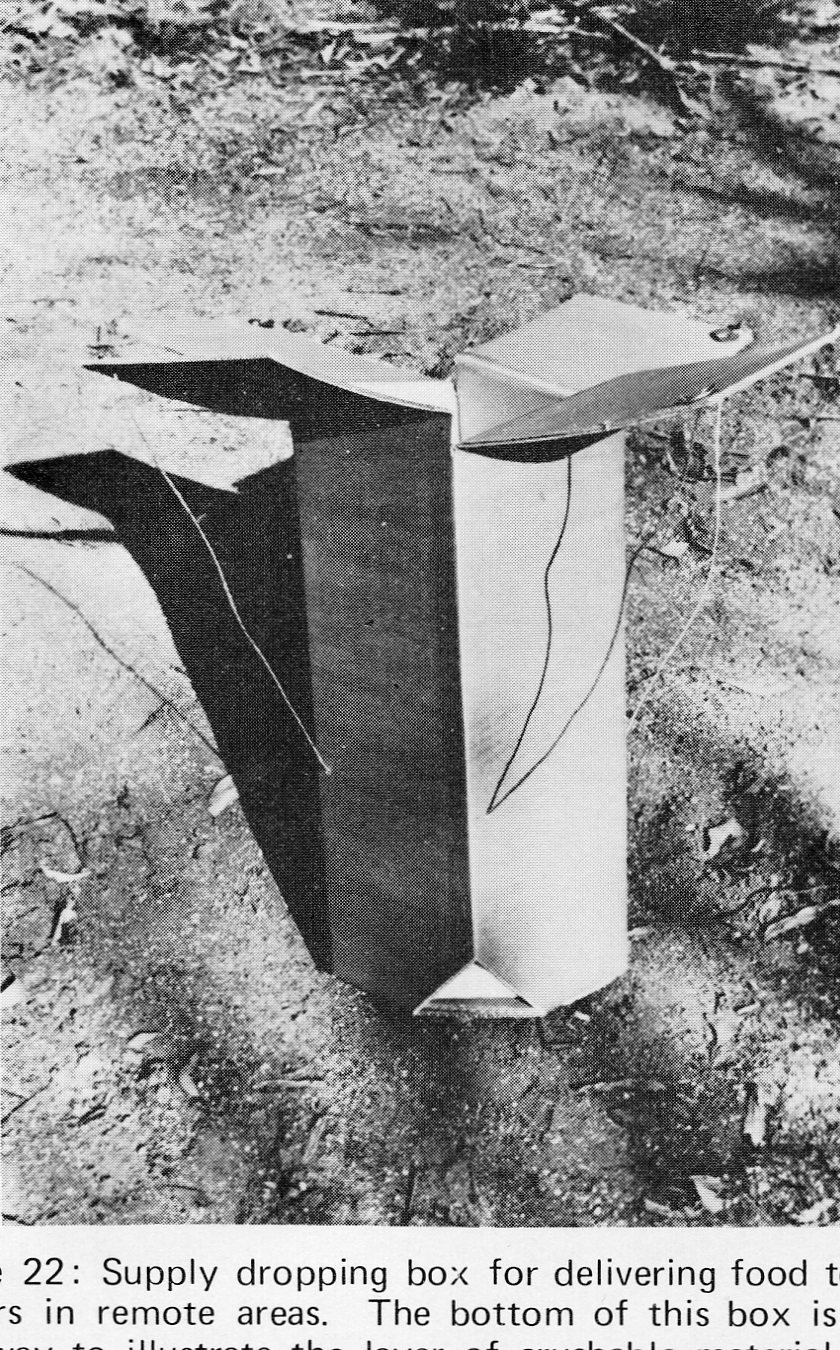
The cardboard helibox with fold-out wings was designed in 1964 to drop supplies to ground crews.

The successful dropping of supplies to remote fire crews involved a great deal of experimentation. There were obvious limitations on size, weight and “breakability” of the items to be dropped. The packaging needed to be designed to sufficiently cushion the fall to minimise damage to its contents but not too bulky or awkward to handle inside the aircraft.

The first recorded aerial drops of food supplies to an isolated firefighting crew in Victoria were in 1949 from the RAAF Sikorsky S-51 Dragonfly helicopter. This technique was considerably improved by the development of specially designed free fall containers which provide aerodynamic drag to cushion impact with the ground.

Demonstrations by the Air Dispatch Wing of the Royal Australian Army Service Corps at Puckapunyal in 1960 using small parachutes was influential and Forests Commission trials later followed in August at Tallangatta dropping foodstuffs and stores to fire crews from the air.

Risks to crews on the ground was a paramount consideration and the tests were suspended but the idea was not altogether forgotten and trials resumed in 1961 and 1963. The result was a large heavy-duty cardboard container being developed in 1964 which employed fold-out wings and was called the “helibox”. It was suitable for supplies weighing less than 9 kg and best dropped from about 300 feet and became a standard technique. The Search and Rescue Department of the Civil Aviation Authority sought the assistance of the Forests Commission in February 1972 to carry out tests at Managalore airport north of Melbourne with a Fokker Friendship F27 which led to NSW Emergency Services dropping over 3,000 heliboxes during the 1974 floods. However, greater availability of powerful and manoeuvrable helicopters in the late 1970s to transport crews and equipment soon made the cardboard helibox redundant.

Special containers and weighted canvas envelopes were developed by the Forests Commission to drop maps and line scanning imagery from fixed wing aircraft before live streaming of data became available.

Sling loads lifting small bulldozers with an NSCA Bell 205 was also trialled in about 1982.

== Rappelling ==
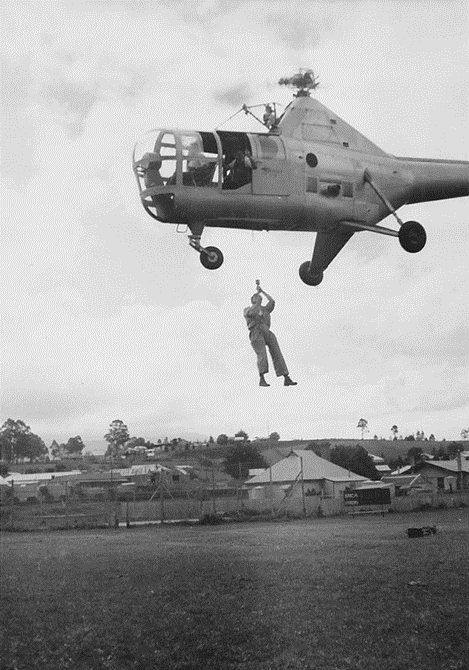
The Forests Commission pioneered the use of aircraft for firefighting and crew transport – RAAF Sikorsky S-51 Dragonfly at Erica 1949.

Getting firefighters into difficult and inaccessible terrain quickly was a perennial problem. Rappelling or lowering of firefighters from a hovering helicopter was first trialled by the Forests Commission Victoria at Erica not long after WW2 in 1949 using a RAAF Sikorsky S-51 Dragonfly which was normally based at East Sale. The Sikorsky was later used to test reconnaissance and mapping techniques and deploying of men and equipment to remote locations.

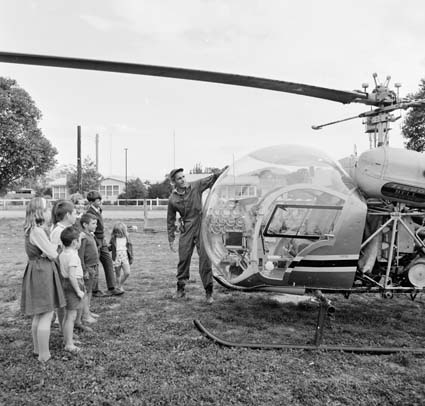
A Bell 47G helicopter was engaged on a year-round contract by the Forests Commission Victoria in 1965, in what was seen as an Australian first. This machine was stationed at Heyfield and used for rappelling operations. Here seen in front of a group of admiring school children from Swifts Creek.

The Forests Commission Victoria then contracted its own Bell 47G in 1964 and after some initial trials at Snowy Plains and Tallangatta established rappel operations based at Heyfield with a two-man crew. This proved an Australian first and remained in place for the following two fire seasons but lapsed after safety concerns from the Civil Aviation Safety Authority (CASA) about the use of the small and under powered machine.

In 1982, after nearly 18 years absence, rappelling operations recommenced in Victoria using specially equipped and trained crews, usually in multiples of 4 or 6 rappelling lowered from larger and more powerful NSCA Bell 212 and Bell 412 helicopters to attack small fires in remote locations. Rappel crews were also used to construct helipads at larger fires where there were no vehicle tracks access so other additional fire crews and supplies could be ferried in and out by helicopter.

In 1985, the newly formed Department of Conservation Forests and Lands (a sequel to the Forests Commission Victoria) commenced its own autonomous rappel program which continues today. Since 1993 an exchange program of rappellers from British Columbia has been conducted and in 2007, nine rappellers from the BC "Rapattack" program came to Victoria on deployment to assist with the Great Divide fires.

=== Smoke jumpers ===
Smoke jumping experiments with parachute drops of firefighters into remote areas were first conducted in the 1930s in America and the Soviet Union. On July 12, 1940, two US Forest Service employees claim to have made history with the first-ever parachute jump into a wildfire on the Nez Perce National Forest in Idaho.

In 1952, the Australian Army began training an airborne platoon of about 20 soldiers from the Royal Australian Regiment for deployment to bushfires and flood relief, but the idea never took hold like it did in overseas. The main reason was because of the unique shape of eucalypt trees, with their predominantly upward-facing branches and dry spikes, which are very different to softer pines, made it too dangerous. The technique was superseded by the use of helicopters.

=== Hover exit ===
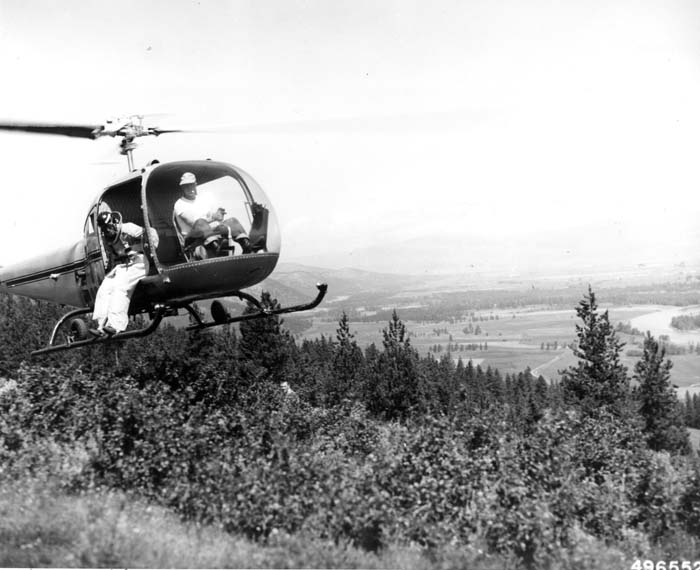
Trainee jumping from a Bell 47J helicopter in September 1958 at Lolo National Forest, Montana. Photo courtesy of the Forest History Society, Durham, N.C.

A variation for rapidly deploying fire crews was to "hover exit" or jump from a helicopter which was a technique originally developed by the US Forest Service and also in British Columbia, Canada. This technique was initially trialled at Tallangatta with the Forest Commission Victoria's contract Bell 47G in 1964. It was revisited again in 1991 to enable specialist crews to deploy from a maximum height of 1.3 m and is ideally suited where vegetation or terrain prevented a helicopter from conducting a full skid landing such as rocky areas in the Grampians and the desert scrub country in Western Victoria. Keeping the helicopter level with sudden changes in the centre of gravity was a major challenge for pilots and crews.

== Aerial seeding ==
Until about 1964 the standard silvicultural technique for achieving regeneration of harvested eucalypt forest in the mountains of Victoria largely relied on retaining seed trees on the logging coupe as the primary seed source. Seedbeds were prepared either by mechanical disturbance or a hot slash burn in autumn. This method, although satisfactory, lacked reliability and an alternative was to collect and sow seeds by hand, but in steep mountain areas, this was often slow, difficult and expensive.

In 1964 the first aerial seeding was carried out in logged areas of alpine ash using a small Cessna 180 fitted with two wing pods which each carried about 100 kg of seed. Because the seed was so fine it needed to be bulked up into a small seed ball about 2 mm across by coating with kaolin clay and using mucilage as adhesive. Sometimes small amounts of insecticide and fungicide were added to improve seed survival. This larger size pellet aided the even spreading at a rate of about 1 kg of seed per hectare. The same aircraft was used a year later in 1965 to sow river redgum.

Also, in 1965 a larger Piper Pawnee with a larger capacity of 456 kg was used to sow logging coupes on mountainous areas.

Based on earlier success an area near Bruthen was sown with the contract Bell 47G helicopter in 1967. The helicopter was considered useful for small areas in awkward locations that the cheaper fixed-wing aircraft could not easily or safely access.

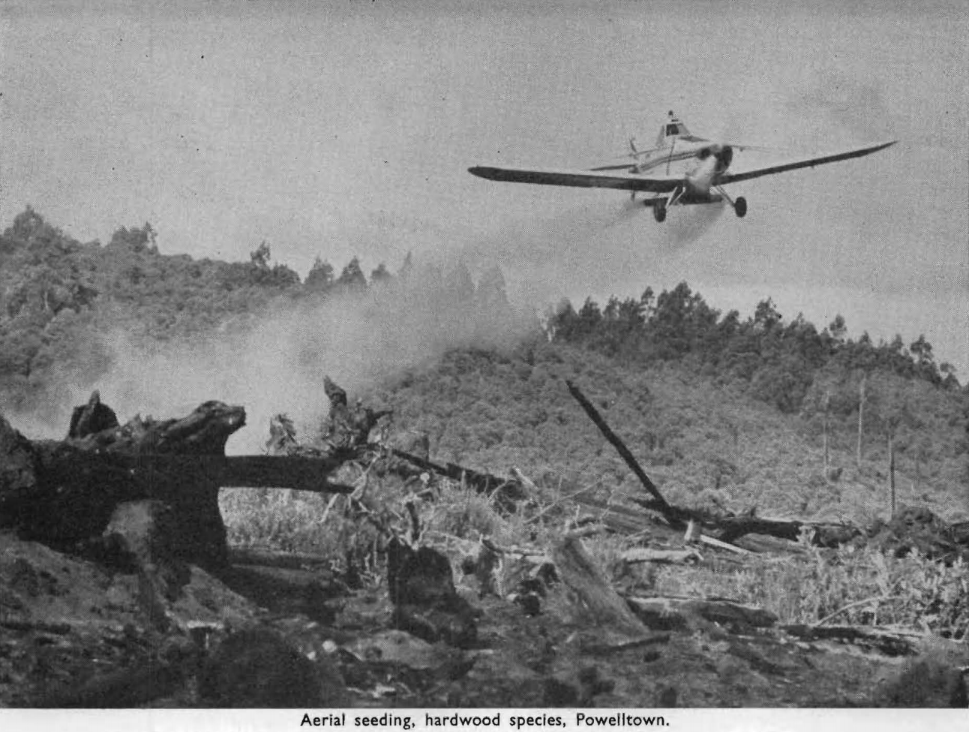
Aerial Seeding of logged areas – Powelltown 1967. Flight lines were marked by crews on the ground waving flags at each side of the coupe.

Experiments with different aircraft, seed bulking and spreading equipment continued over the next decade and aerial seeding of harvested eucalypts has now become the normal operational practice.

== Aerial application of fertiliser, herbicides, and insecticides ==
As with agricultural crops many forests respond to the application of fertiliser. Australian soils are noted for their lack of phosphorus although many trees also respond to the application of nitrogen and trace elements. Most research was focused on the establishment of exotic plantations forest rather than native forest.

As Victoria's Plantation Establishment program (PX) ramped up in the early 1960s it made sound economic sense to maximise productivity by the aerial application of fertiliser.

The techniques for the aerial application of fertilizer for other agricultural crops were well established so needed little modification for softwood plantations.

Most of the work was pioneered by South Australian Woods and Forest Department in the late 1950s using aircraft of the era such as tiger moths.

While in Victoria, following the spreading of superphosphate in forests near Mt Gambier in 1964 it was apparent that the distribution had been uneven. The problem was taken up by the CSIRO and the Aeronautical Research Laboratories in Melbourne with a view to developing improved spreading equipment for agricultural aircraft. Trials began in 1965 at Moorabbin airport and the results were encouraging.

The Forests Commission remained concerned about the uneven spread of fertiliser and its research branch continued studies in 1970-71 to examine granulated superphosphate fertiliser. The first was at Melton and the second at the Scarsdale plantations near Ballarat using a Pawnee aircraft spreading at a rate of 627 kg/ha and a speed of 90 knots over young stands pinus radiata. Based on the success of this work, spreading of fertiliser in softwood across Victoria became routine. Other States such as Queensland, New South Wales, Tasmania and Western Australia also experimented with aerial applications of fertiliser.

The main use of aerial applied herbicides has been for removal of woody weeds such as eucalypts and wattles or grasses in newly established plantations or reforestation areas. The growth of seedlings can be severely restricted by competition from weeds for moisture and nutrients. Prior to the use of herbicides, weeds were controlled by hand and often required several costly repeat operations. Aerial spraying was used to control vegetation along new firebreaks in 1946.

Experiments with the use of the herbicide 2-4-5-T began in 1966 by the Forests Commission in Britannia range near Powelltown to control wattle in eucalypt reforestation areas. The Queensland Forest service had begun earlier trials in 1957 using a Tiger moth.

Trials of a spray boom were undertaken slung under a Hughes 500 helicopter in 1975 at Myrtleford in North East Victoria. However, because of growing fears about the use of 2-4-5-T herbicide all uses was suspended in June 1978 and alternatives chemicals were examined.

Many forests and plantations are subject to attack by insect pests which can sometimes reach plague proportions and may require control measures insecticide. In rough or mountainous areas aerial application was seen as the most effective technique.

In August 1930 brown foliage began to appear in pinus radiata stands in the Yarrowee plantation south of Ballarat caused by leaf-eating case moth larvae. Calcium arsenate dust was applied using a RAAF Tiger Moth from No. 1 Squadron.

In 1962 aircraft dropped baits to control of vermin damage in pine plantations.

The phasmatid Didymuria violescens or stick insect is commonly found in the forests of south east Australia but when it reaches high numbers it can be very destructive of mountain ash and alpine ash. The insect reached plague proportions during 1952 in stands of alpine ash in the Bago State Forest in NSW and became a serious threat to valuable timber stands. A Dakota DC3 aircraft was used to spray the insect pest but was found to be unsuitable because of the long runway required and difficulty flying cumbersome aircraft in mountainous terrain. The Forestry Commission of NSW undertook more research into insecticide applications and the de Havilland corporation provided a DHC2 Beaver aircraft for more trials in 1957. The CSIRO and the NSW Forestry Commission then evaluated the effectiveness of the application and later in 1960 began using a Bristol 171 Sycamore helicopter borrowed from Ansett-ANA.

In Victoria, the State Electricity Commission also became concerned in about 1960 about phasmatid populations in the Kiewa Hydro-electric catchments in north east Victoria and began a major spraying program of maldison insecticide mixed with diesel based on the experience gained in NSW, while the Forests Commission Victoria carried out fixed-wing applications in Pinnabar. Major infestations of 1939 regrowth mountain ash were also observed in 1960 near Powelltown and an annual spraying program commenced that continued for more than a decade.

== Rain making ==
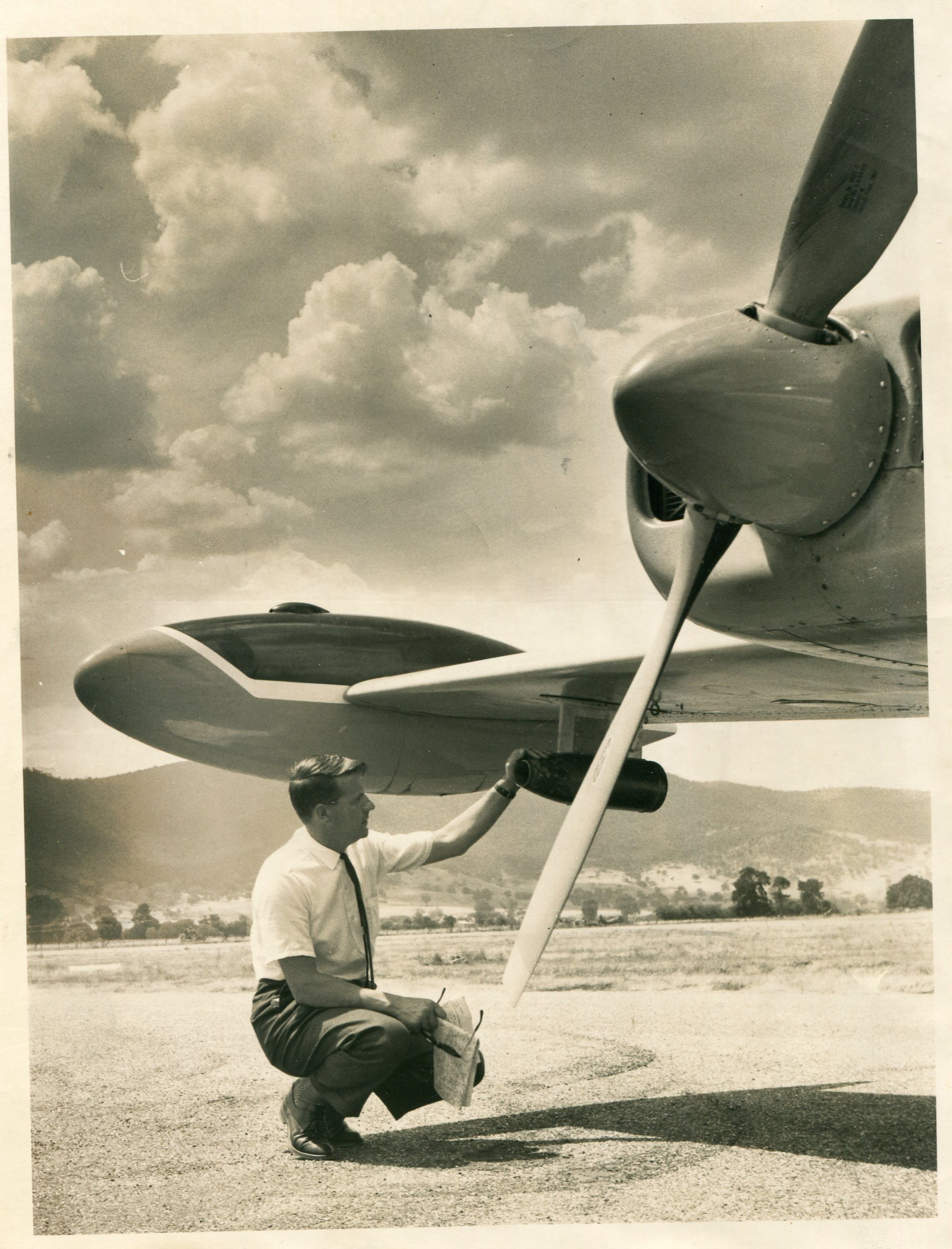
The Forests Commission Victoria contracted both the CSIRO's Cessna 411 and Bib Stillwell's Beechcraft Baron in 1966. Two years later the Melbourne & Metropolitan Board of Works took responsibility for cloud seeding over water catchment areas. Athol Hodgson at Corryong – 1966.

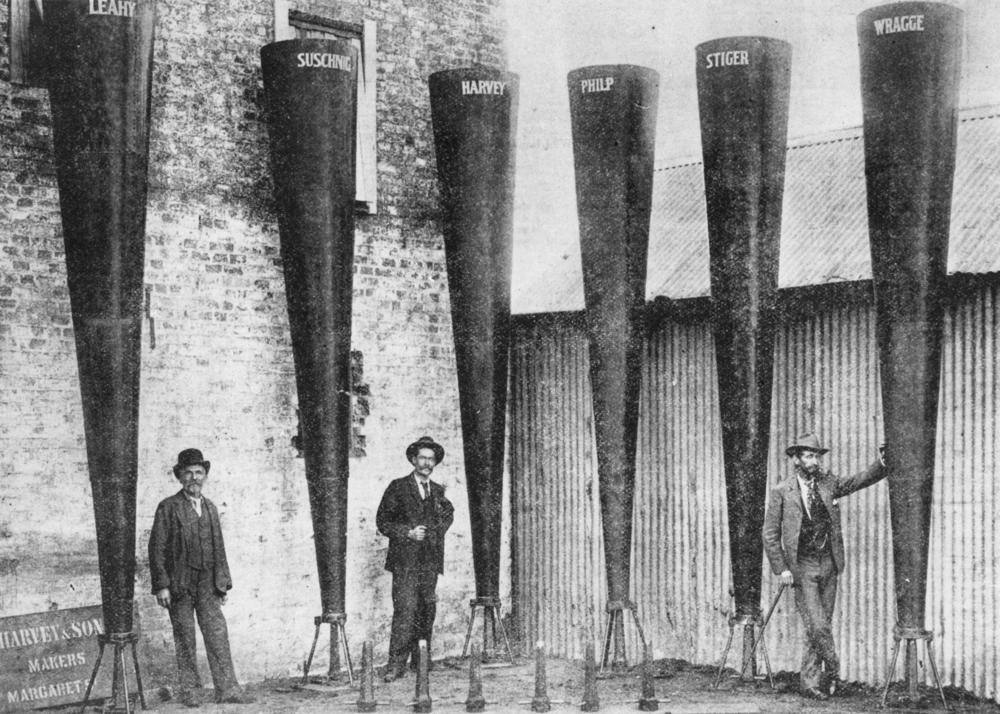
Battery of Stiger Vortex rain-making guns at Charleville, Queensland, 1902

Australia is well known for being one of the driest continents on earth, which is often beset with prolonged droughts, so any opportunity to increase rainfall was seen of great national significance and many innovative ideas were put forward. However, the results from early cloud seeding trials of dropping dry ice from a RAAF Consolidated B24 Liberator on 5 February 1947 in NSW near Sydney were particularly notable. It rained for about 3 hours producing over 12 mm uniformly distributed over an area of about 80 square km while surrounding clouds produced no rain. This is believed to be the first documented case anywhere in the world of appreciable man-made rainfall reaching the ground and the first time that dynamic cloud growth had followed seeding.

Over the next 18 years, the RAAF and CSIRO Division of Cloud Physics collaborated with state forest, fire and agricultural agencies testing different aircraft, chemicals, techniques, and delivery systems. Overall the results were mixed and most cloud seeding programs were wound up by the late 1970s. Although the Melbourne & Metropolitan Board of Works and the Tasmanian Hydro-Electric Commission continued with the aim of increasing overall rainfall across large water catchment areas through to the 1990s.

== Escalation in the use of aircraft and lessons learned ==
The Forests Commission Victoria began aerial photography in 1928. The commission performed fire reconnaissance in RAAF Westland Wapitis in February 1930, contracted a Bell 47G in 1964, and then successfully proved fire bombing at Benambra in 1967, Australia now has a large fleet of firefighting and forestry aircraft with support staff available each summer.

The many trials, collaboration and research, together with technological advances in fixed and rotary-wing aircraft, led to widespread adoption of aircraft by foresters and firefighters particularly when it was demonstrated that firebombing could improve the chances of a first attack on a bushfire being successful by up to 50 per cent, when the Fire Danger FFDI is low to moderate. Aerial ignition, crew transport and rappelling also proved successful.

The summer of 1977-78 was characterised by a build-up of extreme fire danger in most areas of southern Australia. There were 606 outbreaks of fire in Victoria, of which 77 occurred over a period of three days from 15 to 17 January. Lightning caused most of these in the alpine areas of the State. Many were controlled quickly but eight developed into major fires and stage 2 of the State Disaster Plan was enacted. Then the Army and Airforce were called to assist 850 Forests Commission staff and employees. A notable feature was the very important part played by military helicopters such as the Bell 204 Huey in moving crews and supplies. This was probably the first time large military helicopters had been used to support Australian firefighters on such a scale. Five small firebombers also dropped over 100,000 litres of retardant, 8 smaller helicopters and a number of light fixed wing aircraft were deployed. The cost of fire suppression for the year 1977-78 was an unprecedented $3.3 million.

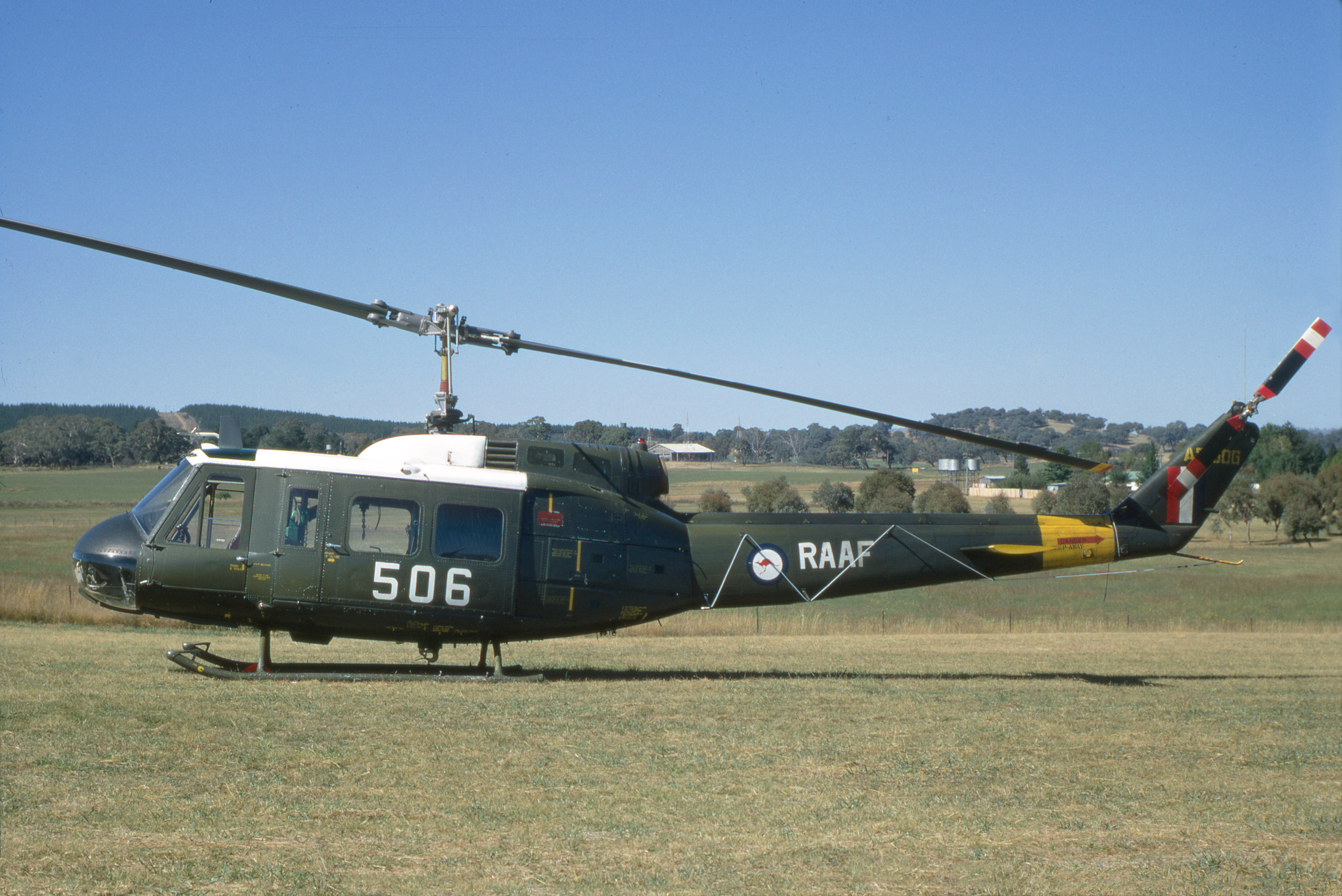
RAAF Iroquois helicopters were deployed to Victorian bushfires in January 1978. This was probably the first time large military helicopters had been used to support Australian firefighters on such a scale. They were invaluable at moving fire crews and equipment into the remote mountains.

The Ash Wednesday bushfires occurred in south-eastern Australia on 16 February 1983. Over its twelve-hour rampage, more than 180 fires fanned by winds of up to 110 km/h caused widespread destruction across Victoria and South Australia. Years of severe drought and extreme weather combined to create one of Australia's worst fire days since Black Friday in 1939. In Victoria, 47 people died, while in South Australia there were a further 28 deaths. Over 16,000 firefighters combatted the blazes and a variety of equipment was used, including 400 vehicles (fire-trucks, water tankers and dozers) and 40 aircraft including 11 RAAF Iroquois and commercial helicopters. The Prime Minister Malcolm Fraser then directed the RAAF to supply a CH47 Chinook to support remote firefighting operations on Mount Buffalo transporting large quantities of personnel and cargo onto the plateau. Forests Commission annual expenditure on fire suppression for 1982-83 rose to $16.8 million.

The pattern was repeated in the summer of 1984-85 with the largest single aerial firefighting operation in Australia up to that time. Lightning strikes started fires in north eastern Victoria which were in remote, inaccessible mountain country where firefighting was difficult, hazardous and slow. One hundred and eleven fires started on the afternoon on 14 January 1985 and burnt more than 150,000 ha with a perimeter in excess of 1,000 km before they were brought under control after about two weeks. About one-third of the perimeter had to be established and held in steep mountain country where there was no conventional vehicle access. At the peak of the campaign more than 3,000 people were directly deployed on fire fronts or in close support, including 2,000 from the Department of Conservation Forests and Lands (CFL), 500 CFA volunteers, 449 Armed Services personnel, 120 sawmill employees and 50 State Electricity Commission employees. Major equipment used included 75 bulldozers, 400 tankers, 20 helicopters and 16 fixed-wing aircraft. Navy Wessex and Bell UH-1 Iroquois helicopters were used to lift crews and equipment while smaller Bell Kiowa reconnaissance helicopters were also effectively deployed. NSCA helicopter bellytanks more than proved their worth. Expenditure for the year was $10.5 million. The tempo, size and severity of bushfire incidents in southern Australia intensified throughout the 1990s and into 2002-03, 2006-07, Black Saturday in 2009 and 2013-14, each which involved ever-larger numbers of aircraft. For example, the 2006-07 Great Divide Complex Fires in Victoria was referred to by some commentators as a "mega fire" with the campaign lasting for nearly 3 months burning over one million hectares. A total of 8200 hours were flown with between 55-65 aircraft engaged at any one time and an additional 200 were on call. The highest ever number of individual aircraft sorties were recorded.

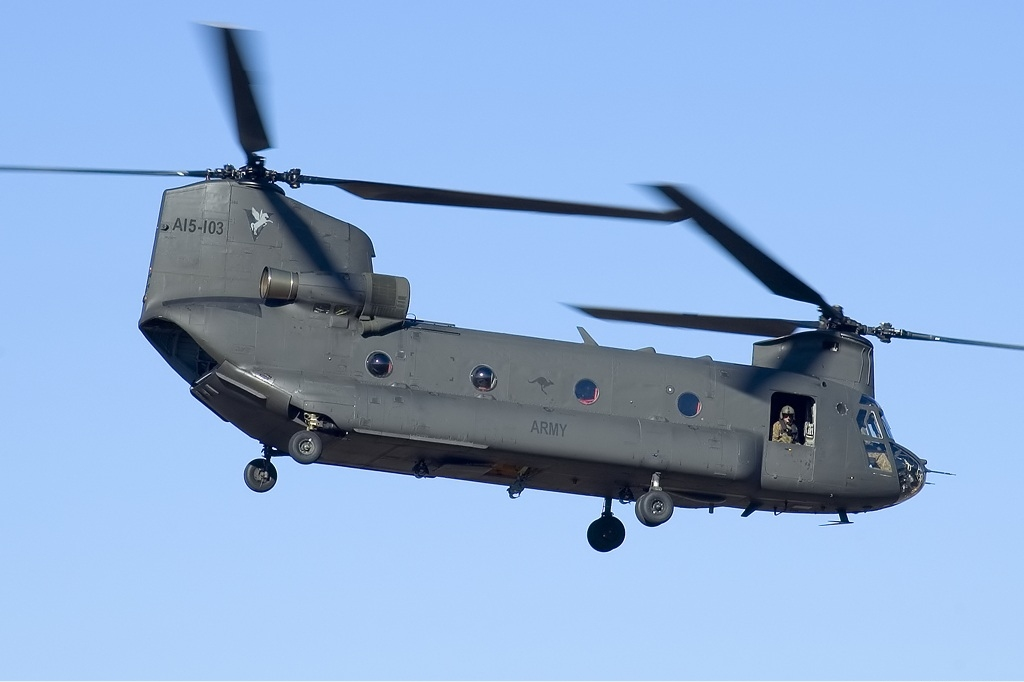
The Prime Minister, Malcolm Fraser made a RAAF CH-47 Chinook helicopter available to firefighters at Mt Buffalo in the wake of the Ash Wednesday bushfires in Victoria in 1983.

All States of Australia now rely heavily on expensive firefighting aircraft. After Black Saturday in 2009 it was reported to the Royal Commission that the Sikorsky S-64 (Elvis) air crane cost A$20,000 a day to keep on standby plus an additional $11,000 a day to operate. Fuel was a further significant cost with the aircraft consuming about 2,000 litres per hour. Whereas, smaller reconnaissance helicopters such as Eurocopter AS350 Écureuil proved cheaper, costing about $1,500 per day on standby and $1,000 more to operate. The overall cost of having a fleet on stand-by for the 2008-09 financial year in Victoria was $18 million, plus an additional $16 million in operating charges. In NSW, an additional A$38 million was set aside in 2017 by the Rural Fire Service for two new Large Air Tankers (LAT), DC-10 and Lockheed L100, to supplement their existing aircraft fleet including two ex-Army Blackhawks.

A similar situation existed in America in 2003 where the US Forest Service and Bureau of Land Management reported to a senate committee that together they own, lease, or contract over 1,000 aircraft each fire season and spend in excess of US$250 million. This prompted the US Forest Service to review its aging large firebombing fleet. However, with increasing use of LATs and heavy-lift helicopters such as the Sikorsky Air Crane fire authorities expected to see these figures rise. For example, in 2012, the US Forest Service contracted a DC-10 with daily standing charge of about US$50,000 plus an hourly flight rate of about US$22,000. Costs for retardant (about US$1/litre), fuel, ground support staff are generally additional.

There is ample evidence and general consensus amongst firefighters about the effectiveness of deploying aircraft for aggressive initial attack to keep fires small or to provide tactical air support for fire crews on the ground. In California, the US Forest Service has an annual expenditure of about US$200 million to suppress 98% of wildfires and up to US$1 billion to suppress the other 2% of fires where initial attack fails and they become large.

However, rising costs of large firebombing aircraft have led some critics to question the strategy of relying on them for prolonged attack operations on relatively stationary fire fronts or for building lengthy retardant control lines.

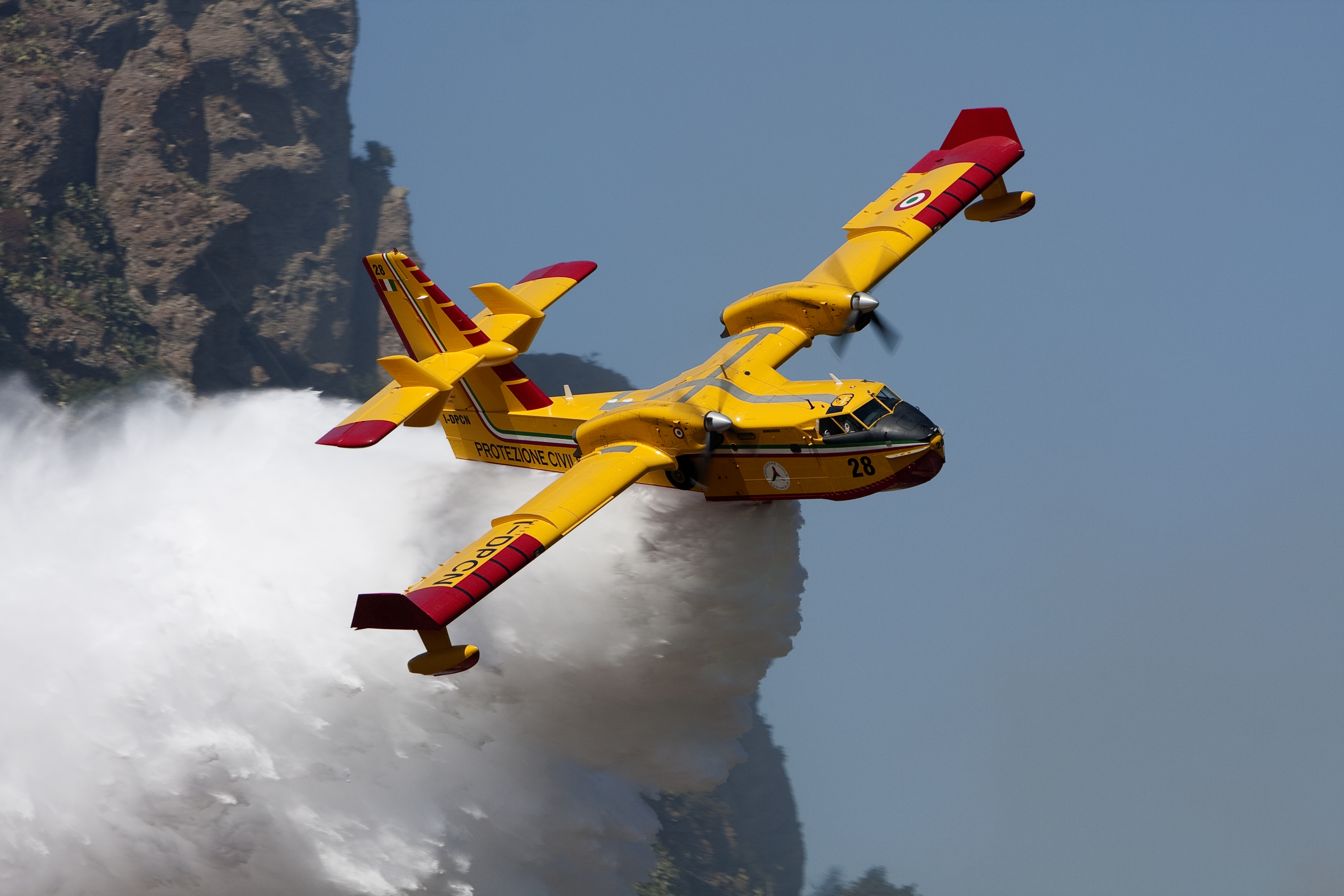
There are often calls in the media for Australia to use water scooping aircraft like the Bombardier CL-415. The Australasian Fire Authorities Council (AFAC) funded trials in the Otways in 1996. It was found that the aircraft requires over 1.3 km of open water, at least 2m deep, with clear entry and exits and unlike Canada, there are a limited number of suitable water bodies in Australia. Although a smaller AT-802F with amphibious floats capable of carrying 3000 litres became available in 2016.

Whereas, in response to global warming and the threat of increased bushfires, the Australian Greens have outlined a policy for the Australian Defence Force to establish a "wilderness firefighting unit" by purchasing three Bombardier 415 water bombers for about A$150 million to be flown and serviced by Air Force and Army personnel.

Some are even calling for military aircraft to drop sonic bombs to "snuff out" bushfires in the way you blow out birthday candles.

=== Air Attack Supervision (AAS) ===
Aircraft provide the ideal platform for many tasks including reconnaissance, mapping, air observing, rappelling and some specialised roles developed as aircraft became more common in bushfires. Thankfully, accidents and incidents reported to the Civil Aviation Safety Authority have been few.

Valuable lessons about using aircraft, particularly after the 1985 alpine bushfires at Mt Buffalo, led to new training programs and safety manuals for air observers, incendiary operators, hot refueling crews, rappellers, retardant mixers as well as specialist Air Attack Supervisors (AAS) to more efficiently manage and utilise aircraft resources.

The AAS has responsibility for directing complex aerial firebombing, setting priorities and communicating with all aircraft and with fire crews on the ground. It requires judgement to ensure the firebombing remains safe and effective. They operate in separate aircraft and orbit the fire at a higher altitude. High wing aircraft such as the Cessna 182 or light helicopters such as the Eurocopter AS350 Écureuil are common AAS platforms.

== National Aerial Firefighting Centre (NAFC) ==
While the responsibility for bushfire suppression, and therefore aircraft use, rests with the Governments of each of the Australian States and Territories, the National Aerial Firefighting Centre (NAFC) was formed in July 2003 to coordinate national arrangements for contacting and sharing valuable firefighting aircraft. The national fleet comprises approximately 130 contracted fixed-wing, helicopters and Large Air Tankers (LAT) which supplements many state-owned, and state-contracted aircraft to meet peak demand across Australia making up more than 500 aircraft, provided by over 150 operators. In 2015–16, aircraft from the national fleet were activated 5,000 times and made nearly 30,000 firebombing drops.

Reciprocal arrangements are in place between all Australian States and many overseas countries to share aircraft and specialist expertise like Air Attack Supervisors so some common international aviation guidelines with standard terminology are being developed to facilitate global deployments. Many large aircraft and aircrews rotate between the northern and southern hemispheres.

== See also ==
- Forests Commission Victoria
- Aerial firefighting
- Wildfire suppression
- Glossary of wildfire terms
- Unmanned aerial vehicle
- Emergency Management Victoria
