= Elvis (helicopter) =

Nickname of an Erickson S-64 Air-Crane Helitanker

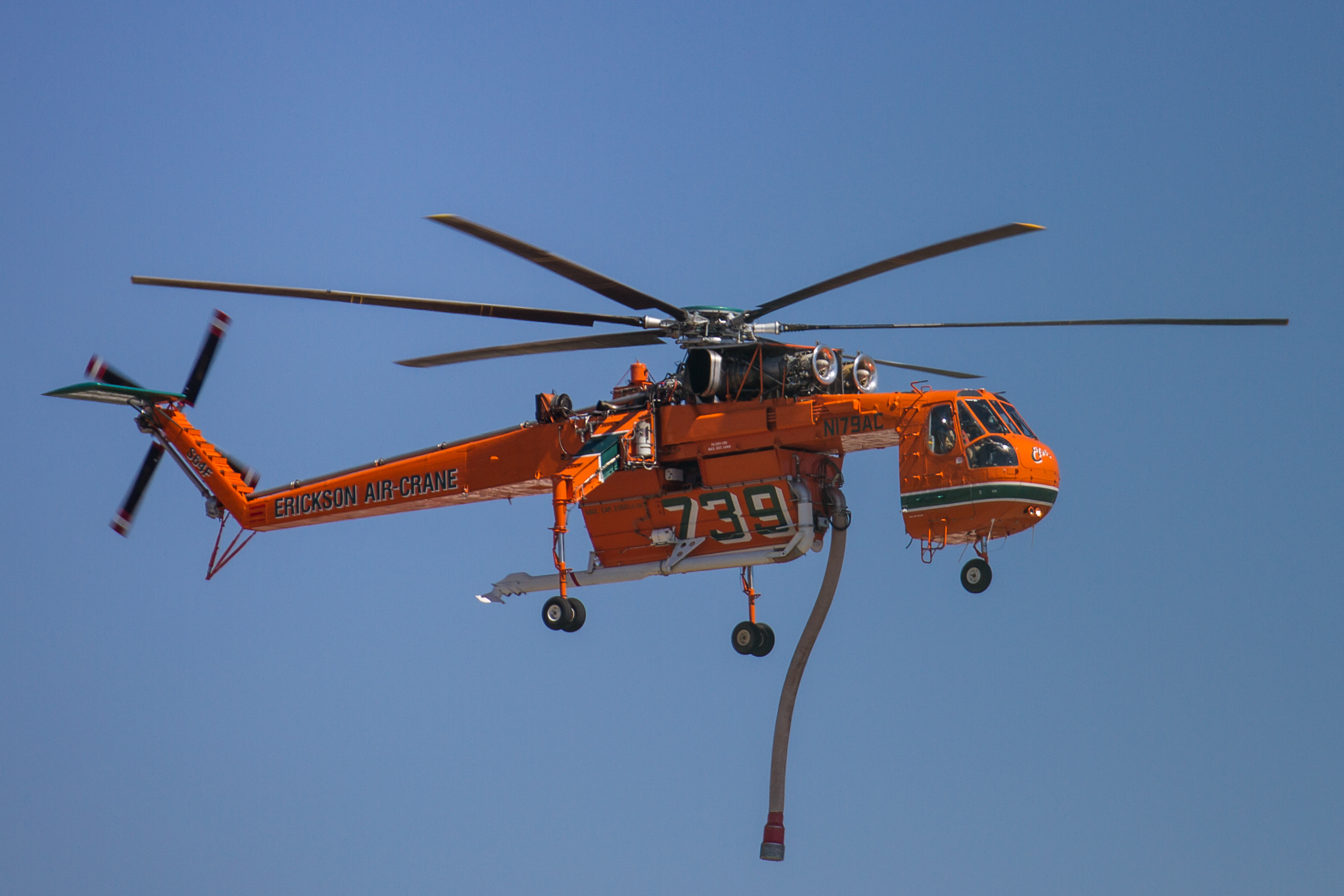
- N179AC, known as Elvis

General information
- Type: Erickson S-64F Air-Crane
- Manufacturer: Sikorsky Aircraft Corporation, / Erickson Air-Crane
- Owners: Erickson Air-Crane
- Registration: N179AC

History
- Fate: Still operational

Elvis is the nickname of Erickson S-64 Air-Crane, tail number OB-2081-P (N179AC), which has gained fame in Australia as a highly visible and valuable tool in bushfire suppression. The helicopter, which can hold 9,500 litres (2,500 US gal) of water or foam mix, has been brought out by the Victorian Government from the United States for each fire season since 2001-2002. The aircraft obtained its nickname due to the time that it spent working for the United States National Guard in Memphis, where singer Elvis Presley lived for most of his life.

Erickson Air-Crane helitankers were first brought out to Victoria in December 1997. The first one, dubbed by locals as "Eric the Water Bomber" (N223AC), was used to fight a fire in Frankston and the Caledonia fire in the Alpine National Park, and was brought out again for subsequent fire seasons up to 2000-2001. On December 27, 2001 Elvis, which had arrived in Melbourne, was immediately deployed to Bankstown, New South Wales to help with fire fighting efforts in the Sydney region and was lauded for its role in helping to save almost 300 homes. It was also credited with helping save the lives of 14 firemen in the Burragorang Valley in New South Wales.

Two other Aircranes, Georgia Peach (N154AC) and Incredible Hulk (N164AC), were rushed out from the US aboard a Russian Antonov An-124 air freighter to assist with the 2001-2002 Sydney bushfires following the successful deployment of Elvis.

A number of other Aircranes and Skycranes have subsequently been brought out to Australia for each bushfire season and based in South Australia, Western Australia, Victoria, New South Wales and the Australian Capital Territory.

Elvis has also lifted transmission towers in Alberta, Canada, and Ketchikan, Alaska as portrayed in the documentaries Rise of the Machines and Powerline Alaska.

== Aircrane (AC) and Skycrane (HT) deployments in Australia ==
Elvis at Wagga Wagga Airport in January 2012

- 1997–1998 Victoria: Millie (N223AC)
- 2001–2002 Victoria: Elvis (N179AC); New South Wales: Georgia Peach (N154AC) and Incredible Hulk (N164AC)
- 2002–2003 Victoria: Elvis (N179AC); New South Wales: Georgia Peach (N154AC) and Incredible Hulk (N164AC) and Isabelle (N178AC) and Gypsy Lady (N189AC).
- 2003–2004 Victoria: Elvis (N179AC); New South Wales: Isabelle (N178AC)
- 2004–2005 Victoria: Elvis (N179AC); New South Wales: Rocky (N722HT)
- 2006–2007 Victoria: Elvis (N179AC) and Malcolm (N217AC); New South Wales: Shania (N720HT); Australian Capital Territory: Delilah (N194AC)
- 2007–2008 Victoria: Elvis (N179AC) and Elsie (N218AC); New South Wales: Shania (N720HT); Australian Capital Territory, South Australia and Tasmania (shared): Incredible Hulk
- 2008–2009 Victoria: Elvis (N179AC) and Bluey a.k.a. Elsie (N218AC); New South Wales: Malcolm (N217AC) and Clancy a.k.a. Isabelle (N178AC); South Australia: Flynn a.k.a. Christine (N173AC); spare Delilah (N194AC); for the period of Australian operations, some aircraft have been temporarily renamed with Australian themed names.
- 2009–2010 Victoria: Elvis (N179AC)
- 2011–2012: Western Australia: Elsie (N218AC)
- 2012–2013 Victoria: Elvis (N179AC) and Gypsy Lady (N189AC).
- 2013–2014 New South Wales: Gypsy Lady (N189AC) and Ichabod (N957AC); Victoria:Delilah (N194AC) and Malcolm (N217AC)
- 2019-2020 New South Wales: Gypsy Lady (N189AC) and Jerry (N247AC); Victoria: Delilah (N194AC) and Marty (N243AC); South Australia: Elsie (N218AC); Western Australia: Georgia Peach (N154AC)

The aircranes are contracted to the various state and territory governments through the National Aerial Firefighting Centre.
