= National Aerial Firefighting Centre =

Not-for-profit company that manages Australia's national aerial firefighting fleet

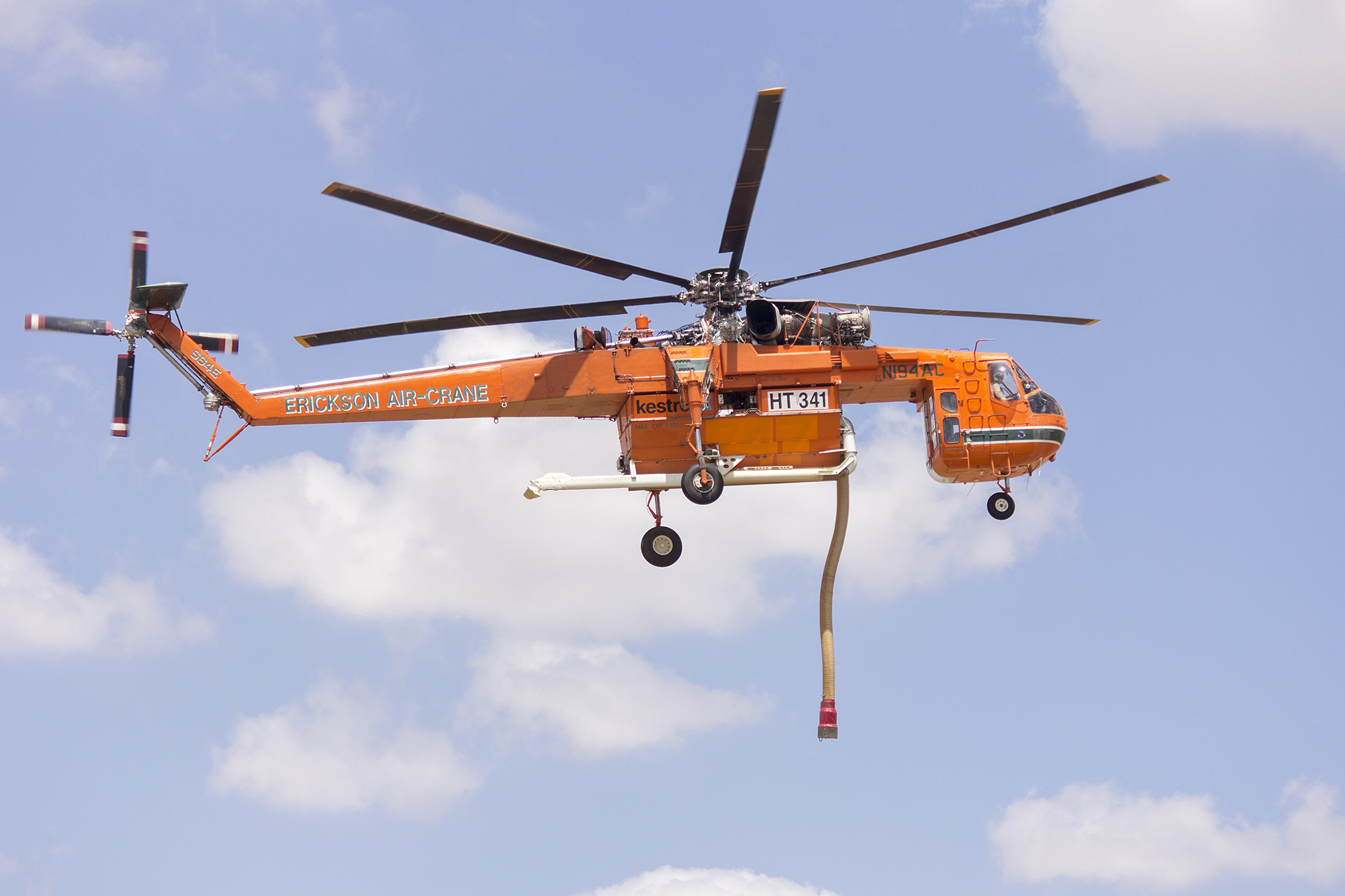
A Sikorsky S-64 fire fighting helicopter in Australia during 2014

National Aerial Firefighting Centre (NAFC) is a not-for-profit company that manages and coordinates Australia's national aerial firefighting fleet. The company provides Australian States and Territories resource sharing capabilities. The NAFC Board of Directors is made up of senior fire chiefs from around the country.

== Role ==
NAFC was developed in 2003 by representatives of the Australian Commonwealth, State and Territory Governments to provide a cooperative approach to manage aerial firefighting. The authorities recognised a need for a national approach to the determining and contracting of certain capabilities following extreme bushfires which affected Australia on a national level.

NAFC facilitates the coordination and procurement of a fleet of firefighting aircraft funded by both the Australian Government and State and Territory Governments and are utilised by State and Territory fire agencies nationally. Firefighting agencies have benefited from the availability of extra aircraft that can be easily moved from State to State, with the national arrangements allowing resources to be redeployed to areas experiencing high fire risk.

== Aerial Fleet ==
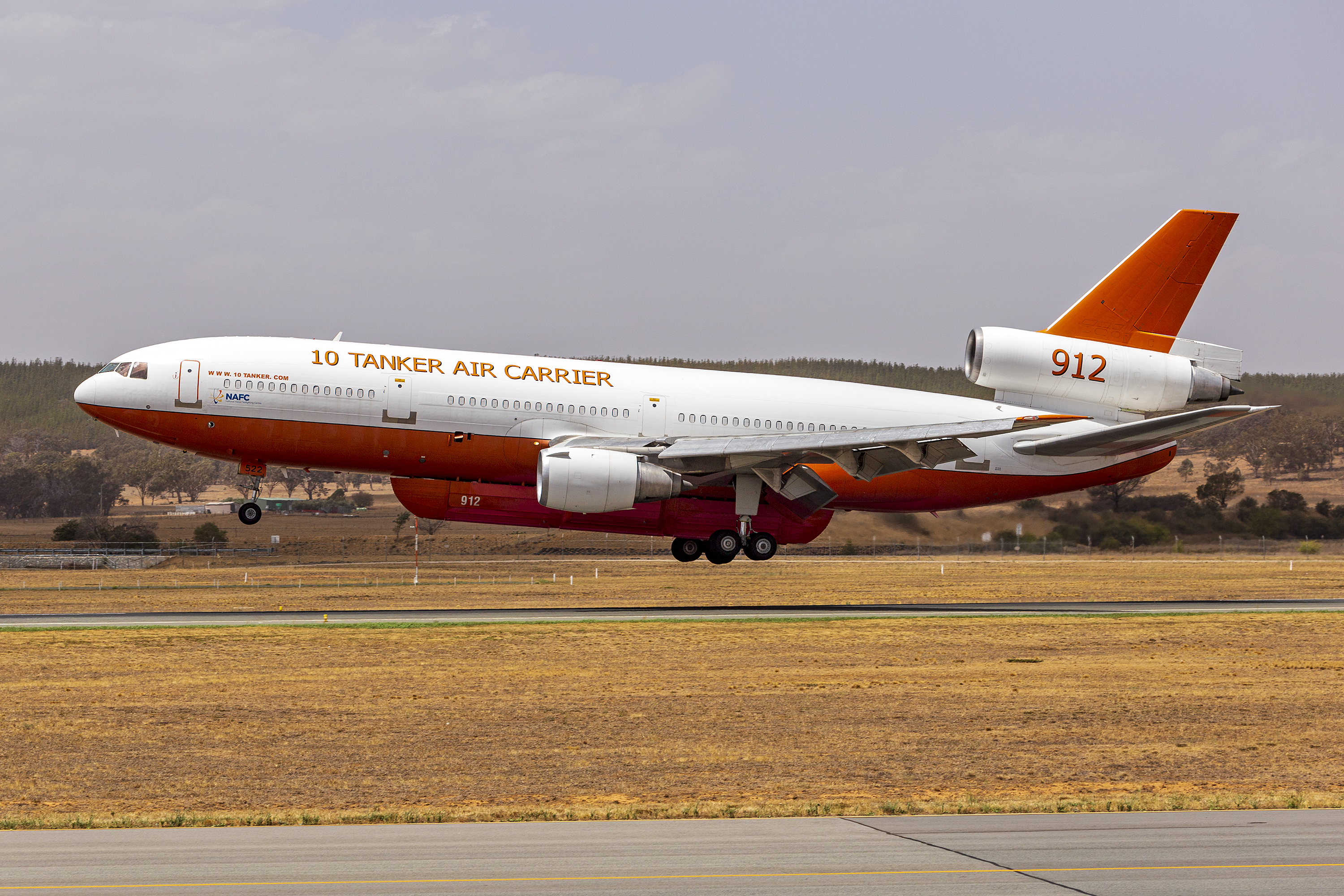
A McDonnell Douglas DC-10 water bomber landing at Canberra Airport in 2020

A wide range of fixed-wing and rotary-wing aircraft are used to support Australian fire operations. Aircraft are selected for individual tasks based on their suitability for the task and their cost effectiveness. There are currently 45 individual aircraft contracted through NAFC for the States and Territories. Keep in mind that there are also some other aircraft contracted directly to States and Territories.

Larger helicopters such as the Elvis (helicopter) and the Sikorsky S61N are most often used for firebombing and crew transportations, whilst smaller helicopters are more often used for command and control, mapping and aerial ignition.

Fixed-wing aircraft that are used for firebombing tend to be of the larger agricultural-style, specially modified for firebombing. These aircraft are sometimes referred to as SEATs (Single-Engined Air Tankers). This type of aircraft particularly suits the conditions most often encountered in Australia where there are relatively few long paved runways, but plenty of agricultural airstrips. Larger fixed-wing aircraft have been used where appropriate and cost-effective. Light fixed-wing aircraft are also regularly used for fire detection, reconnaissance, command and control.

== Aircraft Tracking ==
NAFC and its Members (Australian States and Territories) have decided to adopt a national standard approach to the provision of tracking and event logging services for aircraft involved in firefighting and related operations. It is planned that this will extend to messaging systems in the future. The adoption of a national approach follows extensive investigation and consultation with agencies and operators throughout Australia. A number of operational trials have also been undertaken.

== See also ==
Aerial Firefighting and Forestry in Southern Australia
