= Calcium borate =

Bluish white crystal found in some minerals

Names
- IUPAC names Calcium borate

Identifiers
CAS Number	12007-56-6
3D model (JSmol)	Interactive image
ChemSpider	118685
ECHA InfoCard	100.034.131
PubChem CID	134660
UNII	80UKT9A6QU
CompTox Dashboard (EPA)	DTXSID70930103 DTXSID1091555, DTXSID70930103
- InChI: InChI=1S/2BO3.3Ca/c2*2-1(3)4;;;/q2*-3;3*+2 Key: VLCLHFYFMCKBRP-UHFFFAOYSA-N; InChI=1/4BO3.6Ca/c4*2-1(3)4;;;;;;/q4*-3;6*+2 Key: KKKYJLNWARAYSD-UHFFFAOYAA; InChI=1/2BO3.3Ca/c2*2-1(3)4;;;/q2*-3;3*+2 Key: VLCLHFYFMCKBRP-UHFFFAOYAG
- SMILES: [Ca+2].[Ca+2].[Ca+2].[O-]B([O-])[O-].[O-]B([O-])[O-]

Properties
Chemical formula	Ca_{3}(BO_{3})_{2}
Molar mass	237.852 g/mol
Appearance	bluish white crystal

Hazards
Flash point	Non-flammable
- Lethal dose or concentration (LD, LC)
LD_{50} (median dose)	590 mg/kg (oral, mouse)
- Except where otherwise noted, data are given for materials in their standard state (at 25 °C [77 °F], 100 kPa). verify (what is ?) Infobox references

Calcium borate is a borate salt of calcium with the molecular formula Ca_{3}(BO_{3})_{2}. It can be prepared by reacting calcium metal with boric acid. The resulting precipitate is calcium borate. A hydrated form occurs naturally as the minerals colemanite, nobleite and priceite.

== Use ==
Calcium borate is used as a binder in some grades of hexagonal boron nitride for hot pressing.

Other uses include as a flame retardant in epoxy molding compounds, a ceramic flux in some ceramic glazes, reactive self-sealing binders in hazardous waste management, additive for insect-resistant polystyrene, fertilizer, and in the production of boron glasses.

It is used as a main source of boron oxide in the manufacturing of ceramic frits used in ceramic glaze or ceramic engobe for wall and floor ceramic tiles.
