= 2007–08 Australian bushfire season =

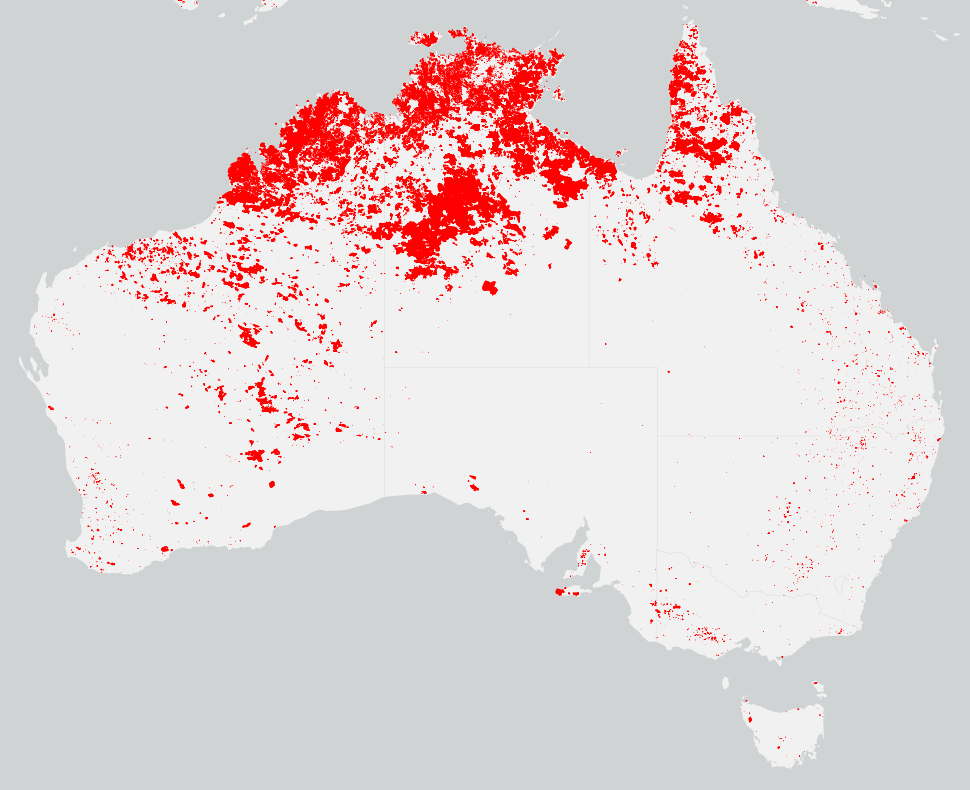
- NASA MODIS burned area detections from June 2007 to May 2008
- Date: June 2007 – May 2008
- Location: Australia

Statistics
- Burned area: >100,000 ha (250,000 acres)

Impacts
- Deaths: 5 total: 1 DSE volunteer firefighter; 4 other
- Structures destroyed: 3+ total: 3+ houses; numerous non-residential structures

The Australian bushfire season over the summer of 2007–2008, experienced fire occurrence below average for the season as some regions experienced increased rainfall and reduced fuel as a result of extensive fires during the previous 2006–07 season, particularly in Victoria where the fires in the 2006–07 season burnt over 1.1 million hectares of land. Fires in Victoria during the 2007–08 season burnt less than a fifth of the land area usually burnt during an average bushfire season.

An analysis of bushfires in Victoria on public land by the Department of Sustainability & Environment revealed that the 2007–08 fires burnt 32,368 hectares, or 18.7% of the long-term average of 173,152 hectares. It was also estimated that 26% of these fires were caused by lightning strikes and 25% by arson.

== Predictions ==
In the three months leading up to the summer 2007–08, many states and regions experienced far below average rainfalls and when several fires spread through October 2007, which led to predictions of an above average bushfire season, late rainfalls quelled bushfire occurrence later in the season.

== Fires of note ==
State	Start date	Deaths	Injuries	Houses lost	Area (ha)	Local govt.	Impacted communities & destruction	Duration	Ref.
Vic	20 November 2007	1				East Gippsland	near Cann River: A Department of Sustainability & Environment firefighter collapses fighting a fire		
SA	6 December 2007	1			95,000 ha (230,000 acres)	Kangaroo Island	Vivonne Bay: A civilian perishes; Significant livestock loss	8 days	
WA	30 December 2007	3			7,500 ha (19,000 acres)	Coolgardie	Coolgardie: 3 civilians perish; Up to 19 semi-trailer trucks destroyed		
WA	1 January 2008		2	2+	900 ha (2,200 acres)	Mundaring	Parkerville & Stoneville: 18 vehicles destroyed; 100 livestock perish		
SA	13 March 2008		9	1	150 ha (370 acres)	Onkaparinga	Willunga		
