= Climate of Launceston, Tasmania =

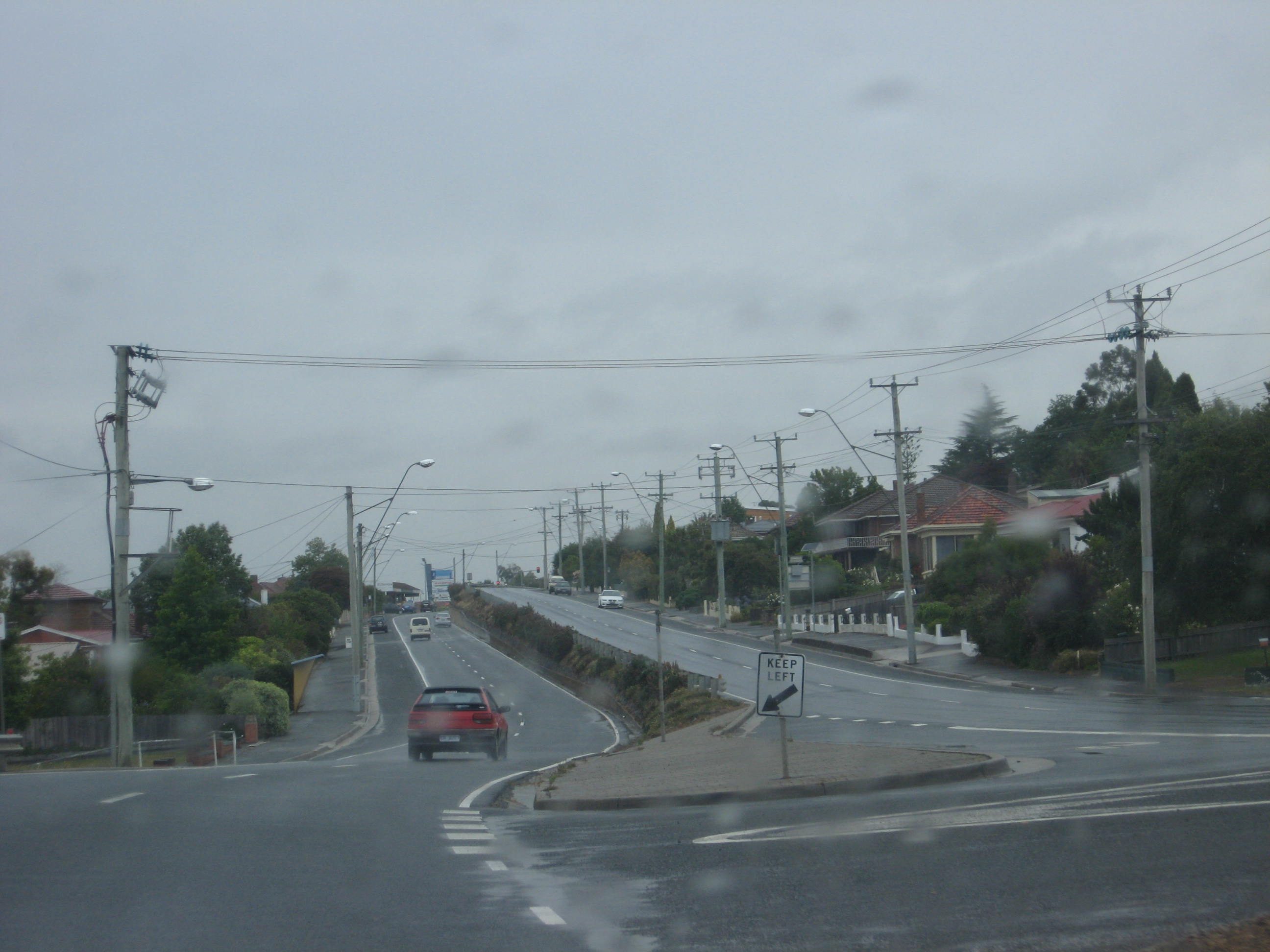
Summer rain, January 2008

Launceston, Tasmania has a cool, temperate climate, with four distinct seasons. The city is located in the Tamar Valley in Northern Tasmania and is surrounded by many large hills and mountains. With this type of topography, Launceston's weather patterns can change considerably in a short period.

== Background ==
The warmest months are in January and February with an average air temperature range of 12.2 °C (54 °F) up to 34.4 °C (94 °F). Throughout the year there is an average of 4.3 days a year over 30 °C (86 °F). The maximum recorded temperature was 39 °C (102 °F) on 30 January 2009, with Launceston Airport reaching 40.4 °C (105 °F) on that same day, during the 2009 Southeastern Australia heat wave. Having 2,500 hours of annual sunshine, Launceston is sunnier than Melbourne, a northward city in mainland Australia, which only receives around 2,300 hours of annual sunshine.

Winters are cool with minimum temperatures dropping below 2 °C (36 °F) an average of 61 days a year. The coldest month is July, with an average temperature range of 2.2 °C (36 °F) - 12.5 °C (55 °F). The lowest recorded minimum at Launceston's current weather station, Ti Tree Bend was −5.2 °C (22.6 °F). Unlike many other areas of Tasmania and as well as a number of cities in the northern hemisphere that lie on the same latitude (such as Chicago, Cleveland, Tashkent, Tbilisi and Shenyang), Launceston rarely receives snowfall and is relatively mild.

Winter, for Launceston, is also the season with the least amount of wind. Because of this and the topographical effect of the Tamar Valley, Launceston winters are renowned for foggy mornings, with Launceston Airport the most fog-bound commercial airport in Australia. The average annual rainfall, with moderate to low variability is 665 mm (26 in), with 1 millimetre (0.04 in) falling an average of 88.4 days a year. The most rain Ti Tree Bend has received in a year was 829.6 millimetres (32.66 in) in 1992, though Launceston Airport received 953.1 millimetres (37.52 in) during 1956. As in most of Tasmania, 2006 was the driest year when just 394.8 millimetres (15.54 in) fell.

== Precipitation ==
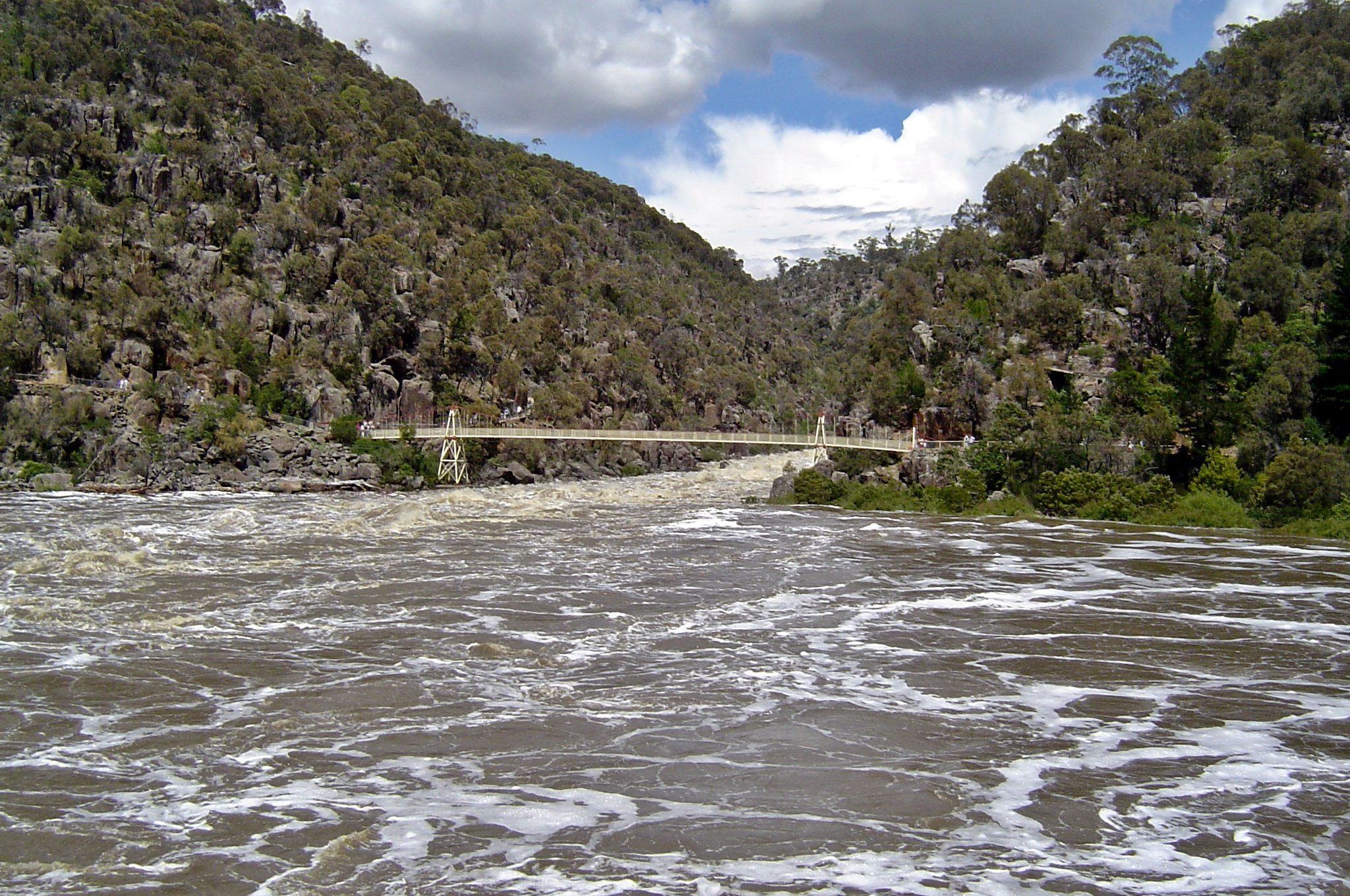
Cataract Gorge in flood

There is an average of 663.4 millimetres (26.12 in) of rain a year (676.6 millimetres (26.64 in) at the airport). Cold fronts in winter account for much of this precipitation, with mountains surrounding Launceston regularly receiving snow in autumn, winter and spring. Launceston annual rainfall is somewhat lower than that of surrounding areas, particularly further north in the Tamar valley. This is due to the rain shadow effect of the Western Tiers located West of the city.

Rainfall elements
	Jan	Feb	Mar	Apr	May	Jun	Jul	Aug	Sep	Oct	Nov	Dec	Yearly
Highest monthly rainfall	139.4	107.4	106.2	124.6	152.9	183.0	157.7	183.6	115.8	121.4	85.2	145.1	829.6
Lowest monthly rainfall	9.8	0.0	2.6	4.3	4.0	4.3	36.8	14.9	8.4	9.9	5.6	6.1	394.8
Source: Climate statistics for Launceston (Ti Tree Bend), Bureau of Meteorology

== Seasonal conditions ==
Launceston has a cool, temperate climate, with four distinct seasons. Surrounded by many large hills and mountains, Launceston's weather patterns can change considerably in a short period. The warmest months are in January and February with an average air temperature range of 12.2 °C (54 °F) to 24.4 °C (76 °F). Throughout the year there is an average of 4.3 days a year over 30 °C (86 °F). The maximum recorded temperature was 39 °C (102 °F) on 30 January 2009, with Launceston Airport reaching 40.4 °C (105 °F) on that same day, during the 2009 Southeastern Australia heat wave. Winters are cool with minimum temperatures dropping below 2 °C (36 °F) an average of 61 days a year. The coldest month is July, with an average temperature range of 2.2 °C (36 °F) to 12.5 °C (55 °F). The lowest recorded minimum at Launceston's current weather station, Ti Tree Bend, was −5.2 °C (22.6 °F), and unlike many other areas of Tasmania, Launceston rarely receives snowfall.

The average annual rainfall, with moderate to low variability, is 665 mm (26 in), falling on an average of 88.4 days a year. The most rain Launceston received in a year was 1,017 millimetres (40.0 in) in 2016, with 2006 being the driest year when just 394.8 millimetres (15.54 in) fell.

The Bureau of Meteorology reported that 2007 was the hottest year ever recorded in Launceston since temperatures were first recorded in 1884. Temperatures ranged from a minimum of 8.1 °C (46.6 °F) to a maximum of 19.2 °C (66.6 °F). During 2006 and 2007, Launceston had the hottest maximums throughout the state. In 2008, Launceston had the highest average maximum temperature out of all Tasmanian cities with 18.6 °C (65.5 °F).

Climate data for Launceston
Month	Jan	Feb	Mar	Apr	May	Jun	Jul	Aug	Sep	Oct	Nov	Dec	Year
Record high °C (°F)	39.0 (102.2)	34.4 (93.9)	33.5 (92.3)	27.7 (81.9)	22.9 (73.2)	18.4 (65.1)	18.4 (65.1)	20.3 (68.5)	24.8 (76.6)	28.7 (83.7)	30.7 (87.3)	34.1 (93.4)	39.0 (102.2)
Mean daily maximum °C (°F)	24.5 (76.1)	24.6 (76.3)	22.6 (72.7)	19.0 (66.2)	15.8 (60.4)	13.2 (55.8)	12.7 (54.9)	13.8 (56.8)	15.7 (60.3)	18.2 (64.8)	20.6 (69.1)	22.6 (72.7)	18.6 (65.5)
Mean daily minimum °C (°F)	12.4 (54.3)	12.3 (54.1)	10.3 (50.5)	7.5 (45.5)	5.1 (41.2)	2.9 (37.2)	2.3 (36.1)	3.6 (38.5)	5.2 (41.4)	7.0 (44.6)	9.1 (48.4)	10.8 (51.4)	7.4 (45.3)
Record low °C (°F)	2.5 (36.5)	3.4 (38.1)	0.5 (32.9)	−1.5 (29.3)	−3 (27)	−4.9 (23.2)	−5.2 (22.6)	−3.5 (25.7)	−2.4 (27.7)	−1.4 (29.5)	−2 (28)	2.0 (35.6)	−5.2 (22.6)
Average rainfall mm (inches)	45.9 (1.81)	31.2 (1.23)	39.7 (1.56)	49.7 (1.96)	65.0 (2.56)	67.4 (2.65)	80.2 (3.16)	84.8 (3.34)	65.5 (2.58)	49.6 (1.95)	52.2 (2.06)	48.7 (1.92)	679.9 (26.78)
Average rainy days (≥ 0.2 mm)	7.2	6.3	6.8	8.8	11.4	12.6	14.6	15.3	14.0	11.2	9.9	8.5	126.6
Source: Bureau of Meteorology

=== Summer ===
During the summer, city minimums range from 9 °C (48 °F) in December, and up to 10.3 °C (51 °F) in February. High temperatures during Summer range from 21.2 °C (70 °F) in December and 23.2 °C (74 °F) in the hottest month, February. Temperatures above 30 °C (86 °F) are extremely rare compared even to cities like Melbourne, occurring on fewer than five days per year as against thirty in Melbourne and over fifty in Adelaide. Launceston generally does not receive as many large thunderstorms as cities in mainland Australia, although during summer, thunderstorms are more frequent than in any other season. The Launceston suburb of Summerhill was hit by a tornado that descended from a thunderstorm on Christmas Eve 2001. Estimates suggest the tornado had wind speeds of between 200 and 250 km/h (120 and 160 mph). There is an average of 4.5 days each summer of temperatures over 30.0 °C (86 °F) and during the 2009 South Eastern Australia heatwave, Ti Tree Bend surpassed its previous record temperature of 35 °C (95 °F) three days straight. Rainfall is at its lowest during Summer, with an average of 41.9 millimetres (1.65 in) and approximately 22 days of rain during the three months.

Summer Record
	Record	Date
Highest Summer Maximum Temperature	39.9 °C (104 °F)	30 January 2009
Lowest Summer Minimum Temperature	−1.0 °C (30 °F)	20 December 1977
Highest Summer Monthly Rainfall	164.1 millimetres (6.46 in)	February 1969
Lowest Summer Monthly Rainfall	0.0 millimetres (0 in)	February 1983

=== Autumn ===
Autumn is a season of transition, and generally has the most settled weather patterns, although Launceston's worst floods both occurred in Autumn. City minimums range from 5.1 °C (41 °F) in May, and up to 10.0 °C (50 °F) in March. High temperatures during Autumn range from 15.8 °C (60 °F) in May up to 22.4 °C (72 °F) in March.

Autumn Record
	Record	Date
Highest Autumn Maximum Temperature	34.9 °C (95 °F)	4 March 1942
Lowest Autumn Minimum Temperature	−4.8 °C (23 °F)	23 May 2001
Highest Autumn Monthly Rainfall	183.6 millimetres (7.23 in)	May 1958
Lowest Autumn Monthly Rainfall	2.1 millimetres (0.083 in)	March 1972

=== Winter ===
On average, wintertime lows dip down to 2.3 °C (36 °F) in July, while daytime highs range from 12.5 °C (55 °F) in July up to 13.7 °C (57 °F) in August. Winter is typically the season with the least amount of wind, although the increased occurrence of cold frontal systems during the cooler months have helped cause wind gusts of up to 113 km/h (70 mph) - in the winters of 1949 and 1984 at Launceston Airport, 14.8 km (9.2 mi) away from Ti Tree Bend. This passage of cold frontal systems are responsible for winter being Launceston's and the rest of northern and western Tasmania's wettest season.

Winter Record
	Record	Date
Highest Winter Maximum Temperature	18.7 °C (66 °F)	26 August 2004
Lowest Winter Minimum Temperature	−7.1 °C (19 °F)	24 June 1972
Highest Winter Monthly Rainfall	229.2 millimetres (9.02 in)	August 1936
Lowest Winter Monthly Rainfall	8.2 millimetres (0.32 in)	June 2007

=== Spring ===
Spring is mostly a transition from winter to summer. Cold weather reaches Tasmania less often and temperatures slowly begin to rise. Snowfalls, although rare, have been recorded in Launceston's surrounding areas as late as October, during 1940, 1978, 2003 and 2020. The month of October experiences the greatest rise in temperatures.

Spring Record
	Record	Date
Highest Spring Maximum Temperature	30.7 °C (87 °F)	1 November 1987
Lowest Spring Minimum Temperature	−2.4 °C (28 °F)	7 September 1994
Highest Spring Monthly Rainfall	163.1 millimetres (6.42 in)	October 1947
Lowest Spring Monthly Rainfall	8.0 millimetres (0.31 in)	September 1994

== 2009 Southeastern Australia heat wave ==
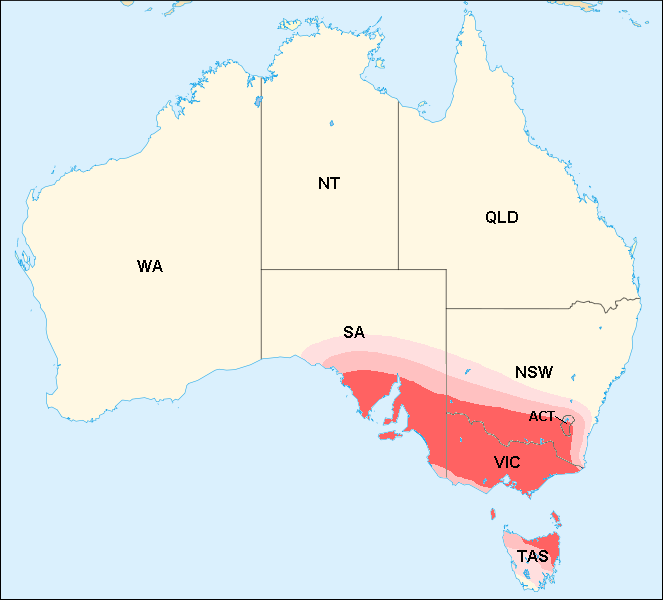
Approximate affected area shown in red

The 2009 southeastern Australia heat wave was a heat wave that commenced in late January and led to record-breaking prolonged high temperatures in the region. During the heat wave, 50 separate locations across Australia set various records for consecutive, highest daytime and overnight temperatures.

The exceptional heat wave was caused by a slow moving high-pressure system that settled over the Tasman Sea, with a combination of an intense tropical low located off the North West Australian coast and a monsoon trough over Northern Australia, which produced ideal conditions for hot tropical air to be directed down over Southeastern Australia. The heat began in South Australia on 25 January but became more widespread over southeast Australia by 27 January. A weak cool change moved over the southern coastal areas bringing some relief on 30 January; in Melbourne the change arrived on the evening and dropped temperatures to an average of 30.8 °C (87.4 °F). Higher temperatures returned on the following weekend with Melbourne recording its hottest day since records began in 1855: 46.4 °C (115.5 °F), also the hottest temperature ever recorded in an Australian capital city.

During the heat wave, several records were broken; Tasmania recorded its highest ever temperature; 42.2 °C (108 °F) in Scamander, and the long-standing Tasmanian record of 40.8 °C (105.4 °F) (recorded in Hobart on 4 January 1976) was broken five times within two days at Flinders Island, Fingal (twice), St Helens and Scamander. Launceston recorded its highest recorded temperature of 38.2 °C (100.8 °F) on 31 January. The heat wave generated extreme fire conditions during the peak of the 2008–09 Australian bushfire season, causing many bushfires in the affected region, contributing to the extreme bushfire conditions on 7 February, also known as the February 2009 Victorian bushfires, which claimed 173 lives in Victoria.

Launceston in January 2009

- 28th – 33.8 °C (92.8 °F)
- 29th – 36.9 °C (98.4 °F)
- 30th – 39.0 °C (102.2 °F) - Hottest day recorded in Launceston since records began in 1880.
- 31st – 38.2 °C (100.8 °F)

== See also ==
- Environment of Australia
