= Bushfires in Victoria =

History of fires in Victoria, Australia

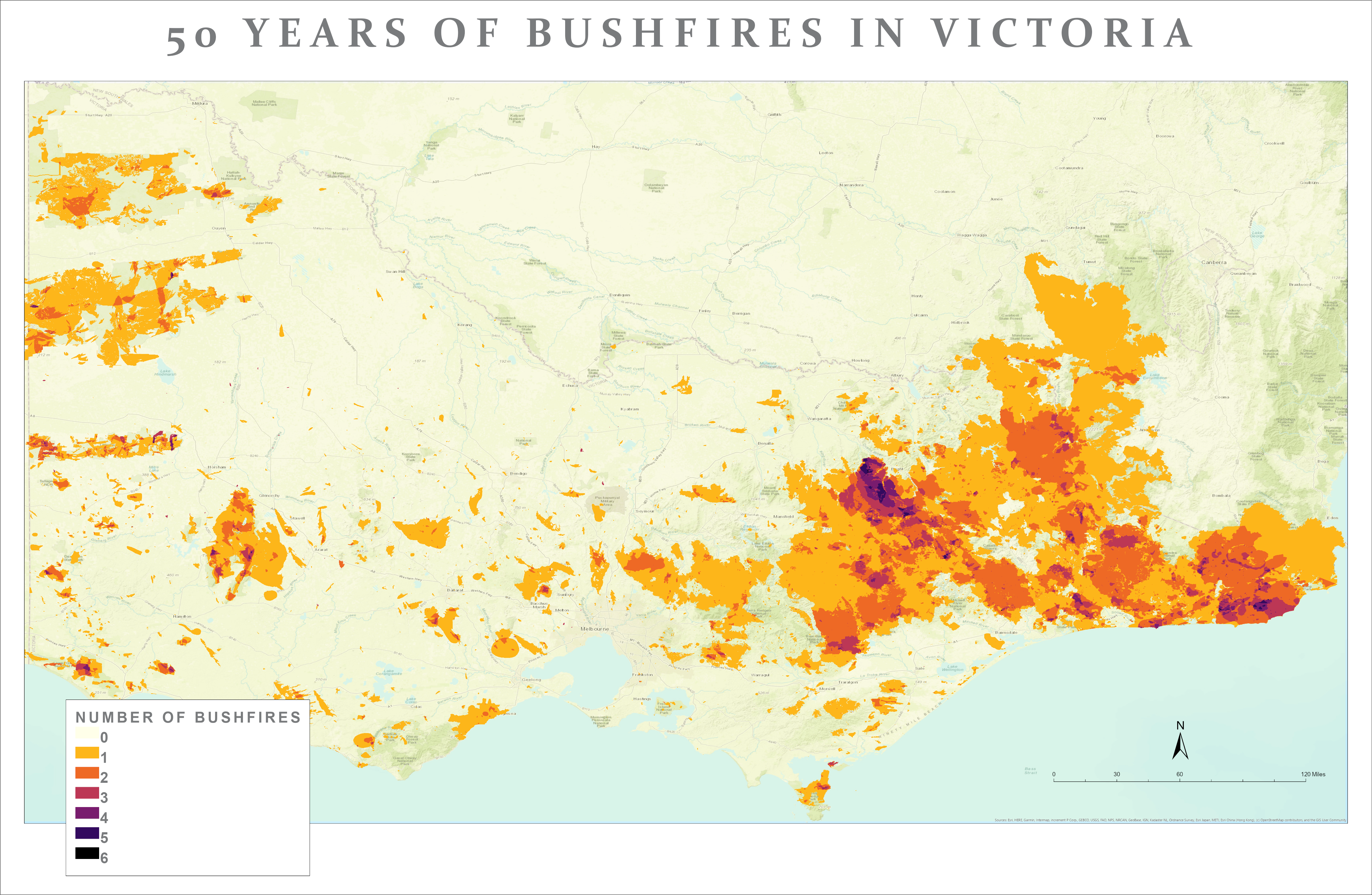
Map of all of the bushfires in Victoria in the last 50 years

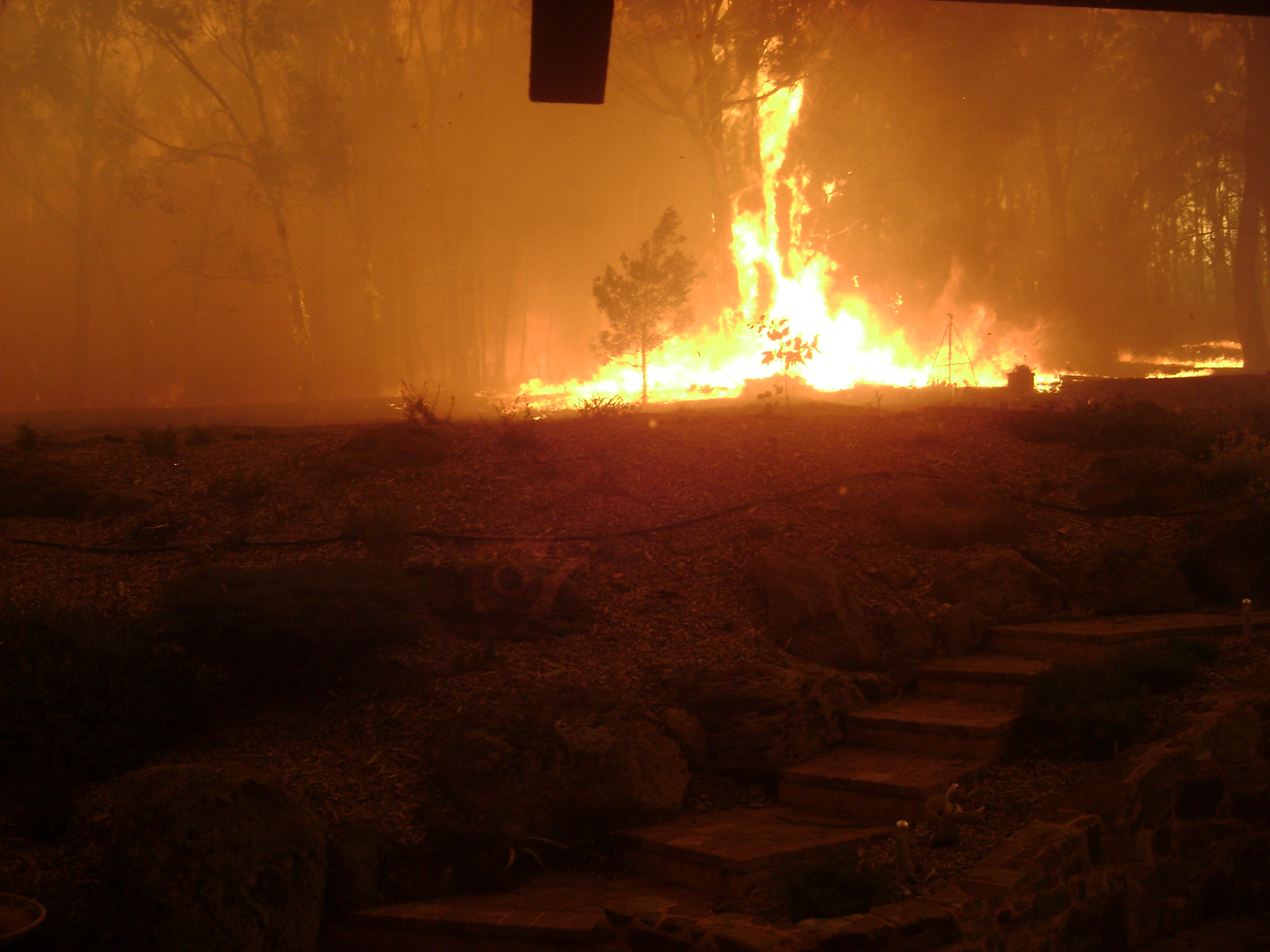
Black Saturday bushfires at Steels Creek in 2009

The state of Victoria in Australia has had a long history of catastrophic bushfires.

The most deadly of these, the Black Saturday bushfires of 2009 claiming 173 lives. Legislation, planning, management, and suppression are the responsibilities of the Victorian State Government

== By number of fires ==
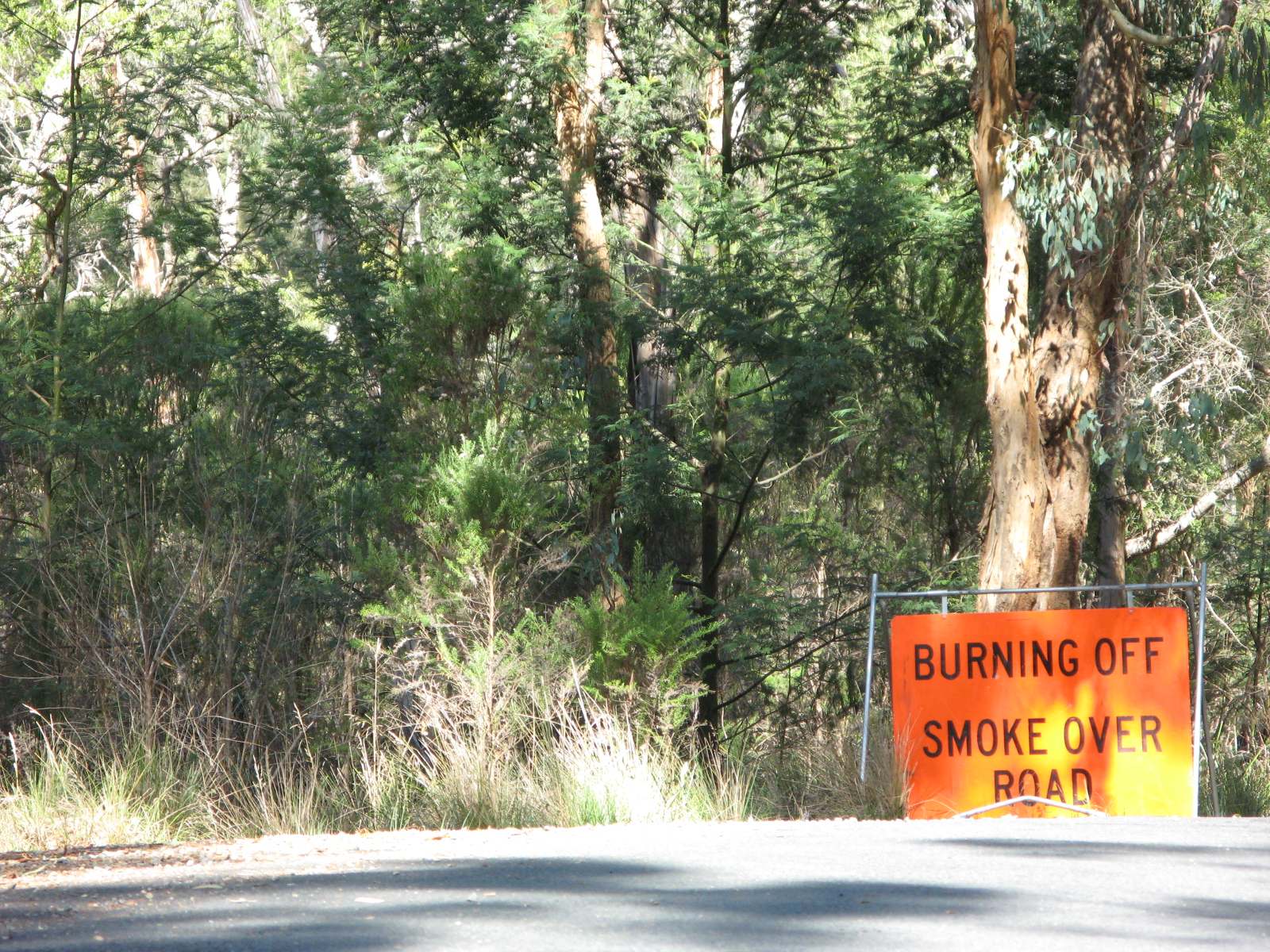
Signage indicating to motorists that smoke from controlled burns may be in the area

- Lightning - 26%
- Deliberate - 25%
- Agricultural - 16%
- Campfire - 10%
- Cigarettes/Matches - 7%
- Unknown Causes - 6%

== By area burnt ==
- Lightning - 46%
- Public Utilities - 14%
- Deliberate - 14%
- Misc - 9%
- Agricultural - 7%
- Planned burn escapes - 5%
- Unknown Causes - 3%
- Machinery/Exhaust - 2%
- Campfire - 1%
- Cigarettes/Matches - less than 1%

== Major Victorian Bushfires ==
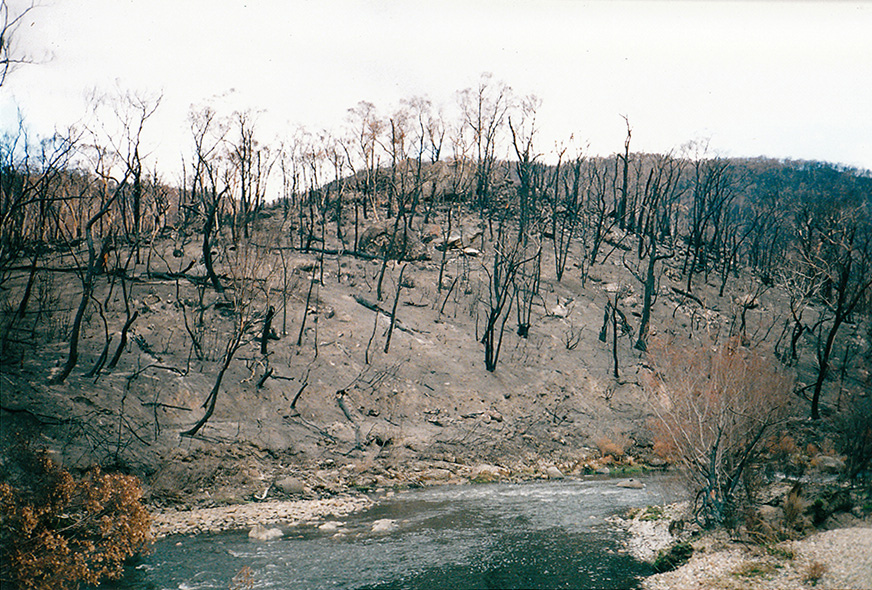
Intense fires can seriously impact the environment, such as here by the Big River, near Anglers Rest, Gippsland, after the 2003 fires

=== Most extensive fires ===
- 1851 - 6 February "Black Thursday" (5 million hectares)
- 1938-39 - December - January "Black Friday" (2 million hectares)
- 2020 - 3 January "2019–20 Australian bushfire season" (1.5+ million hectares)
- 2003 - January - March "2003 Eastern Victorian alpine bushfires" (1.3 million hectares)
- 2006-07 - 1 December - 6 February "Eastern Victoria Great Divide bushfires" (1.2 -1.3 million hectares)
- 1944 - January - February (1 million hectares)
- 1983 - 16 February "Ash Wednesday" (510,000 hectares)
- 2009 - 7 February "Black Saturday" (450,000 hectares)
- 1965 - Gippsland (300,000 hectares)
- 1898 - 1 February "Red Tuesday" (260,000 hectares)

=== Deadliest fires ===
- 2009 - 7 February - March "Black Saturday" (173 deaths)
- 1939 - December - January "Black Friday" (71 deaths)
- 1926 - 14 February - March "Black Sunday" (60 deaths)
- 1944 - December - February (51 deaths)
- 1983 - 16 February "Ash Wednesday" (47 in Victoria)
- 1962 - 14–16 January (33 deaths)
- 1969 - 8 January (23 deaths)
- 1942 - Western Victoria (20 deaths)
- 1905 - 1 December (12 deaths)
- 1898 - 1 February "Red Tuesday" (12 deaths)
- 1851 - 6 February "Black Thursday" (12 deaths)
- 1943 - 22 December (10 deaths)
- 1952 - January - March, Central Victoria (10 deaths)
- 1977 - 12 February, Western Victoria (8 deaths)
- 1965 - 17 January (7 deaths) Longwood, Northern Victoria
- 1998 - 2 December (5 deaths) Linton, Western Victoria
- 1985 - 14 January (3 deaths) Avoca, Central Victoria
- 1997 - 21 January (3 deaths) Dandenong Ranges

== See also ==
- Wildfire
- Bushfires in Australia
- 2015–16 Australian bushfire season
- 2019–20 Australian bushfire season
- Aerial firefighting and forestry in southern Australia
