= 2008–09 Australian bushfire season =

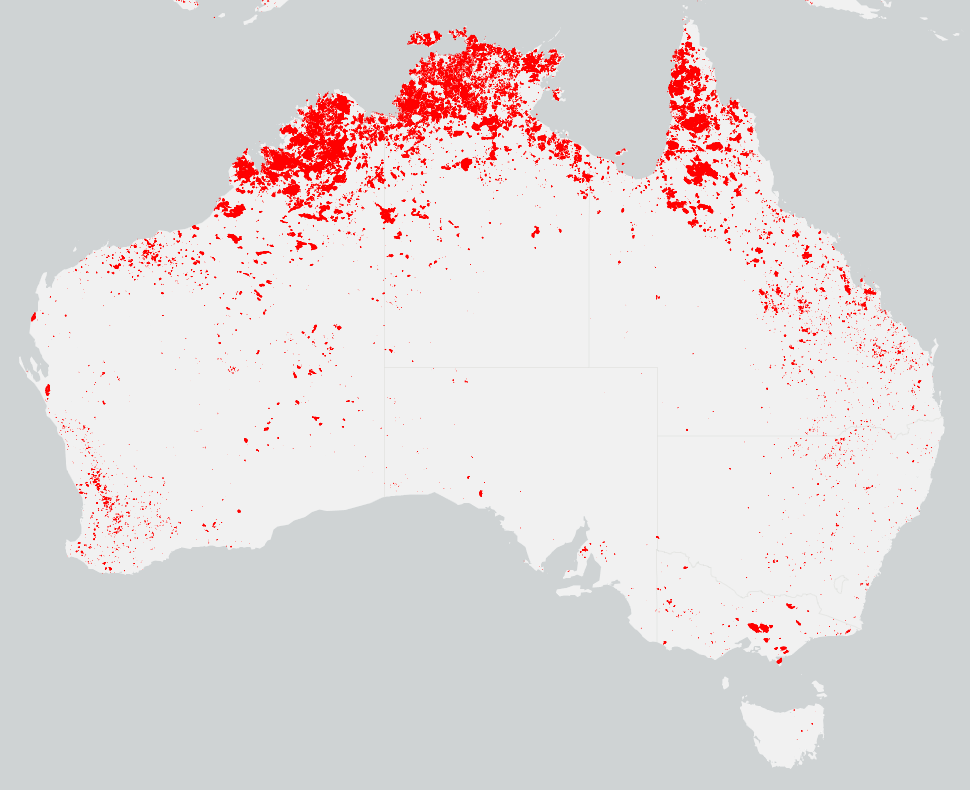
- NASA MODIS burned area detections from June 2008 to May 2009
- Date: Winter 2008 – Autumn 2009
- Location: Australia

Statistics
- Burned area: At least 450,000 ha (1,100,000 acres)

Impacts
- Deaths: 173
- Injuries: 414
- Structures destroyed: 3600+ total: 2140 houses; 1500+ non-residential structures

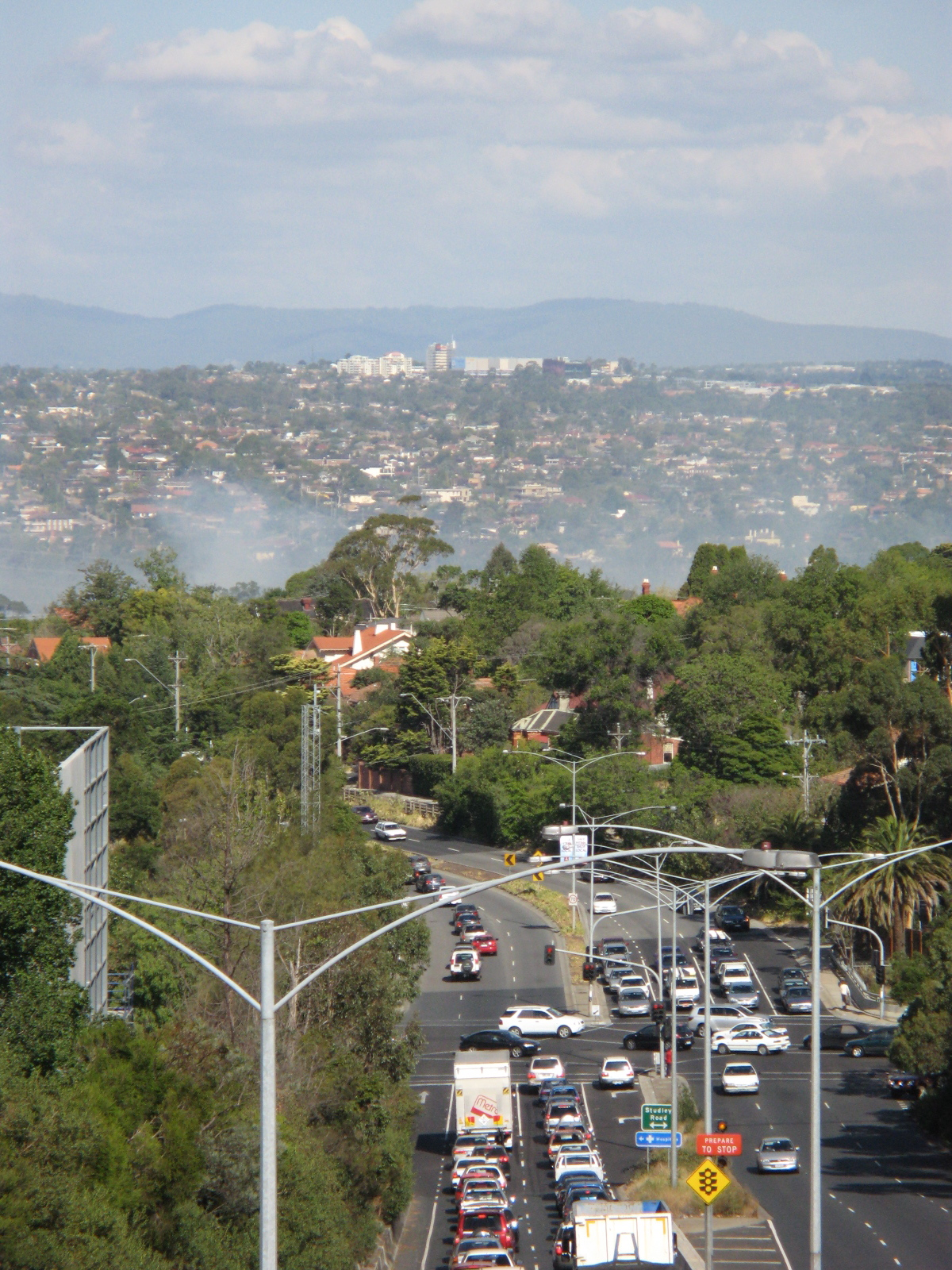
Smoke from a bushfire in the Yarra Flats, between Heidelberg and Bulleen, that burnt 5 hectares on 12 February

The Australian bushfire season ran from late December 2008 to April/May 2009. Above average rainfalls in December, particularly in Victoria, delayed the start of the season, but by January 2009, conditions throughout South eastern Australia worsened with the onset of one of the region's worst heat waves. On 7 February, extreme bushfire conditions precipitated major bushfires throughout Victoria, involving several large fire complexes, which continued to burn across the state for around one month. 173 people lost their lives in these fires and 414 were injured. 3,500+ buildings were destroyed, including 2,029 houses, and 7,562 people displaced.

Late 2008 had relatively few bushfires. Victoria in particular experienced higher than average rainfall in December, decreasing the fire danger in many regions of the state. Initial observations in October 2008 predicted an above average fire potential across Australia's coastal regions and a below average potential in Central Australia, where drought has reduced the available fuel.

In late January and early February, the effects of the 2009 southeastern Australia heat wave increased temperatures across south-eastern Australia, particularly in Victoria and South Australia, where several locations broke all time temperature records. Various days of high wind speed, combined with the hot dry conditions, created extreme bushfire conditions between 25 January and 7 February 2009.

== Predictions and assessments ==
In October 2008, fire potential in Australia was assessed as being above average around the coast of the continent and below average inland. La Niña conditions were observed during the latter portion of 2007 and early 2008. However, throughout the year the majority of the continent, except for far north Queensland and the northern Northern Territory, experienced much lower than normal rainfall. Central Australia had experienced below average rainfall for several years, reducing fuel and thus reducing the overall fire potential.

== Fires of note ==
State	Start date	Deaths	Injuries	Houses lost	Area (ha)	Local govt.	Impacted communities & destruction	Duration	Ref.
SA	12 January 2009			4	280 ha (690 acres)	Port Lincoln	Port Lincoln: 2 tuna processing factories and a winery destroyed		
WA	16 January 2009			5	6,000 ha (15,000 acres)	Bridgetown-Greenbushes	Bridgetown: 4 non-residential structures and significant numbers of livestock destroyed	5 days	
VIC	28 January 2009			44	6,500 ha (16,000 acres)	Latrobe	Boolarra, Churchill, Mirboo North & Yinnar: At least 80 non-residential structures, 10 cars and several other vehicles destroyed	12 days	
VIC	7 February 2009; Black Saturday	119	232	1242	125,000 ha (310,000 acres)	Nillumbik, Mitchell, Yarra Ranges & Whittlesea	Arthurs Creek, Broadford, Chum Creek, Clonbinane, Dixons Creek, Flowerdale, Hazeldene, Heathcote Junction, Humevale, Kinglake, Kinglake West, Smiths Gully, St. Andrews, Strathewen, Wandong, Whittlesea & Yarra Glen: 399 machinery sheds, 19 dairies, 26 wool sheds, 729 other farm buildings destroyed; Over 1000 civilian and agricultural vehicles destroyed; Scores of industrial, commercial and retail properties destroyed; Churches, police stations, a fire station, SES management centre and Strathewen and Middle Kinglake primary schools destroyed	9 days	
VIC	7 February 2009; Black Saturday	40	73	538	43,000 ha (110,000 acres)	Murrindindi	Buxton, Marysville, Narbethong & TaggertyTaggerty: Marysville commercial centre is completely destroyed, including dozens of hotels and retail properties; Marysville police station, primary school, kindergarten and health clinic destroyed; Hundreds of civilian and agricultural vehicles destroyed; Hundreds of other non-residential structures destroyed; Severe damage to water and power infrastructure and numerous historic sites	26 days	
VIC	7 February 2009; Black Saturday	11	35	145	26,000 ha (64,000 acres)	Latrobe & Wellington	Balook, Callignee North, Callignee South, Callignee, Carrajung South, Devon, Hazelwood North, Hazelwood South, Jeeralang North, Koornalla, Le Roy, Traralgon South & Yarram: Scores of non-residential structures and outbuildings destroyed, including commercial properties; Over 100 civilian and agricultural vehicles destroyed	12 days	
VIC	7 February 2009; Black Saturday	1	41	58	340 ha (840 acres)	Greater Bendigo	Eaglehawk, Ironbark, Long Gully, Maiden Gully & West Bendigo: 115 outbuildings and scores of vehicles destroyed; Several industrial properties destroyed	2 days	
VIC	7 February 2009; Black Saturday	2	12	38	33,500 ha (83,000 acres)	Indigo	Beechworth, Dederang, Kancoona, Mudgegonga, Myrtleford & Stanley: Several non-residential structures, vehicles and items of agricultural machinery destroyed	9 days	
VIC	7 February 2009; Black Saturday		2	31	26,200 ha (65,000 acres)	Cardinia & Baw Baw	Drouin West, Jindivick, Jindivick West, Jindivick North, Labertouche & Robin Hood: Many non-residential structures, dozens of vehicles destroyed	25 days	
VIC	7 February 2009; Black Saturday		1	14	7,100 ha (18,000 acres)	Greater Bendigo	Redesdale: 50 non-residential structures, several vehicles destroyed; Significant livestock losses	2 days	
VIC	7 February 2009; Black Saturday			13	2,400 ha (5,900 acres)	Horsham	Haven & Vectis: Several vehicles, Horsham Golf Clubhouse destroyed	2 days	
VIC	7 February 2009; Black Saturday			7	160 ha (400 acres)	Casey	Lynbrook & Narre Warren: Many non-residential structures, vehicles and other structures destroyed	2 days	
VIC	7 February 2009; Black Saturday		1	1	700 ha (1,700 acres)	Southern Grampians	Coleraine	2 days	

== Timeline ==
=== September–November ===
In September, a lightning strike started a fire on the western side of Flinders Island in Bass Strait. Strong winds initially made containing the fire difficult.

=== December ===
In Western Australia, bushfires were started by lightning strikes in the Cape Le Grand National Park, west of Esperance, on Friday, 19 December. Authorities maintained contact with 280 campers in the national park over the weekend and gave them the choice of leaving or staying. By Monday the 22nd, visitors to the park were unable to gain access; over 200 campers were relocated, while 75 campers decided to stay in the park. Crews from other regions of Western Australia were called in to assist local authorities over the weekend of 20–21 December.

=== January ===
In late January, Victoria and South Australia experienced extreme fire conditions with temperatures in the low to mid 40s°C (104 °F) in Melbourne and Adelaide, higher in the northern parts of the states, and increasing wind speed.

The fires in late January were precipitated by the accompanying 2009 Southern Australia heat wave.

Victoria

On 4 January, small fires in Koondrook, near Kerang, Victoria, burnt areas of river red gum forest along the Murray River.

On 28 January, multiple fires started throughout Victoria, the largest in McCrae on the Mornington Peninsula, which burnt 4 hectares (9.9 acres) of land alongside the Mornington Peninsula Freeway, threatening neighbouring houses. Authorities closed the freeway in both directions during the afternoon. The fire was contained by 6 pm with minimal property damage. The same day, a fire also burnt near Mount Disappointment, where smoke posed a danger to road users in the Clonbinane area, and a grass fire 8 kilometres (5.0 mi) south of Winchelsea in Wurdiboluc, that burnt 20 hectares (49 acres).

On the night of 28 January, CFA fire crews dealt with a small fire near Delburn in Gippsland which had burnt 30 ha (74 acres) of land, and on the afternoon of 29 January, attended two more fires in the same area, one of which threatened a local pine plantation. Also on 29 January, the CFA attended, and soon controlled, two small grass fires near the city of Sale, which were thought to have been deliberately lit.

Late on 29 January and into the following morning, the two fires at Delburn had joined, and were being fought by over 500 personnel; the fires had burnt 10 km^{2} 1,000 ha (2,500 acres) in the area near Boolarra and Darlimurra, south of the city of Morwell. Also, a fire in Branxholme, near Hamilton, started, threatening homes in Branxholme, and Byaduk. After burning 603 hectares (1,490 acres) the fire was contained and later controlled the following day.

By 30 January, the Delburn fire had spotted east towards Yinnar and Boolarra, and south towards Mirboo North. 15 different 'urgent threat' messages were delivered to Darlimurla, Yinnar, Boolarra and Mirboo North residents. Almost thirty homes were destroyed in the area.

On the evening of 31 January, fire crews focused on containing the fire's northern flank, which was within 2 km of the main power transmission lines supplying electricity to Melbourne from the Latrobe Valley; the fires also threatened the Hazelwood Power Station.

By 1 February, containment lines had been established around the Boolarra fires, although it was not yet under control. The fire had burned through 65 km^{2} 6,500 ha (16,000 acres) and destroyed 29 houses, along with various outbuildings and also livestock. On 3 February, authorities had divided the fires into six sectors, five of which were classified as contained, and only one, near Mirboo North, remained uncontained.

On 2 February, twenty-three new fires were lit – mostly due to lightning strikes – including three in the Bunyip State Park, and further fires near Drouin West and Leongatha. However, increased humidity helped contain the fires, according to a DSE duty officer.

Police believed that the fires that formed the Delburn/Boolarra complex were deliberately lit, and offered a A$100,000 reward for information leading to the arrest of suspected arsonists.

In the wake of the Gippsland fires, Bruce Esplin, the Victorian Emergency Services Commissioner, proposed a review of building regulations applicable in certain fire-prone areas, saying that "I believe that with the changes and the frequency and the severity of the bushfires we're experiencing, I think the community is going to have a rethink about where we build or if you build in a place like that". Also following those fires, Bob Cameron, the Victorian Minister for Emergency Services, announced that the Victorian government was considering ways to tackle arsonists, including the potential for a register of arsonists accessible to police.

South Australia

A bushfire near Port Lincoln in South Australia destroyed two houses and several other buildings on 13 January. The fire was brought under control by midday on the 14th. The fire was driven by high temperatures (43 degrees Celsius; 109 degrees Fahrenheit) and strong north-westerly winds. A total of 260 hectares (640 acres) was burned by the fire, brought under control thanks to milder conditions on 14 January.

New South Wales

In the Blue Mountains, three bushfires burning on privately owned land were in the process of being contained. Authorities want to ensure that the fires don't enter a nearby national park where they could potentially spread throughout the Blue Mountains National Park.

On 1 February 2009 the New South Wales Rural Fire Service declared a Section 44 for 2 bushfires burning near Tumut, New South Wales and one near Cabramurra, New South Wales after being started by dry thunderstorm overnight on 31 January 2009. The Meadow Creek fire was contained after burning 50 hectares of bushland in the Minjary National Park approximately 8 kilometres northwest of Tumut. The Mill Creek fire was burning uncontained which has burnt approximately 20 hectares of bushland approximately fourteen kilometres south east of Tumut. Happy Valley fire is burning in a steep gorge within the Kosciuszko National Park approximately kilometre from Cabramurra and has burnt 60 hectares.

Western Australia

On 16 January 2009 a fire broke out around Bridgetown in the South West and destroyed at least three properties in the area. At the same time a fire that started in Two Rocks north of Perth burned over 8,000 hectares of bushland in and around Yanchep National Park. Also on 16 January, a fire burned 40 hectares of parkland in Kings Park, the most visited tourist attraction in the centre of Perth. The fire is suspected to have been deliberately lit.

=== February ===
New South Wales

On 2 February 2009 a lightning strike from a thunderstorm in the area started a bushfire approximately ten kilometres from Barmedman, the New South Wales Rural Fire Service declared a Section 44 for the bushfire at 3am AEDT 3 February 2009. The fire burnt on private property and burnt approximately 320 hectares of scrub.

Victoria
7 February (Black Saturday)

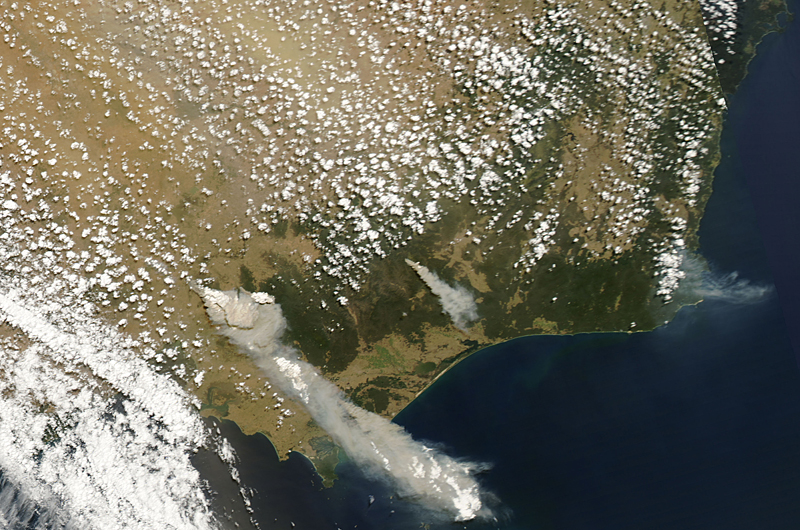
A satellite image of smoke and pyrocumulus cloud over eastern Victoria on 7 February.

On 7 February, Victoria experienced the worst fire day conditions on record. Several locations recorded the highest temperatures since records began over 150 years ago, including Melbourne which recorded a temperature of 46.4 °C, the hottest ever recorded in an Australian capital city. The dry conditions and high temperatures were paired with strong wind gusts of 100–120 km/h and by mid afternoon hundreds of fires were burning throughout the state. Small spot and grass fires burnt in various locations throughout the Greater Melbourne area, with many outlying suburbs/towns being affected by fires, particularly to the east and northeast. 173 people died and 414 were injured. 3,500+ buildings were destroyed including 2,029 houses. 7,562 people were displaced. Areas most affected included Kinglake, Marysville and surrounding areas, many areas in Western Victoria and towns south and southeast of Morwell in West Gippsland. The fires burnt 450,000+ hectares of land across Victoria in total.

Yarra Flats

On 12 February, a small fire ignited near the Main Yarra Trail in the Yarra Flats Park, on the western banks of the Yarra River and south of the Banksia Street Bridge, well within the Greater Melbourne area. The fire burnt between 3–5 hectares of grassland. Smoke from the fires carried north-west over Heidelberg and the northern suburbs of Melbourne.

Belgrave / Tecoma

On 15 February, Ferny Creek, Sherbrooke, Kallista, Tecoma and Belgrave residents were warned by the CFA to remain alert due to a 5-hectare fire in the Belgrave / Tecoma area. This was quickly contained without homes being threatened, though residents in those areas were warned of possible ember attack.

23 February bushfires

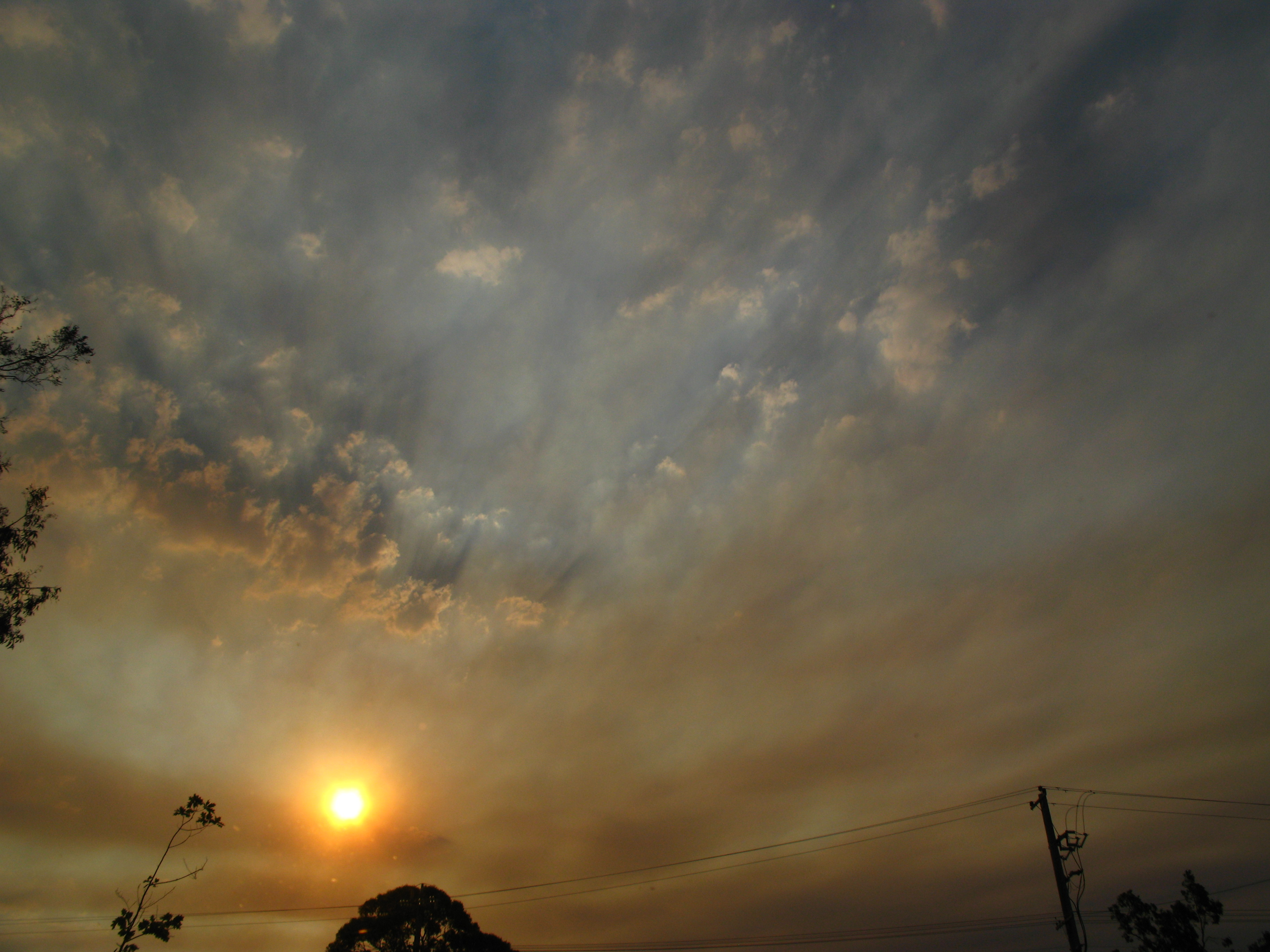
Smoke from the southern Dandenongs and Daylesford fires over Melbourne on 23 February

On 23 February, precipitated by erratic wind conditions and high temperatures, new fires were ignited at various locations around Victoria. New major fires included:

- Upwey / Lysterfield / Belgrave South

Started in the southern Dandenong Ranges on the southern perimeter of Upwey, quickly spreading in a south-easterly direction through the Lysterfield Park and into parts of Belgrave South and Belgrave Heights including part of Birdsland park (where the Ash Wednesday fire had originated in 1983). A CFA fire truck was destroyed, another damaged and several firefighters admitted to hospital with minor injuries. No homes were lost, but at least 1 building and further structures are suspected to have been damaged or destroyed.

- Daylesford

New fires started south of Daylesford that burnt over 2,000 hectares, with wind carrying ash as far as Gisborne.

- Yarram-Napier Road fire

A fire began near Yarram and entered the Mullundong forest.

Western Australia

On 23 February fire broke out near Mundijong, which threatened 40 houses and burnt 18 hectares. It was contained in five hours.

=== March ===
Victoria

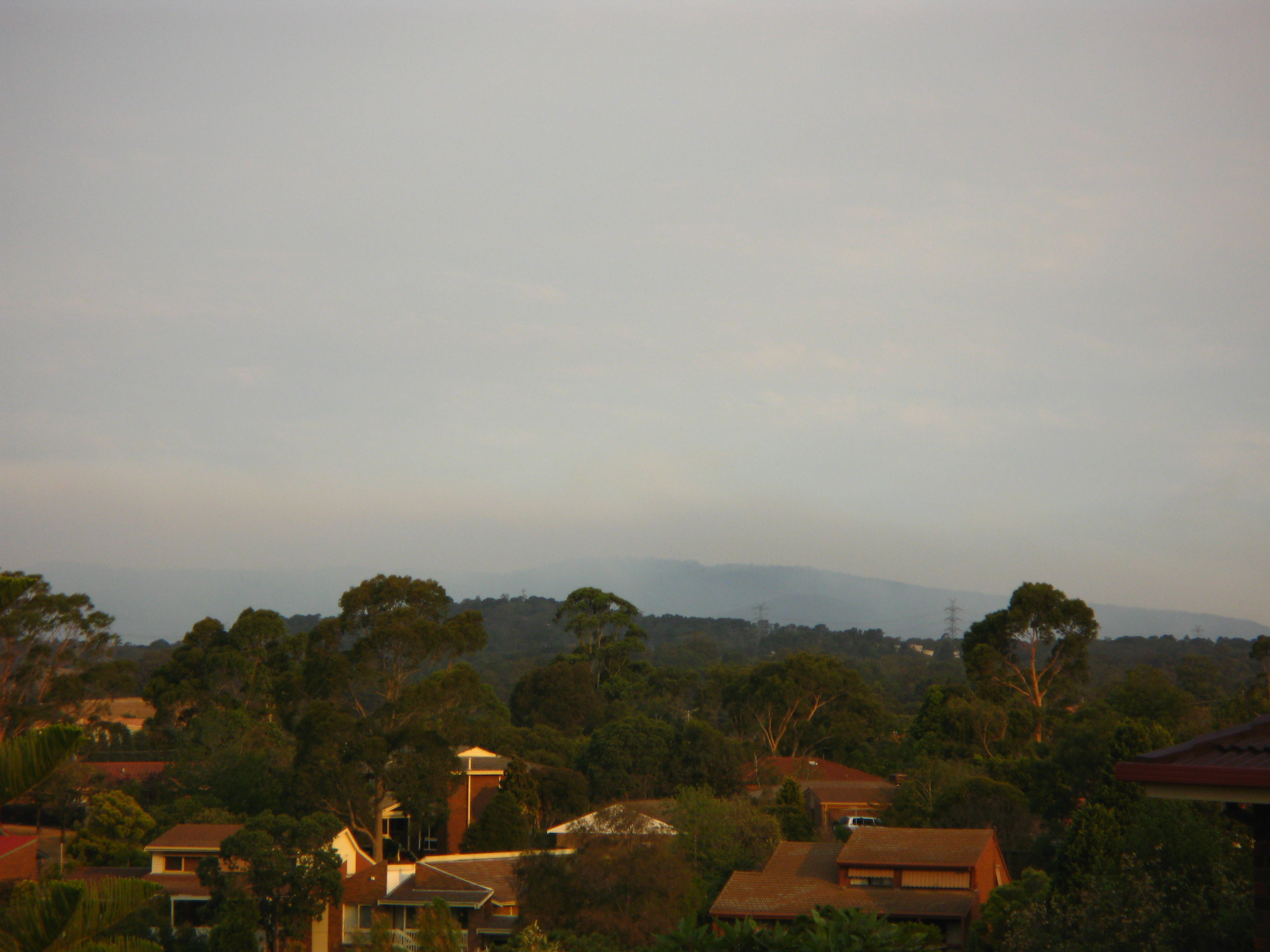
The southern Dandenong Ranges bushfires, 23 February 2009.

On 2 March, in anticipation and to create awareness of the extreme bushfire weather conditions predicted for the following days, many residents around Victoria received an SMS messages warning of the extreme fire danger conditions, from Victoria Police to Victorians with mobile phones as a technology trial. The message that read: Msg from Vic Police:Extreme weather in Vic expected Mon night & Tues. High wind & fire risk. Listen to local ACB Radio for emergency updates. Do not reply to this. The message was sent to around 3–5 million phones throughout Victoria.

On 3 March, despite early rain across several parts of the state and the temperature predictions were downgraded from mid 30s to high 20s, however the wind conditions remained as predicted. Several new fires began around the state, the majority of which were small and able to be contained or extinguished quickly. A fire began near Dereel began sometime around 2-3pm and the CFA subsequently released an urgent threat message for communities in the immediate area as the fire has been fanned by strong northerly winds. The fire rating index was 170 as of 5pm. Emergency services received more than 300 calls, 56% of which were for fallen trees. Over 10,000 residents, particularly in southwestern and southeastern Victoria, lost power.

From 4–6 March, favourable conditions including cooler temperatures and rain, enabled fire crews to contain and control many of the fires, including the major fires that started on 7 February. By mid March, many of the fires were extinguished completely.

On Sunday 22 March, lightning sparked several small fires in Victoria's east, mostly centred around Cann River. These are in mostly remote sections of forest and currently pose no threat to any communities.

Western Australia

On 17 March, an estimated 20 hectares fire, the cause of the fire hasn't been confirmed, occurred in the Dunsborough-Yallingup area, threatening homes and closing roads.
