= 2009 southeastern Australia heat wave =

Weather event in Australia

Meteorological history
- Duration: 25 January – 8 February 2009
- Heat event
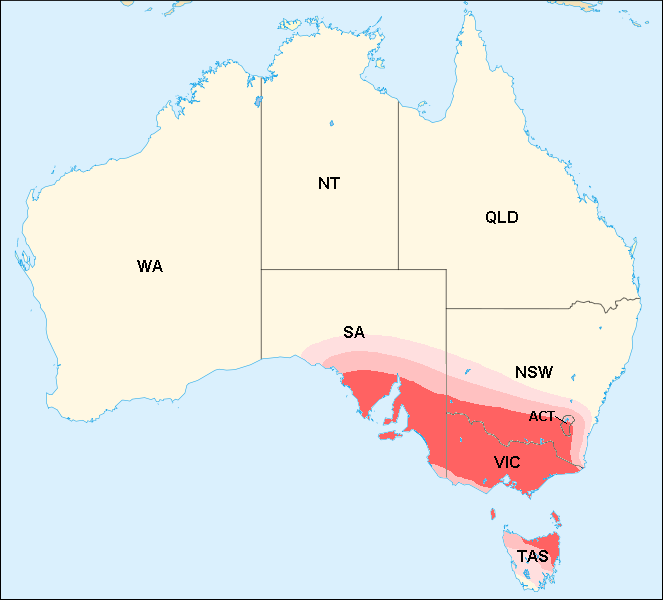
- Approximate affected area shown in red
- Max temp: 48.8 °C (119.8 °F), recorded at Hopetoun, Victoria on 7 February 2009

Overall effects
- Fatalities: 374
- Areas affected: South Australia, Victoria, Southern New South Wales, Northern Tasmania, ACT

The 2009 southeastern Australia heat wave was a heat wave that lasted from 25 January to 8 February and led to record-breaking prolonged high temperatures in the region. The heat wave is considered one of the, if not the, most extreme in the region's history. During the heat wave, fifty separate locations set various records for consecutive, highest daytime and overnight temperatures. The highest temperature recorded during the heat wave was 48.8 °C (119.8 °F) in Hopetoun, Victoria, a record for the state that stood until 2026. Many locations through the region recorded all-time high temperatures including capital cities Adelaide, which reached its third-highest temperature, 45.7 °C (114.3 °F), and Melbourne, which recorded its highest-ever temperature on record, 46.4 °C (115.5 °F). Both cities broke records for the most consecutive days over 40 °C (104 °F), while Mildura, Victoria recorded an all-time record twelve consecutive days over 43 °C (109 °F).

The exceptional heat wave was caused by a slow-moving high-pressure system that settled over the Tasman Sea, with a combination of an intense tropical low located off the North West Australian coast and a monsoon trough over Northern Australia, which produced ideal conditions for hot tropical air to be directed down over southeastern Australia. The heat began in South Australia on 25 January but became more widespread over southeast Australia by 27 January. A weak cool change moved over the southern coastal areas bringing some relief on 30 January, including Melbourne, where the change arrived that evening, dropping temperatures to an average of 30.8 °C (87.4 °F). Higher temperatures returned on the following weekend with Melbourne recording its hottest day since records began in 1855, 46.4 °C (115.5 °F).

The heat wave generated extreme fire conditions during the peak of the 2008–09 Australian bushfire season, causing many bushfires in the affected region, contributing to the extreme bushfire conditions on 7 February, also known as the Black Saturday bushfires, which claimed 173 lives in Victoria.

== Cause ==
The heat wave was caused by a slow-moving high-pressure system that settled over the Tasman Sea. Coupled with an intense tropical low and a monsoon trough over Northern Australia, this produced hot, tropical air to be directed over southeastern Australia, raising temperatures significantly. The CSIRO stated that "The warm lower tropospheric anticyclone is the key synoptic weather system responsible for the heat-waves." The heat wave was the worst in Australia's history.

== Records and statistics ==
During the heat wave, several records were broken; Tasmania recorded its highest-ever temperature; 42.2 °C (108 °F) in Scamander, and the long-standing Tasmanian record of 40.8 °C (105.4 °F) (recorded in Hobart on 4 January 1976) was broken five times within two days at Flinders Island, Fingal (twice), St Helens and Scamander, while Hopetoun in Victoria recorded the highest temperature of the heat wave, 48.8 °C (119.8 °F), which was a state record until 2026.

=== Adelaide, South Australia ===
- Average daily maximum 27 January – 7 February: 40.5 °C (104.9 °F) – (11.1 °C (20.0 °F) above average)
- 13 Consecutive days over 33 °C (91 °F)
- 6 Consecutive days over 40 °C (104 °F)
- 4 Consecutive days over 43 °C (109 °F)

=== Melbourne, Victoria ===
- Average daily maximum 27 January – 7 February: 35.9 °C (96.6 °F) – (10.1 °C (18.2 F) above average)
- 12 Consecutive days over 28 °C (82 °F)
- 5 Consecutive days over 30 °C (86 °F)
- 3 Consecutive days over 43 °C (109 °F)

=== Mildura, Victoria ===
- 12 Consecutive days over 40 °C (104 °F)
- 5 Consecutive days over 42 °C (108 °F)

=== Wagga Wagga, New South Wales ===
- 14 Consecutive days over 35 °C (95 °F)
- 13 Consecutive days over 37.8 °C (100.0 °F)
- 4 Consecutive days over 40 °C (104 °F)

== Temperatures (daily maximum) ==
=== Avalon, Victoria ===
January 2009

- 27th – 32.9 °C (91.2 °F)
- 28th – 41.9 °C (107.4 °F)
- 29th – 45.8 °C (114.4 °F)
- 30th – 45.0 °C (113.0 °F)

February

- 7th – 47.9 °C (118.2 °F) (record high, 2.1 °C higher than previous record)

=== Ceduna, South Australia ===
January 2009

- 27th – 44.8 °C (112.6 °F)
- 28th – 47.5 °C (117.5 °F)
- 29th – 42.3 °C (108.1 °F)
- 30th – 39.3 °C (102.7 °F)
- 31st – 42.9 °C (109.2 °F)

February

- 1st – 41.1 °C (106.0 °F)
- 2nd – 34.1 °C (93.4 °F)
- 3rd – 32.1 °C (89.8 °F)
- 4th – 41.5 °C (106.7 °F)
- 5th – 31.7 °C (89.1 °F)
- 6th – 46.4 °C (115.5 °F)

=== Mildura, Victoria ===
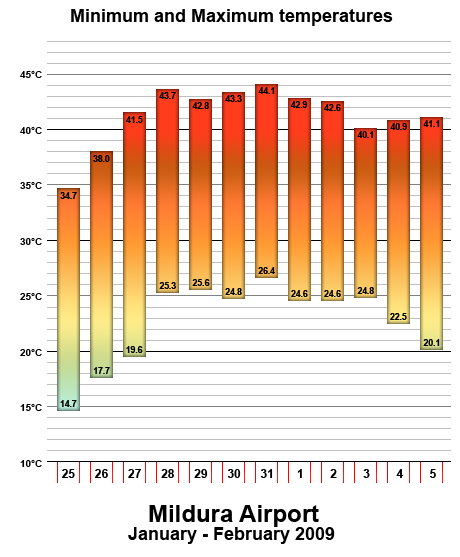
A graph of the minimum and maximum temperatures recorded in Mildura, Victoria at the airport

January 2009

- 26th – 38.0 °C (100.4 °F)
- 27th – 41.5 °C (106.7 °F)
- 28th – 43.7 °C (110.7 °F)
- 29th – 42.8 °C (109.0 °F)
- 30th – 43.3 °C (109.9 °F)
- 31st – 44.1 °C (111.4 °F)

February

- 1st – 42.9 °C (109.2 °F)
- 2nd – 42.6 °C (108.7 °F)
- 3rd – 40.1 °C (104.2 °F)
- 4th – 40.9 °C (105.6 °F)
- 5th – 41.1 °C (106.0 °F)
- 6th – 43.1 °C (109.6 °F)
- 7th – 46.7 °C (116.1 °F) – 12th consecutive day over 40 °C
- 8th – 34.6 °C (94.3 °F)

=== Deniliquin, New South Wales ===
January 2009

- 26th – 37.8 °C (100.0 °F)
- 27th – 39.5 °C (103.1 °F)
- 28th – 43.0 °C (109.4 °F)
- 29th – 42.7 °C (108.9 °F)
- 30th – 44.5 °C (112.1 °F)
- 31st – 44.2 °C (111.6 °F)

February

- 1st – 43.0 °C (109.4 °F)
- 2nd – 38.3 °C (100.9 °F)
- 3rd – 38.2 °C (100.8 °F)
- 4th – 39.2 °C (102.6 °F)
- 5th – 42.1 °C (107.8 °F)
- 6th – 41.5 °C (106.7 °F)
- 7th – 46.6 °C (115.9 °F)

=== Swan Hill, Victoria ===
January 2009

- 26th – 37.7 °C (99.9 °F)
- 27th – 40.8 °C (105.4 °F)
- 28th – 43.8 °C (110.8 °F)
- 29th – 43.4 °C (110.1 °F)
- 30th – 44.6 °C (112.3 °F)
- 31st – 44.5 °C (112.1 °F)

February

- 1st – 43.0 °C (109.4 °F)
- 2nd – 40.8 °C (105.4 °F)
- 3rd – 38.3 °C (100.9 °F)
- 4th – 40.0 °C (104.0 °F)
- 5th – 42.5 °C (108.5 °F)
- 6th – 42.6 °C (108.7 °F)
- 7th – 46.6 °C (115.9 °F)

=== Melbourne, Victoria ===
Temperatures have been recorded since 1855.

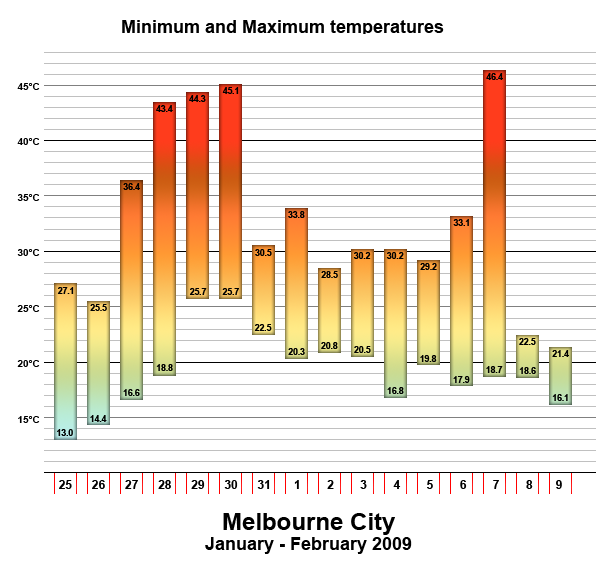
Temperature graph for Melbourne during the peak of the heatwave.

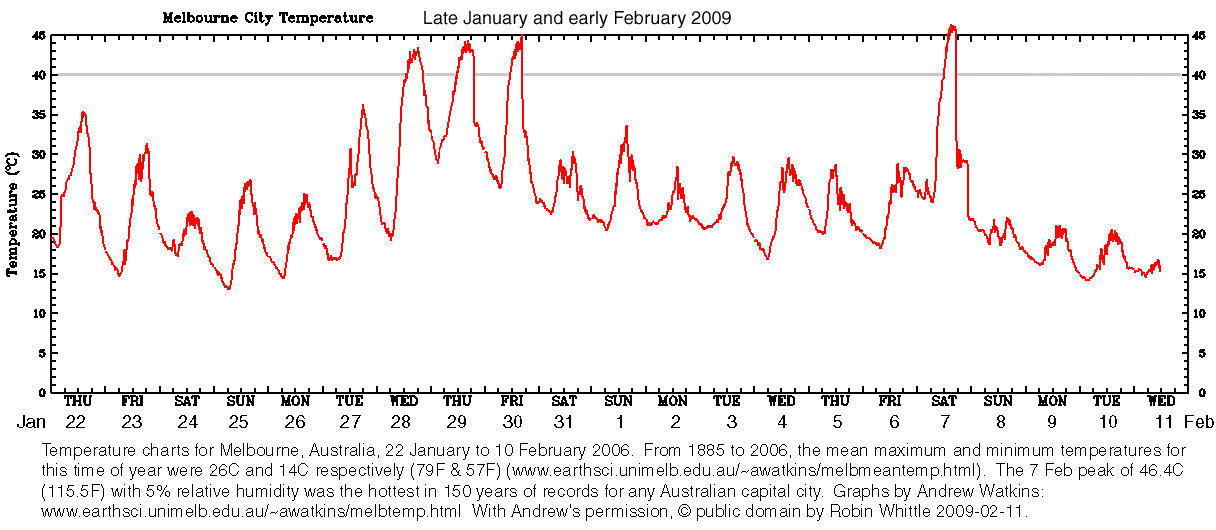
Detailed temperature graph for Melbourne during the peak of the heatwave.

January 2009

- 27th – 36.4 °C (97.5 °F)
- 28th – 43.4 °C (110.1 °F)
- 29th – 44.3 °C (111.7 °F)
- 30th – 45.1 °C (113.2 °F) – Third-hottest day recorded in Melbourne.
- 31st – 30.5 °C (86.9 °F)

February

- 1st – 33.8 °C (92.8 °F)
- 2nd – 28.5 °C (83.3 °F)
- 3rd – 30.2 °C (86.4 °F)
- 4th – 30.2 °C (86.4 °F)
- 5th – 29.2 °C (84.6 °F)
- 6th – 33.1 °C (91.6 °F)
- 7th – 46.4 °C (115.5 °F) – Hottest day recorded in Melbourne 0.8 °C hotter than previous record (Friday, 13 January 1939).

=== Adelaide, South Australia ===
January 2009

- 26th – 36.6 °C (97.9 °F)
- 27th – 43.2 °C (109.8 °F)
- 28th – 45.7 °C (114.3 °F)
- 29th – 43.4 °C (110.1 °F)
- 30th – 43.1 °C (109.6 °F)
- 31st – 41.1 °C (106.0 °F)

February

- 1st – 40.6 °C (105.1 °F)
- 2nd – 38.8 °C (101.8 °F)
- 3rd – 36.3 °C (97.3 °F)
- 4th – 33.0 °C (91.4 °F)
- 5th – 35.6 °C (96.1 °F)
- 6th – 43.9 °C (111.0 °F)
- 7th – 41.5 °C (106.7 °F)

A record-high minimum temperature was recorded at around midnight on 29 January, when the temperature dropped to only 33.9 °C (93.0 °F) at the Bureau of Meteorology weather station in Kent Town, near the Adelaide city centre. Temperatures recorded in other parts of the city and other towns throughout South Australia were even higher.

=== Woomera, South Australia ===
January 2009

- 25th – 37.9 °C (100.2 °F)
- 26th – 39.9 °C (103.8 °F)
- 27th – 43.8 °C (110.8 °F)
- 28th – 44.6 °C (112.3 °F)
- 29th – 42.3 °C (108.1 °F)
- 30th – 42.4 °C (108.3 °F)
- 31st – 41.9 °C (107.4 °F)

February

- 1st – 41.7 °C (107.1 °F)
- 2nd – 43.5 °C (110.3 °F)
- 3rd – 43.7 °C (110.7 °F)
- 4th – 42.5 °C (108.5 °F)
- 5th – 42.8 °C (109.0 °F)
- 6th – 45.6 °C (114.1 °F)
- 7th – 46.2 °C (115.2 °F)

=== Wagga Wagga, New South Wales ===
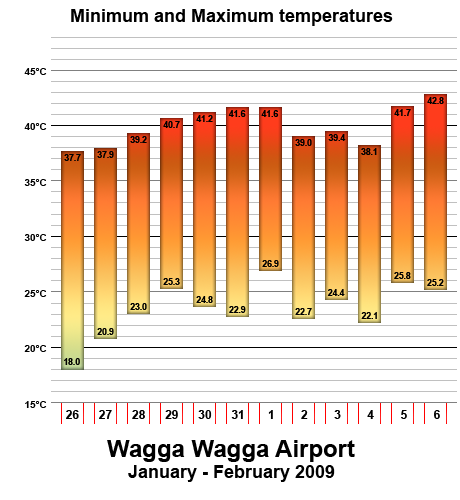
Graph of minimum and maximum temperatures recorded at the Wagga Wagga Airport.

January 2009

- 26th – 37.7 °C (99.9 °F)
- 27th – 37.9 °C (100.2 °F)
- 28th – 39.2 °C (102.6 °F)
- 29th – 40.7 °C (105.3 °F)
- 30th – 41.2 °C (106.2 °F)
- 31st – 41.6 °C (106.9 °F)

February

- 1st – 41.6 °C (106.9 °F)
- 2nd – 39.0 °C (102.2 °F)
- 3rd – 39.4 °C (102.9 °F)
- 4th – 38.1 °C (100.6 °F)
- 5th – 41.7 °C (107.1 °F)
- 6th – 42.8 °C (109.0 °F)
- 7th – 45.2 °C (113.4 °F) – Hottest day recorded in Wagga Wagga since records began in 1941.
- 8th – 42.7 °C (108.9 °F)

On 31 January 2009, Wagga Wagga broke the all-time January record for the most days above 40.0 °C (104.0 °F) with six days recorded (the record previously being five days, which was set in 1952 and equalled in 1979 and 2001). The January record set in 1979 was equalled for number of days above 35.0 °C (95.0 °F) or more which is 19 days.

Wagga Wagga broke the all-time record and the February record for the highest recorded maximum on 7 February 2009, 2:50pm AEDT the city recorded 45.2 °C (113.4 °F) with the previous February record being 44.6 °C (112.3 °F) set on 1 February 1968 and the all time previously being 44.8 °C (112.6 °F) set on 23 January 2001.

On 8 February 2009, the record for consecutive days over 37.8 °C (100.0 °F) was broken with thirteen consecutive days recorded (the previous record being six days, which was set in 1946 and equalled in 1979, 1980 and 2004). Wagga Wagga also recorded fourteen consecutive days of over 35.0 °C (95.0 °F).

=== Albury–Wodonga, NSW/VIC ===
January 2009

- 26th – 38.4 °C (101.1 °F)
- 27th – 38.2 °C (100.8 °F)
- 28th – 40.7 °C (105.3 °F)
- 29th – 41.5 °C (106.7 °F)
- 30th – 42.9 °C (109.2 °F)
- 31st – 42.7 °C (108.9 °F)

February

- 1st – 43.1 °C (109.6 °F)
- 2nd – 38.3 °C (100.9 °F)
- 3rd – 37.7 °C (99.9 °F)
- 4th – 36.9 °C (98.4 °F)
- 5th – 41.2 °C (106.2 °F)
- 6th – 42.2 °C (108.0 °F)
- 7th – 44.8 °C (112.6 °F) – Hottest day recorded in Albury–Wodonga since records began in 1973.
- 8th – 40.2 °C (104.4 °F)

=== Ballarat, Victoria ===
January 2009

- 28th – 40.0 °C (104.0 °F)
- 29th – 41.4 °C (106.5 °F)
- 30th – 41.1 °C (106.0 °F)

February

- 7th – 44.1 °C (111.4 °F) (record-high, 2.1 °C higher than previous record)

=== Canberra, ACT ===
January 2009

- 28th – 34.8 °C (94.6 °F)
- 29th – 37.0 °C (98.6 °F)
- 30th – 37.2 °C (99.0 °F)
- 31st – 38.2 °C (100.8 °F)

February

- 1st – 31.9 °C (89.4 °F)
- 2nd – 34.7 °C (94.5 °F)
- 3rd – 31.0 °C (87.8 °F)
- 4th – 33.8 °C (92.8 °F)
- 5th – 37.4 °C (99.3 °F)
- 6th – 39.6 °C (103.3 °F)
- 7th – 40.0 °C (104.0 °F)
- 8th – 40.0 °C (104.0 °F)

=== Launceston, Tasmania ===
January 2009

- 28th – 33.8 °C (92.8 °F)
- 29th – 36.9 °C (98.4 °F)
- 30th – 39.0 °C (102.2 °F) – Hottest day recorded in Launceston since records began in 1980.
- 31st – 38.2 °C (100.8 °F)

== Accompanying bushfires ==
After a slow start to the 2008–09 Australian bushfire season, the high temperatures and wind precipitated several bushfires across Victoria and South Australia. The conditions were very similar to the heat wave experienced in early January 1939, which killed 438 people and precipitated the Black Friday bushfires of 1939.

Fires were also started in the Australian Alps by lightning strikes from dry thunderstorms in north-east Victoria and south-east New South Wales.

The tail end of the heat wave also precipitated the Black Saturday bushfires, in which 173 people died, 414 injured and 2,029 houses destroyed at various locations across the state. Several locations around the state recorded their highest temperatures since records began in 1859 and winds gusted up to 110 km/h.

== Comparison to normal climate for the area ==
Many areas in central South Australia, northern Victoria and inland New South Wales regularly experience temperatures over 40 °C (104 °F) for one, two or three consecutive days, sometimes more, during the summer months. During the heat wave, however, many of these regions experienced temperatures over 40 °C (104 °F) for twice as long or more, on average, than is normal for that time of year. Coastal regions and the ACT experienced slightly lower temperatures; however, these were still above average and lasted for a prolonged period.

While coastal regions may have experienced shorter periods of heat wave, for the time that they did experience temperatures over 35 °C (95 °F), they mostly reached the top 3, top 5 or top 10 all-time temperature records for a number of days.

The heat wave was perhaps most extreme in northern and eastern Tasmania, where 7 of the 8 highest temperatures recorded in Tasmania up to that time occurred during the heat wave.

A chart of the variation of maximum and minimum daily temperatures, through the year, for Melbourne was prepared from observations between May 1855 and August 2006. For early February, this shows a mean daily maximum temperature of 26 °C (79 °F) with the 75th-percentile temperature being about 31 °C (88 °F).

== Effects ==
=== Energy ===
Localised power outages occurred throughout both cities during the week at varying times for various lengths. It is estimated that over 500,000 residents in Melbourne were without power for the evening of 30 January 2009. The outage affected much of central Melbourne with train and tram services cancelled, the evacuation of Crown Casino, traffic light failures, people being rescued from lifts and patrons of the Victorian Arts Centre evacuated and shows cancelled. The outage occurred only an hour after the National Electricity Market Management Company (NEMMCO) issued a statement saying load shedding was ending and power had been restored.

Blackouts also occurred in the city's west, caused by the three-day heat wave. It is believed an explosion at South Morang contributed to the power problems along three transmission lines supplying Victoria's west and Victorian power supplier SP AusNet shed 1,000 megawatts. On the 30th, Energy Minister Peter Batchelor announced consumers who lose power for more than 20 hours would be eligible for compensation.

Areas that did not experience blackouts still had problems with abnormally low voltage (probably due to increased air-conditioner usage).

As of 1 February, the heat wave is estimated to have cost the Victorian economy $100m during the week.

=== Transport ===
Over the course of the week, thousands of train and tram services were cancelled in both cities, with more than 1,300 individual train services cancelled in metropolitan Melbourne alone. The cancellations were due to buckling rail lines, air conditioner failures and power outages. On the 30th, all public transport in the city was free as the government admitted responsibility for failing to provide adequate infrastructure elements to cope with the heat, as well as long-standing issues with underfunding. On the 30th, 730 (40%) of rail services were cancelled, the worst day of operation since Connex took control in 2004.

=== 2009 Australian Open ===
Several outdoor matches during the 2009 Australian Open on the 29th and the 30th were cancelled due to the heat. A number of players, including number 3 seed Novak Djokovic, cited the temperature as reason for withdrawing from matches. Serena Williams was quoted as saying it was so hot on court she felt like she was having an "out-of-body experience". After these retirements and an intensification in the heat, the organisers responded by closing the roof and allowing players longer breaks and icepacks.

=== Human health ===
There is dispute between sources as to how many people were affected by the heat wave. Hundreds were treated for heat-related illness and 6 fatalities were confirmed, and a number of "sudden deaths" were suspected to be caused by the heat. Authorities worked through each case to determine exactly how many fatalities were directly attributable to the heat wave.

Commercial news sources vary widely at the number of fatalities, some report only 2 deaths, while others speculate that the toll may ultimately be higher. Fifty-seven deaths were suspected to have occurred in South Australia and 33 in Victoria, however authorities preferred to wait for coronial reports before confirming how many were directly attributable to the heat wave.

The Victorian state coroner announced a tripling of dead bodies being placed in the state mortuary during the heat wave, filling the morgue to capacity. Hospitals and funeral homes were relied upon to provide temporary storage of corpses, even before the deaths associated with the Black Saturday bushfires created additional demand for mortuary space.

Throughout the heat wave, thousands of people, many of them elderly, were confirmed to have been treated by ambulance officers and placed in hospitals for heat-related illnesses in Victoria and South Australia. Ambulance Victoria reported a 70% increase in emergency calls during the week. It is estimated that around 2,000 people across Victoria and South Australia were treated for heat stroke and other effects of the heat wave.

According to a Monash University study of funeral notices, more than 200 people died as a result of the heat wave. A 45% increase in the death rate was noted during the time. A subsequent report by Victoria's chief health officer, Dr John Carnie, put the final figure at 374.

=== Fauna and flora ===
Baby birds, possums and bats were among the wildlife not coping in the extreme heat. The RSPCA received five times the usual number of admissions to its shelters in Melbourne, with 50 possums admitted to the Burwood East shelter alone.

There were many reports of koalas wandering into urban yards and houses to drink water offered by residents. This behaviour is highly unusual as the animals do not normally drink water and are naturally shy of people.

In Melbourne, a city where most trees are non-native, notably the plane trees that line many inner and middle suburban streets, deciduous trees began shedding their leaves by early February, creating the appearance of an early autumn. Water restrictions meant many trees and plants were already stressed, and some street trees and trees in parks where councils had not arranged special watering, died, or suffered die back, as did trees and plants in private gardens.

== See also ==
- Extreme weather events in Melbourne
- 2008–09 Australian bushfire season
- Black Saturday bushfires

Other notable Australian heat waves:

- Black Friday bushfires – 438 deaths
- 1895–96, southeastern states – 437 deaths
- 1907–08, southeastern states – 246 deaths
- 2024 Australia heat wave
