= Adelaide Hills bushfires =

1939 series of bushfires in South Australia

Coordinates: 34.809681°S 138.65334°E

The Adelaide Hills bushfires of 1939 were a series of bushfires in the Adelaide Hills, South Australia, that burned from 10 to 14 January. There had been ample rain during the winter of 1938 resulting in heavy understorey, but drought set in toward the end of the year. A heatwave in early January 1939 ensured the fuel load was very dry and particularly susceptible to fire. The fires were finally extinguished when thunderstorms arrived during Saturday evening of 14 January.

Damage was assessed at £650,000, including the destruction of ninety houses. There were no deaths, but the fire highlighted the inadequacy of South Australia's fire-fighting capability. Six thousand city volunteers had helped to combat the fires, using mainly branches and wet bags. As a result, the Emergency Fire Service was set up, the precursor to the modern Country Fire Service.

== See also ==
- Black Friday (1939)
