= Black Thursday bushfires =

Series of wildfires which destroyed large areas of Victoria State, Australia, in 1851

- Date: 6 February 1851
- Location: Victoria, Australia

Impacts
- Deaths: 12
- Livestock lost: over 1,000,000

Ignition
- Cause: Heat wave, careless burning

The Black Thursday bushfires were a devastating series of fires that swept the Port Phillip District (now the state of Victoria) in Australia, on 6 February 1851, burning up 5 million hectares (12 million acres; 50,000 square kilometres; 19,000 square miles), or about a quarter of the state's area. (Note: Fires covered a quarter of what is now Victoria. This spans approximately 5 million hectares) Twelve people died, along with one million sheep, thousands of cattle and countless native animals.

"The temperature became torrid, and on the morning of the 6th of February 1851, the air which blew down from the north resembled the breath of a furnace. A fierce wind arose, gathering strength and velocity from hour to hour, until about noon it blew with the violence of a tornado. By some inexplicable means it wrapped the whole country in a sheet of flame – fierce, awful, and irresistible."

— Andrew Garran (editor), Picturesque Atlas of Australasia, 1886

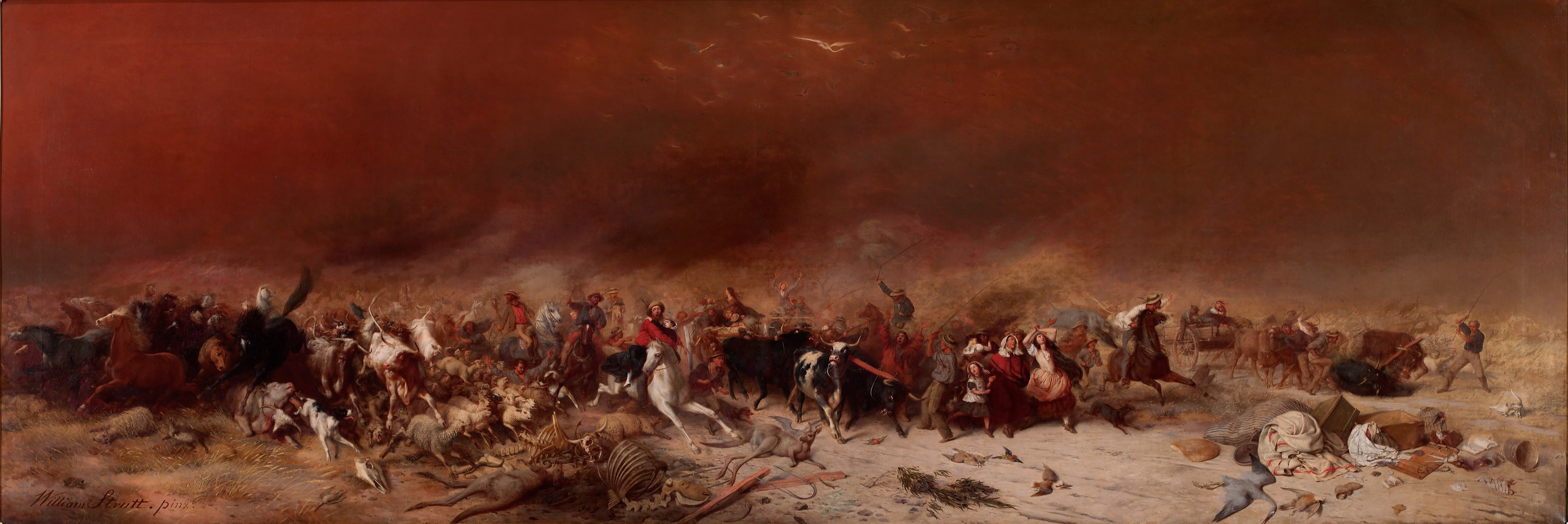
Black Thursday, February 6th. 1851, as depicted by William Strutt in 1864

== Causes ==
The Black Thursday bushfires were caused in part by an intense drought that occurred throughout 1850 when the continent suffered from extreme heat. On 6 February 1851, a strong furnace-like wind came down from the north and gained power and speed as the hours passed. It is believed that the disaster began in Plenty Ranges when a couple of bullock drivers left logs burning unattended, which set fire to long, dry grass affected by the recent drought. The year preceding the fires was exceptionally hot and dry and this trend continued into 1851.

== Conditions and progress ==
The weather reached record extremes. By eleven it was about 47 °C (117 °F) in the shade. The air cooled to 43 °C (109 °F) by one o'clock and rose to 45 °C (113 °F) around four o’clock. Survivors claimed the air was so full of smoke and heat that their lungs seemed to collapse. The air was so dark it made the roads seem bright. Pastures and plains became shrivelled wastelands: water-holes disappeared, creeks dried up, and trees turned into combustible timber. Clouds of smoke filled the air; forests and ranges became one large "sheet of flames". The hot north wind was so strong that thick black smoke reached northern Tasmania, creating a murky mist, resembling a combination of smoke and fog. Homes, crops and gardens were consumed by the rushing fire leaving a quarter of Victoria in a heap of desolate ruins. The community fled to water to escape the suffocating air around them, returning after everything was over to the sight of "blackened homesteads" and the charred bodies of animals that could not escape. The weather at sea was even "more fearful than on shore". The intense heat could be felt 32 km (20 mi) out to sea where a ship came under burning ember attack and was covered in cinders and dust.

Eventually, a southerly breeze and light rain cooled the surface.

== Consequences and responses ==
I write only what I have seen, I might mention that pigs and dogs running loose were burned to death – birds were dropping down off the trees before the fire in all directions – opossums, kangaroos, and all sorts of beasts can be had today ready roasted all over the bush. Fully one half of the timber in this neighbourhood has been burned or blown down, and all the grass has been burnt.

The catastrophic fire caused the loss of human life, cattle, and land for miles and affected many regions including Portland, Plenty Ranges, Western Port, the Wimmera and Dandenong districts, Gippsland, and Mount Macedon. Farms across the region were destroyed, along with a number of settlements in Gippsland, Western Port, Geelong, Heidelberg and east to Diamond Creek and Dandenong. Three men from Mount Macedon died. Overall, the disaster resulted in the death of twelve people, one million sheep, and thousands of cattle over 60 to 80 kilometres (40 to 50 mi).

The initial response to the calamity was a public meeting held on 11 February 1851 at Geelong. The community came together to discuss relief efforts for those affected, especially for citizens who lost everything. To assist the poor, many even cancelled outstanding debts.

== Ecology ==
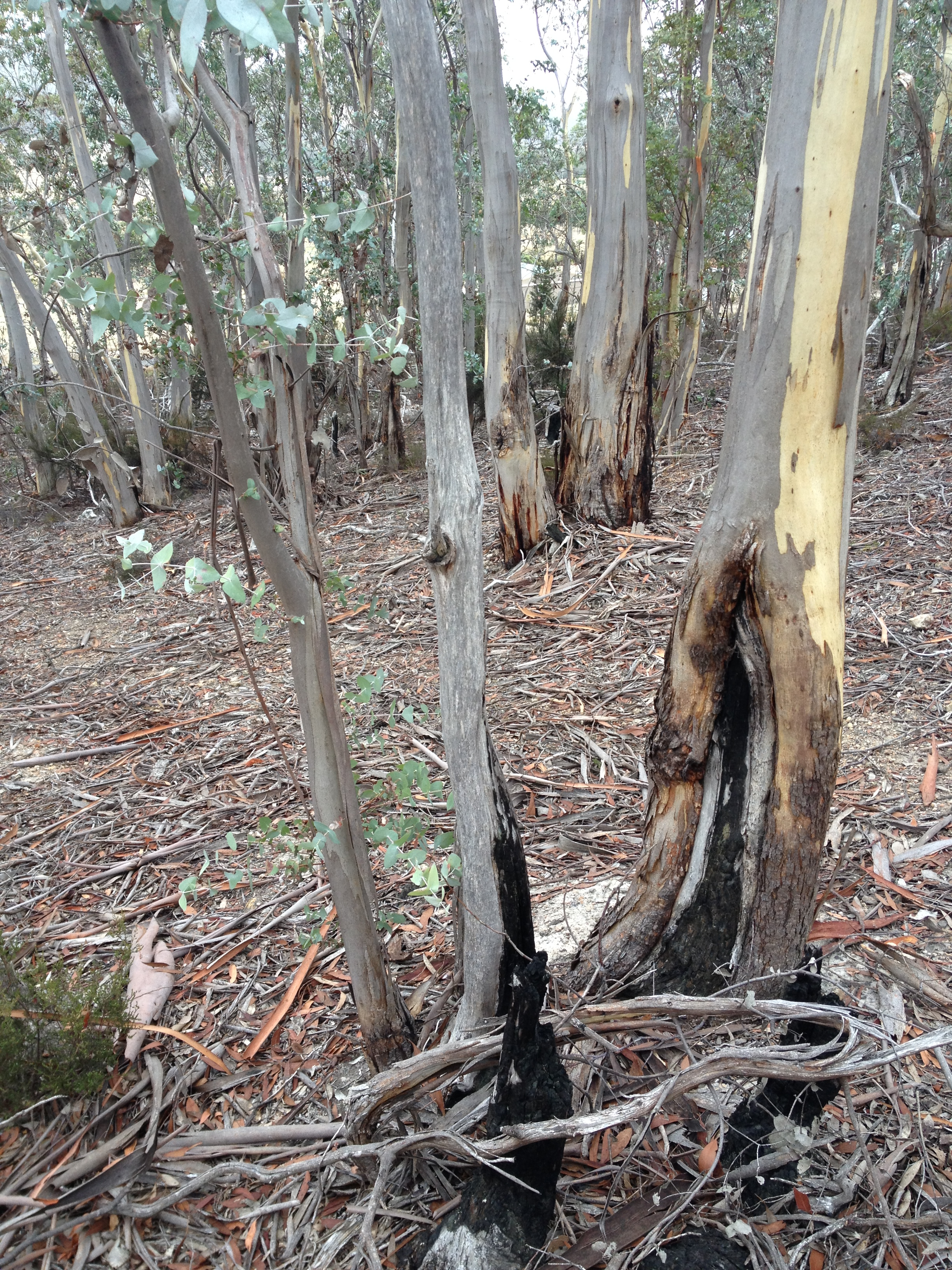
Burnt bases of Eucalyptus tenuiramis in dry sclerophyll forest

Intense bushfires are not uncommon in southern Australia. The region is one of the three most fire-prone in the world. Within the last two hundred years, the area has experienced and documented at least twenty-five major fires, beginning with Black Thursday in 1851. The intensity of these fires is due in part to natural fuels, such as sclerophyll forests in the region. While adapting to cope with drought and predators, the trees' leaves turn into prime fuel for fires. They become tough as protection from dry conditions and to increase the efficiency of nutrient use. They also develop tough spikes and chemicals to protect themselves from small animals. The leaves' tough surface allows them to last longer and build up on the forest floor and the chemical makes them flammable. The abundance of flammable fuel can cause an inferno with a single spark.

The area's disturbance regime has shaped the landscape by causing the plant communities to evolve and develop mechanisms to aid in speedy recovery. The native species of the Australian bush, for example, have developed post fire seed release and smoke exposure germination. Other plants, such as acacia, eucalyptus, and Monotoca elliptica have adapted to survive in dry, nutrient poor soil.

Acacia oncinocarpa and Eucalyptus miniata, for example, and perennial herbs all have adaptive mechanisms that enable them to live in fire-prone areas of Australia. Both the acacia (a small spreading shrub) and eucalyptus (an overstorey tree) can regenerate from seeds and vegetatively regenerate new shoots from buds that escape fire. Reproduction and seed fall occur during the eight dry months. Due to the area's frequent fires, the seeds are usually released onto a recently burnt seed bed.

Perennial herbs survive fire by avoidance. They make up the understorey and grow during seasons with lower temperatures and more rainfall. By dying back in the summer they avoid most fires. During a fire, they have a bulb or root mass that lives underground, and only the dead stems and leaves burn, so the plant survives and begins to grow again the following year.

== Popular culture ==
The bushfires were depicted in the 1954 novel The Fury.

== See also ==
- List of Black Thursdays
