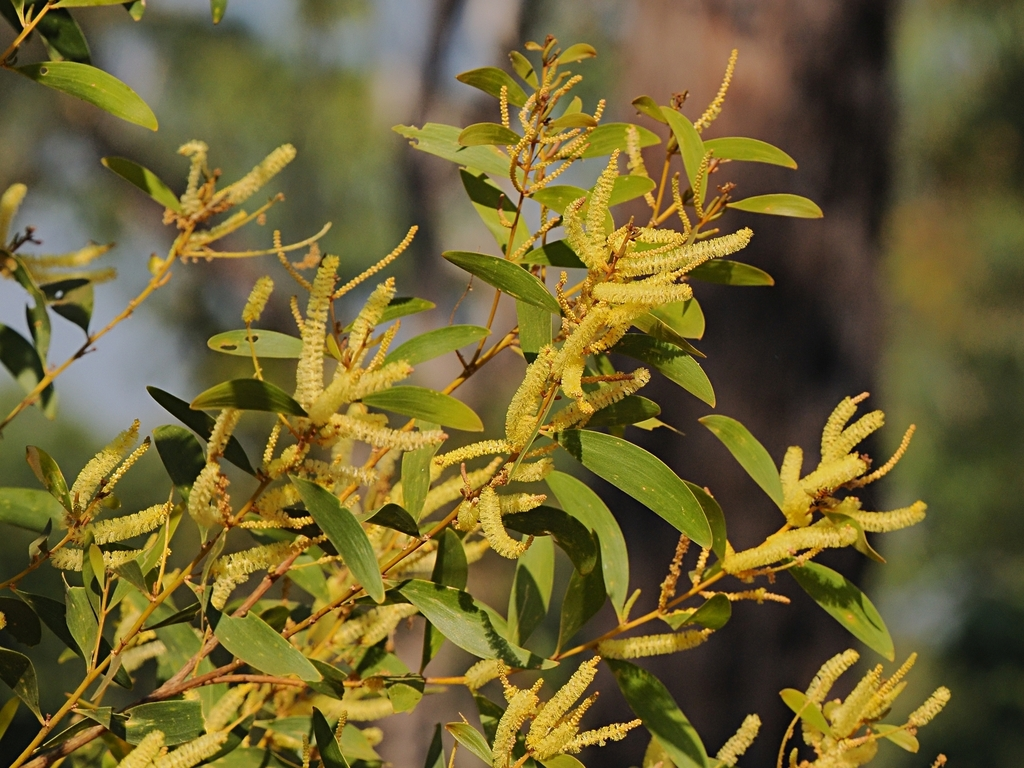
- Near Point Stuart

Scientific classification
- Kingdom: Plantae
- Clade: Tracheophytes
- Clade: Angiosperms
- Clade: Eudicots
- Clade: Rosids
- Order: Fabales
- Family: Fabaceae
- Subfamily: Caesalpinioideae
- Clade: Mimosoid clade
- Genus: Acacia
- Species: A. oncinocarpa

Binomial name
- Acacia oncinocarpa Benth.
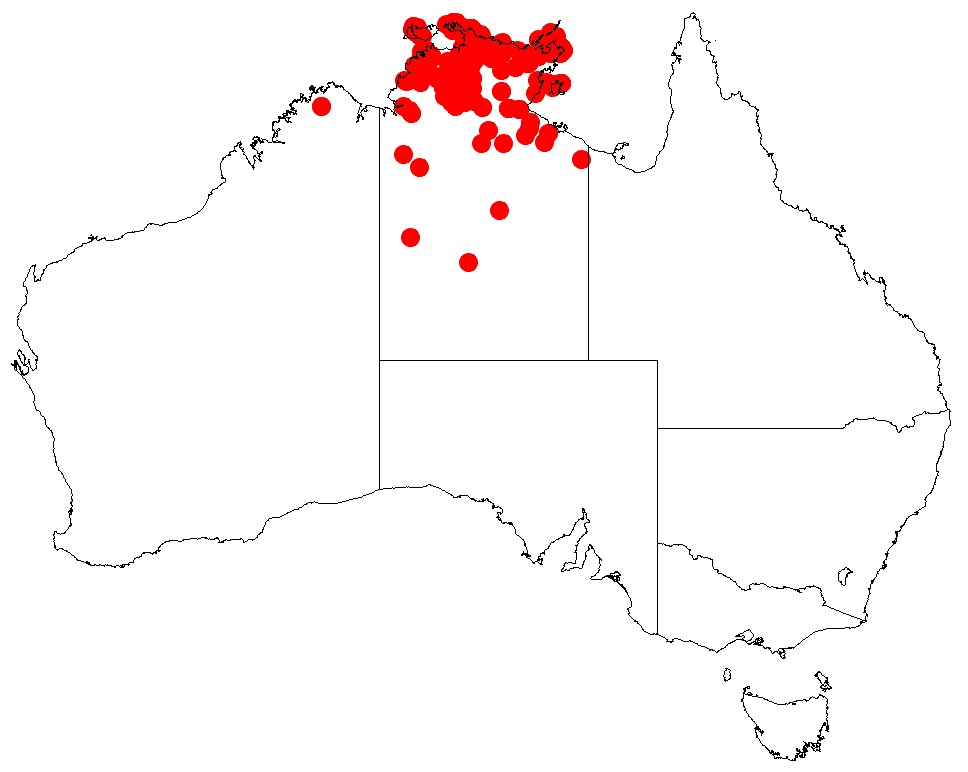
- Occurrence data from AVH

Synonyms
- Acacia loxocarpa Benth.; Acacia sp. aff. oncinocarpa (C.R.Michell 4200); Racosperma oncinocarpum (Benth.) Pedley

= Acacia oncinocarpa =

Species of legume

Acacia oncinocarpa is a species of flowering plant in the family Fabaceae, and is endemic to northern Australia. It is a rounded, resinous, sometimes prostrate shrub or tree with smooth bark, reddish brown, angular branchlets, narrowly elliptic to elliptic or narrowly lance-shaped, papery to leathery phyllodes, spikes of pale yellow to cream-coloured flowers and erect, very narrowly lance-shaped to linear, woody glabrous pods.

== Description ==
Acacia oncinocarpa is a rounded, resinous shrub or tree that typically grows to a height of 0.5–5 m (1 ft 8 in – 16 ft 5 in) and is prostrate in exposed coastal areas. Its bark is grey to brown and smooth or flaky, and its branchlets are angular towards the end, with reddish brown granules. Its phyllodes are narrowly elliptic to elliptic, sometimes narrowly lance-shaped with the narrower end towards the base, straight or curved, 60–150 mm (2.4–5.9 in) long, 7–24 mm (0.28–0.94 in) wide and papery to almost leathery. There are three to five prominent longitudinal veins and a gland 2–7.5 mm (0.079–0.295 in) above the pulvinus. The flowers are pale yellow to cream-coloured, and loosely borne in up to five spikes 25–80 mm (0.98–3.15 in) long in axils. Flowering occurs from March to August, and the pods are erect, very narrowly lance-shaped with the narrower end towardx the bae, or linear, flat, straight sided, 50–110 mm (2.0–4.3 in) long, 4.5–10 mm (0.18–0.39 in) wide, woody and glabrous. The seeds are oblong, 4–7 mm (0.16–0.28 in) long and brown with a narrowly cone-shaped aril.

== Taxonomy ==
Acacia oncinocarpa was first formally described in 1842 by George Bentham in Hooker's London Journal of Botany from specimens collected by Allan Cunningham. The specific epithet (oncinocarpa) means 'hook-fruited'.

== Distribution and habitat ==
This species of wattle gows in sand or loam, often in gravelly soil on sandstone, granite or laterite, in eucalypt or Melaleuca woodland, forest or shrubland, often in coastal sand dunes of cliffs. It mainly occurs in the Northern Territory north of 16°S, and is common in Arnhem Land, but also occurs in the Northern Kimberley bioregion of northern Western Australia.

== See also ==
- List of Acacia species
