= Red Tuesday bushfires =

Late 19th Century Bushfire in Australia

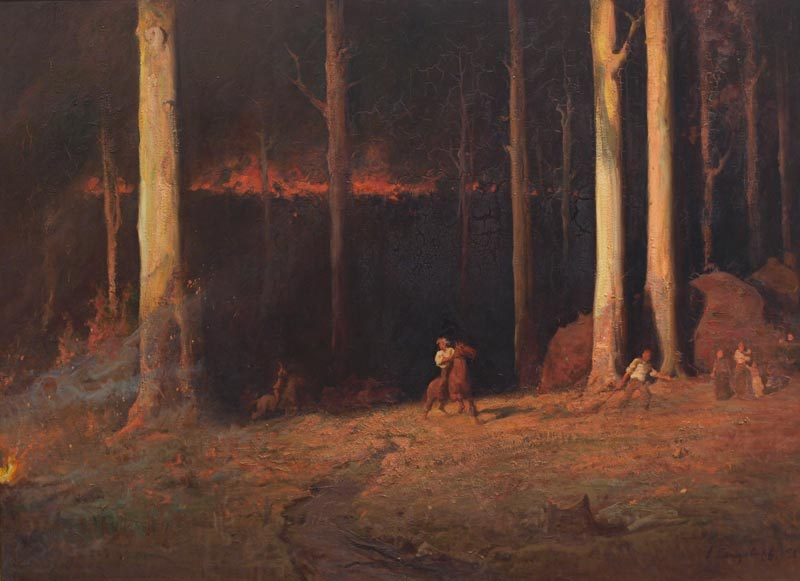
- Gippsland, on Sunday 20 February 1898 (Source:John Longstaff)
- Date: 1 February 1898
- Location: South Gippsland, Victoria, Australia

Statistics
- Burned area: 260,000 hectares (640,000 acres)

Impacts
- Deaths: 12
- Structures lost: 2,000

The Red Tuesday bushfires occurred on 1 February 1898 in South Gippsland, Victoria, Australia. The bushfires claimed 12 lives, destroyed over 2,000 buildings, and affected about 15,000 people, leaving 2,500 homeless. A total area of 260,000 hectares (640,000 acres) of bushland and farmland was destroyed by the fires.
