= Shire of Maffra =

Coordinates: 37°57′S 146°59′E

Shire of Maffra Victoria
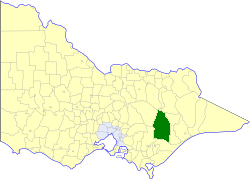
- Location in Victoria
- The Shire of Maffra as at its dissolution in 1994
- Population: 10,630 (1992)
  - Density: 2.5507/km^{2} (6.6064/sq mi)
- Established: 1875
- Area: 4,167.43 km^{2} (1,609.1 sq mi)
- Council seat: Maffra
- Region: Central Gippsland
- County: Tanjil, Wonnangatta
LGAs around Shire of Maffra:
Oxley	Bright	Bright
Mansfield	Shire of Maffra	Avon
Narracan	Rosedale	Sale (C)

The Shire of Maffra was a local government area about 20 kilometres (12 mi) north-northwest of Sale, the major regional centre in central Gippsland, Victoria, Australia. The shire covered an area of 4,167.43 square kilometres (1,609.1 sq mi), and existed from 1875 until 1994.

== History ==
Maffra was incorporated as a shire in October 1875. Part of its Eastern Riding was annexed to the Shire of Avon on 2 May 1917.

On 2 December 1994, the Shire of Maffra was abolished, and along with the City of Sale, the Shires of Alberton and Avon, and parts of the Shire of Rosedale, was merged into the newly created Shire of Wellington.

== Wards ==
The Shire of Maffra was divided into four ridings, each of which elected three councillors:

- Town Riding
- Central Riding
- East Riding
- West Riding

== Shire presidents ==
Presidents of the Shire of Maffra (1875-1892)
Years served	Name	Riding
1875-1876	Henry Gordon Glassford	
1876-1879	Allan McLean JP	
1879-1880	John Carpenter	
1880-1881	Henry Gordon Glassford	
1881-1882	George Davis	
1882-1884	Michael Landy JP	
1884-1887	George Davis	Western
1887-1888	Frederick Horstman	Central
1888-1889	Michael Landy JP	Eastern
1889-1890	John James Linton JP	Eastern
1890-1892	Edward Riggall	Western

== Towns and localities ==
- Bellbird Corner
- Boisdale
- Briagolong
- Bundalaguah
- Bushy Park
- Coongulla
- Glenmaggie
- Heyfield
- Licola
- Maffra*
- Mewburn Park
- Newry
- Seaton
- Tinamba
- Valencia Creek

* Council seat.

== Population ==
Year	Population
1954	8,554
1958	8,930*
1961	8,758
1966	8,511
1971	8,515
1976	8,479
1981	8,707
1986	9,564
1991	10,117

* Estimate in the 1958 Victorian Year Book.
