= 2012–13 Australian bushfire season =

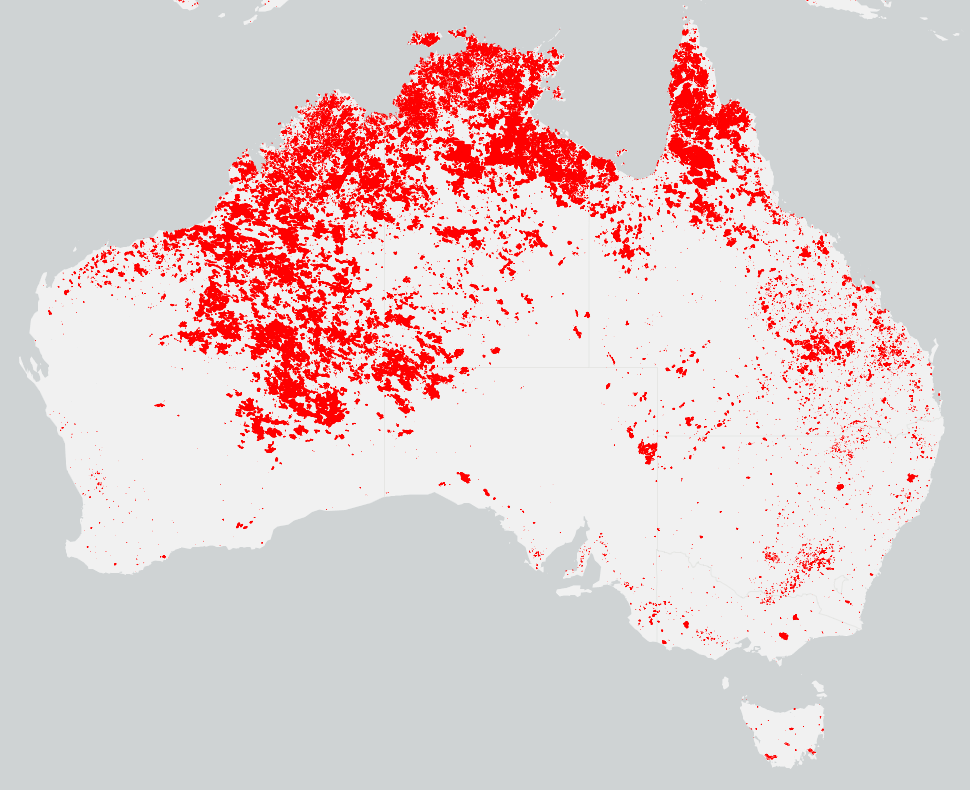
- NASA MODIS burned area detections from June 2012 to May 2013
- Date: Late winter (August) 2012 – Autumn (May) 2013
- Location: Australia

Statistics
- Burned area: >914,760 ha (2,260,400 acres)

Impacts
- Deaths: 4
- Injuries: 11
- Structures destroyed: 640+ total: 310 houses; 330+ non-residential structures

The summer of 2012–13 had above average fire potential for most of the southern half of the continent from the east coast to the west. This is despite having extensive fire in parts of the country over the last 12 months. The reason for this prediction is the abundant grass growth spurred by two La Niña events over the last two years.

Most parts of the country experienced a heat wave at the start of 2013, with a new national average maximum being set on 7 January 2013. The new record of 40.33 °C (105 °F) beat the old record of 40.17 °C (104 °F) that had been set on 21 December 1972. Another record that was beaten in 2013 was Australia's mean temperature, climbing from 31.86 °C (89 °F) set on 21 December 1972 to 32.23 °C (90 °F) on 7 January 2013.

Additionally, six of the 20 hottest days in Australian records (by average maximum) have been in January 2013.

Australia also experienced its hottest summer on average following a particularly hot spell in January. Using average day and night temperatures the average was found to be 28.6 °C (83 °F) beating the previous record set in the summer of 1997–1988. Fourteen of the weather bureau's 112 long term weather stations recorded their hottest days on record including one in Sydney that recorded a daytime record of 46 °C (115 °F). The daytime maximum temperatures for 2012–13 also beat the 1982–83 record. Irrespective, the month of January remained the hottest month since records began in 1910.

== Fires of note ==
State	Start date	Deaths	Injuries	Res. houses lost	Other structures lost	Area (ha)	Local govt.	Impacted communities	Duration	Ref.
WA	12 October 2012	1	4			1,000	Albany	Two Peoples Bay Nature Reserve	5 days	
SA	12 November 2012			2	14+	2,000	Port Lincoln	Tulka		
Qld	5 December 2012			1	1	750,000	Croydon	Croydon		
Tas	4 January 2013	1		193	180+	20,000	Tasman & Sorell	Boomer Bay, Carlton River, Connelly's Marsh, Copping, Dunalley, Murdunna, Sommers Bay & Taranna	10 days	
Tas	4 January 2013			8	several	4,900	Glamorgan-Spring Bay	Bicheno & Half Moon Bay	5 days	
NSW	6 January 2013			4	several	12,300	Snowy Monaro	Kybeyan Valley & Yarrabin	12 days	
Vic	8 January 2013		2	9	several	1,300	Pyrenees	Burrumbeet, Chepstowe, Carngham & Snake Valley		
NSW	13 January 2013			53	113	55,200	Gilgandra, Coonamble & Warrumbungle	Belar Creek, Bulgaldie & Coonabarabran	41 days	
Vic	17 January 2013	1		21	several	87,000	Wellington	Glenmaggie, Coongulla, Newry & Seaton	43 days	
Vic	21 January 2013	2				36,400	Alpine	Harrietville		
WA	14 February 2013			2	several	100	Donnybrook-Balingup	Greenbushes, Hester Brook, Maranup & Southampton		
WA	14 February 2013	1		1	several	1,300	Manjimup	Kin Kin		
WA	22 February 2013	1			several	9,400	Boddington	Quindanning		
Vic	27 March 2013		4	16	18	1,300	Golden Plains	Corindhap, Dereel & Mount Mercer		
SA	9 May 2013		2	1	several	650	Adelaide Hills	Cherryville		

== Fires by state or territory ==
=== New South Wales ===
Catastrophic fire danger ratings were observed in the Bombala, Condobolin, Hay, Nowra and Wagga Wagga fire regions on 8 January and in Coonamble on 13 January. Sydney also recorded its hottest day at 45.8 °C (114.4 °F) on 18 January.

==== December ====
On 16 December, a grass fire ignited along Geegulalong Rd., 9 km (5.6 mi) east of the community of Murringo. The fire burnt over 3,400 ha (8,400 acres) of grassland, destroyed 15 km (9.3 mi) of fencing and 500 head of livestock died.

==== January ====
During the first week of January, several dozen fires were ignited across southern regions of the state by lightning strikes; the Greater Hume, Hilltops, Snowy Monaro, Snowy Valleys, Wagga Wagga local government areas were affected.

On 6 January, a fire was reported to have ignited along Mount Forrest Road, Cooma, following lightning activity in the region. The fire made a significant run under the influence of westerly winds gusting at up to 120 km/h (75 mph) on 8 January. During a 13-day period, the fire burned 12,335 ha (30,480 acres) of scrub, forest and pasture in and around the Kybeyan State Conservation Area and impacted on properties within the Kybeyan Valley; 4 houses, 18 vehicles and 200 km (120 mi) of fencing were destroyed and 2,000 head of livestock died.

On 7 January, a fast moving grass fire ignited near the village of Oura. 140 volunteers from the RFS, six aircraft—including an Erickson Air-Crane—and four heavy plant equipment were used to try to contain the fire. Approximately 800 ha (2,000 acres) of scrub, forest and pasture were burned, one vehicle was destroyed and a firefighter suffered minor injuries after being over-run by the fire in a firefighting tanker.

On 8 January, a fire ignited around Bald Hill, approximately 8 km (5.0 mi) east of Jugiong, during temperatures of 42 °C (108 °F) and winds gusting to 80 km/h (50 mph). During a four-day, period, the fire burned 14,260 ha (35,200 acres) of scrub, forest and pasture and impacted on the communities of Berremangra, Bookham, Childowla, Talmo and Woolgarlo; although no houses were destroyed, a number of sheds and 1,200 km (750 mi) of fencing were destroyed and 10,200 head of livestock died.

On 12 January, a fire ignited near the Wambelong campground, on the north side of the John Renshaw Parkway and within the Warrumbungle National Park, during temperatures of up to 40.8 °C (105.4 °F). Steep, inaccessible terrain on the eastern and western flanks meant that the fire could not be contained or controlled on the first afternoon, despite the intervention of two fixed-wing firefighting aircraft, and the fire grew to 25 ha (62 acres) by the morning of 13 January. Catastrophic conditions were forecast for the Coonabarabran region throughout 13 January; the weather prediction across the fireground at 10:10 AEDT was for temperatures to be up to 45 °C (113 °F), relative humidity at 10% with winds to be north to north-westerly at 50 km/h (31 mph) gusting to 80 km/h (50 mph). At Coonabarabran Research Station, some 20 km (12 mi) from the point of ignition, a relative humidity of 28% was observed at 15:00 AEDT, and a "fresh gale" strength wind gust of 65 km/h (40 mph) from the north was recorded at 12:13 AEDT.

In the hours after midday the fire spotted across John Renshaw Parkway and breached the containment line, burning with flames of up to 33 m (108 ft) and impacting upon the Warrumbungle Visitors Centre, where a number of New South Wales Rural Fire Service and NSW National Parks & Wildlife Service employees were sheltering. By mid-afternoon, the fire was spreading downwind at a rate of 3.7 km/h (2.3 mph) and the NSW Police commenced evacuations to the east of the fire, including at Siding Spring Observatory. The observatory was impacted by the fire in the late afternoon, causing the destruction of three buildings in the complex; 'The Lodge' accommodation used by visiting researchers, the Director's Cottage and the Fire Station. Throughout the evening a 14 km (8.7 mi) high pyrocumulonimbus cloud formed above the blaze, creating unpredictable winds, intense spotting and other extreme meteorological conditions; the fire burned to the east, along Timor Rd., burning to within 13 km (8.1 mi) of Coonabarabran township. A southerly wind change passed through the fire ground some time after 18:00 AEDT, causing hot ash and embers to fall in Baradine, 50 km (31 mi) north of Coonabarabran, throughout the night and prompting the Baradine local hospital to secure the windows with damp towels to prevent the entry of smoke and ash.

Over a 41-day period, the fire burned 55,210 ha (136,400 acres) of pasture, scrub and forest—including 95 percent of the Warrumbungles National Park—and impacted the communities of Bugaldie, Coonabarabran, Goorianawa, Quanda, Tonderburine and Warrumbungle; a hotel, three buildings at the Siding Spring Observatory, 53 houses, 130 other non-residential structures and 1,700 km (1,100 mi) of fencing were destroyed and 1,100 head of livestock died in the fire.

==== November ====
On 11 November, a fire ignited on private property west of Sleaford Mere, near Port Lincoln. The fire ultimately burned 1,800 ha (4,400 acres) of scrub, grassland and pasture and impacted the community of Tulka; 14 cabins on the foreshore at Sleaford Mere, 2 homes, a caravan, a campervan, several sheds and four other vehicles were destroyed and 300 head of livestock died.

==== January ====
On 4 February, a fire ignited near Finniss during temperatures of up to 43.8 °C (110.8 °F) in the region. During the afternoon, the fire was brought under control by 60 firefighters, supported by firefighting aircraft. Approximately 300 ha (740 acres) of crops, farmland and vineyards were burned by the fire and a 1 km (0.62 mi) portion of rail tracks for the Steam Ranger was destroyed.

==== May ====
On 9 May, a private burn-off north of Cherryville in the Adelaide Hills escaped the landowner's control and burnt east into inaccessible countryside. More than 250 Country Fire Service volunteers and four aerial water bombers took three days to contain the fire, assisted by rain on the evening of the third day. The fire burned at least 670 ha (1,700 acres) of scrub and pasture and impacted the community of Cherryville; one house and two sheds were destroyed and two firefighters were treated for minor injuries. The fire was notable in that it occurred outside the fire-ban season, leading to calls that the season should be extended.

=== Tasmania ===
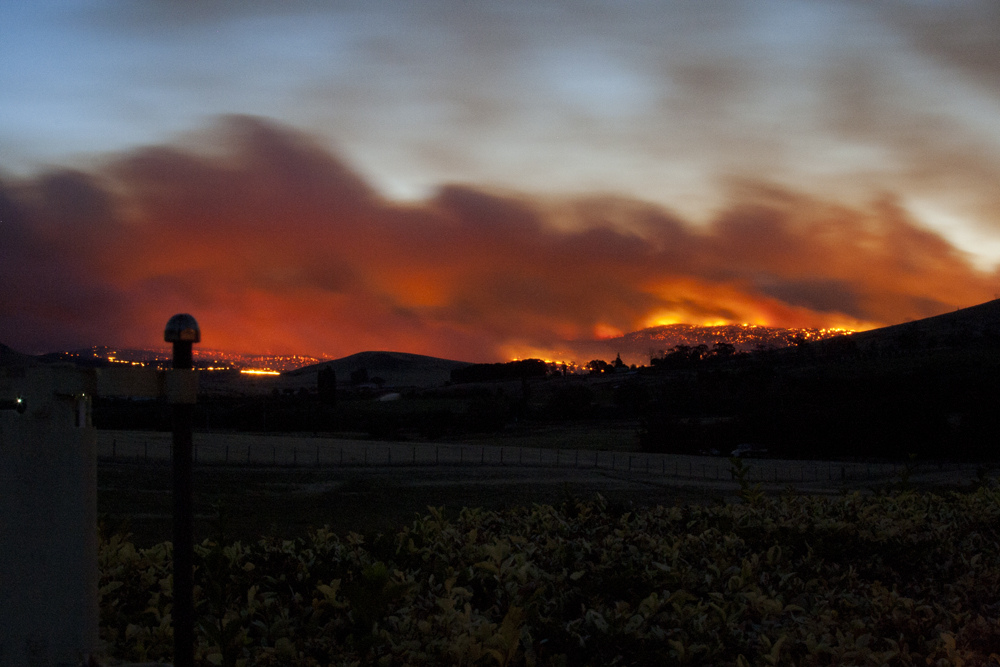
Fires in Tasmania 2013

=== Victoria ===
Between 1 October and 4 March, the Country Fire Authority attended 539 bush and grass fires larger than 1 ha (2.5 acres).

==== January ====
On 8 January, a farmer's road vehicle ignited a fire at the bottom of a slope near Chepstowe, approximately 30 km (19 mi) west of Ballarat. At least 360 CFA and 42 DSE personnel, supported by 6 firefighting aircraft and 3 bulldozers, fought to contain the fire and 400 residents and visitors were evacuated from Carngham and Burrumbeet caravan park. During a 5 km (3.1 mi) run from the point of ignition, the fire burned 1,300 ha (3,200 acres) of scrub, grassland and pasture and impacted upon the communities of Burrumbeet, Carngham, Chepstowe and Snake Valley; The historic 120-year-old Carngham Station and 8 other houses, 12 cars and tractors, a number of sheds, and vineyards at Chepstowe Vineyard were destroyed and 800 head of livestock died. At least 6 people required medical attention as a result of the fire, 2 for minor burns and 4 for smoke inhalation.

On 17 January, a fire ignited in bushland in the Donnelly Creek Rd. area, near Aberfeldy. As the fire spread to the east, 61 children and 15 adults were evacuated from the Licola Wilderness Village, while 10 residents and about 30 firefighters remained in Licola. Unusually for a fire in Australia, a significant spread occurred at night and by the following day the fire had covered 48,000 ha (120,000 acres), with spot fires starting to the south-east and impacting the communities of Coongulla, Glenmaggie, Heyfield, Newry and Seaton, causing destruction. On 18 January, it was announced the body of a man had been found in a burnt out vehicle in Seaton. The fire was the largest in the state since the Black Saturday fires of 2009 and required significant commitment from firefighting authorities to control; 760 firefighting personnel from the CFA and DSE in 180 firefighting appliances and 23 bulldozers, supported by 13 firefighting aircraft, attended to the blaze over its 43-day duration. The fire burned 87,000 ha (210,000 acres) of forest, scrub and grassland—much within the Baw Baw National Park—and impacted upon the communities of Coongulla, Dawson, Glenmaggie, Heyfield, Licola, Newry and Seaton; 21 houses, 17 vehicles, a number of sheds and caravans were destroyed.

On 21 January, lightning ignited a fire in the vicinity of Mt. Feathertop, near Harrietville and within the Alpine National Park. By 8 February, windy conditions had caused the fire to grow to 14,000 ha (35,000 acres) and burn to within 50 m (160 ft) of homes near Mount Hotham On 13 February, two fire fighters from the Department of Sustainability and Environment were killed after a tree fell on a vehicle they were in while fighting the fire in the Buckland Valley. The 30 m (98 ft) tall tree fell during the passage of a storm cell over the area in the mid-afternoon; a decision not to evacuate the fire ground for the possibility of falling trees was heavily criticized. On 27 February, the fire was declared contained after burning 36,400 ha (90,000 acres) of public and private land during a 55-day period.

==== February ====
On 14 February, lightning ignited a number of fires in the Victoria Valley, approximately 30 km (19 mi) north-east of Hamilton, and the fires burned into the south-west of the Grampians National Park. Several of these fires would merge on 18 February, creating a 3,260 ha (8,100 acres) fire complex and threatening properties in the Mirranatwa community. By 21 February, the Victoria Valley Complex fire had burned 25,000 ha (62,000 acres) and threatened the areas Woohlpooer and Mooralla. 300 firefighters, supported by 14 aircraft, attended to the blaze. On 27 February the fire was declared contained, after burning through 35,875 ha (88,650 acres) and destroying 3 sheds, 130 kilometres of fencing, 65 hectares (161 acres) of hardwood forest and 30 tonnes of hay and causing the deaths of 60 head of livestock.

On 18 February, a fire ignited in grass along Donnybrook Rd., Donnybrook, and quickly spread to impact upon the Hume Freeway, disrupting traffic. Several hundred firefighters in approximately 80 appliances and supported by 6 firefighting aircraft were required to bring the fire under control by the following morning. During the fire, 2,040 ha (5,000 acres) of scrub, grassland and pasture were burned and the communities of Donnybrook and Epping were impacted; several sheds, seven vehicles and 3,000 hay bales were destroyed and one house damaged.

==== March ====
On 27 March, a suspicious fire ignited in dense scrub along Ferrers Rd., Dereel, and spread rapidly, spotting up to 2 km (1.2 mi) ahead of the main fire front. During the following hours, 1,300 ha (3,200 acres) of scrub, grassland and pasture were burned and fire impacted on property in and around the communities of Corindhap, Dereel and Mount Mercer; 16 houses and 15 sheds were destroyed within a few hours. Several hundred firefighters in at least 50 firefighting appliances attended the blaze and 4 firefighters required hospital treatment for minor burns and smoke inhalation.

=== Western Australia ===
---

== August ==
=== Northern Territory ===
A bushfire burnt out a large area of pasture at Newcastle Waters Station on 20 August when a car caught fire on the Stuart Highway, the fire to the east of the highway was extinguished but the area to the west was controlled by station workers to keep it away from stock. The fire eventually came to Lake Longreach within the station where it burnt out in the damp conditions.

== September ==
=== Queensland ===
Fire crews battled blazes on the Atherton Tableland to keep a bushfire behind containment lines near Millstream on 24 September, the fires were thought to be started by arsonists. It was brought under control later the following day after three houses were evacuated and 15 square kilometres (3,707 acres) of bushland were burnt out.

=== New South Wales ===
Fire broke out in the Awabakal Nature reserve between Dudley and Redhead 24 September. During the course of the day the fire consumed 140 hectares (346 acres) of bushland and was brought under control the following day following rain in the area.

=== Northern Territory ===
Two fires were burning in the West MacDonnell Ranges on 4 September as was a larger fire about 20 kilometres (12 mi) north of Curtin Springs Station, the Lasseter Highway had to be closed in the area due to the resulting smoke hazard.

=== Western Australia ===
In 2012 a fire was burning for three days near Madura Station covering the Eyre Highway in smoke. Over 300 hectares (741 acres) of bushland was consumed by the blaze.

== October ==
=== Queensland ===
Huge fires consumed over 1,100,000 acres (445,154 ha) of grasslands in gulf area. Graziers were left with very little feed left for 50,000–60,000 head of cattle in the area and the historic Croydon -Esmeralda Homestead that dated back to the 1800s was also burnt to the ground.

=== New South Wales ===
Five bushfires were burning simultaneously in the Singleton area in late October including one in the Pokolbin State forest.

=== Northern Territory ===
Dry storms caused the outbreak of hundreds of fires in the border region of the Northern Territory and Western Australia over a week between 14 and 23 October. Affected areas included Curtin Springs Station (which had also been hit by fires in September), Lyndavale Station, and Petermann Aboriginal Land Trust, approximately 400 kilometres (249 mi) south west of Alice Springs. Many of the fires were left to burn in areas that were inaccessible and high winds made containment too difficult. Curtin Springs lost over 250,000 acres (101,171 ha) of bush, nearly a quarter of its pasture land, as a result of the fires. Surrounding stations Angas Downs and Kings Creek lost similar amounts.

=== Western Australia ===
A bush fire broke out on private land near Two Peoples Bay on 12 October and a team of about 20 fire-fighters arrived to combat the blaze. Following a sudden change in wind direction a track carrying two of the fire crew was engulfed in flames. The two women, both females, received terrible burns. The 45-year-old woman received burns to 60% of her body was admitted to hospital in critical condition and the 24-year-old had burns to 40% of her body and was also critical but stable. Both women were transferred from Albany via the Royal Flying Doctor Service to Perth. Three other fire crew were injured, a second truck was burnt out and over 1,000 hectares (2,500 acres) of bushland were burnt before the fire was contained later the same day. The older woman, Wendy Bearfoot, died in Royal Perth Hospital 1 November as a result of her injuries, a WorkSafe investigation was launched to investigate the circumstances.

== November ==
=== New South Wales ===
Properties were threatened by a bushfire at Lake Macquarie on 1 November. The fire burnt out over 200 hectares (494 acres) of bushland and was eventually contained by 120 members of the Rural Fire Service the following day.

Two fires broke out in the Upper Hunter Valley on 25 November. The first fire was burning in the Wollemi National Park and the second near Bunnan had burned out 120 hectares (297 acres). Both were under control on 26 November.

=== Northern Territory ===
Two large fires resulted in large areas of bushland being burnt. The fires were burning uncontrollably on 19 November, one east of Tennant Creek and another on Yambah Station about 60 kilometres (37 mi) north of Alice Springs. Both fires were monitored and some back burning was done in an effort to control the blazes.

=== South Australia ===
Seven houses were lost along with sheds and vehicles on 11 November in a fire that swept through 2,000 hectares (4,942 acres) of land at Tulka near Port Lincoln. Lightning strikes caused over 100 fires to ignite around the state on 20 November. Fires on the Eyre Peninsula were the most difficult with one fire advancing to within 7 kilometres (4 mi) of Port Lincoln. A number of residents evacuated their homes after 500 hectares (1,236 acres) of bush was lost despite the efforts of 120 fire-fighters and five waterbombers used to combat the blaze. The following day a further 31,591 lightning strikes initiated a further 300 fires, 600 volunteers worked overnight to extinguish the majority of fires. The Port Lincoln fire continued to burn consuming a total of 1,700 hectares (4,201 acres) of scrub.

=== Tasmania ===
Several fires erupted in late November, including a major fire at Forcett, in which 11 firefighters were evacuated with injuries after a wind change. There were other fires, such as the one at Glenlusk on the outskirts of Hobart and another major fire at Poatina in the Central Lakes district. The fire at Forcett was rapidly brought under control, while the one at Glenlusk posed serious danger to houses and farms (and actually destroyed several vehicles and shacks). The fire at Poatina Road in the Central Lakes District was burning out of control two weeks later and was only brought under control in the middle of January.

=== Victoria ===
A huge blaze broke out near Casterton on 21 November and quickly burnt out over 4,000 hectares (9,884 acres) bushland. Fire crews employed back burns to create control lines around the fire, which was extinguished a few days later.

== December ==
=== Queensland ===
A fire broke out on North Stradbroke Island, off Brisbane on 8 December. By 10 December several properties had been lost to the fire at Myora Springs. Several other fires were burning around the state including two west of Brisbane and another near Ipswich.

=== New South Wales ===
On 16 December, a grass fire broke out 9 kilometres (5.6 mi) east of the village of Murringo. The fire burnt over 3,400 hectares (8,402 acres) of grassland, 15 kilometres (9.3 mi) of fencing and killed 500 sheep.

=== South Australia ===
A bushfire started 23 December about 18 kilometres (11 mi) south west from Padthaway and burned out over 5,000 hectares (12,355 acres) of scrub and grassland.

=== Victoria ===
The town of Langkoop was threatened by fire that burned over 300 hectares (741 acres) of grassland before being controlled, residents had been evacuated to Edenhope. This was one of 35 fires that started 23 and 24 December around the state.

== January ==
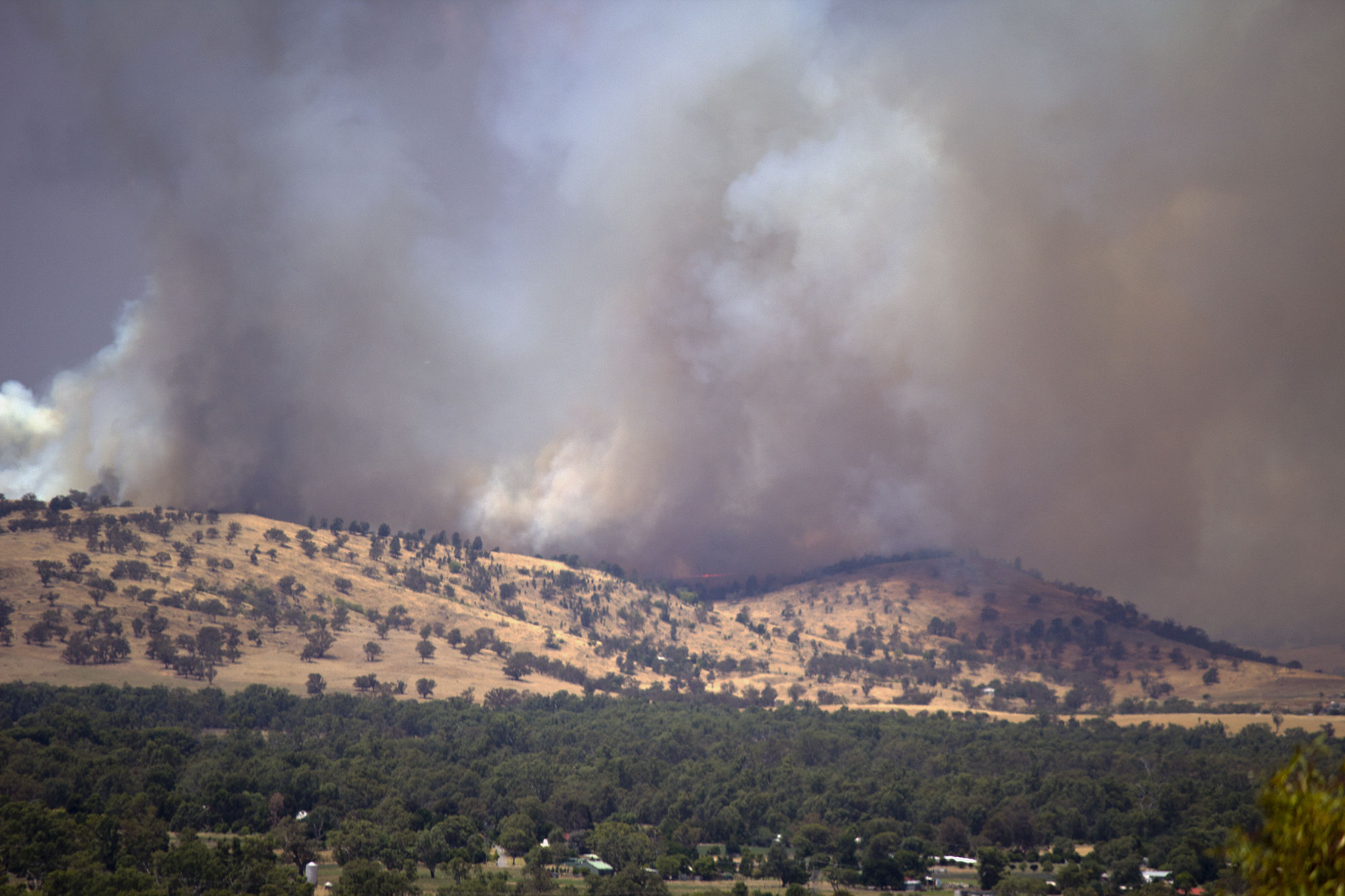
Smoke and flames from the Oura fire visible from the city of Wagga Wagga

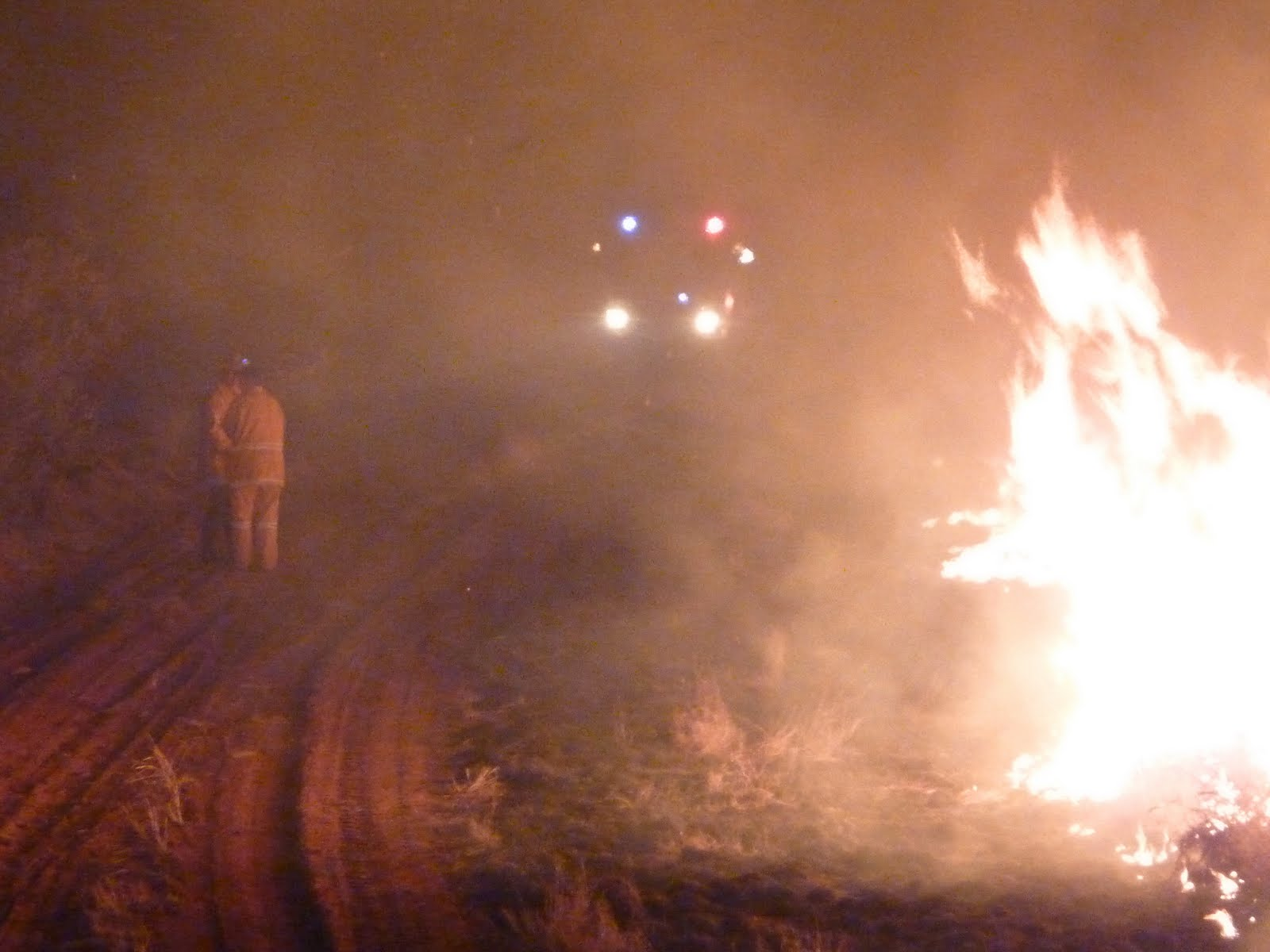
Northern Territory fire 2013

=== Northern Territory ===
During the course of a heat wave several fires broke out in the Northern Territory. One fire that originated in the Watarrka National Park spread into the Kings Canyon resort on 8 January causing damage and leading to the evacuation of 120 staff and guests. A second fire at Napperby station had burnt through 200 square kilometres (77 sq mi) with 50 feet (15 m) flames jumping containment lines.

=== Tasmania ===
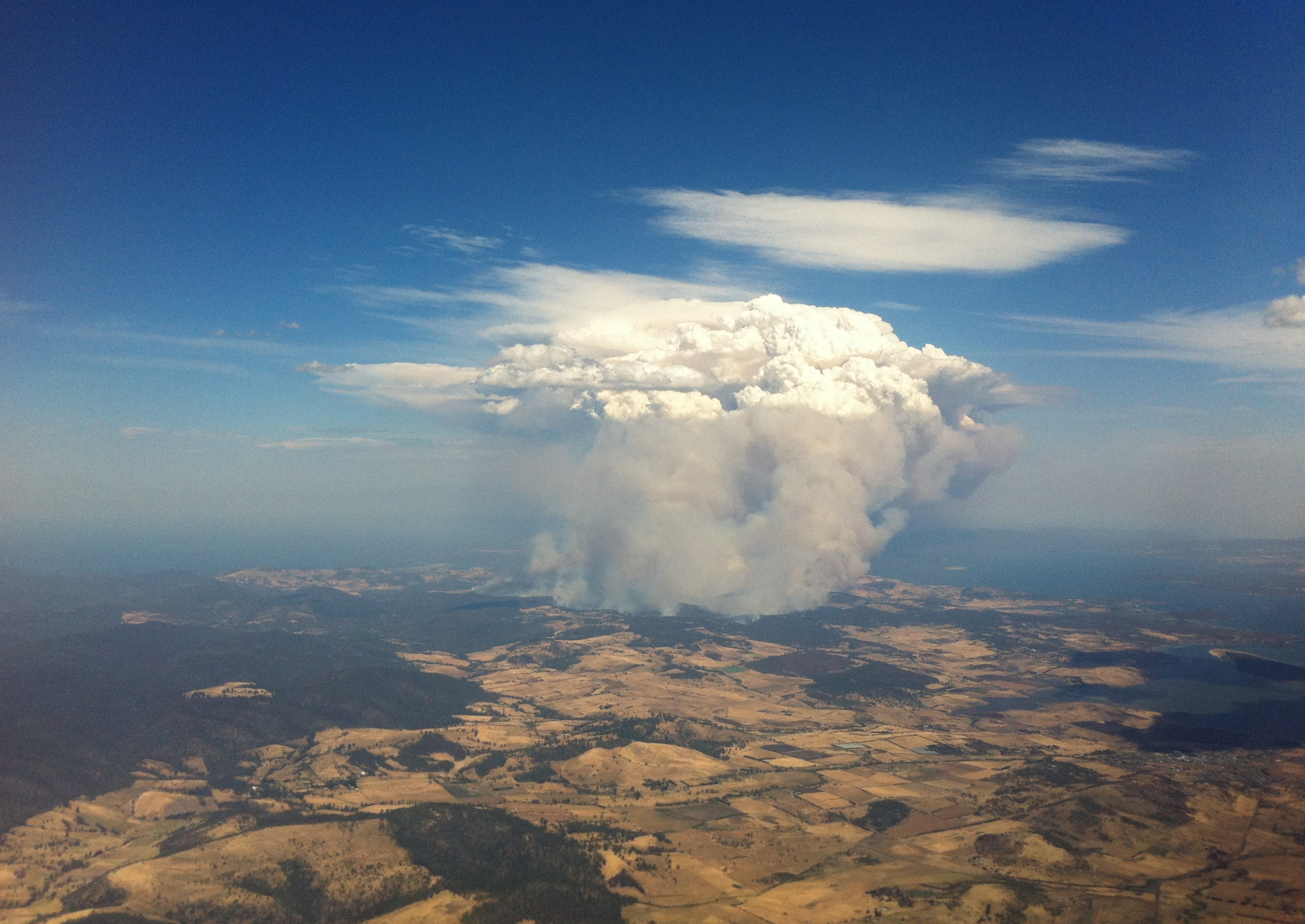
Smoke plume from the Copping/Forcett fire

Several large bushfires started on the afternoon of 3 January, including blazes at Lake Repulse, Richmond and Inala Rd, Forcett. The bushfires in both the Forcett and Lake Repulse areas both rapidly burned out over 1,000 hectares of land, burning in an easterly direction as a result of the prevailing Westerly wind, which pushed the Forcett Fire parallel to the Arthur Highway. It was attacked front on by Tasmania Fire Service crews and stopped just short of Copping in the evening of 3 January. A Northerly wind change on 4 January caused the fire to jump the Arthur Highway by 3pm on 4 January and spread south towards Primrose Sands and Dunalley. At least one hundred buildings, including 10 in Copping and 65 in Dunalley were destroyed. The fire spread towards the Forestier and Tasman Peninsulas, threatening the townships of Murdunna and Eaglehawk Neck.

Meanwhile, another major fire burned to the north of Hobart at Lake Repulse, threatening the communities of Elendale, Ouse and Meadowbank, it was also expected that the communities of Hamilton and Lawrenny would be impacted by 6am on the morning of 6 January.

=== South Australia ===
Temperatures soared to 43.8 °C (111 °F) near Finniss, south of Adelaide, shortly before a bushfire broke out on 4 January. About 300 hectares (741 acres) of crops, farmland and vineyards were destroyed by the fire along with a portion of rail tracks for the Steam Ranger until it was brought under control by 60 fire fighters and waterbombers.

=== Victoria ===
A fire broke out in Kentbruck in the southwest of the state on 4 January. It had covered 7,050 hectares (17,421 acres) by 8 January, posing a threat to the nearby communities of Drik Drik and Dartmoor. On 8 January a 1,300 hectares (3,212 acres) fire to the west of Ballarat swept through the localities of Snake Valley, Chepstowe and Carngham destroying nine homes including the historic homestead Carngham Station.

On 17 January a fire began in bushland in the Donnelly Creek Road area near Aberfeldy. As the fire spread to the east, 61 children and 15 adults were evacuated from the Licola Wilderness Village, while 10 residents and about 30 firefighters remained in Licola. By the following day the fire had covered 48,000 hectares (118,611 acres), with spot fires starting to the south-east at Coongulla, Glenmaggie, Heyfield, Newry and Seaton. 22 houses were destroyed as well as a number of dwellings at Glenmaggie Caravan Park. On 18 January, it was announced the body of a man was found in his burnt out vehicle in Seaton. By 30 January the fire had burnt out a total area of 75,000 hectares (185,329 acres).

=== Western Australia ===
A fire broke out in the Shire of Gingin near Lennard Brooke on 26 January and raged out of control overnight while burning through 65 hectares (161 acres) of bushland. Over 50 firefighters were required to save homes and sheds from the blaze and had the blaze under control the following day. Bushfires were also burning around Busselton which were thought to have been deliberately lit, following the outbreak of about 25 fires over the course of the month. Another fire was accidentally started by the exhaust of a quad-bike being used to spray weeds by a contractor on 29 January at the Benger Swamp reserve south of Harvey. Over 300 hectares (741 acres) of scrub was burned before it was brought under control.

A bushfire near Carnarvon was burning on the north eastern side of town on 28 January. The fire burnt out of control with strong winds starting spot fires among the banana plantations. The blaze was controlled a day later but not before 1,400 hectares (3,459 acres) of bushland destroying 20 derelict buildings and sheds, but leaving the plantations with only minor damage.

== February ==
=== Tasmania ===
On 10 February 13 bushfires were burning across the state. The largest of these, at Molesworth to the north-west of Hobart, had burnt more than 1,900 hectares (4,695 acres), destroying sheds, cars and a caravan.

=== Victoria ===
On 8 February a bushfire fanned by strong winds came within 50 metres (160 ft) of homes near Mount Hotham. The fire, which was started by lightning on 21 January in the Alpine National Park near Harrietville, had increased in size to approximately 14,000 hectares (34,595 acres).

On 13 February, two fire fighters from the Department of Sustainability and Environment were killed after a tree fell on a vehicle they were in, while fighting the Harrietville fire, which has burnt 27,000 hectares (66,718 acres) of bushland. The fire ended up burning for 55 days in total and destroyed 37,000 hectares (91,429 acres) of public and private land.

A large fire started in Donnybrook on 18 February. The grassfire became an out of control blaze, burning approximately 2,040 hectares (5,041 acres) as it headed south from Donnybrook towards the northern suburbs of Melbourne. 170 firefighters in 40 trucks battled the flames on a hot and gusty day.

=== Western Australia ===
A bushfire broke out under suspicious circumstances in the outer suburb of Pink Lake in Esperance on 4 February. 50 firefighters and two fixed wing waterbombers were required to contain the blaze. The fire burnt through an area of over 500 hectares (1,236 acres) and one home was destroyed in the blaze.

Another fire broke on 5 February out near Boddington and burnt out of control destroying a cottage. An area over 800 hectares (1,977 acres) was burnt out before the fire was contained.

Fires broke out south east of Byford on the South Western Highway in Whitby on 12 February. An emergency warning was issued as the fire headed toward the Darling Range through thick forest with a scattering of houses.

Another fire started 13 February near the Blackwood River near Southampton and then burnt out of control through the surrounding forest before destroying two homes, including the historic Southampton Homestead, and 1,700 hectares (4,201 acres) near Bridgetown.

More fires broke out 15 February including one north of Australind near Leschenault that threatened homes and properties. Another further south near Kin Kin which had started earlier in the week from lightning strikes had burnt through 1,232 hectares (3,044 acres) of bushland. Human remains were found in a shack in Kin Kin on 15 February.

Lightning started a fire near Bindoon on 21 February and quickly burnt through 2,000 hectares (4,942 acres) of bushland pushed by strong winds and threatening nearby homes. The blaze was brought under control the following day when favourable weather conditions prevailed.

A volunteer fire-fighter was killed on 22 February while cleaning up after a fire in Quindanning about 160 kilometres (99 mi) south east of Perth. The man was hit by a falling branch and was taken to hospital where he was pronounced as dead on arrival.

Fires threatened homes in Upper Swan on 26 February before being brought under control by over 70 fire-fighters. Residents were evacuated as the blaze consumed 150 hectares (371 acres) of bushland.

More fires started on 28 February at Shady Hills in Bullsbrook and the western end of Walyunga National Park. Over 200 fire-fighters were required to bring the blaze under control by the following day, but not before the blaze burned out over 1,500 hectares (3,707 acres) of bushland.

== March ==
=== Victoria ===
On 27 March, a bushfire at Dereel, south of Ballarat destroyed 16 houses and 18 sheds. Four firefighters required hospital treatment for minor burns and smoke inhalation. The fire, which covered 1,300 hectares (3,212 acres), was brought under control in the evening.

== May ==
=== South Australia ===
On 9 May, a private burn-off north of Cherryville in the Adelaide Hills escaped the landowner's control and burnt east into inaccessible countryside. More than 250 Country Fire Service volunteers and four aerial water bombers took three days to contain the fire, assisted by rain on the evening of the third day. One house and two sheds were destroyed, with the fire burning 670 hectares (1,700 acres) of scrub and farmland. Two firefighters were treated for minor injuries. The fire was notable in that it occurred outside the fire-ban season, leading to calls that the season should be extended.
