= Boisdale railway station =

Disused railway station in Boisdale, Victoria

Coordinates: 37.88496°S 146.98929°E

Boisdale
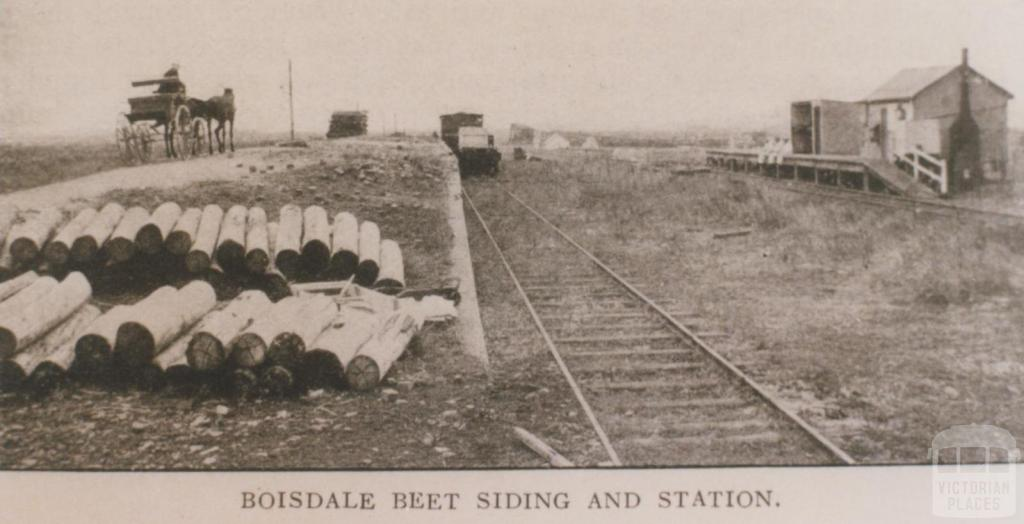
- Boisdale railway station in 1912. Station building is on the right.

General information
- Line: Briagolong
- Platforms: 1
- Tracks: 1

Other information
- Status: Closed

History
- Opened: 1889
- Closed: 1952

Services
Preceding station	Disused railways	Following station
Maffra	Briagolong line	Bushy Park
List of closed railway stations in Victoria
Location

Boisdale is a closed station located in the town of Boisdale, on the Briagolong railway line in Victoria, Australia.

== History ==
The station opened concurrently with the Briagolong railway line in 1889, and was 224 km from Southern Cross. The main items freighted at the station were sugar beet and firewood. In 1902, a farmer named John Bennett fell off the platform at the station onto the rails, breaking two of his ribs. Bennett ultimately was compensated by the Railway Department with a "substantial settlement".

Boisdale station was closed to passenger traffic in 1930. The station ultimately closed fully in 1952, after which the station building was demolished and the tracks removed. On 6 January 1955, the Shire of Maffra council submitted an application to Victorian Railways to acquire the site of the former Boisdale railway station, and ownership was granted to the shire in August 1962. Today, the railway station site is home to the Boisdale Recreation Reserve, which opened in 1968.

Passenger bookings at Boisdale station
Year	Passengers
1901	879
1910	334
1915	597
1920	1841
1930	223
