= Central Gippsland =

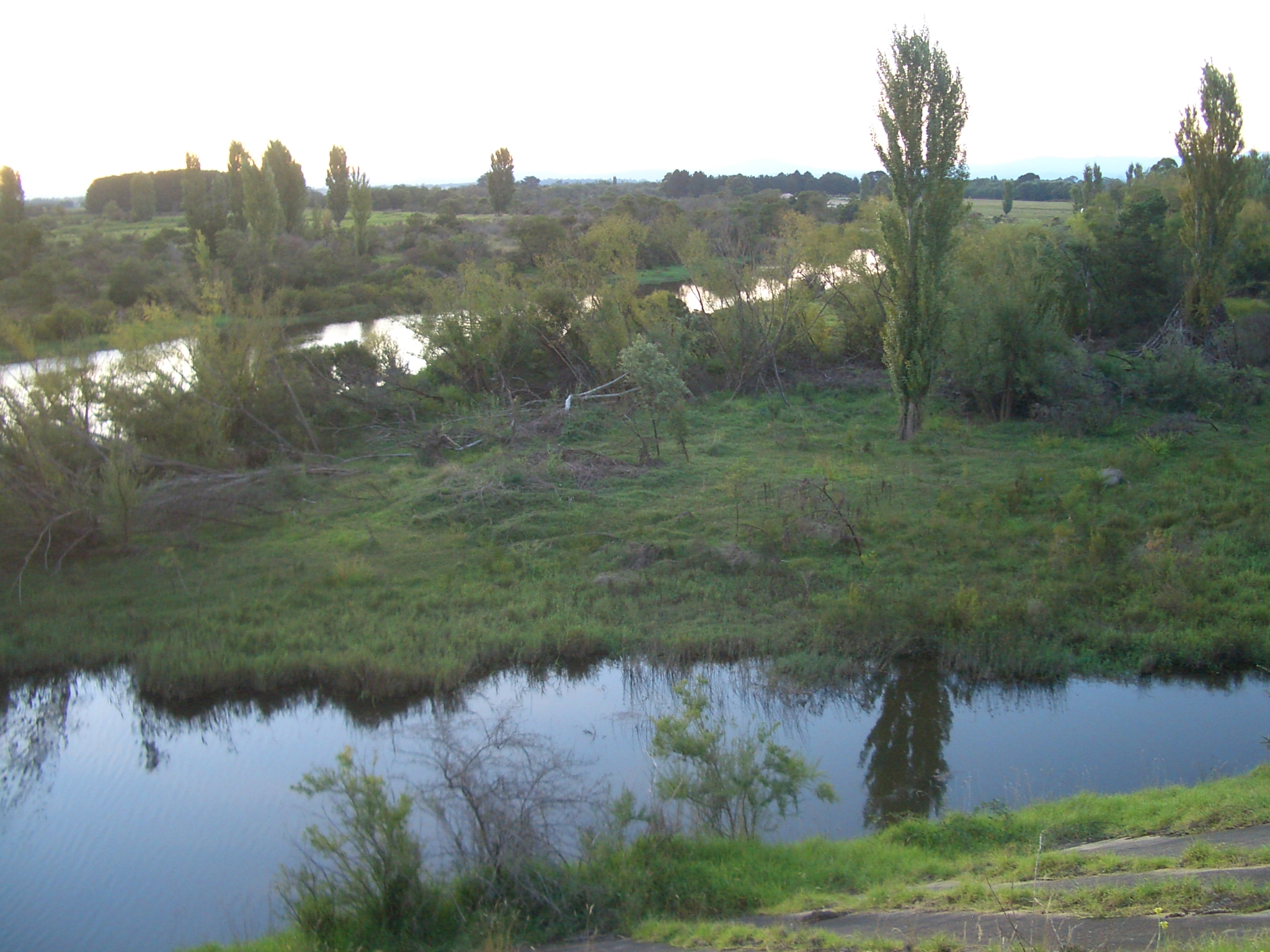
On the Avon River south of Stratford

The area known as Central Gippsland, also termed North Gippsland, is a region of Gippsland in Victoria, Australia, roughly corresponding to Shire of Wellington. Often this region is considered part of a larger "East Gippsland".

Central Gippsland occupies a broad stretch of plains between the Latrobe Valley to the west and the Gippsland Lakes to the east and between the Great Dividing Range to the north and Bass Strait (Ninety Mile Beach) to the south. Near the mouth of the Latrobe River is the main town Sale, which has a population of about 19,600 (including Wurruk and Longford), a nearby air force base, and as a centre for the offshore gasfields in Bass Strait. It was one of the earliest settled areas of Gippsland, whose early economy was aided by the presence of a river port. Other main towns in Central Gippsland include Rosedale, Maffra noted for butter manufacture and Stratford on the Avon River. Smaller towns include Heyfield, Coongulla, Cowwarr and Newry.

Central Gippsland is covered by the Gippsland Regional Forest Agreement (RFA) which covers an area similar to the Shire of Wellington, and places 7,805 km² in reserves.

The area is a major agricultural producer in the state of Victoria, often known as the "food belt" of Victoria.
