= Toongabbie railway station, Victoria =

Former railway station in Victoria, Australia

Coordinates: 38°03′42″S 146°37′26″E

Toongabbie

General information
- Line: Maffra
- Platforms: 1
- Tracks: 1

Other information
- Status: Closed

History
- Opened: 1883
- Closed: 1986

Services
Preceding station	Disused railways	Following station
Glengarry	Maffra line	Cowwarr
List of closed railway stations in Victoria
Location

Toongabbie is a closed station located in the town of Toongabbie, on the Maffra railway line in Victoria, Australia.

== History ==
It opened in 1883 with the construction of the line from Traralgon to Heyfield and was 176 km from Southern Cross. In 1927, the amount of revenue derived from the station was £937. The station closed in 1986.
