= Glengarry railway station =

Former railway station in Victoria, Australia

Coordinates: 38°07′24″S 146°34′29″E

Glengarry
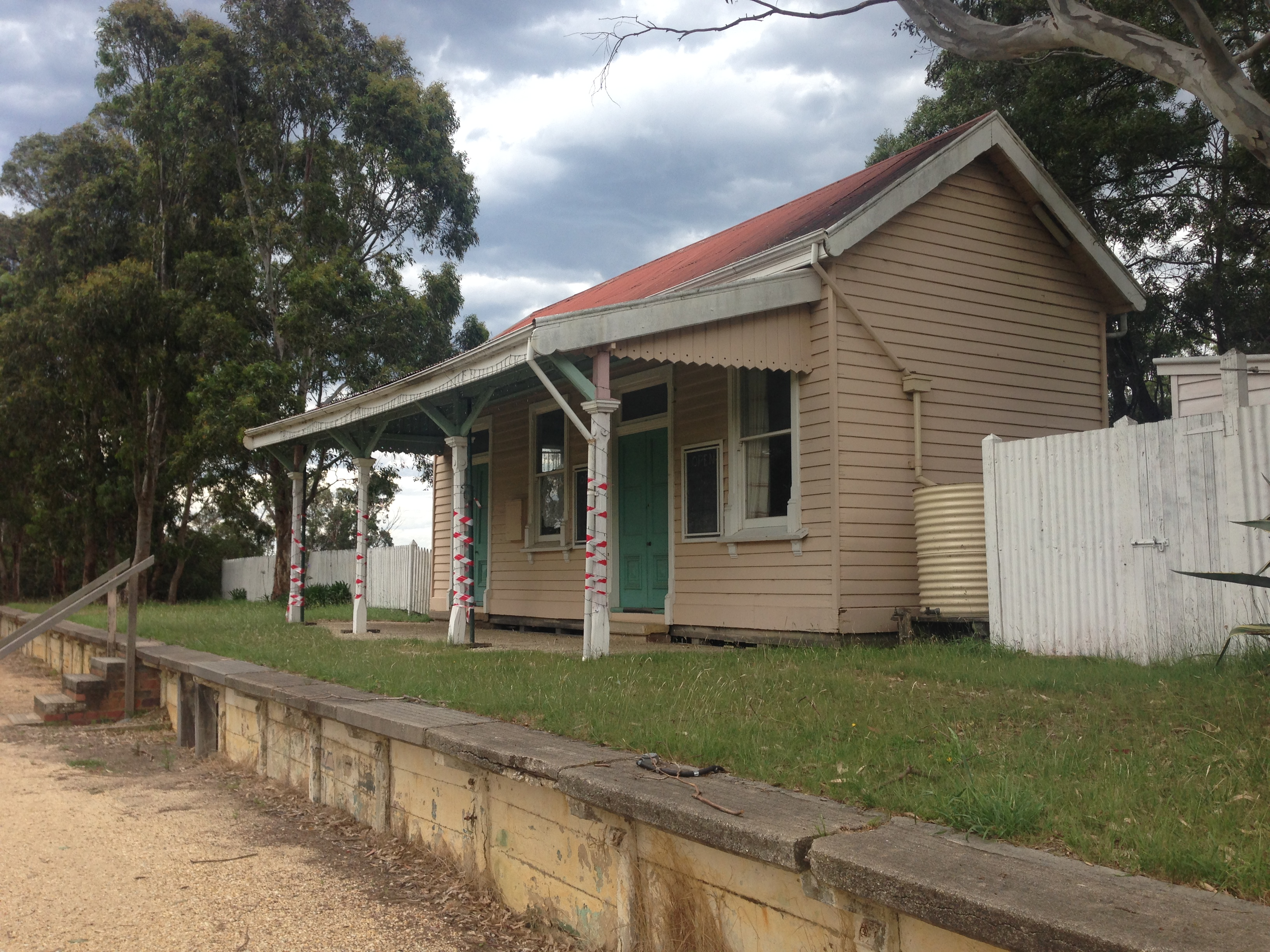
- Glengarry railway station in 2017

General information
- Line: Maffra
- Platforms: 1
- Tracks: 1

Other information
- Status: Closed

History
- Opened: 1883
- Closed: 1986

Services
Preceding station	Disused railways	Following station
Traralgon	Maffra line	Toongabbie
List of closed railway stations in Victoria
Location

Glengarry is a closed station located in the town of Glengarry, on the Maffra railway line in Victoria, Australia.

== History ==
Glengarry railway station opened in 1883 with the construction of the line from Traralgon to Heyfield and was 167 km from Southern Cross station. The station was first named La Trobe but was renamed Glengarry shortly after opening.

A post office operated at the station from 1 January 1884. On 1 December 1884 the post office name was changed from La Trobe Railway Station Post office to Glengarry Post Office. In 1887, there was an attempted robbery at the station, with burglars tampering with a safe and breaking into a shed. In 1927, the amount of revenue derived from the station was £2227.

The station building and platform have been restored as a Cafe.
