= Bushy Park railway station =

Former railway station in Victoria, Australia

Coordinates: 37.87161°S 147.01408°E

Bushy Park
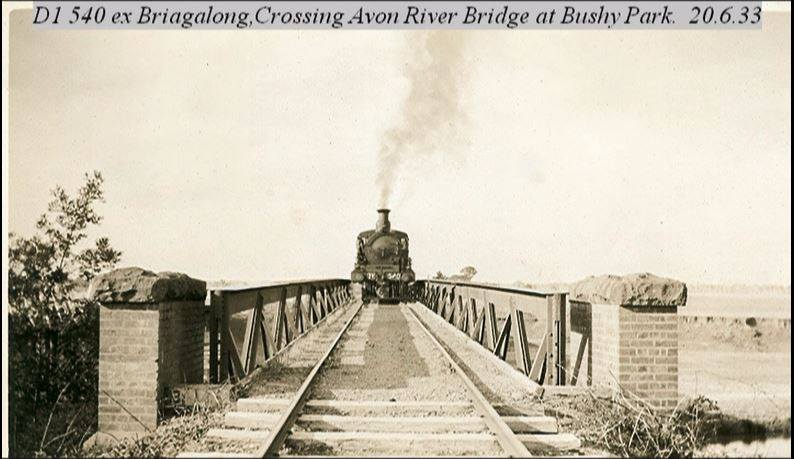
- Train crossing the Avon River at Bushy Park.

General information
- Line: Briagolong
- Platforms: 1
- Tracks: 1

Other information
- Status: Closed

History
- Opened: 1889
- Closed: 1952

Services
Preceding station	Disused railways	Following station
Boisdale	Briagolong line	Briagolong
List of closed railway stations in Victoria
Location

Bushy Park is a closed station located in the town of Bushy Park, on the Briagolong railway line in Victoria, Australia.

== History ==
The station opened at the same time as the Briagolong railway line in 1889, and was 227 km from Southern Cross. The wattle bark industry was a significant industry in the area, and in 1950 there was a weighbridge for bark at the station. The railway station closed in 1952.
