= Tinamba =

- Town
- Coordinates: 37°58′S 146°53′E
- Country: Australia
- State: Victoria
- LGA: Shire of Wellington
- Location: 211 km (131 mi) E of Melbourne; 28 km (17 mi) NW of Sale; 9 km (5.6 mi) W of Maffra

Government
  - State electorate: Gippsland East
  - Federal division: Gippsland

Population
  - Total: 500 (2006 census)
- Postcode: 3859

Tinamba is a town in Victoria, Australia, located on Traralgon - Maffra Road between Heyfield and Maffra, in the Shire of Wellington. It has a country pub, a church, engineer works and two dilapidated tennis courts. At the 2006 census, Tinamba and the surrounding area had a population of 500. In 2007 Tinamba suffered two 1 in 100-year floods. Tinamba Railway Station Post Office opened on 1 July 1887 and was renamed Tinamba around 1895.

== See also ==
- Tinamba railway station
