= Cowwarr railway station =

Former railway station in Victoria, Australia

Coordinates: 38°00′51″S 146°41′38″E

Cowwarr
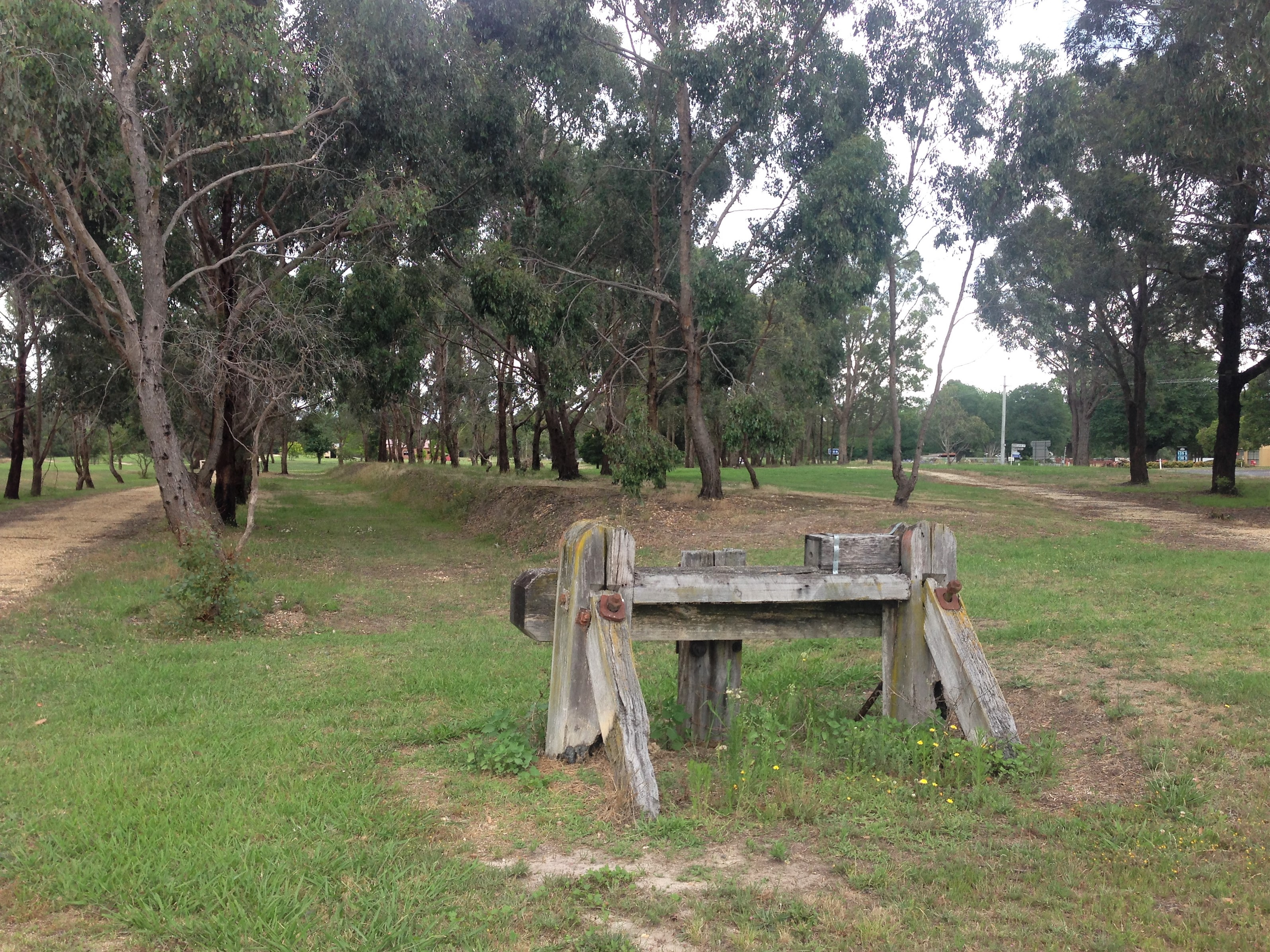
- Site of the former Cowwarr railway station in 2017

General information
- Line: Maffra
- Platforms: 1
- Tracks: 1

Other information
- Status: Closed

History
- Opened: 1883
- Closed: 1986

Services
Preceding station	Disused railways	Following station
Toongabbie	Maffra line	Dawson
List of closed railway stations in Victoria
Location

Cowwarr is a closed station located in the town of Cowwarr, on the Maffra railway line in Victoria, Australia.

== History ==
The station opened in 1883 with the construction of the line from Traralgon to Heyfield and was 184 km from Southern Cross.

A telegraph office operated at the station from around 1910 to 1916. In 1915, there was a derailment that occurred at the station. In 1927, the amount of revenue derived from the station was £3984. The station closed in 1986.
