= Briagolong railway line =

Closed railway line in Victoria, Australia

Briagolong

Overview
- Status: Closed
- Owner: Victorian Railways (VR) (1889–1952)
- Locale: Victoria, Australia
- Termini: Maffra; Briagolong
- Former connections: Maffra
- Stations: 4 former stations; 1 former siding

Service
- Type: Former Victorian Railways passenger service

History
- Opened: 7 August 1889
- Closed: 16 July 1952

Technical
- Line length: 19.947 km (12.394 mi)
- Number of tracks: Single
- Track gauge: 1,600 mm (5 ft 3 in)

Interactive map of the Briagolong railway line. Click full screen icon if not displaying.

The Briagolong railway line is a closed railway line in Victoria, Australia, which ran from Maffra to Briagolong. It opened in 1889 as a branch of the Maffra railway line, and was closed in 1952.

== History ==
=== Before line construction (1872-1889) ===
In July 1872, a request was made to the local shire president that a meeting be held on the prospect of a rail line to Briagolong, with a petition organised by Michael Feely and Michael Landy of Stratford, along with Briagolong residents. In around 1877, the Stratford Railway League was making calls for a railway line from Welshpool to Omeo, passing through Sale, Stratford and Briagolong. December 1880 saw a public event held in Briagolong, headed by Landy, to hear the opinions of local residents, preceding a banquet to be held in Maffra.

The railway minister, Thomas Bent, visited Briagolong on 22 October 1881 and, according to the recollections of Marjorie Kelly, was "happy to grant Briagolong its railway". There was much debate over where the line was to originate — in Maffra or in Stratford. Ultimately, Premier Duncan Gillies proposed that the line commence at Maffra, and the Railway Construction Act 1884 provided for a line from Maffra to Briagolong. In 1885, 30 people attended a public meeting at which it was argued that Stratford and Briagolong had a closer connection with Stratford than Maffra. One attendee, John McDonald, said that there was a virtual desert between the towns of Stratford and Briagolong, whereas the landowner at Bushy Park intended to subdivide his land, which would cause a larger settlement being necessary to purchase the land.

Despite the fact that construction on the Maffra railway line had already begun, Stratford residents remained staunchly opposed to a rail connection between Maffra and Briagolong. At a meeting, they argued that a line from Stratford would only be a quarter of the cost of the Maffra proposal, due to the fact that no bridges would be required, and that the ground was more level. The Gippsland Farmers' Journal reported on 22 July 1887 that the Premier at the time, Duncan Gillies, responded to a request asking for the line to end in Stratford by saying that he "could not now see his way to propose any alteration in the route adopted from Maffra".

On 6 July 1888, David Munro and Co were given the contract for construction of the line, at a cost of £122,966. The first sod was turned in Briagolong 13 days later. In December 1888, a group of Briagolong residents gathered in the Mechanics Institute to advocate for extending the line to Dargo, which had been part of the Welshpool to Omeo proposal.

=== Operation (1889-1952) ===
The Briagolong railway line was opened on 7 August 1889. A flood of the Avon River on 3 August 1891 overflowed the bridge on the line, leading to its closure. Two weeks later, it was reported the bridge had been washed away, and that "a considerable sum of money" would be needed to replace it. The rebuilt bridge was reopened on 21 December 1891. The Avon River bridge flooded twice again in 1893 and 1894, until a new iron bridge (previous bridges had been wooden) was constructed in 1895.

The line was reopened again in 1897, and it was celebrated by a Maffra banquet. It was attended by Gippsland North MLA Allan McLean, who spoke about the history of the line. McLean said that the government led by Duncan Gillies had initially refused to put the Briagolong line on a costing estimates list for constructing rail lines across the state, but the Speaker had intervened to put it to a committee vote, owing to what McLean called "the splendid accumulation of statistics by the prominent residents of the district". The Railway Commissioner, according to McLean, successfully advised the government to put the Briagolong line on the estimates list without a vote, leading to the construction of the line.

In a 1909 Victorian Railways report, the Briagolong line was reported as costing £5138 per mile, excluding rolling stock. On 10 November 1911, a group of young people were brought before the Children's Court in Maffra, charged with putting obstacles on the railway line. Passenger services on the Briagolong line closed in November 1930. On 25 April 1936, a public meeting was held in the Shire of Maffra hall in regards to the "likely closing" of the railway line. G. Bennett, president of the Briagolong Progress Association, said that the closure of the line would have a serious effect on Briagolong. B. Kelly, a representative of Railway Commissioners, said that, while the line was not being closed, "some lines must eventually close themselves", and that if people did not use the line, it might have serious results. The railway line was closed on 16 July 1952.
