= Vernon Lanigan =

Australian rules footballer

Personal information
- Full name: Vernon John Lanigan
- Born: 4 September 1899; Maffra, Victoria
- Died: 14 July 1972 (aged 72); Box Hill, Victoria
- Original team: Maffra / Xavier College

Playing career^{1}
Years	Club	Games (Goals)
1920–21	South Melbourne	3 (0)
- ^{1} Playing statistics correct to the end of 1921.

Vernon John Lanigan (4 September 1899 – 14 July 1972) was an Australian rules footballer who played with South Melbourne in the Victorian Football League (VFL).

== Family ==
The son of John Lanigan (1977–1947), and Catherine Grace Lanigan (1877–1927), née Horstman, Vernon John Lanigan was born at Maffra on 4 September 1899.

He married Margaret Annie "Peggy" Barr, in Melbourne on 10 June 1939.

== Death ==
He died at Box Hill, Victoria on 14 July 1972.
