= Dawson railway station =

Former railway station in Victoria, Australia

Dawson
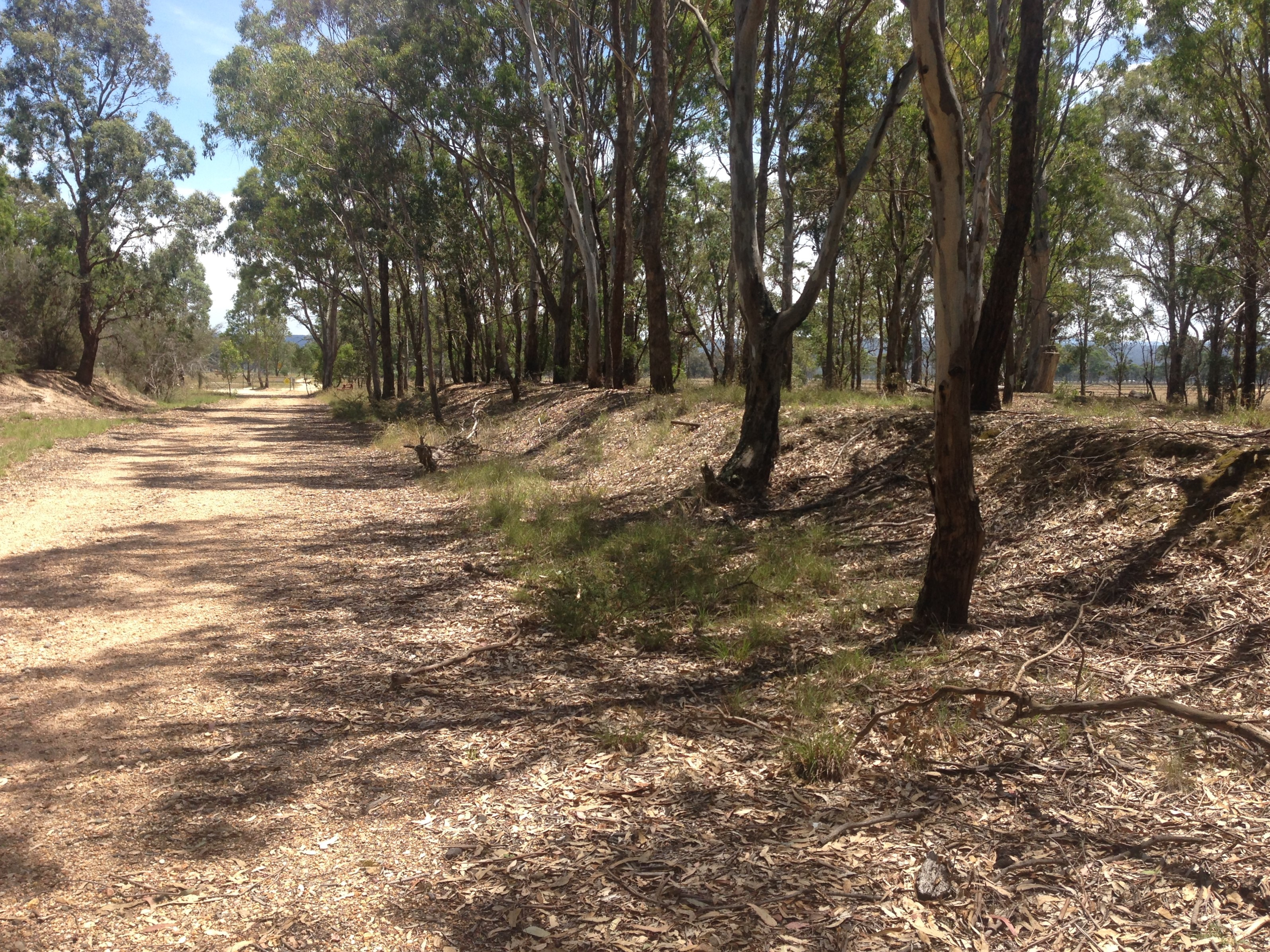
- Site of the former Dawson railway station in 2017

General information
- Line: Maffra
- Platforms: 1
- Tracks: 1

Other information
- Status: Closed

Services
Preceding station	Disused railways	Following station
Cowwarr	Maffra line	Heyfield
List of closed railway stations in Victoria

Dawson is a closed station located in the locality of Dawson on the Maffra railway line in Victoria, Australia.

== History ==
Opened in 1884, it was originally called Glenmaggie Railway Station, with the name changed to Dawson Railway Station about February 1888. The station building was burnt down in 1893, which was thought to be the act of burglars.

A post office operated at the station from 1884 until 1927, when it moved away.
