= Tinamba railway station =

Former railway station in Victoria, Australia

Coordinates: 37°57′53″S 146°53′40″E

Tinamba
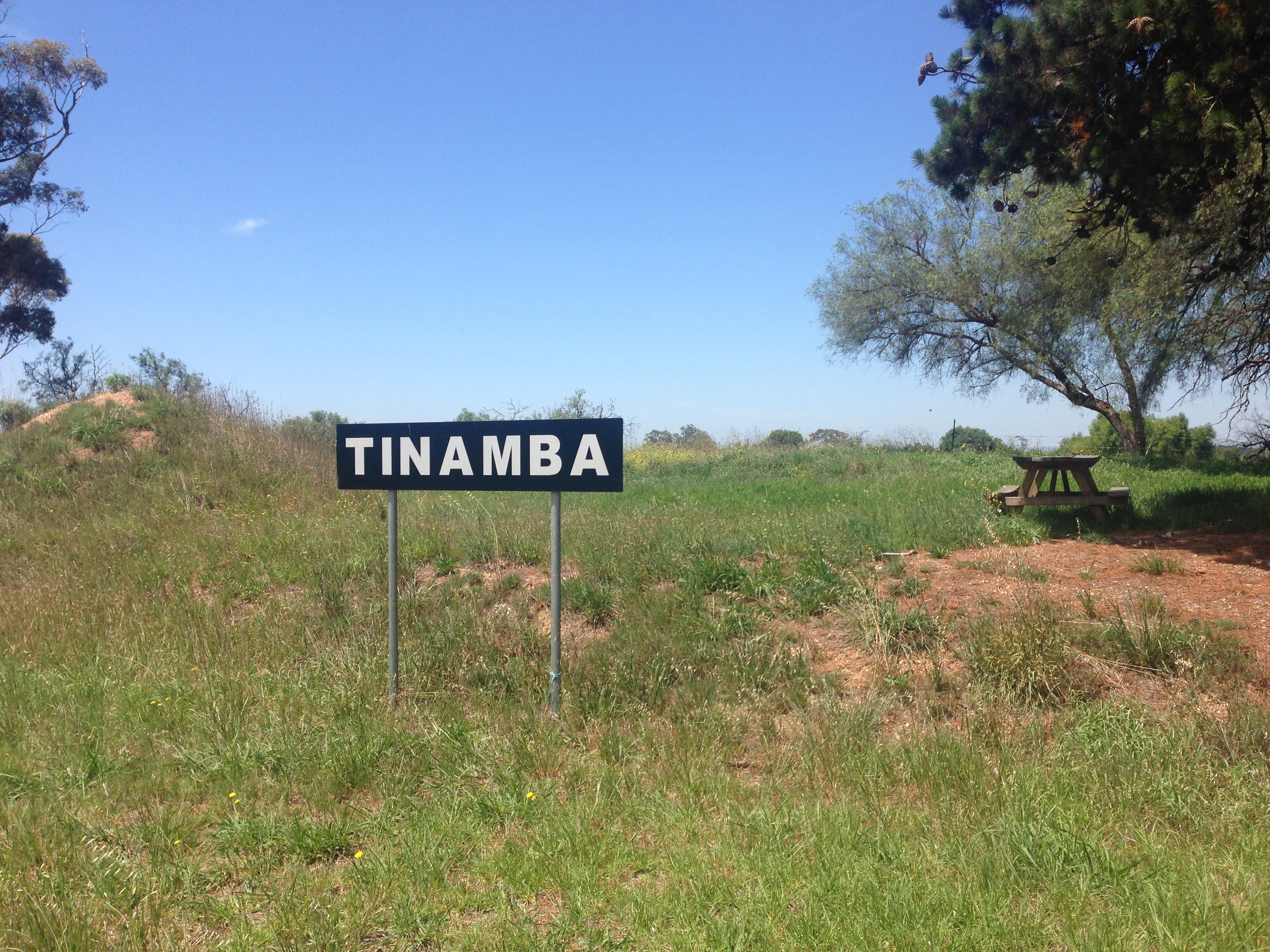
- Site of the former Tinamba station in 2017

General information
- Line: Maffra
- Platforms: 1
- Tracks: 1

Other information
- Status: Closed

History
- Closed: 1987

Services
| Preceding station | Disused railways | Following station |
|---|---|---|
| Heyfield | Maffra line | Maffra |
List of closed railway stations in Victoria
Location

Tinamba is a closed station located 10 km (6 mi) east of Heyfield, on the Maffra railway line in Victoria, Australia. It was 204 km (127 mi) from Southern Cross station.

== History ==
The first post office in the town was at the railway station, and was called Tinamba Railway Station Post Office. It opened on 1 July 1887. The post office was renamed Tinamba Post Office around 1895. In 1931, there was a collision between a truck and a train at the railway crossing near the station. While there were no injuries, the truck was badly damaged. The passenger platform was shortened in length to 46 metres in 1973.
