= Coongulla =

Coongulla Victoria
- Coordinates: 37°53′S 146°47′E
- Population: 183 (2016 census)
- Postcode(s): 3860
- Location: 215 km (134 mi) E of Melbourne; 53 km (33 mi) N of Traralgon; 25 km (16 mi) W of Maffra; 14 km (9 mi) N of Heyfield
- LGA(s): Shire of Wellington
- State electorate(s): Gippsland East
- Federal division(s): Gippsland

Coongulla is a town in Victoria, Australia, located on Ryans Road, on the shores of Lake Glenmaggie in the Shire of Wellington. The postcode for Coongulla and the surrounding towns is 3860. At the 2006 census, Coongulla and the surrounding area had a population of 183. Coongulla is 160 km from Melbourne.

There are approx 337 separate houses in Coongulla. Of the people in Coongulla, 83.6% are Australian-born. Of the immigrants, most are from the United Kingdom. Median age of persons in the town 57.

The Lake Glenmaggie Weir supplies irrigation water for all the farms in the area and also supplies drinking water to Maffra, Coongulla, Glenmaggie and Newry.

Some of the most common activities for locals and holidayers are: swimming, bike riding, canoeing or kayaking, yachting, bush-walking, water sports, and motorbike riding.

A Country Fire Authority brigade began services for the town and surrounds on 28 May 1972.

== Climate ==
The average January maximum temperature is 26°Celsius and in July it is 14 °C. The average January minimum temperature is 13 °C and dropping to 4 °C in July The average annual rainfall is 594 mm over an average of 115 rainy days.
