= 2013 Cherryville Bushfire =

The 2013 Cherryville Bushfire occurred on 9–11 May 2013 near the Adelaide Hills townships of Cherryville, Marble Hill and Basket Range, South Australia.

More than 250 Country Fire Service volunteers and four aerial water bombers were deployed to fight the fire. One house was destroyed, and the area burnt exceeded 650 hectares (1,600 acres). It began at about 2:30 p.m. on Thursday 9 May amid unseasonably warm weather when a private burn-off north of Cherryville became out of control and began to burn east into inaccessible country.

Warm temperatures, high winds, and heavy fuel loads contributed to the spread of the fire. Firefighters were initially unable to fight the fire directly, due to the inaccessibility of the terrain. Firefighters eventually managed to contain the fire around 5p.m. on 11 May, assisted by a change in the weather which brought approximately 10mm of rain.

The fire was notable in that it began over a week after the official fire-ban season ended. This prompted calls for the season to be extended into May; the Government announced on 12 May that a review of the policy would be conducted. However, concerns were raised that this would limit the ability of residents and the CFS to conduct fuel-reduction burns.
