= Maffra railway station =

Former railway station in Victoria, Australia

Coordinates: 37.97171°S 146.98039°E

Maffra
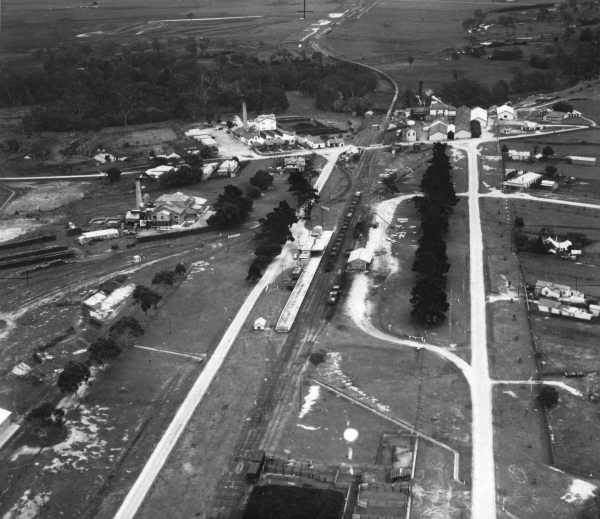
- Aerial view of Maffra in 1948, with the station prominent in the centre of the picture.

General information
- Lines: Maffra; Briagolong
- Platforms: 1
- Tracks: 1

Other information
- Status: Closed

History
- Closed: 1993

Services
Preceding station	Disused railways	Following station
Tinamba	Maffra line	Powerscourt
Terminus	Briagolong line	Boisdale
List of closed railway stations in Victoria
Location

Maffra was a major station located in the town of Maffra, on the now closed Maffra railway line in Victoria, Australia. It was 212 km from Southern Cross station.

== History ==
The line was opened in 1887 and in 1889, a branchline was constructed from Maffra to Briagolong. Rail passenger services between Traralgon and Maffra ceased in 1977 and regular freight trains ended in 1983, when through services from Orbost and Bairnsdale were routed via the parallel Traralgon–Sale–Stratford railway.

The rail line between Traralgon and Maffra was closed in stages from 1987, with Maffra station continued to be served by freight trains from Stratford intermittently until 1993. A number of special passenger trains visited Maffra on occasions, including a steam hauled service from Melbourne hauled by locomotive K153 in August 1990. The station remained staffed by a station master until the final closure and the rail tracks were removed over the next two years. The station precinct is now an industrial precinct and the former station building is used for community purposes.
