= Glenmaggie Dam =

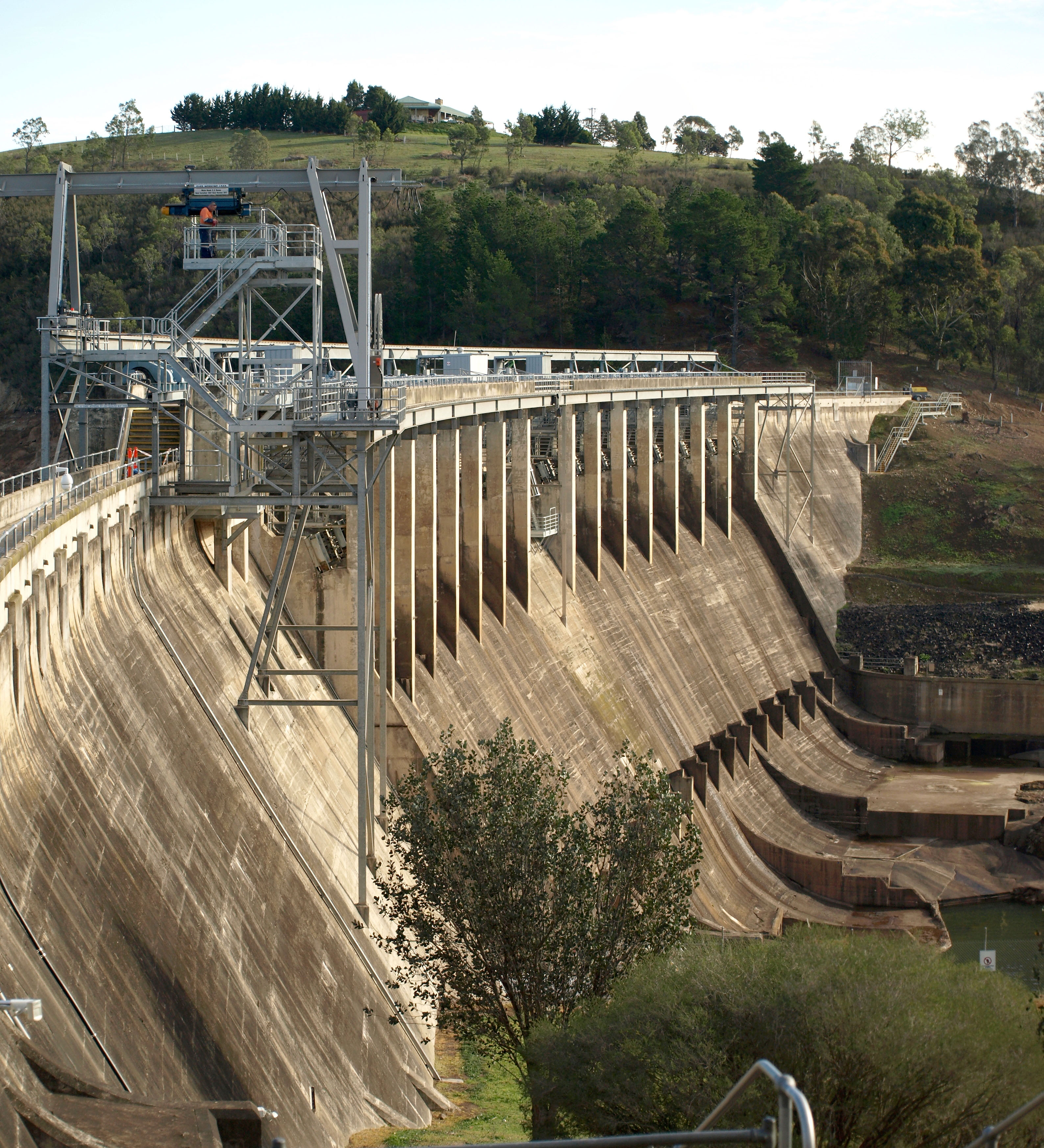
- Downstream face of the dam wall, 2017

- Location of the dam in Victoria
- Interactive map of Glenmaggie Dam
- Country: Australia
- Location: Sale, Central Gippsland, Victoria
- Coordinates: 37°54′17″S 146°48′00″E
- Purpose: Irrigation; Hydro-electric power; Water supply; Conservation
- Status: Operational
- Construction began: 1919
- Opening date: 1927
- Owner: Southern Rural Water

Dam and spillways
- Type of dam: Gravity dam
- Impounds: Macalister River
- Height: 37 m (121 ft)
- Length: 295 m (968 ft)
- Elevation at crest: 77 m (253 ft) AHD
- Width (crest): 99 m (325 ft)
- Dam volume: 77×10^{3} m^{3} (2.7×10^{6} cu ft)
- Spillways: 2
- Spillway type: Uncontrolled
- Spillway capacity: 3,400 m^{3}/s (120,000 cu ft/s)

Reservoir
- Creates: Lake Glenmaggie
- Total capacity: 190.410 GL (154,368 acre⋅ft)
- Active capacity: 177.628 GL (144,005 acre⋅ft)
- Inactive capacity: 4.86 GL (3,940 acre⋅ft)
- Catchment area: 1,891 km^{2} (730 sq mi)
- Surface area: 1,760 ha (4,300 acres)

Glenmaggie Power Station
- Commission date: 1994
- Turbines: 2 × Francis-type
- Installed capacity: 4 MW (5,400 hp)
- Annual generation: 9 GWh (32 TJ)

The Glenmaggie Dam is a concrete block-foundation gravity dam with fourteen radial arm gates across the Macalister River, located near Maffra, Central Gippsland, in the Australian state of Victoria. The dam's purpose includes irrigation, the generation of hydro-electric power, water supply and conservation. The impounded reservoir is called Lake Glenmaggie.

== Dam and reservoir overview ==
=== Dam ===
Construction of the Glenmaggie Dam commenced in 1919, was completed in 1927 and constructed by the State Rivers and Water Supply Commission of Victoria. The concrete dam wall is 37 metres (121 ft) high and 295 metres (968 ft) long. When full, the reservoir has a capacity of 132,000 megalitres (107,000 acre⋅ft). The mass-concrete overfall dam has irrigation outlets on both sides of the river serving irrigation channels. The central portion is an overfall spillway. The dam wall was raised in 1958 by the addition of gates; stabilised using ground anchors in 1989; and upgraded in 2003 to enable it to withstand overtopping.

=== Reservoir ===
The reservoir provided irrigation to approximately 360 square kilometres (140 sq mi) of farming land in the Central Gippsland region; via a gravity irrigation systems to properties in the Macalister Irrigation District, near the towns of Maffra, Heyfield, Stratford and Sale. The Macalister Irrigation District covers approximately 53,000 hectares (130,000 acres) around the Macalister and Thomson rivers, extending from Lake Glenmaggie to Sale. It comprises two areas: the Maffra-Sale Irrigation Area to the north of the Thomson River and the Central Gippsland Area (including the Nambrok-Denison Soldier Settlement district) to the south.

In June 2007, the Macalister catchment experienced record flooding. Inflows into Lake Glenmaggie peaked in excess of 250,000 megalitres (200,000 acre⋅ft) per day and releases peaked at 147,000 megalitres (119,000 acre⋅ft) per day. A second flood occurred in November 2007 with inflows into Lake Glenmaggie peaking at 70,000 megalitres (57,000 acre⋅ft) per day and releases peaking at 59,000 megalitres (48,000 acre⋅ft) per day. Repairs totaling around A$4 million were completed after the June and November 2007 floods.

== Hydroelectric power station ==
In 1994, a hydro-electric power station with two Francis turbine-generators was commissioned, with a capacity of 4 megawatts (5,400 hp) and generating 9 gigawatt-hours (32 TJ) per annum.

== Ghost sightings and local culture ==
There is a local legend that the lake is haunted by a ghost by the name of Matilda Power who died in an unfortunate accident back in 1939. It's rumoured that her ghost roams the shores to this day looking for her car that was lost in over 14 feet of water. Local ghost hunters say that she's often spotted by the lake at the end of Gillum Road, particularly in March each year.

== See also ==
- Irrigation in Australia
- List of dams and reservoirs in Victoria
- List of power stations in Victoria
