= Briagolong railway station =

Former railway station in Victoria, Australia

Coordinates: 37.84645°S 147.07018°E

Briagolong

General information
- Line: Briagolong
- Platforms: 1
- Tracks: 1

Other information
- Status: Closed

History
- Opened: 1889
- Closed: 1952

Services
Preceding station	Disused railways	Following station
Bushy Park	Briagolong line	Terminus
List of closed railway stations in Victoria
Location

Briagolong railway station is a closed railway station located in the town of Briagolong, at the terminus of the Briagolong railway line in Victoria, Australia.

== History ==
The station opened concurrently with the Briagolong railway line in 1889, and was 232 km from Southern Cross. In 1903, it was announced that the Railway Department intended to place a woman in charge of the station, which was objected to by the Maffra Spectator, who remarked that "the work at the station requires the service of a man, and it is to be hoped that the Department will speedily recognise this, and not place work on a woman which she could not carry out".

By 1920, the Railway Commissioners had declined to appoint a stationmaster for Briagolong, due to the traffic at the station not warranting it. In early 1940, a firewood plant alongside several trucks of wood at Briagolong station were destroyed by a fire, with the loss estimated to be £200. The station closed in 1952. The raised embankment and sections that made up the base of the railway line can still be seen at the site of the station today, as well as an indentation in the ground where the turntable used to be located.
