= Licola, Victoria =

Licola
- Town
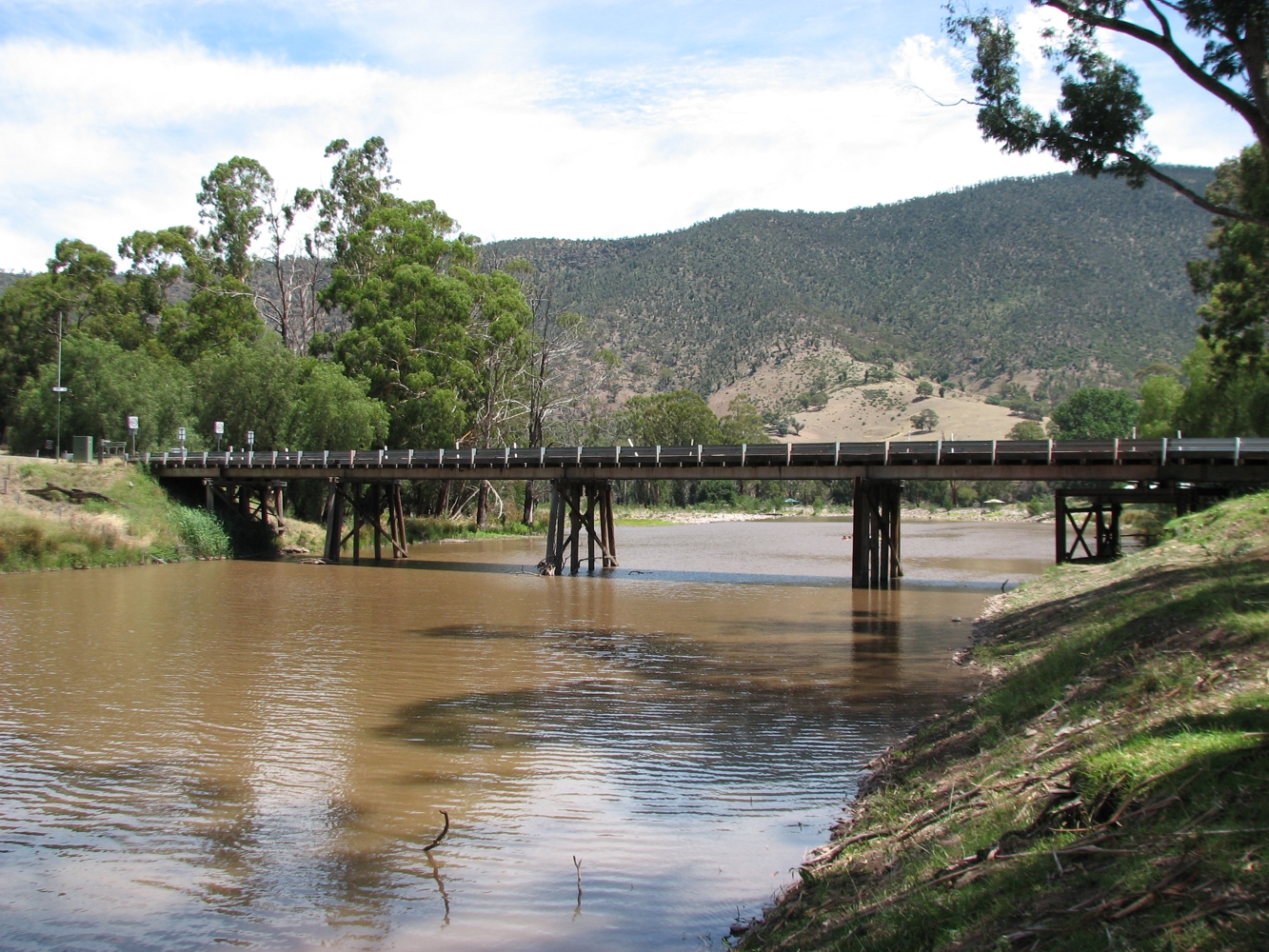
- Bridge over the Macalister River

- Coordinates: 37°38′S 146°37′E
- Country: Australia
- State: Victoria
- LGA: Shire of Wellington
- Location: 248 km (154 mi) E of Melbourne; 86 km (53 mi) N of Traralgon; 45 km (28 mi) N of Coongulla

Government
  - State electorate: Gippsland East
  - Federal division: Gippsland

Population
  - Total: 7 (2021 census)
- Postcode: 3858

Licola is a locality in Victoria, Australia, located on Licola Road, in the Shire of Wellington, 254 kilometres east of Melbourne. At the 2021 census, Licola had no people or a very low population. Recent reports of ongoing sales suggest a population of five inhabitants.

== Overview ==
The Lions Clubs of Victoria and Southern NSW owns a large section of land in Licola and operates a youth camp on site, the Licola Wilderness Village, which is immediately surrounded by farm land. The town is the southern gateway to the Alpine National Park. Its main industries are tourism, logging and farming. It has one general store including post office and petrol station and a small number of houses. It is also the only Victorian town not connected to the mains electricity grid, generating its own power. The town is frequented by motorbike riders, campers and hikers alike.

== History ==
The first Licola Post Office opened on 14 September 1908 and was renamed Glenfalloch in 1912. A Licola Post Office was again open 1914–1919, 1920–1923 and 1954–1993.

In July 2007, Licola suffered serious floods which caused a great deal of damage to roads, farms and national park areas. The main road from Heyfield was closed for two months following the destruction of the heritage-listed Cheynes Bridge, which was subsequently rebuilt.

According to media reports, the village is up for sale in 2026 for about 10 million Australian dollars.
