= Glenmaggie =

Glenmaggie Victoria
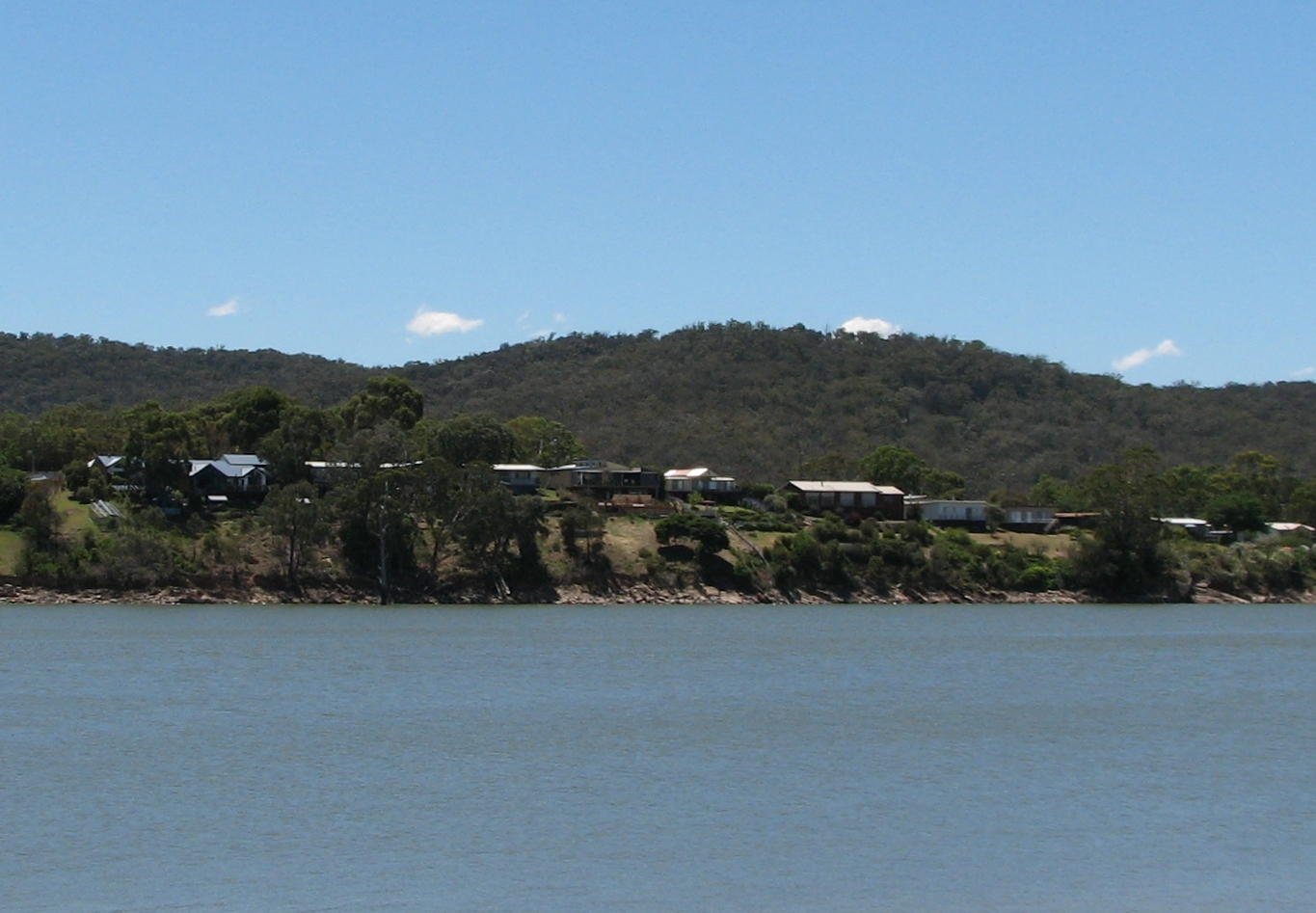
- Lake Glenmaggie

- Coordinates: 37°54′S 146°45′E
- Population: 277 (2016 census)
- Postcode(s): 3858
- Location: 213 km (132 mi) E of Melbourne; 50 km (31 mi) NE of Traralgon; 31 km (19 mi) NW of Maffra
- LGA(s): Shire of Wellington
- State electorate(s): Gippsland East
- Federal division(s): Gippsland

Glenmaggie is a town in Victoria, Australia, located on the shores of Lake Glenmaggie, in the Shire of Wellington. At the 2016 census, Glenmaggie and the surrounding area had a population of 277.

Glenmaggie Post Office opened on 1 January 1872 and closed in 1986.

Lake Glenmaggie is popular for waterskiing and boating. On 14 March 1942, a RAAF Wirraway crashed into the lake, killing the pilot.
