= Cherryville, South Australia =

Cherryville
- Town
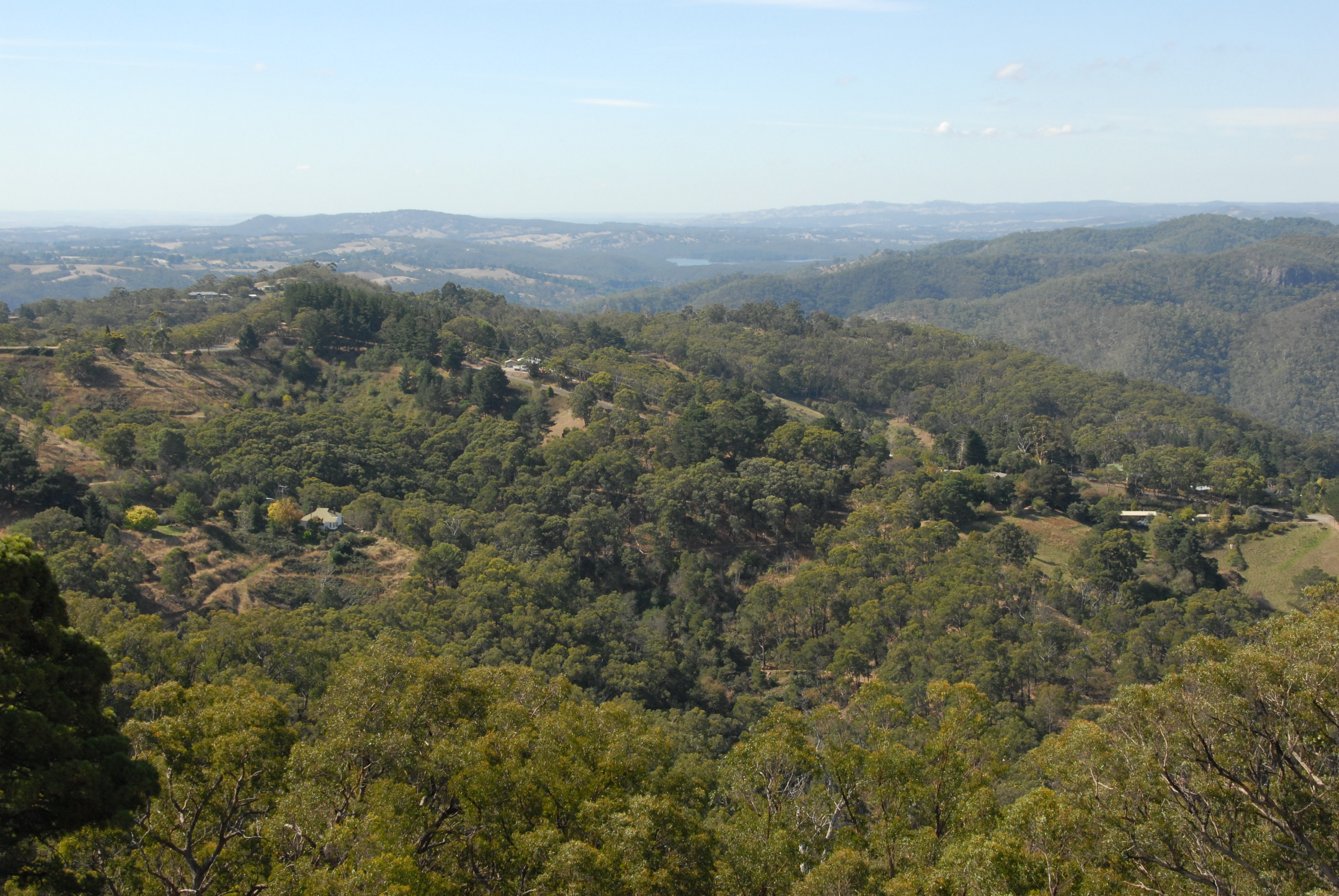
- The town of Cherryville seen from Marble Hill

- Coordinates: 34°54′43″S 138°45′55″E
- Country: Australia
- State: South Australia
- LGA: Adelaide Hills Council
- Location: 15 km (9.3 mi) from Adelaide
- Established: 1840

Government
  - State electorate: Heysen
  - Federal division: Mayo
- Elevation: 493 m (1,617 ft)

Population
  - Total: 125 (SAL 2021)
- Postcode: 5134

Cherryville is a small town in the Adelaide Hills, South Australia. It was named around 1840 after the native cherry trees that grew in the area, although some historians claim that it was not named until 1892, when horticultural cherry plantings became widespread in the area. Prior to this, land holdings were typically of around 100 acres (40 ha) and used primarily for pastoralism or small-scale vegetable gardens.

Cherryville Post Office opened on 2 January 1899 and closed in 1974.

The town received national attention in May 2013 when the 2013 Cherryville bushfire burnt out 670 hectares (1,700 acres) of scrub and farmland surrounding the district. The fire was notable in that it occurred outside the fire-ban season, leading to calls to review the State's fire ban policy.
