= Heyfield railway station =

Former railway station in Victoria, Australia

Coordinates: 37°58′52.68″S 146°47′8.12″E

Heyfield
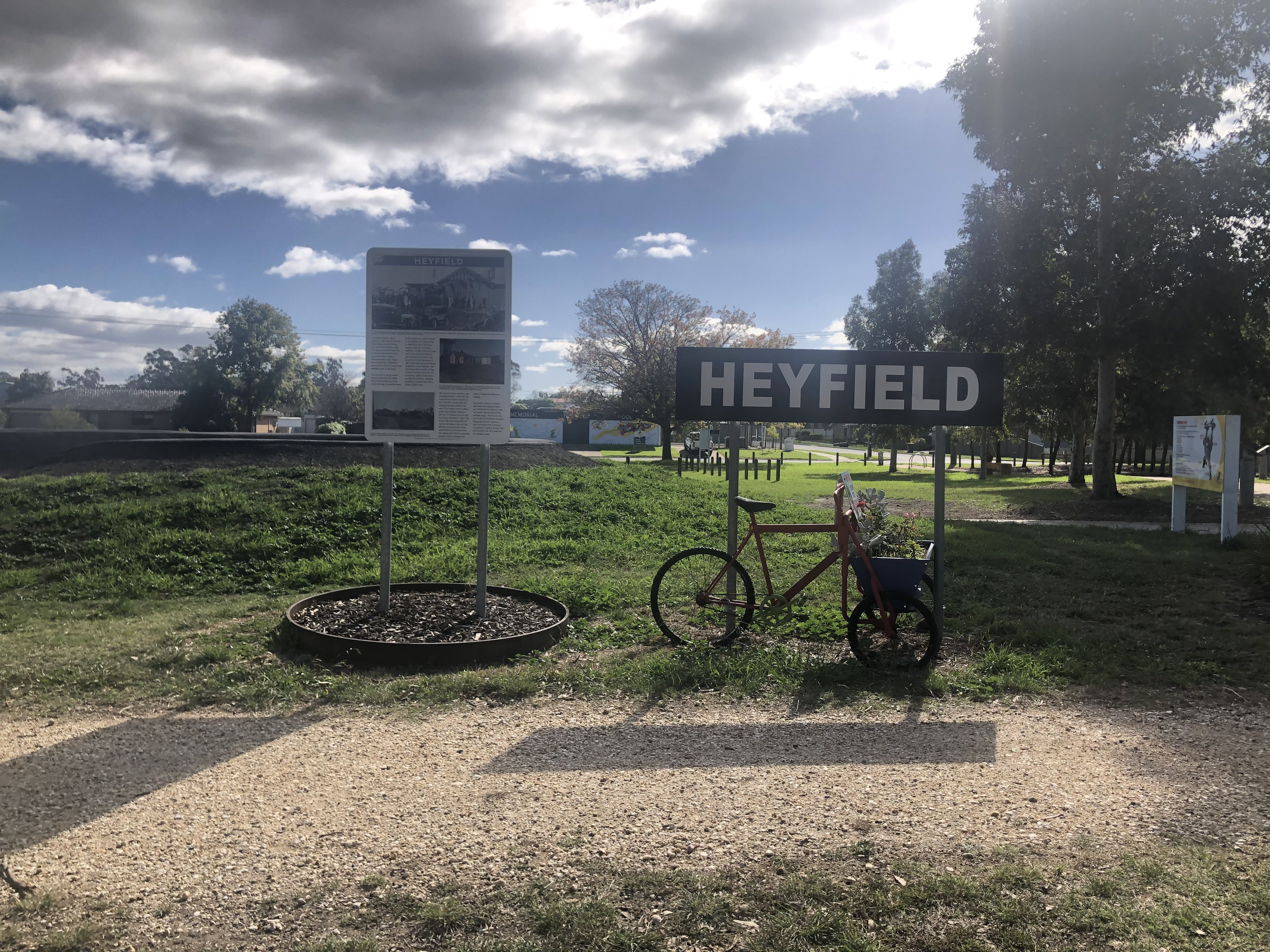
- Former site of the Heyfield railway station in 2021

General information
- Line: Maffra
- Platforms: 1
- Tracks: 1

Other information
- Status: Closed

History
- Opened: 1883
- Closed: 1987

Services
Preceding station	Disused railways	Following station
Dawson	Maffra line	Tinamba
List of closed railway stations in Victoria
Location

Heyfield is a closed station located in the town of Heyfield, on the Maffra railway line in Victoria, Australia.

== History ==
Heyfield station opened in 1883 with the construction of the line from Traralgon to Heyfield and was 195 km from Southern Cross. Heyfield station saw added traffic during the 1920s, as the Glenmaggie Weir was being built. A tramline was also constructed from Heyfield to the site of the weir. In 1926, a wagon driver named Richard Gourge died at the station after being hit by a wagon. The death was ruled to be accidental. The station closed in 1987.
