= Seaton, Victoria =

Seaton
- Town
- Coordinates: 37.933°S 146.667°E
- Country: Australia
- State: Victoria
- LGA: Shire of Wellington
- Location: 204 km (127 mi) E of Melbourne; 41 km (25 mi) N of Traralgon; 14 km (8.7 mi) WNW of Heyfield

Government
  - State electorate: Gippsland East
  - Federal division: Gippsland

Population
  - Total: 161
- Postcode: 3858

Seaton is a locality in the Gippsland region of Victoria, Australia, located in the Shire of Wellington, 204 kilometres (127 mi) east of the state capital, Melbourne. The town has a population of 161 people as of 2021, up from a population of 157 in 2016.

The Post Office opened on 1 December 1862 as Bald Hills (Gippsland), was renamed Seaton in 1879, and closed in 1967.
