= Newry, Victoria =

Newry
- Town
- Coordinates: 37°55′S 146°53′E
- Country: Australia
- State: Victoria
- LGA: Shire of Wellington
- Location: 219 km (136 mi) E of Melbourne; 31 km (19 mi) NW of Traralgon; 12 km (7.5 mi) NW of Maffra

Government
  - State electorate: Gippsland East
  - Federal division: Gippsland

Population
  - Total: 427 (2016 census)
- Postcode: 3859

Newry is a town in Victoria, Australia, located on Newry - Boisdale Road, northwest of Maffra, in the Shire of Wellington. In 2016 the town had a population of 427. It was named for the town Newry, Ireland.

== History ==
The first survey of the area was conducted in 1860 by W. Dawson. A fresh survey was conducted in 1861 by C. P. Rafferty, and further surveying was performed by G. Hastings in 1863. The survey by Rafferty set aside occupied land for a township reserve, which was surveyed into blocks by G.T. Jones in 1867. 16 blocks were sold in 1867, and blocks were sold again in 1871.

The Post Office opened on 1 February 1869 as Upper Maffra and was renamed Maffra Upper in 1889 and Newry in 1894. A brick church was built in 1885.

== Sport ==
Golfers play at the course of the Newry Golf Club on Three Chain Road.

== Notable people ==
- Craig Huffer — sub 4-minute miler
- Bill Young — VFL footballer & Coleman Medalist
