= Maffra railway line =

Former railway line in Victoria, Australia

Maffra railway

Overview
- Status: Closed

History
- Opened: 1883–1887
- Closed: 1986: Traralgon to Cowwarr; 1994: Cowwarr to Maffra

The Maffra railway line is a closed railway line in Victoria, Australia. The line provided an alternative route to East Gippsland than the current route to Sale. The line was closed in stages from Traralgon to Cowwarr in 1986, and from Cowwarr to Maffra in 1994. In its latter years, the main purpose of the line was to serve dairy industries at Maffra.

The last passenger service from Traralgon to Maffra was run by a 153hp Walker railmotor on 7 July 1977. A replacement bus service started two days later. The last freight service on the line ran on 8 September 1994. It was an up goods to Sale, with locomotive N472 hauling a single container wagon and rail tractor RT49.
