= Maffra =

- Town
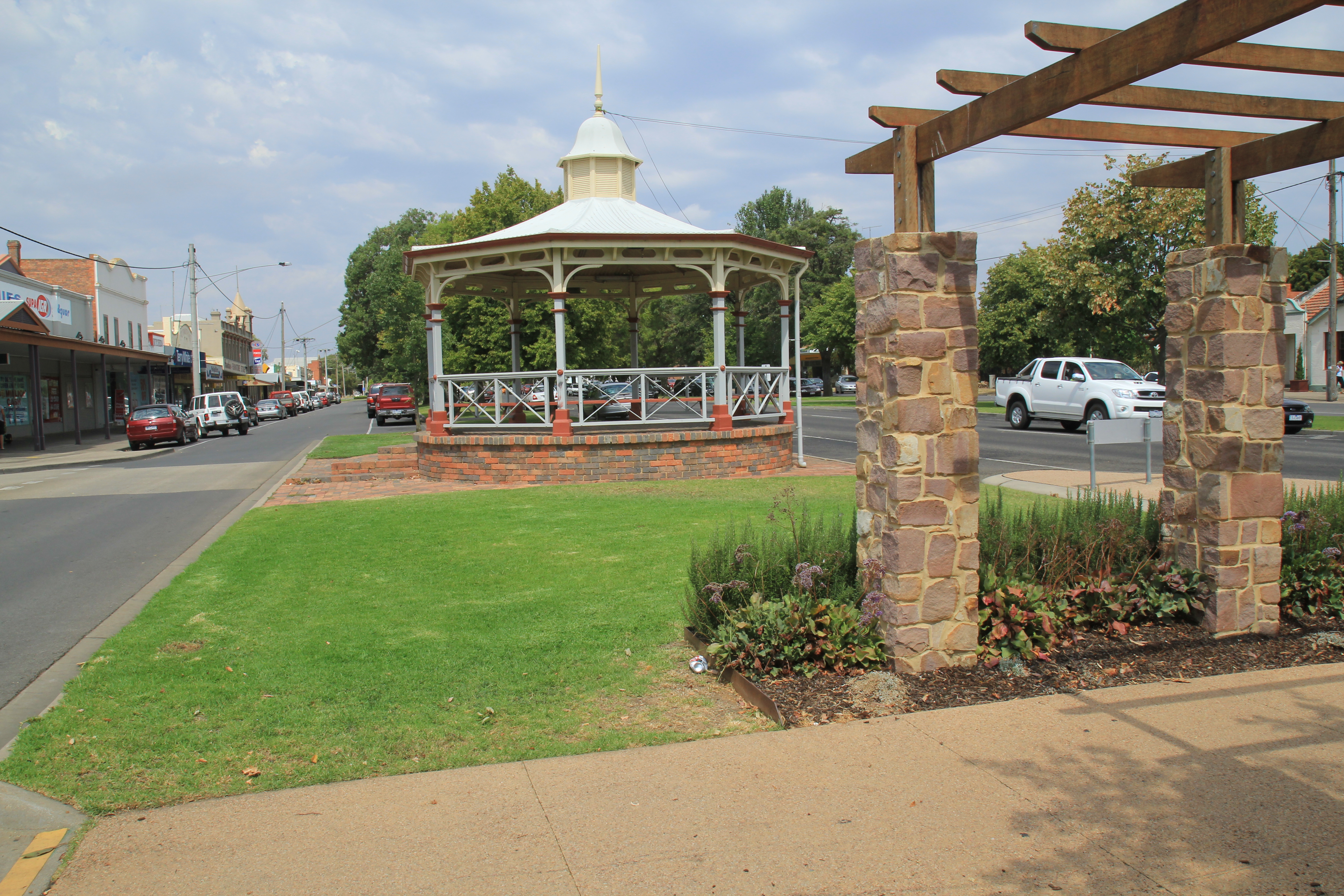
- Maffra streetscape, 2013

- Coordinates: 37°57′S 146°59′E
- Country: Australia
- State: Victoria
- LGA: Shire of Wellington
- Location: 221 km (137 mi) E of Melbourne; 12 km (7.5 mi) W of Stratford; 17 km (11 mi) NW of Sale; 62 km (39 mi) W of Bairnsdale

Government
  - State electorate: Gippsland East
  - Federal division: Gippsland

Area
  - Total: 82.4 km^{2} (31.8 sq mi)
- Elevation: 27 m (89 ft)

Population
  - Total: 5,384 (2021 census)
  - Density: 65.34/km^{2} (169.23/sq mi)
- Postcode: 3860
- Mean max temp: 20.0 °C (68.0 °F)
- Mean min temp: 8.1 °C (46.6 °F)
- Annual rainfall: 581.9 mm (22.91 in)

Maffra is a town in Victoria, Australia, 220 kilometres (140 mi) east of Melbourne. It is in the Shire of Wellington local government area and it is the second most populous city of the Shire. It relies mainly on dairy farming and other agriculture, and was the site of one of Murray Goulburn Co-operative's eight processing plants in Victoria. Maffra is a detour off the Princes Highway and is near Sale, Stratford, Newry, Tinamba, Heyfield and Rosedale. At the 2016 census, Maffra had a population of 4,316.

== History ==
The town began as an outstation of the region's first cattle run, Boisdale, named by pioneer grazier Lachlan Macalister after a village on the island of South Uist in the Outer Hebrides, Scotland. The town appears to have taken its name from a group of squatters from Maffra, a village in the Monaro region of NSW, with its location between current Maffra and Newry being written on an early map. The squatters moved on, but the name remained. The Monaro Maffra was probably connected to Mafra, a town in Portugal.

The township was settled in the 1860s, with the Post Office opening on 20 July 1864. Maffra railway station on the Maffra railway line opened in 1887. The last regular passenger service ran in 1977. The station area is now an industrial precinct and the former station building is used for community purposes. The Gippsland Plains Rail Trail is a 67 km recreational trail following the former Gippsland Plains railway line and passes through Maffra.

Maffra was long the beef cattle capital of West Gippsland and, for many years, the only beet sugar processing centre in the country. The Beet Museum, set in the Port of Maffra Park, has relics from the defunct sugar beet industry. The building is a relocated historic weighbridge building, and is lined with pine boards from the home of Charles and Grace Quirk, one of Maffra's first cottages.

== Today ==
Maffra hosts a Mardi Gras every March, the Maffra and District Agricultural, Pastoral and Horticultural Show in October and a tennis tournament at Easter.

The Wellington Shire Council removed a row of 100+ year old trees that line the main street because of disease, but has since replaced them with young oaks.

Maffra has two primary schools, the Maffra Primary School and St Mary's Primary School (Catholic). Maffra also has a public secondary school, Maffra Secondary College, which has a student enrolment of around 700. Maffra Secondary has a strong academic program and is involved in a number of community service programs.

=== Plant toxicity for dogs ===
In July 2021, Victoria had over 50 pet dogs suffering liver toxicity, with 14 dogs known to have died from the condition. The source of the issue was traced to indospicine sourced from Indigofera spicata plants. Many of the dogs had eaten raw pet food sourced from a knackery at Maffra. No specific source for the contamination was immediately identified, as these plants are not normally found in southern Australia. This toxicity has previously been seen in dogs fed meat from Australian feral camels, common in northern Australia.

== Sport ==
The town has an Australian Rules football team competing in the Gippsland Football League. Its senior side was at one point the most successful in the league, winning 6 premierships in the early 2000s.

Maffra is also home to a field hockey club, fielding junior, women's and men's teams in the East Gippsland Hockey Association playing at Cameron Sports Complex, Morison Street. Also at this complex, is Maffra's Amateur Basketball Association. This hosts junior and senior teams, as well as Men and Women's CBL teams.

Golfers play at the course of the Maffra Golf Club on Fulton Road.

The soccer community in Maffra was also the driving force behind the formation of the North Gippsland Soccer Association in 1925, which originally proposed teams in Maffra, Sale, Nambrook and Bairnsdale. Ultimately, Maffra Soccer Club was joined by Yallourn SC, Sale United SC and Glenmaggie Soccer Club - although the onset of the World War II saw the league halted. This league helped form the early footprint of what later evolved into the Latrobe Valley Soccer League.

== Events and attractions ==
The Berry Dairy is a seasonal agritourism business located on a working dairy farm near Maffra. It includes pick-your-own strawberries, an on-site café, children's play areas, a petting zoo and farm tractor tours. In 2025, the business Silver in the Excellence in Food Tourism category at the Victorian Tourism Awards.

== Notable people ==
- Bill Bennett, AFL player, member of Carlton Football Club
- Sam Berry, AFL player with Adelaide Football Club
- John Butcher, former AFL player with Port Adelaide Football Club
- John Hipwell, Australian architect
- Shane Watts, former world champion off-road motorcycle racer
- Max Knobel, AFL player with Fremantle Football Club
