= Heyfield =

- Town
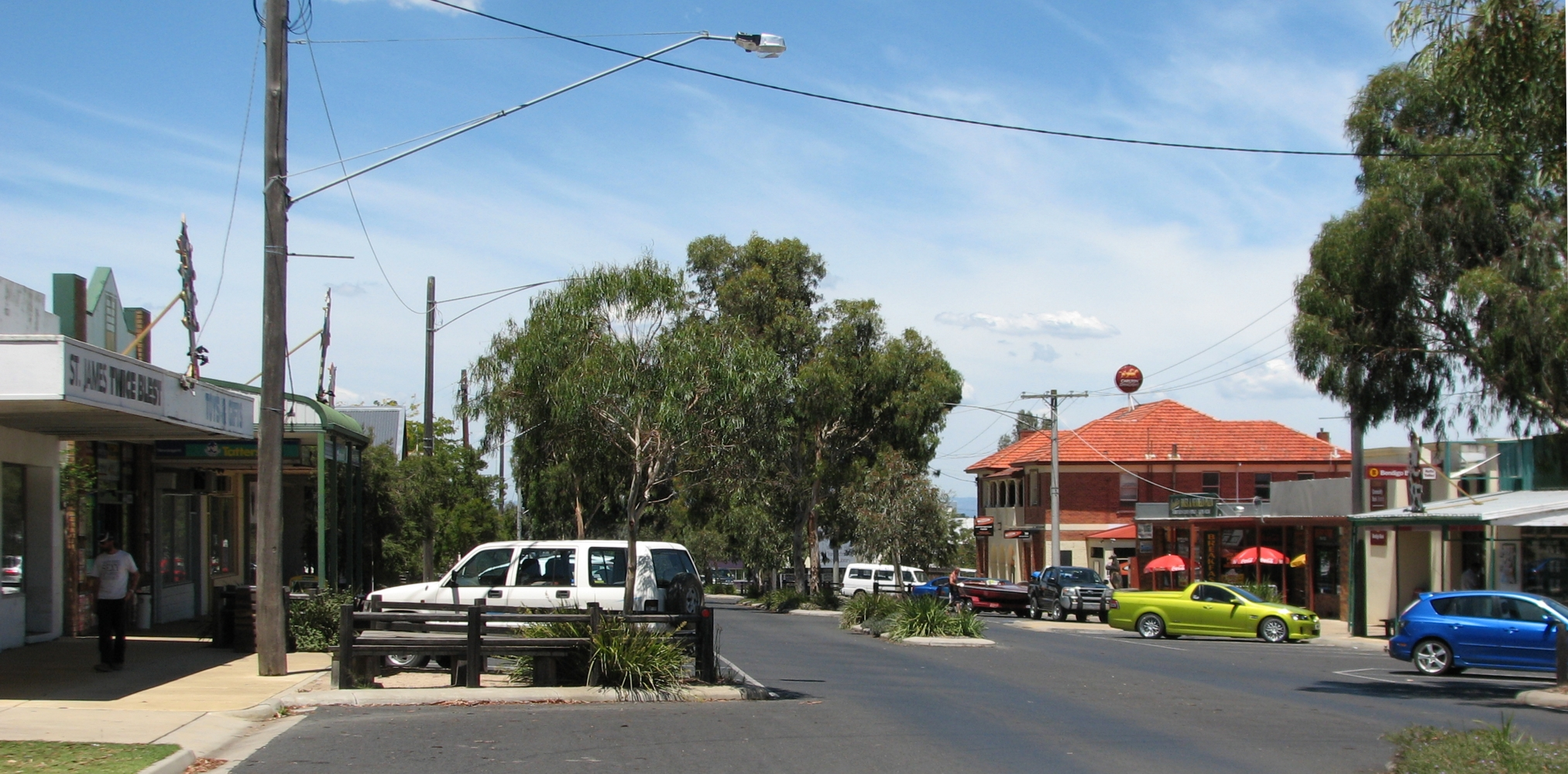
- Temple Street

- Coordinates: 37°59′S 146°47′E
- Country: Australia
- State: Victoria
- LGA: Shire of Wellington
- Location: 206 km (128 mi) E of Melbourne; 36 km (22 mi) NW of Sale; 21 km (13 mi) W of Maffra

Government
  - State electorate: Gippsland East
  - Federal division: Gippsland

Population
  - Total: 2,050 (2021 census)
- Postcode: 3858

Heyfield is a town in Victoria, Australia, with a population of 2050. It is 206 kilometres (128 mi) east of Melbourne, in the Shire of Wellington local government area. Located on the Thomson River, Heyfield is a gateway to the Victorian High Country.

== History ==
In 1841 an early settler, James McFarlane, described the district as resembling "a field of waving corn", and called it "Hayfield". By 1866, the spelling had changed to "Heyfield", but exactly when and why this happened is unclear. It may have been renamed to reflect the spelling of the nearby Heyfield Station.

In 1866, McFarlane's property was taken over by James Tyson, a former member of the Queensland Legislative Council, a pastoralist, and considered Australia's first self-made millionaire.

The town was a stopping point for diggers on their way to the Gippsland goldfields.

The Post Office opened on 24 September 1870.

The author Mary Grant Bruce started writing her Billabong series of books in 1910 while staying at James Tyson's former house.

The poet Shaw Neilson spent some time in the Heyfield area in the 1920s, where he wrote several poems and helped in the construction of the Lake Glenmaggie weir wall.

The Heyfield Magistrates' Court closed on 1 January 1983, not having been visited by a Magistrate since 1970.

It is today known for its agriculture and timber production. It is the principal source of hardwood in Victoria, and the largest timber mill in the Southern Hemisphere, Australian Sustainable Hardwoods, is located there. The district's irrigation water comes from Lake Glenmaggie.

During the Gippsland bushfires in December 2006 and January 2007, the town was used as a staging area by the networked fire agencies, being, the Department of Sustainability and Environment (DSE), Country Fire Authority (CFA), Victoria Police, and the Victorian State Emergency Service (SES).

A skatepark was built in Heyfield in December 2005.

Heyfield and surrounding areas were impacted by severe flash floods twice during winter and spring in 2007. The Thomson River burst its banks and rendered the road out of Heyfield impassable.

== Sport ==
The town has an Australian Rules football team competing in the North Gippsland Football League.

Heyfield Soccer Club was one of the founding members of the Latrobe Valley Soccer League in 1951. They finished runner-up in the competition's first ever season.

Golfers play at the course of the Heyfield Golf Club on Golflinks Road.

== Notable people ==
- Wil Anderson - Australian stand-up comedian and TV and radio personality
- David Wojcinski - Geelong FC Player.
- Leigh Brown - Retired Collingwood FC Player. Melbourne FC assistant coach.
- Brent Macaffer - Collingwood FC Player.

== Gallery ==
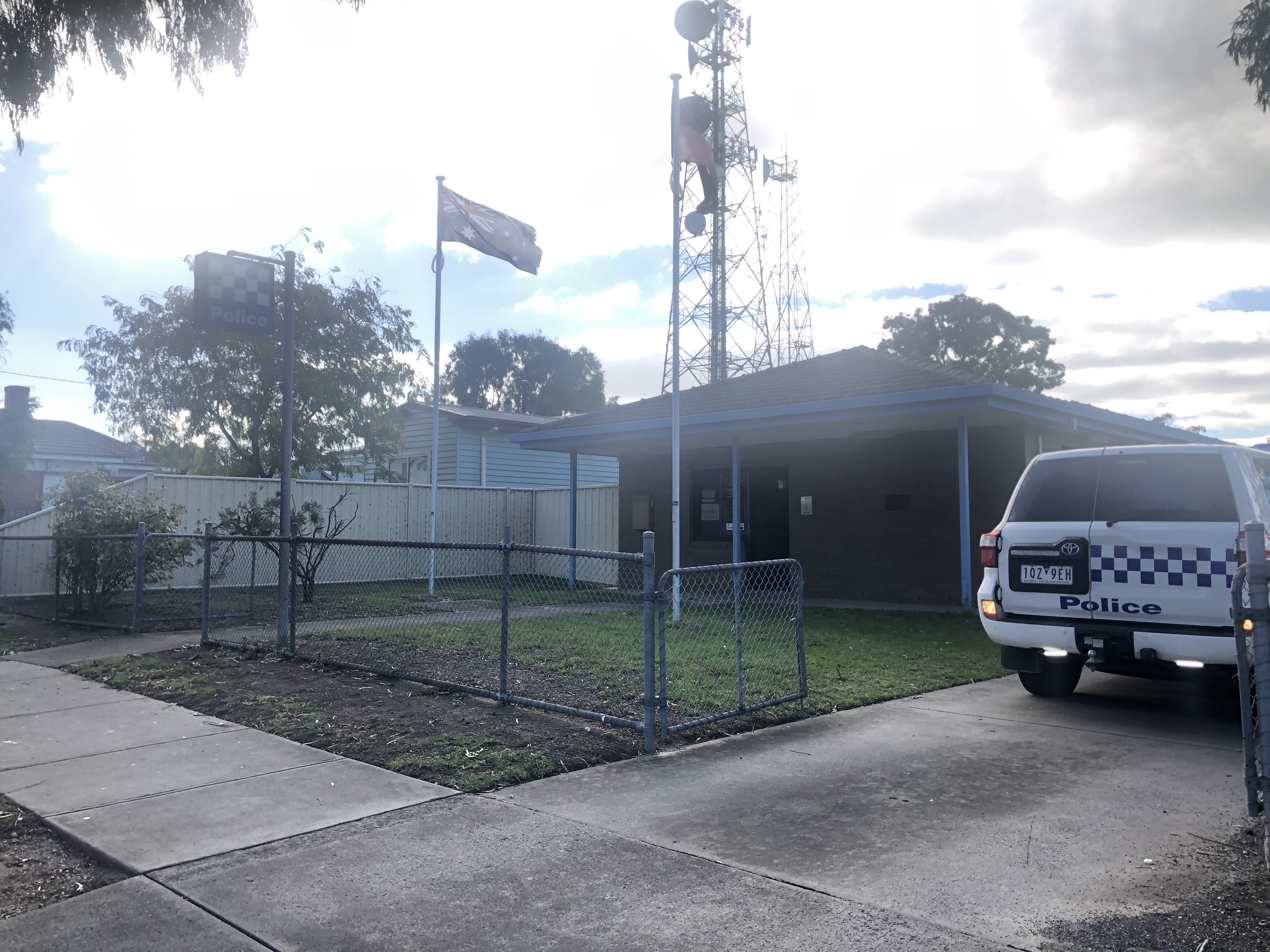
Police station

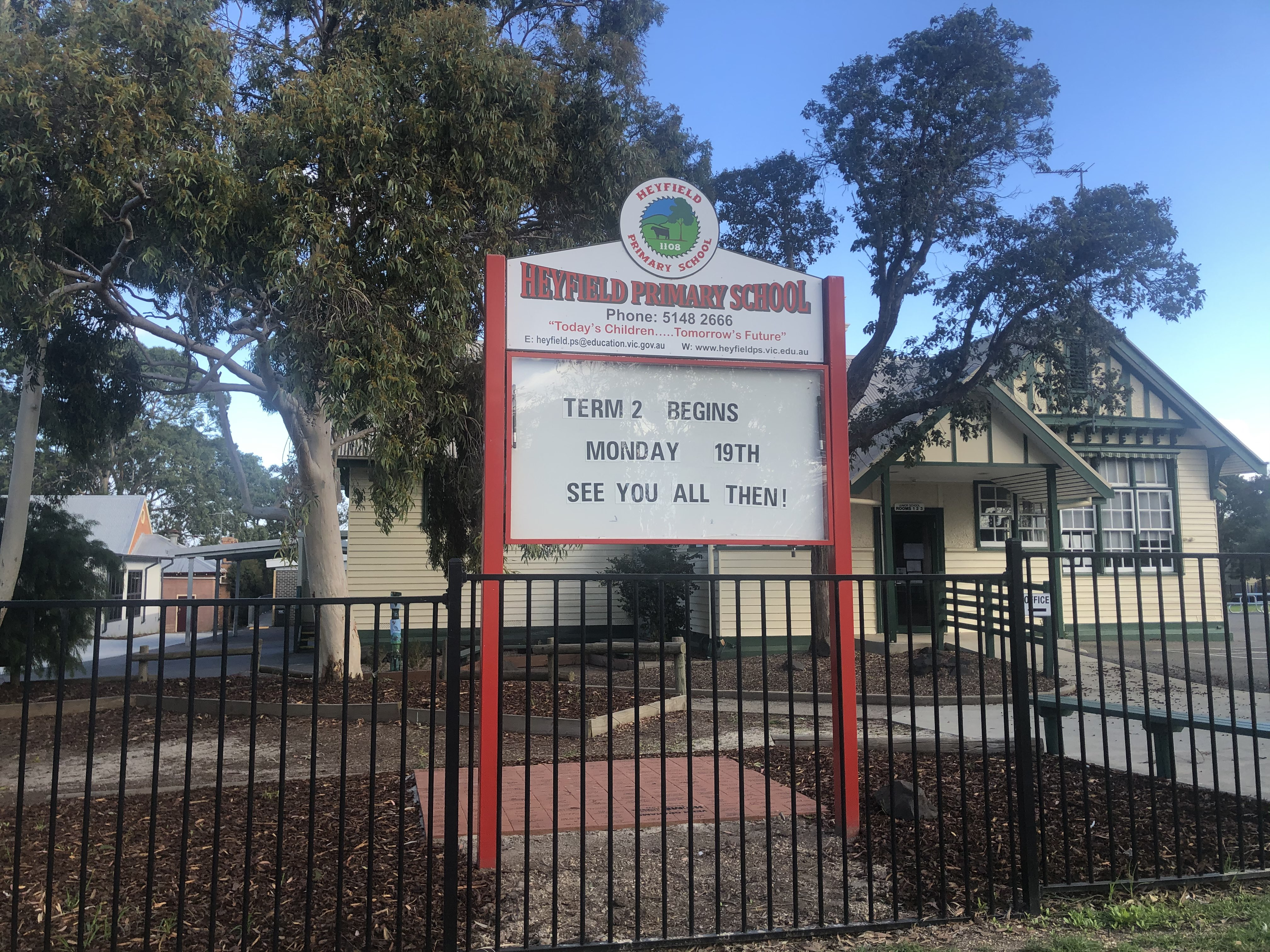
Primary school

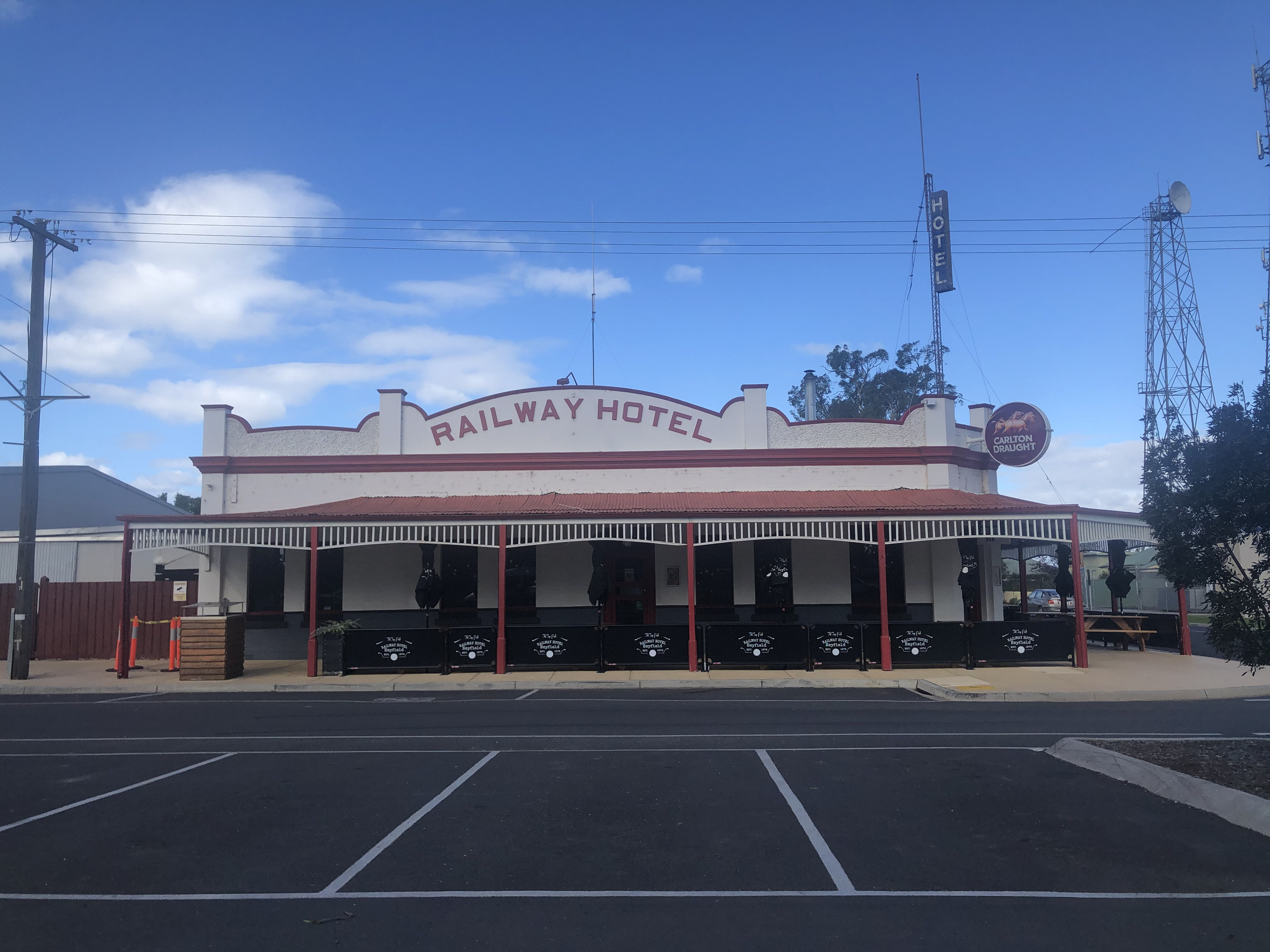
Railway Hotel

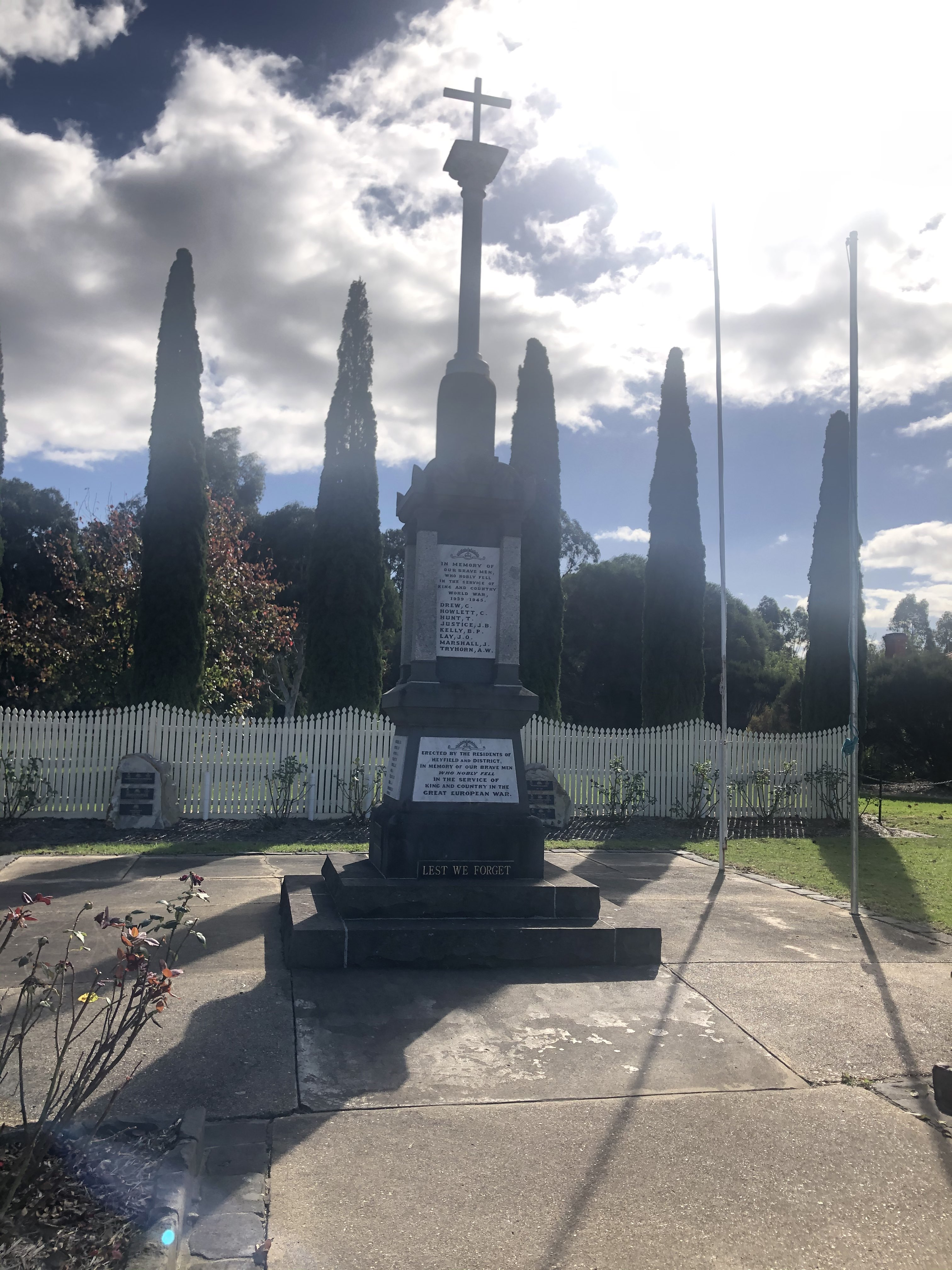
War memorial

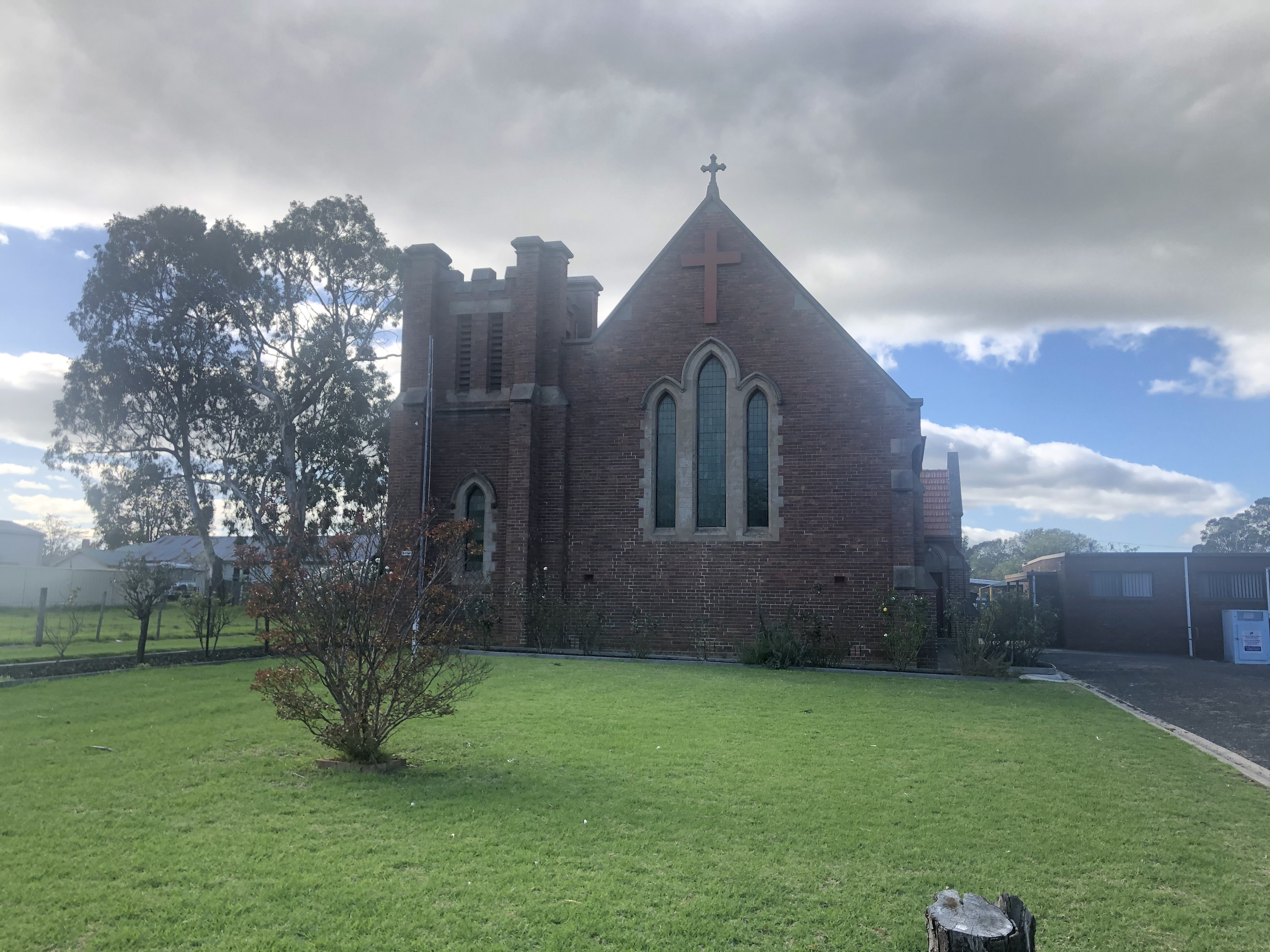
Saint James Anglican Church
