= Hazelwood =

Hazelwood or Hazlewood may refer to:

== Places ==
=== Australia ===
- Hazelwood, Victoria, an area in the Latrobe Valley, Victoria; now known as Churchill
- Hazelwood Power Station, in the Latrobe Valley, Victoria
- Hazelwood North, a town in the Latrobe Valley, Victoria
- Hazelwood, Victoria, also known as Hazelwood Pondage, an artificial lake in the Latrobe Valley, Victoria
- Hazelwood Park, South Australia, a suburb of Adelaide
  - Hazelwood Park, Adelaide

=== Canada ===
- Rural Municipality of Hazelwood No. 94, Saskatchewan, a rural municipality
- Hazelwood, Abbotsford, a neighbourhood in Abbotsford BC

=== England ===
- Hazelwood, Derbyshire (also spelt Hazlewood)
- Hazelwood, Devon, the location of the Blackdown Rings earthworks
- Hazelwood, London, in the London Borough of Bromley
- Hazlewood, North Yorkshire
  - Hazlewood Castle, North Yorkshire
  - Hazlewood with Storiths, North Yorkshire
- Hazlewood, Suffolk

=== Ireland ===
- Hazelwood, County Sligo
  - Hazelwood House, Sligo, an 18th-century mansion

=== South Africa ===
- Hazelwood, Pretoria, a suburb of Pretoria, Gauteng Province

=== United States ===
- Hazelwood, Indiana
- Hazelwood, Louisville, Kentucky
- Hazelwood Plantation, Laurel Hill, listed on the NRHP in Louisiana
- Hazelwood (Upper Marlboro, Maryland), listed on the NRHP in Maryland
- Hazelwood, Missouri
  - Hazelwood School District
    - Hazelwood School District v. United States, 1977 Supreme Court case
    - Hazelwood School District v. Kuhlmeier, 1988 Supreme Court case
- Hazelwood, North Carolina
- Hazelwood (Pittsburgh), Pennsylvania
- Hazelwood, Portland, Oregon
- Hazelwood (Port Royal, Virginia), listed on the NRHP in Virginia
- Hazelwood (Green Bay, Wisconsin), listed on the NRHP in Wisconsin

== People with the surname ==
- Ali Hazelwood, Italian neuroscientist and writer
- Charles Hazlewood (born 1966), British conductor
- Donald Hazlewood (1930–2025), Australian violinist and choir master
- Elizabeth Haselwood (c. 1644–1715) English silversmith
- John Hasilwood (died 1544), English politician
- John Hazelwood (1726–1800), American naval officer
- John A. Hazelwood (1869–1923), American politician
- Joseph Hazelwood (1946–2022), American sailor, captain of the Exxon Valdez during its 1989 oil spill
- Josh Hazlewood (born 1991), Australian cricketer
- Lee Hazlewood (1929–2007), American singer
- Mike Hazlewood (1941–2001), English singer, songwriter, composer
- Mike Hazelwood (born 1958), English water skier
- Patsy Hazlewood (born 1949), American politician
- Rex Hazlewood (1903–1985), British Scouting Official
- Rex Hazlewood, Australian architect
- Rex Hazlewood (photographer), Australian photographer
- Roy Hazelwood (1938–2016), FBI profiler
- Will Hazlewood (born 1971), British Anglican bishop

== Other uses ==
- Hazelwood (rugby ground), a sports venue in Sunbury-on-Thames, England
- Hazelwood School, Limpsfield, Surrey, England
- Hazelwood School, Birmingham, England
- USS Hazelwood (DD-531)
- USS Hazelwood (DD-107)
- Hazel wood, from the hazel tree
- "The Hazelwood", a song by Patrick Wolf; see Tristan (song)
- Hazlewoods Limited, British bicycle manufacturer
- Hazelwood massacre, 1971 Detroit mass murder
