= Hazelwood House =

Hazelwood House may refer to:

- Hazelwood House, Glasgow, Scotland
- Hazelwood House, Sligo, Palladian style country house 2 miles south-east of Sligo town, Ireland
- Hunton Park country house and estate in Abbots Langley, Hertfordshire, England, formerly known as Hazelwood House

== See also ==
- Hazelwood (disambiguation)
