= Yinnar =

Town in Victoria, Australia

- Town
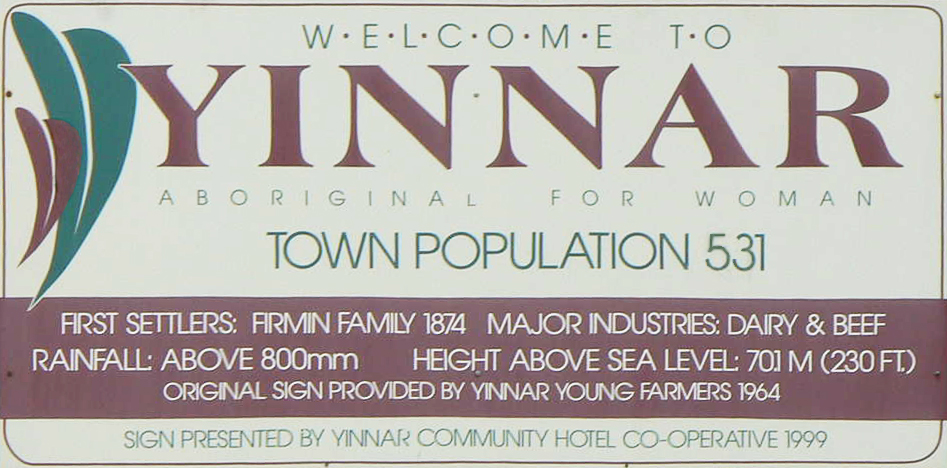

- Coordinates: 38°19′S 146°19′E
- Country: Australia
- State: Victoria
- LGA: City of Latrobe
- Location: 159 km (99 mi) E of Melbourne; 22 km (14 mi) S of Morwell; 10 km (6.2 mi) W of Churchill

Government
  - State electorate: Morwell
  - Federal division: Gippsland

Population
  - Total: 907 (2016 census)
- Postcode: 3869
- County: Buln Buln
Localities around Yinnar
Hazelwood	Morwell	Churchill
Thorpdale	Yinnar	Jeeralang Junction
Mirboo North	Boolarra	Yinnar South

Yinnar is a rural Australian township located in the Latrobe Valley in central Gippsland, Victoria, Australia. At the 2016 census, Yinnar had a population of 907. The origin of the name "Yinnar" is believed to have been derived from the local Aboriginal term yinnar, meaning "woman".

== History ==
Yinnar began as a part of the Scrubby Forest Station at Middle Creek, which as its name implies, was heavily wooded. Its southern section was mountainous, so its area of practical use was estimated as ten square miles. The first holders were Nicol Brown and Billy Hillier. Eventually they divided the station into two with Middle Creek being the line of division, Brown taking the western half and Hillier the eastern half. Billy's Creek was named after Billy Hillier. They held their leases from 1848 to 1868.

George Firmin arrived at Middle Creek in 1874 and took over Scrubby Forest West, which he divided into what was known as the Scrubby Forest Run. Due to this the Firmin family are said to be the first settlers of Yinnar. Other early selectors on Scrubby Forest Run were Henry Wicks and John Quigley. In 1885 George Firmin handed the license back to the Government so the farming areas were made available to selectors. The town was surveyed in May 1885 and two months later one hundred allotments were auctioned to selectors at the offices of Mr Wicks' agents.

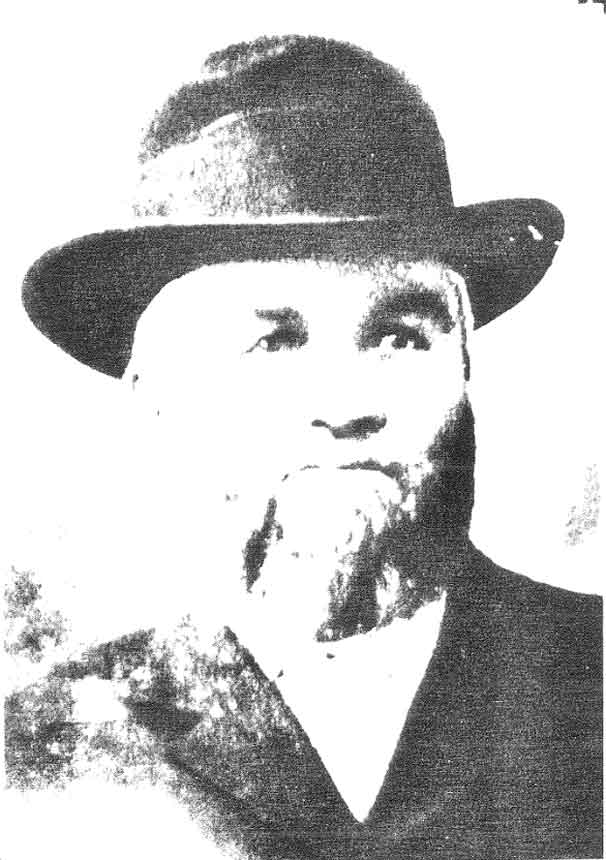
John Quigley

The area called Middle Creek and Scrubby Forest became known as Yinnar in 1879. George Firmin's wife Maria and their eleven children came to live with him in the bark hut at the Scrubby Forest Run in 1898. They were the first family to live in Yinnar.

Many of the first buildings in Yinnar were established in the 1880s by Mr. John Quigley and Mr. Henry Wicks, two of the early settlers in Yinnar. The buildings by Mr Quigley included Quigley's house, a store, a butcher's shop, a boarding house and a wine saloon. Mr Wicks was the builder of the first hotel.

Despite many fires over the years some of the earlier buildings of Yinnar are still around today.

On 2 December 1927 the State Electricity Commission of Victoria announced that a supply of electricity had been made available to the town of Yinnar.

== Traditional ownership ==
The formally recognised traditional owners for the area in which Yinnar sits are the Gunaikurnai people. The Gunaikurnai people are represented by the Gunaikurnai Land and Water Aboriginal Corporation.

== Arts ==
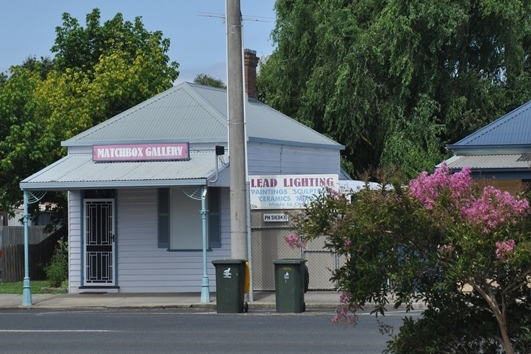
Matchbox Gallery

Yinnar's arts community includes two art galleries in its main street.

=== Arc Yinnar ===
Arc Yinnar is an art resource collective which includes a gallery featuring local and national artists. It also includes studio spaces for use by local artists. It also has an art and craft gift shop featuring the work of Gippsland artists.

=== Matchbox Gallery ===
In a restored building over 100 years old is the Matchbox Gallery. The gallery features local artists and has been converted to include bed and breakfast accommodation.

== Scenery ==
=== Centenary Gardens ===
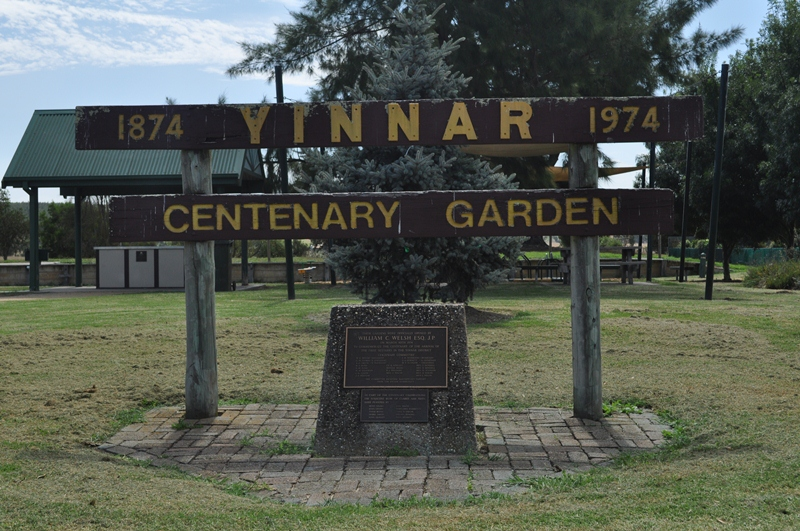
Centenary Gardens

The Centenary Gardens located in Main Street were officially opened by William C. Welsh on 10 March 1974 to commemorate the centenary of the arrival of the first settlers in the Yinnar district. The gardens include the railway goods shed, play equipment, picnic tables, barbecue area, tourist information and public toilets.

=== CWA Park ===
The CWA Park located in Main Street was named to commemorate the Country Women's Association golden jubilee.

=== Charles Bond Park ===
Charles Bond Park is located in Wicks Street and contains a grassed area and children's playground equipment.

=== Morwell National Park ===
Located about 15 minutes from the centre of the town is the Morwell National Park in Yinnar South. The walking tracks in the National Park have been improved by local volunteers and the Latrobe City Council.

=== Hazelwood Pondage ===
Located about five minutes from the centre of town is Hazelwood Pondage. An artificial lake with water the pondage is no longer heated since the power station closing down. The lake allows public access for sailing, boating and other recreational water sports. The lake also has a caravan park on its shores which is a popular holiday spot during the warmer months.

=== Strzelecki Trail ===
Yinnar is a popular tourist stop on the Strzelecki Trail also known as tourism 'Route 94 '. 'Route 94' marks the scenic drive through central Gippsland from the Latrobe Valley into the Strzelecki Ranges through villages such as Yinnar, Boolarra and Mirboo North, farmland, lakes, forests and national parks such as Tarra Bulga National Park and Morwell National Park.

== General stores ==
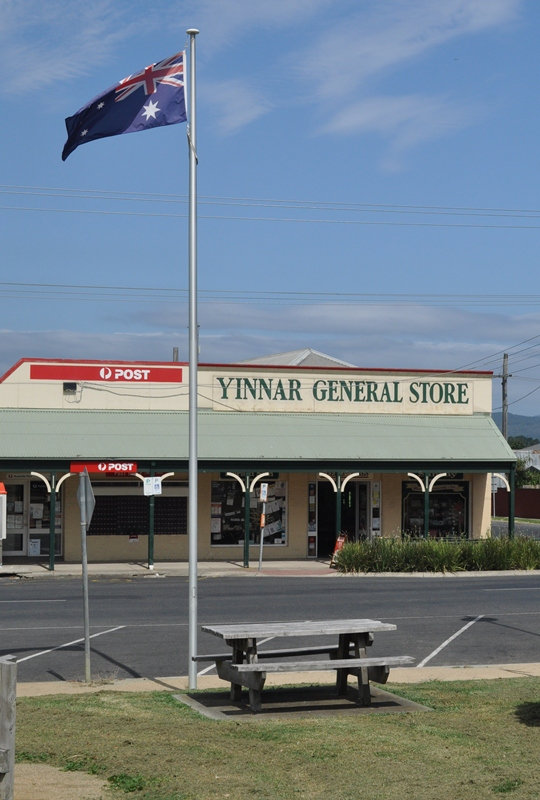
Yinnar General Store and Post Office

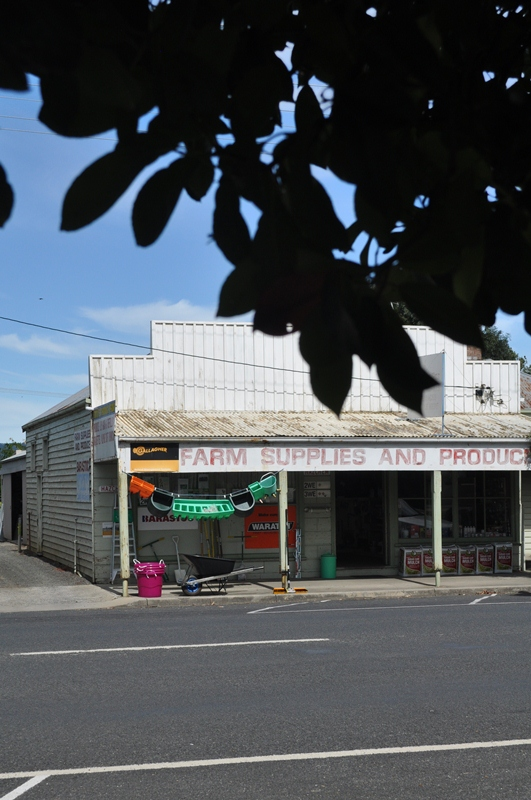
Jack Scott & Sons

The first store to be built in Yinnar was conducted as a general store and drapery. It was built in the northern end of town and first owned by Mr John Quigley during the 1880s. Early on the store's sign read as "W.T. Sheffield, General Store Keeper and Draper" however it was also known informally as Quigley's Store. The general store was later run by Mr John More and also operated as a newsagency, during this time the store's sign read as "John More's General Store". The store was later destroyed by fire on 26 March 1912. The fire broke out at 9:00pm in the rear of the store and quickly spread to Robinson's Bakery and Mr Robinson's dwelling which was next door. More's stock was insured in the Commercial Union Company for £1,000. The building, which was owned by the trustees of the estate of the late Mr T Walsh, was insured for £300.

The current Yinnar General Store building is one of only three brick buildings originally built in the town. The others being the Cream and Butter Factory and the Butchers Shop. The building was established in December 1912 by Mr John Hall and was named the Universal Emporium. Mr John Hall had previously conducted D. C. Mills and Co. Pty. Ltd in Morwell which he purchased in 1894. An avenue of trees in Hazelwood Road, Morwell were planted as a monument to his memory.

Universal Emporium was taken over by the Vinning Family c. 1919 and was renamed the Vinning Bros. General Store, also known as Federal Emporium. In September 1959, Geoff and Joan Mosley purchased the General Store with Ian and Winifred Jones, who later went on to open the Churchill Newsagency. The store was renamed the Yinnar General Store in 1959. The Yinnar General Store was purchased in late 1976 by Herb and Janette Smith who ran the store until c. 1984 when it was purchased by Wayne and Marg Bassee. In c. 1986 the store was leased to the Cleary family. The store was later purchased in c. 1987 by the Linton family. In the late 1980s the front facade of the building was modernised to incorporate the neighboring post office building. In November 2010 the Yinnar General Store business was purchased by the Dennis family. The building has remained as a general store for around one hundred years. It includes a newsagency and other services for the community.

=== Post office ===
Yinnar Post Office opened on 1 May 1884.

== Food and produce ==
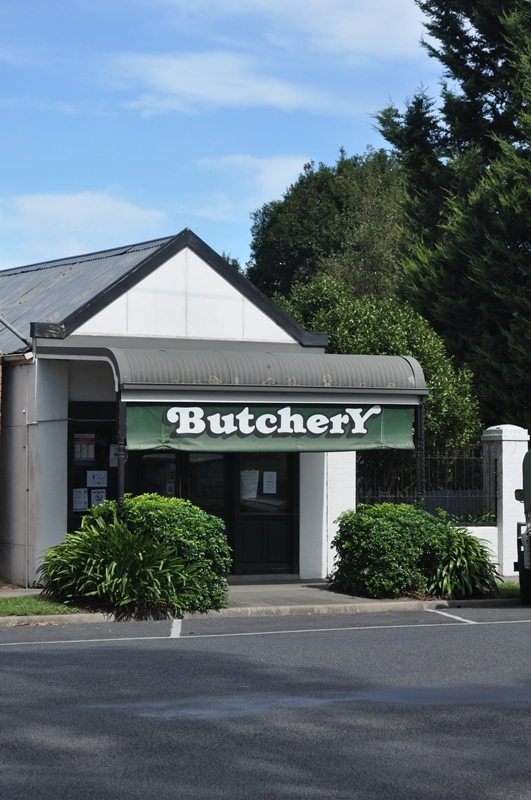
Yinnar Butchery

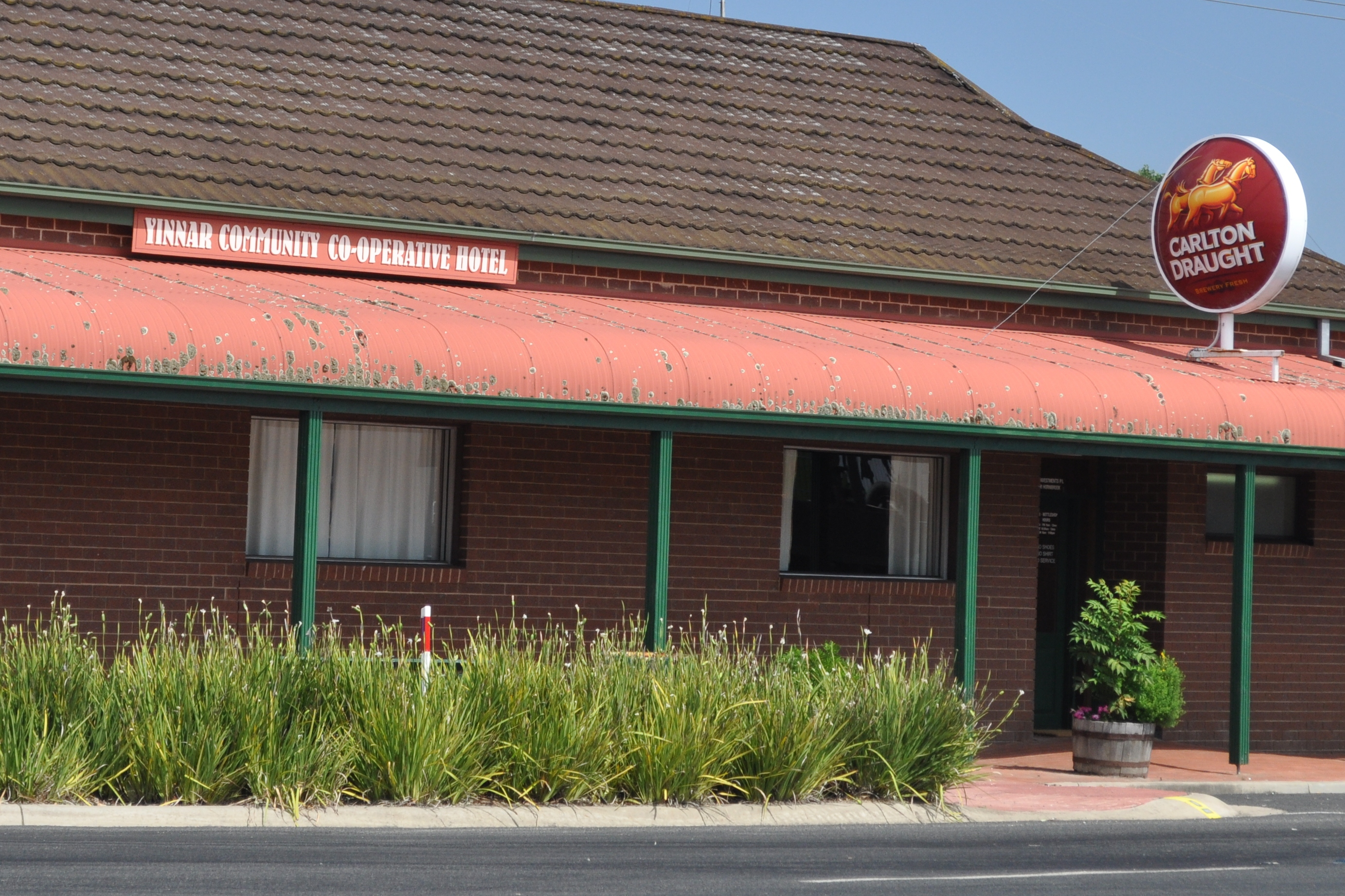
Yinnar Community Hotel

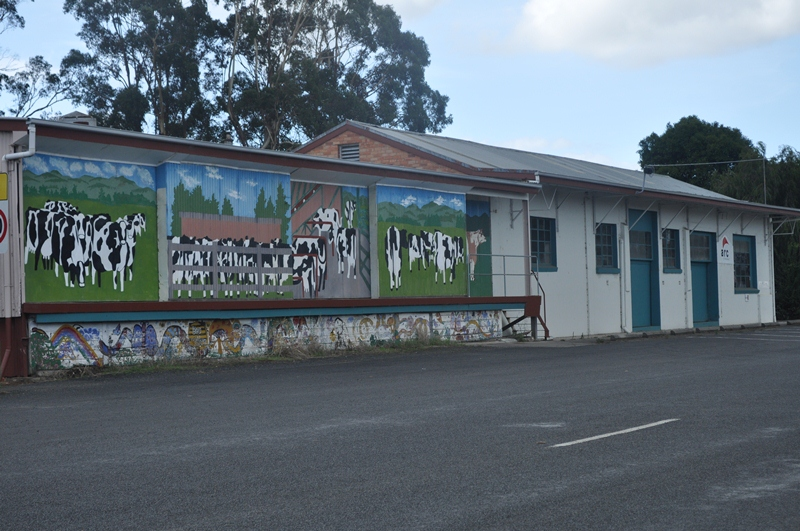
Butter factory, main street

=== Bakery ===
The first bakery in Yinnar was built between 1880 and 1900. It was run by Mr Robinson and was known as Robinson's Bakery. It was later destroyed by fire on 26 March 1912. The fire broke out at 9:00pm in the rear of John More's General Store which was next door and quickly spread to the bakery and Mr Robinson's house. The bakery and house, owned by Mr T Bolger, were insured in the New Zealand National Company for £200, and the stock was covered by a policy of £150 in the Patriotic Company. A new bakery was then built. It was run by Mr. Geo. Preston and was known as Yinnar Bakery during the 1930s.

=== Butchery ===
The first butchers shop in Yinnar was built in the 1880s by Mr John Quigley and was operated by Mr Arthur Williams from 1892 to 1911. At other times the premises were also used as a sweet shop, bank, dentist and barber. The current butchers shop in Yinnar is known as Webster's Butchery and is located at 64 main street.

=== Hotel ===
The first hotel in Yinnar was built in c. 1885 by Mr. Henry Wicks. It was an establishment of twelve rooms, five stalls and accommodation. The first licensee was William M Jensens. The building was destroyed by fire in 1914 and a new hotel was built in 1916. During the flu epidemic the hotel was temporarily closed and used as a hospital.

On 1 September 1972 the Yinnar Community Hotel Co-operative Limited was registered and the hotel became known as the Yinnar Community Hotel. The Yinnar Community Hotel was one of the first co-operative community owned hotels in Australia. It currently serves as a hotel, pub, bar and bistro. It hosts local bluegrass and old-time string band The Strzelecki Stringbusters on the final Wednesday of the month.

=== Wine saloon ===
The first wine saloon in Yinnar was built by Mr John Quigley in the 1880s. It was run as a wine cafe and billiard saloon by Mr R Taylor and was known as the Railway Coffee Palace. The building was later destroyed by fire in the early morning of 26 September 1910. The owner at the time, Mrs Quigley, had insured the building for over £700 in the Commercial Union office. Mr Taylor's stock was insured for £960 in the New Zealand Fire Insurance Company.

=== Creamery & butter factory ===
A co-operative butter factory opened in Creamery Road, Yinnar in 1891. The factory was sold in 1901 to Wood & Co. who modernised and upgraded the machinery. In 1915 the factory was purchased by Hussey. The factory was later demolished.

A new butter factory was established in 1929 and was located at main street, Yinnar. This factory was later operated by Nestlé from 1940 and Murray Goulburn. Since 1982 the factory has been used by an art resource collective 'Arc Yinnar'.

== Landmarks ==
=== Anglican church ===
The first church was established in 1888 on land donated by Mr. George Firmin, and this was the United Church (Anglican, Presbyterian & Methodist) which is now known as St Matthews.

=== Methodist church ===
Yinnar Methodist Church was established 6 October 1934.

=== Catholic church ===
The Yinnar Catholic Church Our Lady of Good Counsel was established 26 April 1903 on land donated by Mr John Quigley.

=== Church of England ===
The Church of England in Yinnar South known as Holy Innocents was established in 1894.

=== Mechanics' Institute ===
The Mechanics' Institute was built in 1888. It served as a community centre for the district until its ultimate destruction by fire in 1963.

=== Memorial Hall ===
The Yinnar and District Memorial Hall is located in the main street.

=== War memorial ===
The Yinnar war memorial, located in main street, was unveiled on 1 December 1920.

=== Bell tower ===
In 1921, with first settlers George and Maria Firmin deceased, the Firmin family chose a church bell as a memorial to them. The bell was cast in Melbourne, and a suitable inscription added. The bell was erected in a tower at the back of the church and stood until the church was closed and the building and tower removed in the 1990s. In 2006, the Co-Operating Church Parish Council decided to take steps to have St Matthew's bell installed at the Church in Main St. Yinnar. The Yinnar and District Community Association was contacted. They suggested a survey of the town's people. This survey was well patronized. As the bell was the property of the Anglican Church the church then contacted the Anglican Bishop of Gippsland, the Right Rev John McIntyre. Bishop John offered the bell to the Yinnar Community to be erected on public land as an historical monument to help the town recognize and remember the pioneering family of George and Maria Firmin. Four years of planning followed, with liaison with Latrobe City Council, Yinnar and District Association, Pro Draft P.L. (construction), grant funding, etc. The memorial bell tower was established on 8 August 2010.

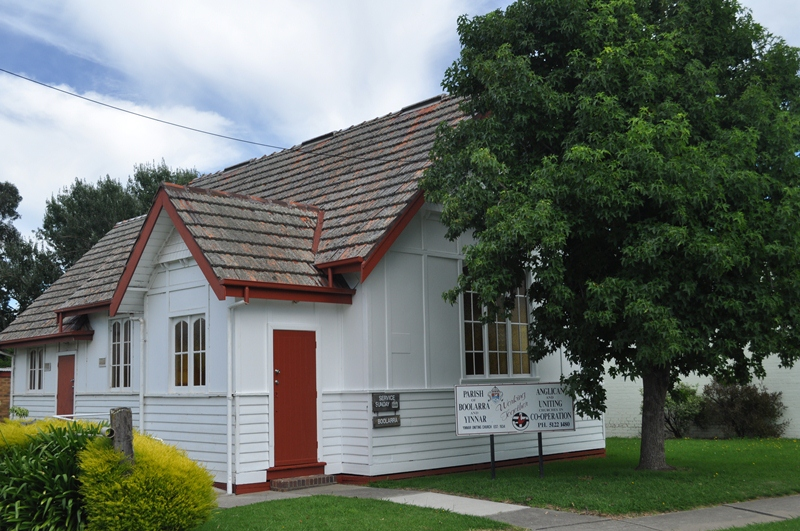
Anglican Church

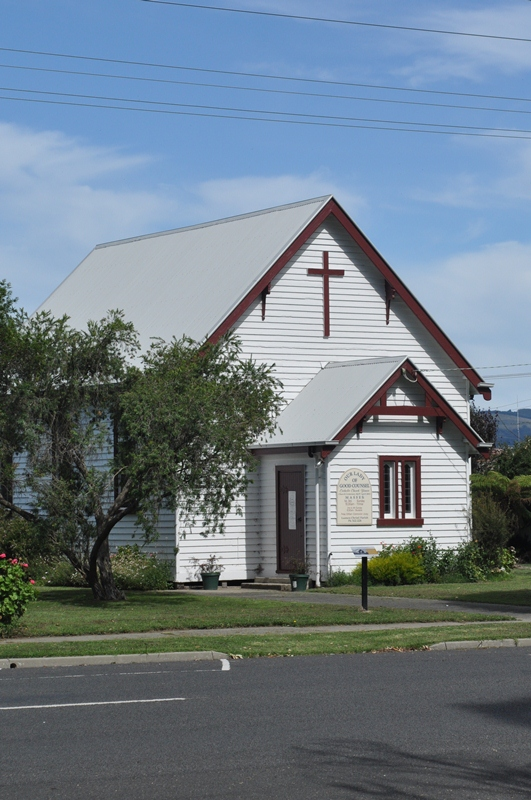
Catholic Church

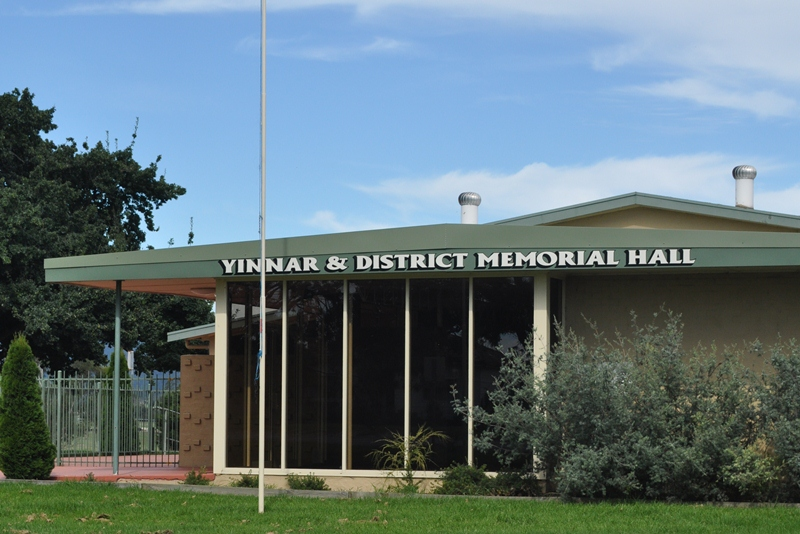
Memorial Hall

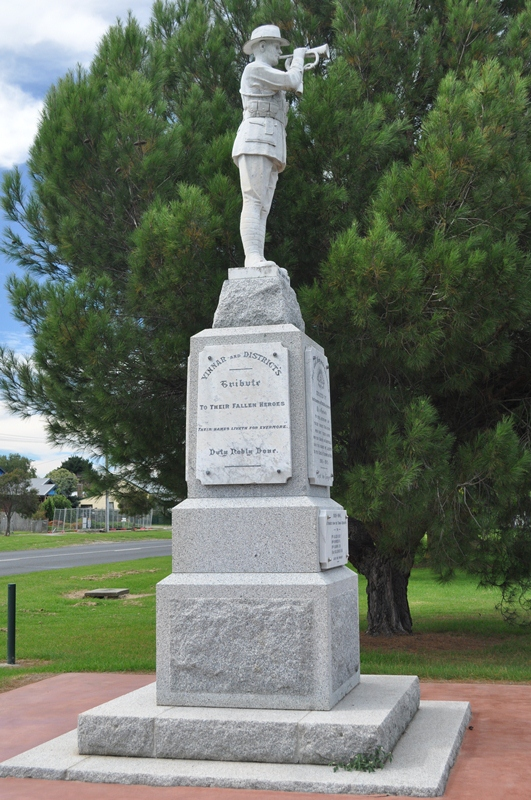
War Memorial

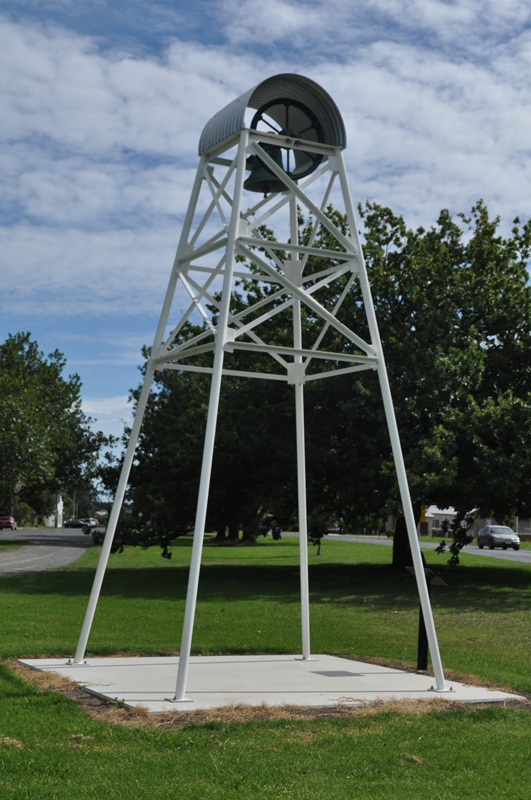
Bell Tower

== Education ==
The only school in Yinnar, No. 2419, was established on 22 August 1881. It currently serves as a primary school, Yinnar Primary School, with less than two hundred students currently enrolled. Classes run from grades prep to six for children from five to twelve years of age.

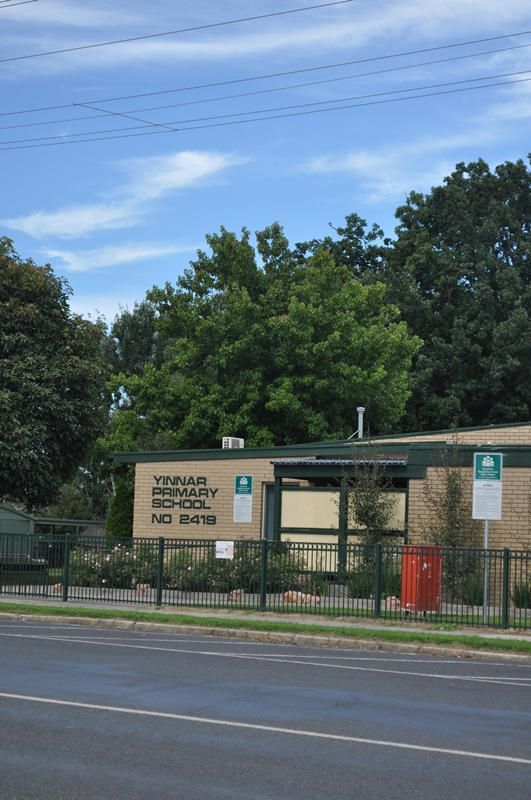
Yinnar Primary School

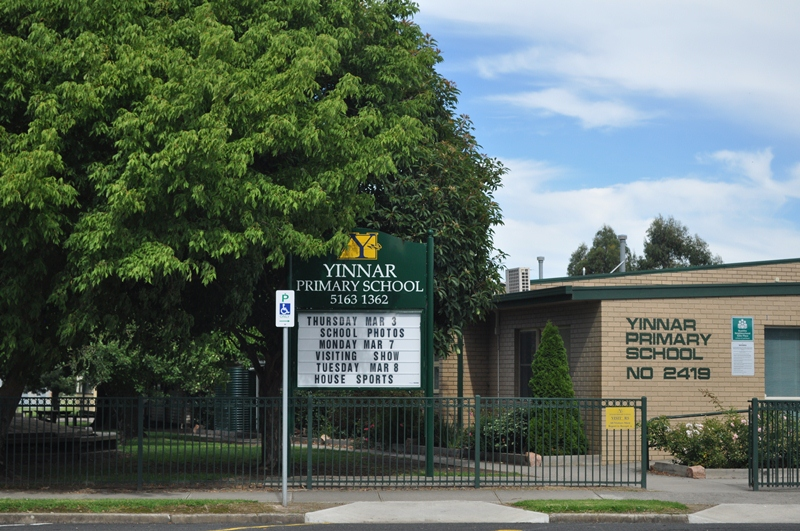
Yinnar Primary School

Yinnar also has a playgroup, 'Possums of Yinnar Playgroup' which is held once a week at the Yinnar Memorial Hall located in the Main Street.

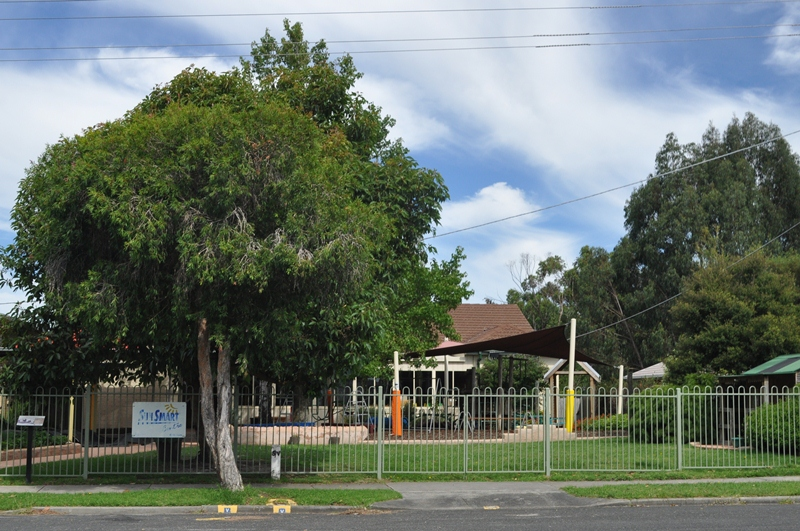
Yinnar Preschool (Kindergarten)

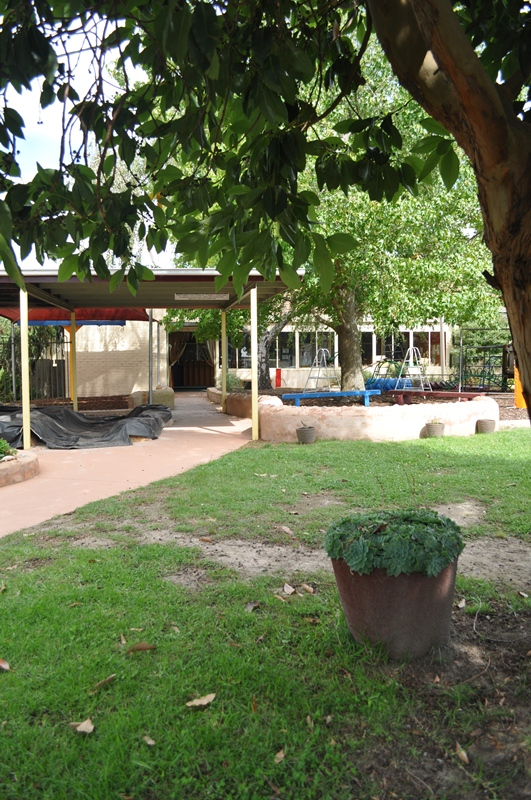
Yinnar Preschool (Kindergarten)

== Transport ==
=== Railway ===
The township of Yinnar came into existence after the opening of the Mirboo North railway line, which branched from the main Gippsland line at Morwell. The branch opened in sections during 1885 and 1886, and the Yinnar station was established in 1885 at the 'seven mile peg', becoming the nucleus for a township.

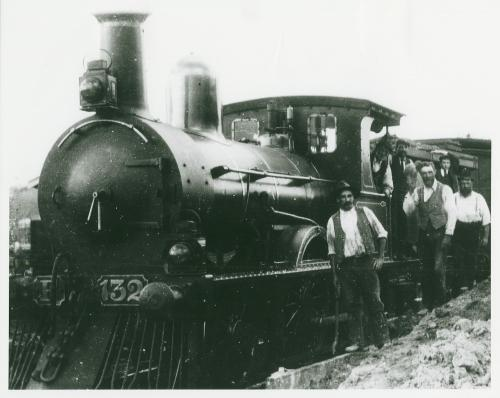
A relief train at Yinnar station during the 1903 railway strike

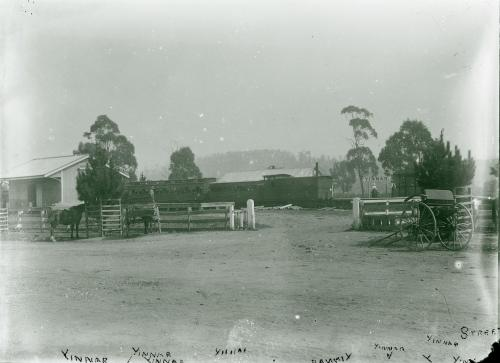
Yinnar railway station c. 1930

The Yinnar Railway Goods Shed was built in 1887 at the railway station in Main Street, which is now the site of Yinnar Bicentennial Park. The building is occupied by the Yinnar Historical Society.

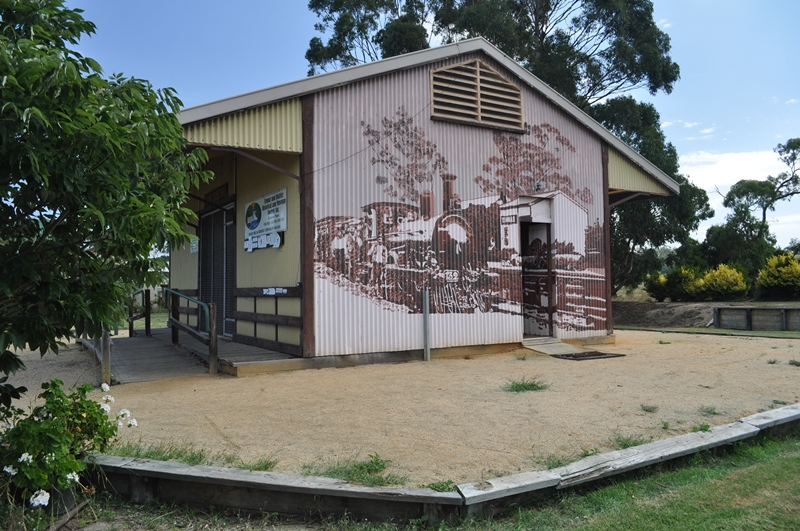
Railway Goods Shed

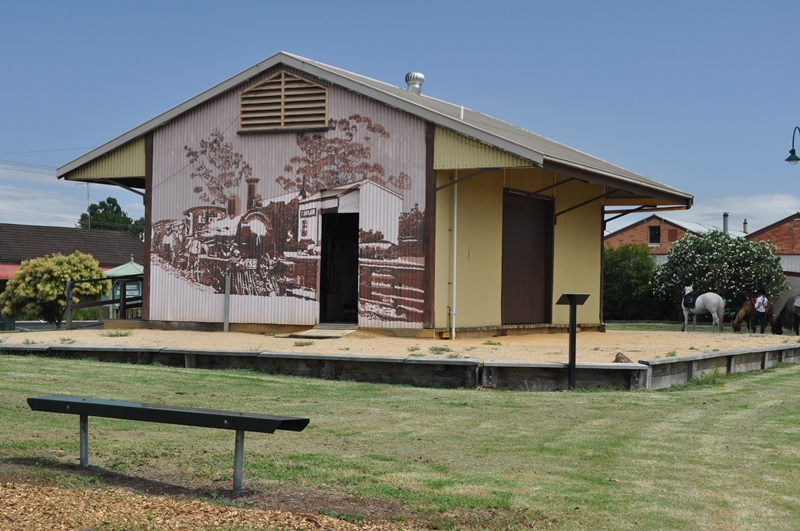
Railway Goods Shed

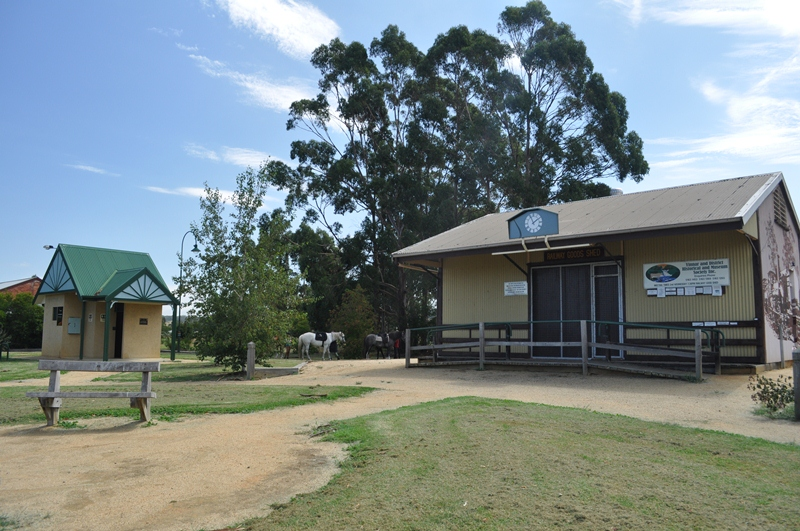
Railway Goods Shed

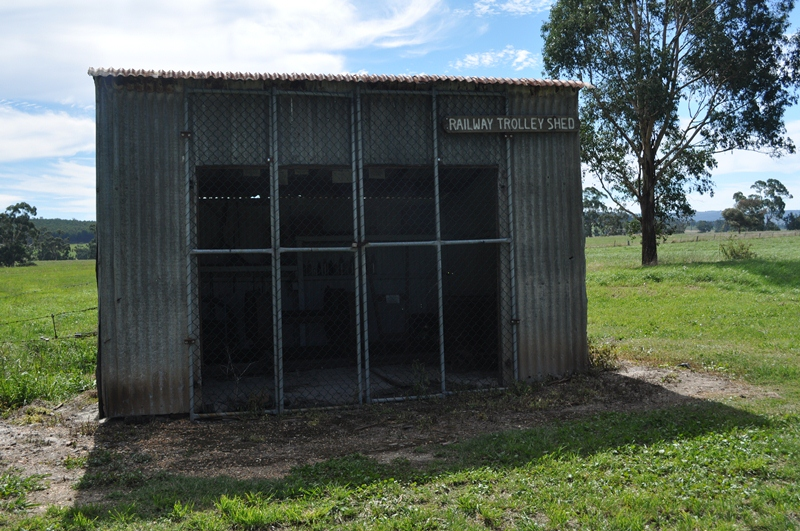
Railway ganger's trolley shed

The Better Farming Train toured East Gippsland in late 1927, and visited Yinnar 13 October 1927.

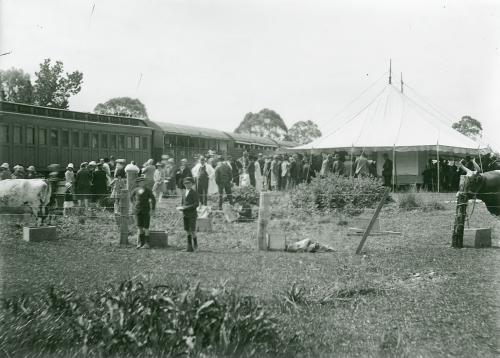
Better Farming Train, Yinnar

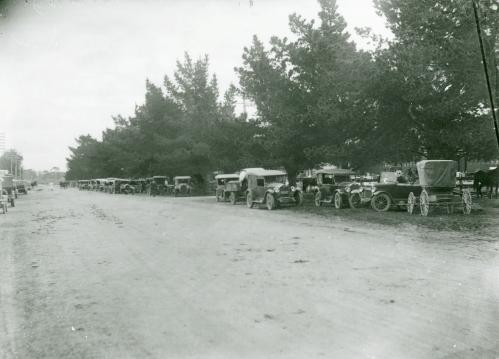
Better Farming Train - road vehicles in Main Street, Yinnar

== Agriculture ==
In 1921 the first herd testing association in Gippsland was formed at Yinnar.

== Clubs ==
The town has had a variety of sporting and recreation groups over time including a football and netball club, cricket club, bowls club and scouts group.

=== Football club ===
The Yinnar Football and Netball Club is home to an Australian rules football team named the Yinnar Magpies competing in the Mid Gippsland Football League. The Yinnar Magpies were the Mid Gippsland premiers in 1939, 1954, 1964, 1967, 1969, 1970, 1971, 1973, 1998, 2001, 2004 and 2008 where in 2008, . The Yinnar Football Club was established in 1884. The Yinnar Football and Netball Club makes use of the Yinnar Recreation Reserve in Jumbuk road, Yinnar.

=== Cricket club ===
The local cricket club is named the Morwell Tigers / Yinnar Raiders Cricket Club and is part of the Latrobe Valley & District Cricket League. In the 2019/20 season they celebrated their first A grade Premiership in 14 years by finishing top of the ladder winning it by default as finals did not take place due to the coronavirus outbreak. The first cricket club in Yinnar was established in the early 1930s.

=== Judo club ===
The Yinnar & District Judo Club, trains at the Yinnar Recreation Reserve Wednesday Nights 6pm - 7.30pm (School terms), and you can find updated information and club contact details at www.Facebook.com/yinnarjudoclub

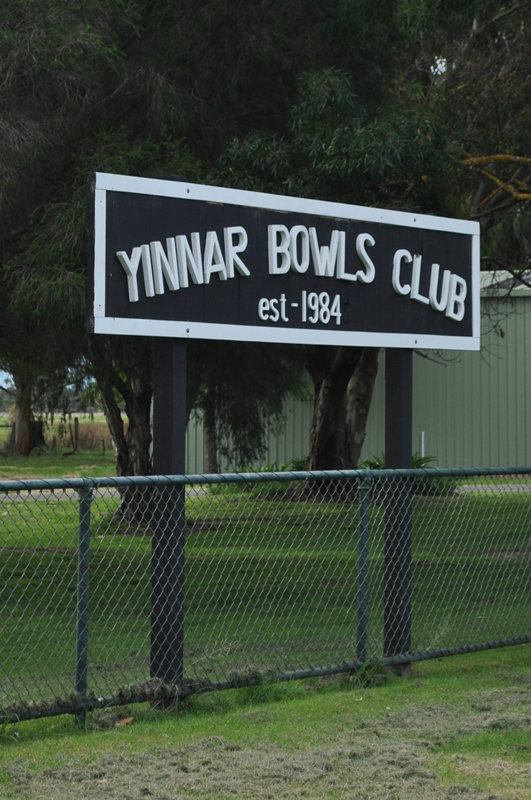
Bowls Club

=== Bowls club ===
The Yinnar Bowling Club was formed 22 February 1954 and is located in main street, Yinnar.

=== Tennis club ===
The Yinnar Tennis Club was formed c. 1917.

=== Lions club ===
The Yinnar and District Lions Club was charted by the Churchill Lions Club in 1985.

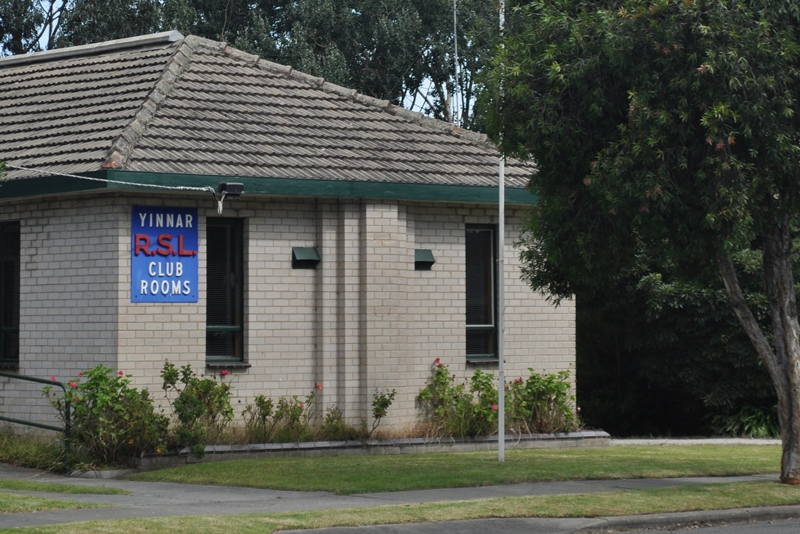
Yinnar RSL

=== Yinnar RSL ===
The Yinnar RSL club rooms are located in the main street.

=== Scouts group ===
The First Yinnar Scout Group meets at the scout hall in main street, Yinnar.

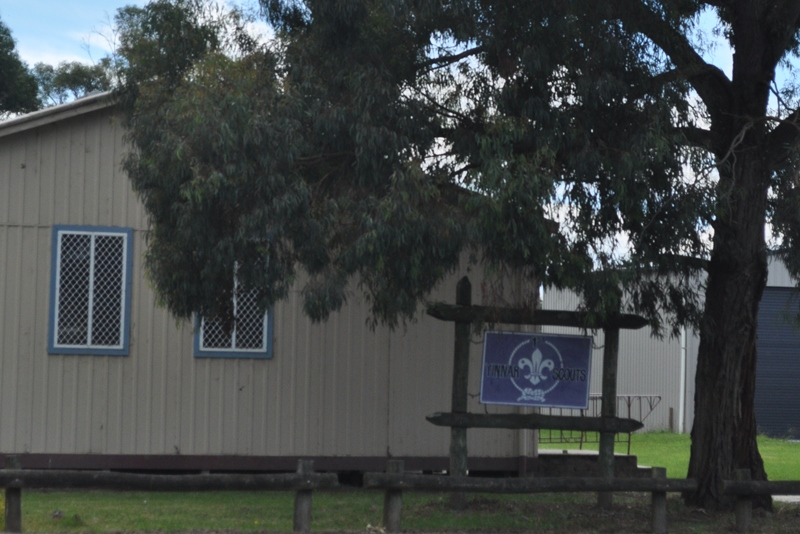
Scout Hall

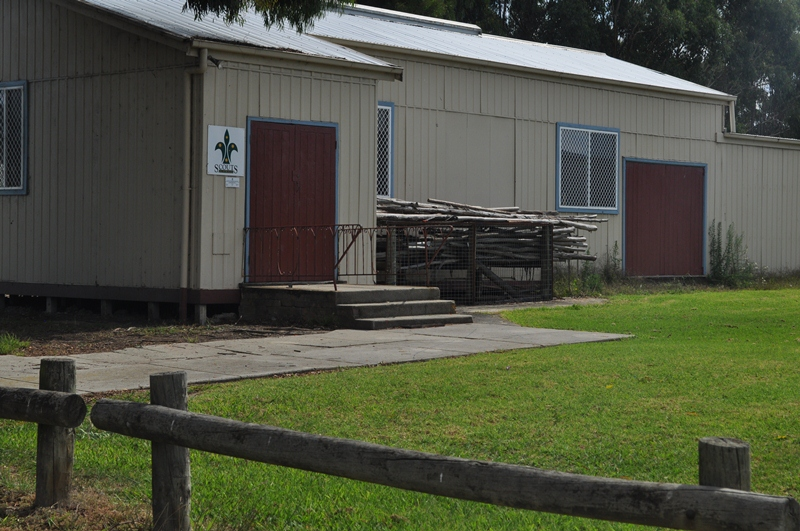
Scout Hall

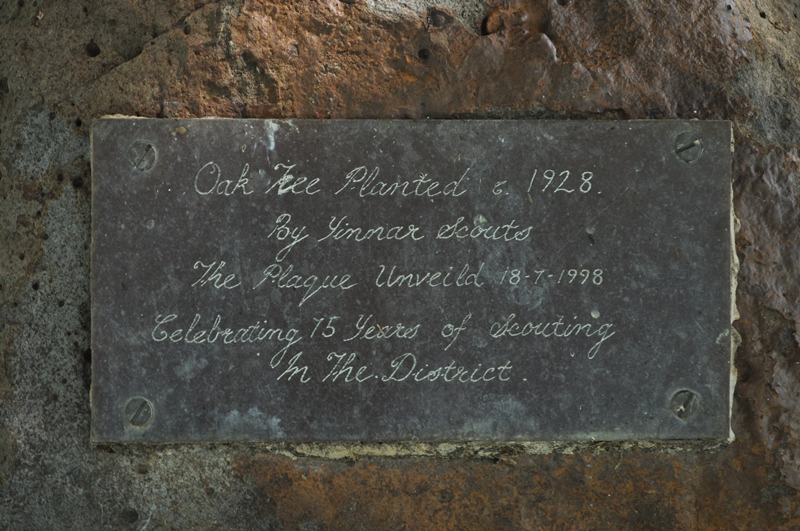
Scouts Plaque

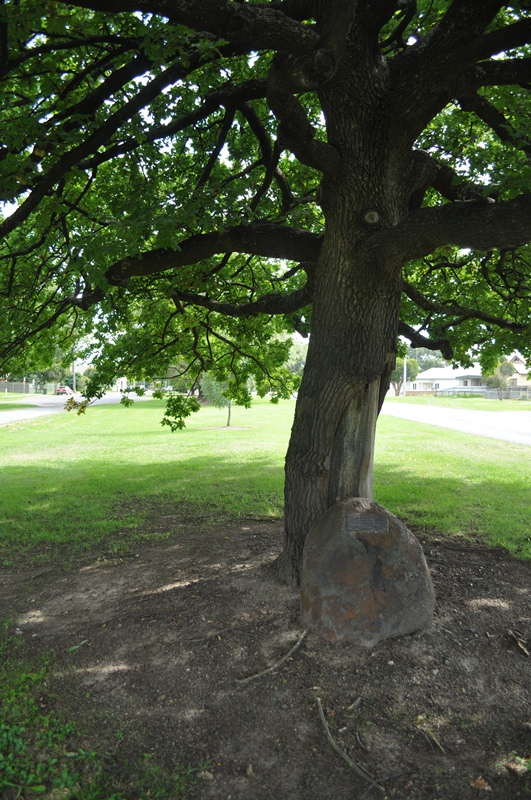
Scouts Oak Tree

=== Angling club ===
There are two fishing clubs nearby, Yinnar Angling Club and Latrobe Valley Fly Fishers. The Yinnar Angling Club was first formed prior to 1918 and was re-formed in 1946.

=== Racing club ===
The Yinnar Racing Club was formed in 1886. The first race meeting was held in 1887, at what was commonly called the Yinnar racecourse at Lavinia Park, which since became part of a farm.

=== Golf club ===
In the past Yinnar had a golf club with a nine-hole course traversing the original recreation reserve and a sizeable amount of the Firmin property.

=== Athletic club ===
In the past Yinnar had an athletic club which was formed between 1933 and 1944.

=== Basketball club ===
The Yinnar basketball club was formed in the 1930s.

=== Badminton club ===
The first meeting of the Yinnar Badminton Club was held on 21 February 1956.

=== Rifle club ===
The Yinnar Rifle Club was formed in August 1913.
