= Boolarra railway station =

Former railway station in Victoria, Australia

Coordinates: 38°22′44″S 146°16′23″E

Boolarra

General information
- Line: Mirboo North
- Platforms: 1
- Tracks: 2

Other information
- Status: Closed

History
- Opened: 1885
- Closed: 1974

Services
Preceding station	Disused railways	Following station
Yinnar	Mirboo North line	Darlimurla
List of closed railway stations in Victoria
Location

Boolarra is a closed station located in the town of Boolarra, on the Mirboo North railway line railway line in Victoria, Australia. A rail trail now follows where it used to be.

Historically, bauxite was stockpiled at the station site, and once per year it was transported to Brooklyn, Victoria. The 1972 transfer, for example, ran over 11 days between 8 and 20 December. During this period there were two daily trains, the first starting from Traralgon railway station as a light locomotive (Note: T391 on 9 December 1972), collecting at Boolarra, reversing at Morwell railway station and depositing the loaded wagons at Warragul railway station, then making a second trip in the evening. The loaded wagons left Warragul on a regular goods train worked by an L class at 3 am, with engines changed at Flinders Street, terminating at Brooklyn at 6 am. Due to limited siding lengths the trains between Boolarra and Warragul were restricted to 12 wagons (356 LT (362 t)), and between Warragul and Brooklyn 23 wagons (695 LT (706 t)), both including the length and weight of the guard's van.
