= Mirboo North railway line =

Former railway line in Victoria, Australia

Mirboo North

Overview
- Status: Track dismantled along entire length, reservation excavated for coal operation between Morwell and Hazlewood, rail trail from Boolarra to Mirboo North.
- Stations: 5

Service
- Type: V/Line passenger service

History
- Commenced: 1883
- Opened: 10 April 1885 (Morwell to Boolarra), 8 September 1885 (Boolarra to Darlimurla), 7 January 1886 (Darlimurla to Mirboo North).
- Completed: 1886
- Closed: 24 June 1974 (Morwell to Mirboo North)

Technical
- Line length: 32.19 km (20 mi)
- Number of tracks: Single

The Mirboo North railway line was a country branch line in Victoria, Australia. It branched from the main Gippsland line at Morwell station, and opened in three stages from 1885 to 1886. The stations along the line were Hazelwood, Yinnar, Boolarra, Darlimurla and Mirboo North.

The line remained in continuous service until it was closed in 1974, although the passenger service ceased in 1968. The section between Boolarra and Mirboo North has been converted into the Grand Ridge Rail Trail. Part of the former right-of-way between Morwell Junction and Hazelwood has been consumed by the coal mine for the Hazelwood power station.

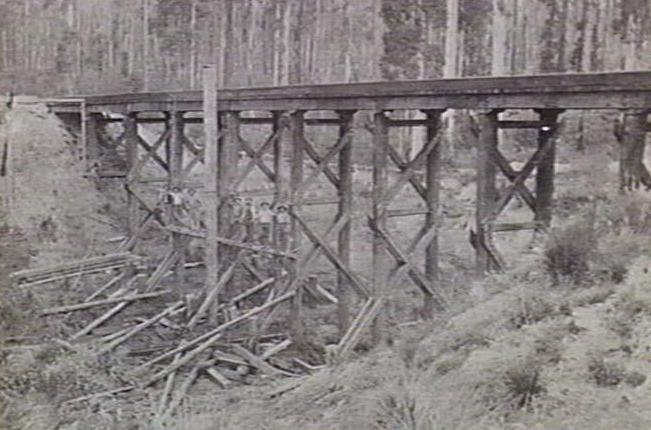
Trestle bridge between Boolarra and Darlimurla
