= Listed buildings in Hazlewood with Storiths =

Hazlewood with Storiths is a civil parish in the county of North Yorkshire, England. It contains nine listed buildings that are recorded in the National Heritage List for England. All the listed buildings are designated at Grade II, the lowest of the three grades, which is applied to "buildings of national importance and special interest". The parish contains the small settlements of Hazlewood and Storiths and the surrounding countryside, and the listed buildings consist of farmhouses, farm buildings, a house, a row of cottages and a bridge.

== Buildings ==
Name and location	Photograph	Date	Notes
Black Hill Farmhouse and barns 53.99139°N 1.82478°W		17th century	The buildings are in stone with stone slate roofs. The house has two storeys and three bays. The doorway on the right has a plain surround, the ground floor windows have flat-faced mullions, and in the upper floor they have double-chamfered mullions. To the left is a barn under the same roof as the house, and to the right is a lower barn.
Bolton Park Farmhouse; 53.99566°N 1.87948°W		17th century	The farmhouse is in rendered stone, with modillions above the ground floor, and a stone slate roof with shaped kneelers and moulded stone coping. There are two storeys and three bays, the middle bay projecting under a gable with a cross. The lower floor on each side also projects, and the windows have chamfered mullions and hood moulds. Inside the house is an inglenook fireplace.
Town End Farmhouse; 53.98697°N 1.87446°W	—	17th century	The farmhouse is in stone with quoins and a stone slate roof. There are two storeys and three bays. On the front are two doorways with chamfered surrounds, and the windows have single or double-chamfered mullions.
Adam Slack Cottage; 53.98534°N 1.87434°W		Mid 18th century	The house is in stone with quoins and a stone slate roof. There are two storeys and two bays. The doorway is to the left and the windows have flat-face mullions.
Stables and hay barn, Bolton Park Farm; 53.99551°N 1.87829°W	—	Mid to late 18th century	The building is in stone with a stone slate roof, and five bays. On the front are three stable doors, each with a casement window to the right. There are four giant round piers, and two to the right above the stables.
Stables and threshing barn, Bolton Park Farm; 53.99576°N 1.87839°W	—	Late 18th century	The building is in stone with a stone slate roof. There are two storeys, four bays, and a lower two-bay wing at right angles on the right. The openings include doors, casement windows, pigeon openings in the gable, and cross-shaped vents. To the right is an external staircase.
Pace Gate Bridge; 53.98876°N 1.82321°W		Late 18th to early 19th century	The bridge carries a road over Pace Gate Beck. It is in stone, and consists of a single segmental arch. The bridge has voussoirs, pilasters, a band and a parapet.
Hill End Farmhouse and barn 53.98218°N 1.85834°W	—	1809	The house and attached barn are in stone with a stone slate roof. The house has two storeys and two bays, and a recessed lower single-bay wing on the right. It has modillions, a doorway with a plain surround, above which is an initialled and dated stone panel, and sash windows. To the left is a barn with a doorway and a segmental arch with voussoirs.
Hazlewood Cottages; 53.98094°N 1.86462°W	—	1824	Four cottages, later two houses, in stone, with a stone slate roof and stone coping. There are two storeys and four bays. On the front are four doorways with dated stone tablets over the middle doors, and the windows are sashes in plain surrounds.
