= Hazlewood, North Yorkshire =

Hamlet in North Yorkshire, England

Coordinates: 53.98018°N 1.86426°W

Hazlewood
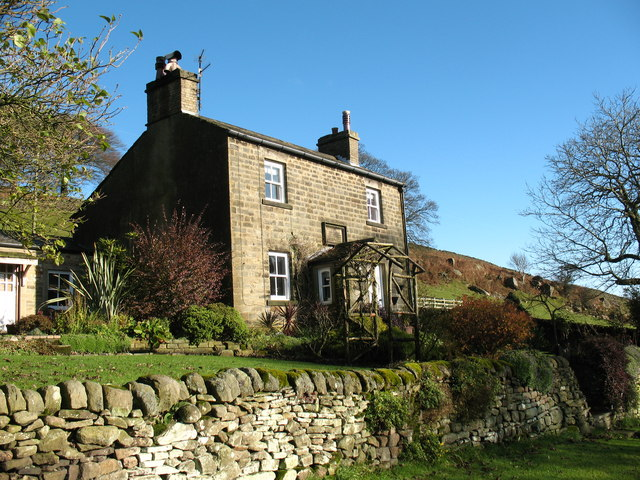
- Former School House

- Location within North Yorkshire
- OS grid reference: SE090538
- Civil parish: Hazlewood with Storiths
- Unitary authority: North Yorkshire
- Ceremonial county: North Yorkshire
- Region: Yorkshire and the Humber
- Country: England
- Sovereign state: United Kingdom
- Post town: SKIPTON
- Postcode district: BD23
- Police: North Yorkshire
- Fire: North Yorkshire
- Ambulance: Yorkshire

Hazlewood is a hamlet in the civil parish of Hazlewood with Storiths, in the English county of North Yorkshire.

Hazlewood lies to the east of the town of Skipton by 7.5 miles (12.1 km), and is located some two miles east of (across the River Wharfe from) Bolton Abbey.

== See also ==
- Listed buildings in Hazlewood with Storiths
