= Grand Ridge Rail Trail =

Rail trail in Victoria, Australia

Coordinates: 38°22′12″S 146°12′31″E

The Grand Ridge Rail Trail
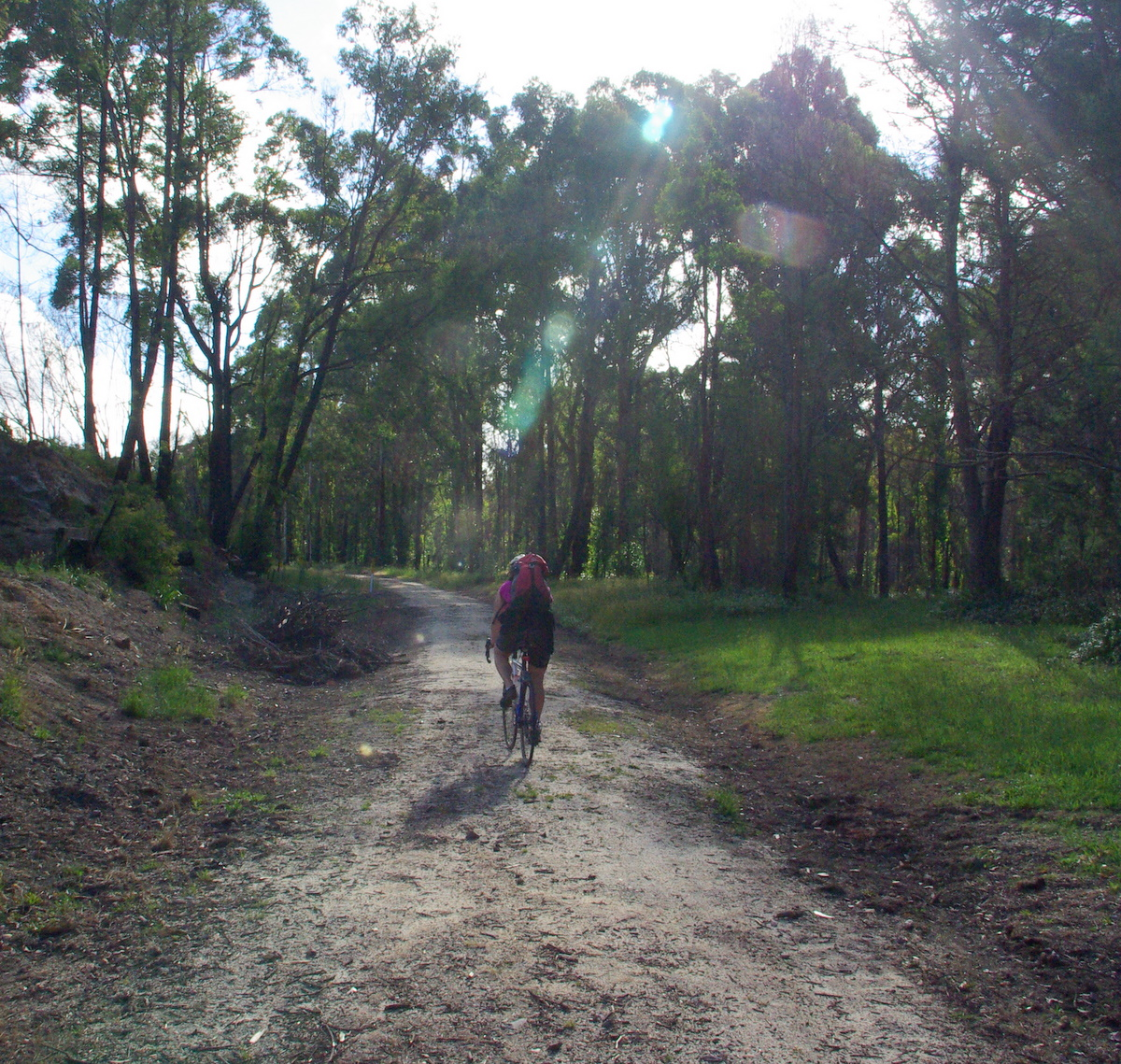
- Riding the trail
- Length: 13 km
- Location: Mirboo North, Victoria, Australia
- Difficulty: Easy
- Hazards: Some travel on, and crossings of, major highways
- Surface: Unsealed
- Hills: Approx 150m rise from Boolarra to Mirboo North
- Water: Available in Boolarra and Mirboo North
- Train(s): Although there are passenger trains to Morwell, it is 30km from Boolarra.

The Grand Ridge Rail Trail or Mirboo North to Boolarra Rail Trail is a 13 kilometre rail trail in the Strzelecki Ranges of west central Gippsland, connecting the towns of Mirboo North and Boolarra. The route follows the line of the former Mirboo North railway line for the entire distance.

In February 2009, the trail was closed due to bushfires burning out two bridges. Since then the bridges have been replaced and the trail has been re-opened with the official ceremony held in Feb 2012.

== Gallery ==
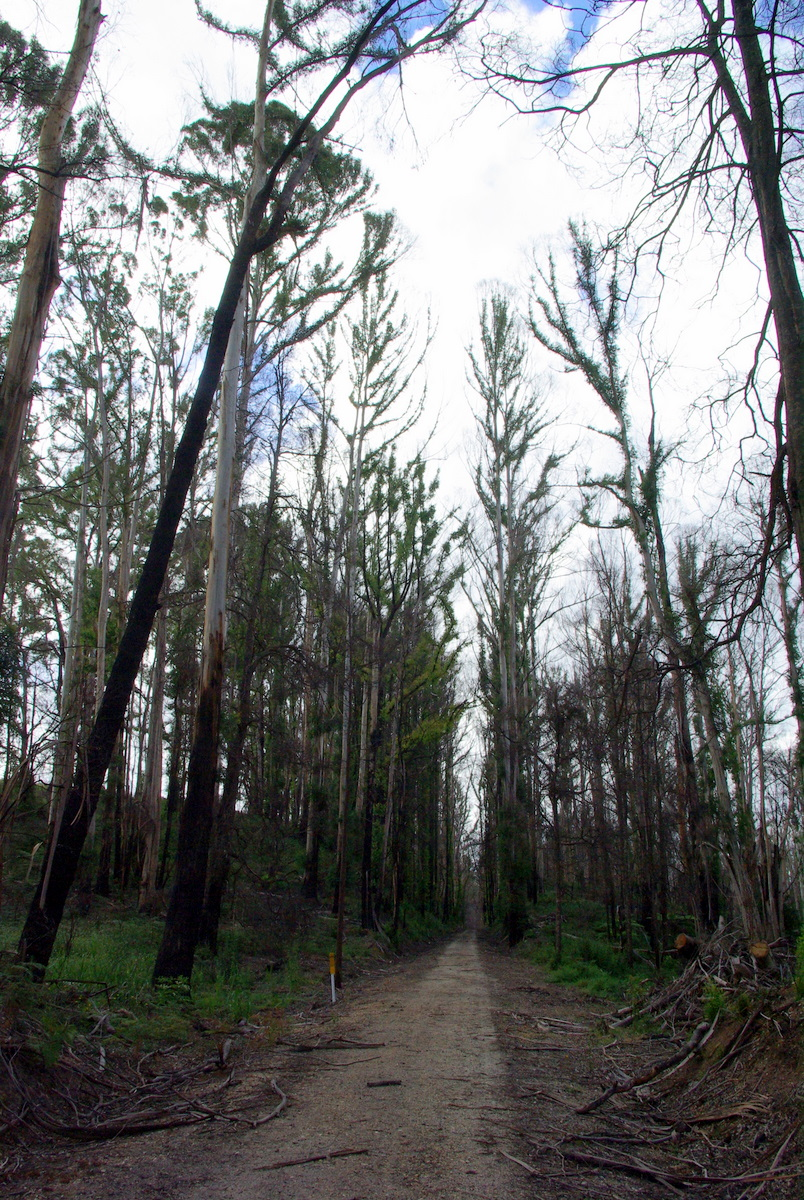

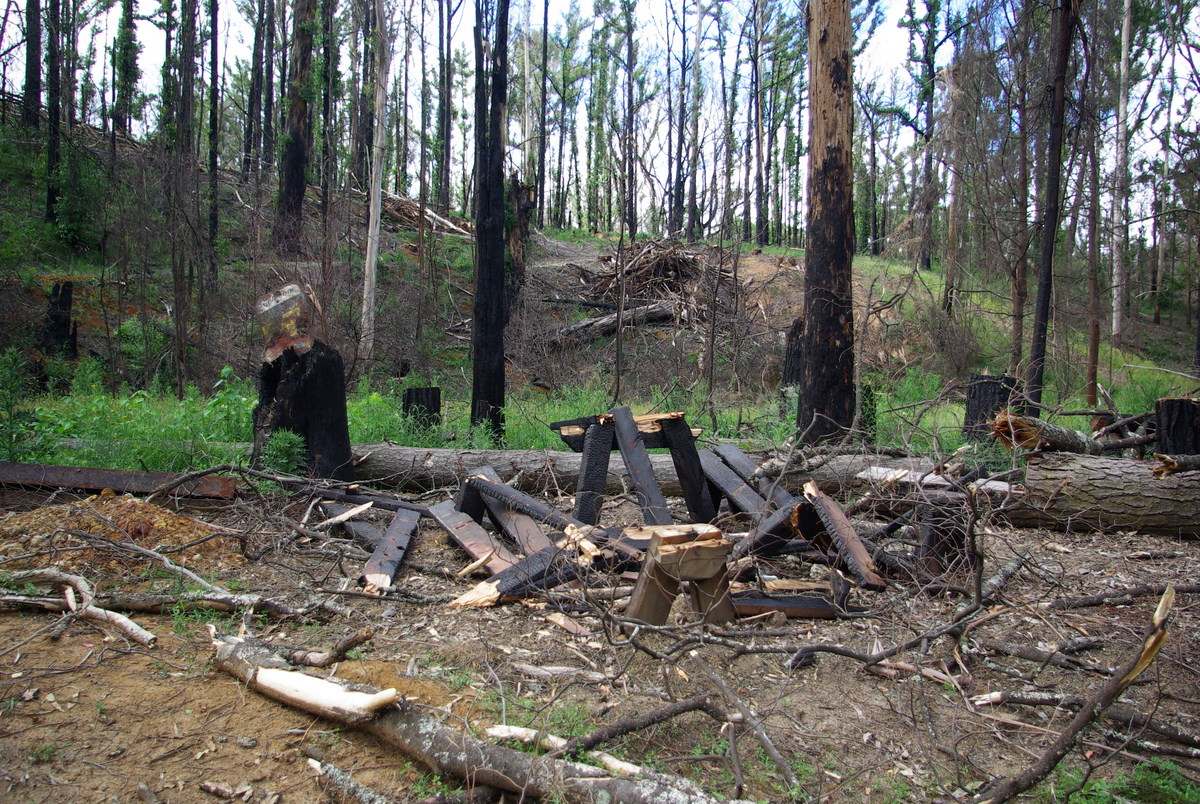
A burnt out picnic table, caused by the February 2009 bushfires

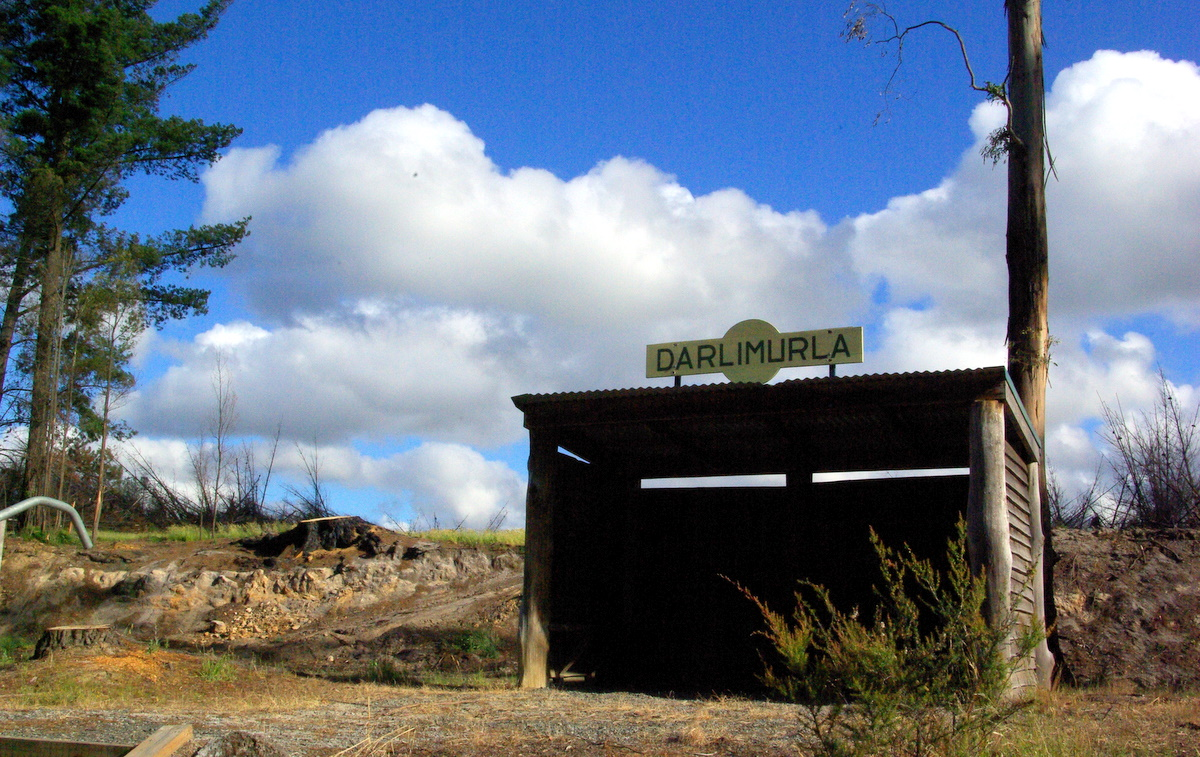

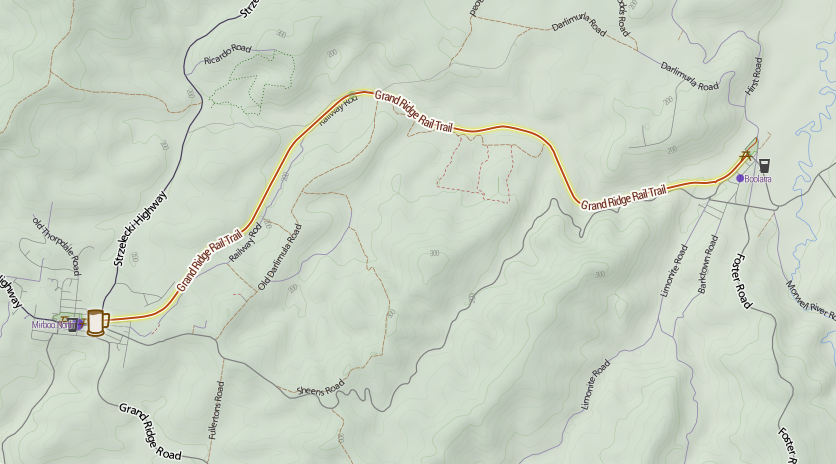
Map of the Grand Ridge Rail Trail.
