= Morwell =

- City
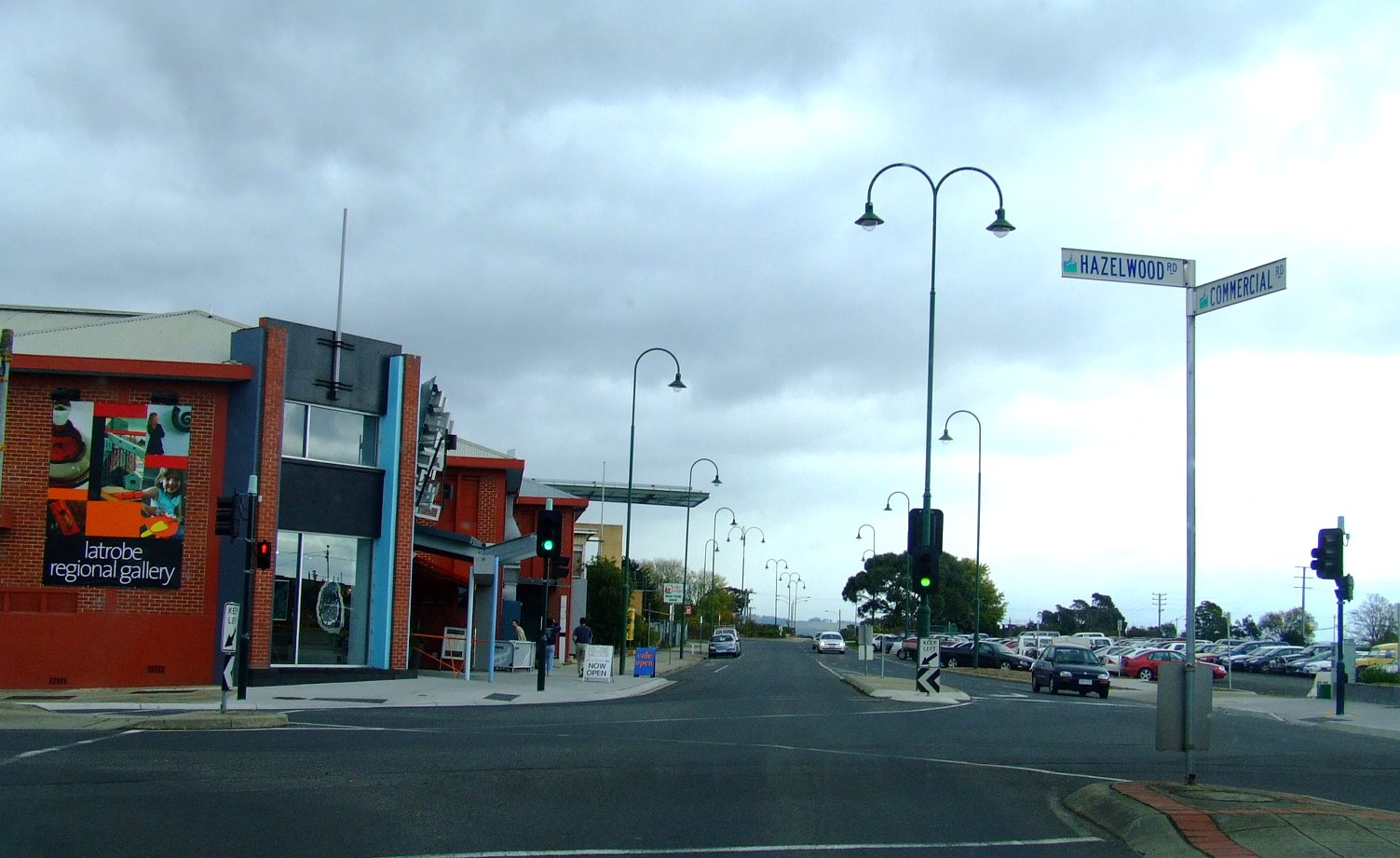
- Corner of Hazelwood and Commercial Roads, Morwell

- Coordinates: 38°14′S 146°24′E
- Country: Australia
- State: Victoria
- LGA: City of Latrobe
- Location: 152 km (94 mi) from Melbourne; 13 km (8.1 mi) from Traralgon; 132 km (82 mi) from Bairnsdale
- Established: 1870s

Government
  - State electorate: Morwell
  - Federal division: Gippsland

Area
  - Total: 44.9 km^{2} (17.3 sq mi)
- Elevation: 80 m (260 ft)

Population
  - Total: 14,389 (2021 census)
  - Density: 320.5/km^{2} (830.0/sq mi)
- Postcode: 3840
Localities around Morwell
Yallourn North	Yallourn North	Traralgon
Boolarra	Morwell	Hazelwood North
Yinnar	Churchill	Hazelwood North

Morwell is a town in the Latrobe Valley area of Gippsland, in South-Eastern Victoria, Australia approximately 152 km (94 mi) east of Melbourne.

Morwell has a population of 14,389 people at the 2021 census.

It is both the capital and administrative centre for the City of Latrobe and the city's second most populous town after the neighbouring Traralgon. Morwell is located in the centre of the Latrobe Valley urban area, which has a population of 77,168 at the 2021 Census and is home to many of the greater urban area's civic institutions, administrative functions and infrastructure.

Morwell's centenary rose garden located in the central business district, won an award in 2009 for being a 'garden of excellence'. Since 2018, the town has hosted the International Rose Garden Festival Morwell (IRGFM).

== Naming ==
The name of the town of Morwell is likely to be derived from a local Indigenous word from the Gunai language that means inhabitants of the swamp, referring to the Gunai clan that lived in the area. The nearby town of Moe was named after the Gunai word for swampland, which is a reference to the swamp between Moe and Yarragon that was drained in the 1890s.

From 1914, various newspaper editorials had stated that the name of Morwell comes from the Aboriginal words more willie meaning woolly possum. However, the Gunai word for possum is wadthan and the words wile or wollert come from Kulin words from the Woiwurrung language. The traditional lands of the Kulin nation intersect with the lands of the Gunai people to the west of Warragul, a town 50 km to the west of Morwell, which makes the naming unlikely to originate from a Kulin language. The town of Wollert, Victoria is named after this word for possum.

Morwell River was the first place to be recorded with the name Morwell, using the inconsistent spelling of Morewill River in the 1847 diary of Charles Tyers, Morewell River on an 1847 survey map and River Morewelle in an 1848 notice of pastoral leases. Peter Jeremiah Smith established the Morewell Hotel on the river in 1858 and the name of the early settlement around the hotel was recorded as Morwell Bridge in a government survey in 1861. The name of Morwell was used for the new location of the town centre that surrounded the Morwell railway station after it opened in 1877.

In 1942, station-hand Llew Vary suggested that the name of Morwell is derived from the English town of Morwell on the Morwell River in Cornwall, but lacked any records of the naming. Members of the Morwell Rotary Club and Methodist Church developed the idea further in 1946 and historian Ivan Maddern strongly advocated for the idea from 1962. Methodist ministers communicated with their counterparts in England, who explained that there was a Morwellham on the River Tamar, a 100m-high cliff-face by the river known as Morwell Rocks, a Morwell Barton and a Morwell Priory.

Another theory is that "Morewell" is a corruption of "Mary Ville", the original name of the Maryvale pastoral run established in 1845. The run was thought to be named after Mary, daughter of the Bennetts who established the Hazelwood station with Albert Brodribb to the south of Maryvale. However, the Morwell Historical Society wrote that the first recorded reference to "Morewell" was 1844.

== History ==
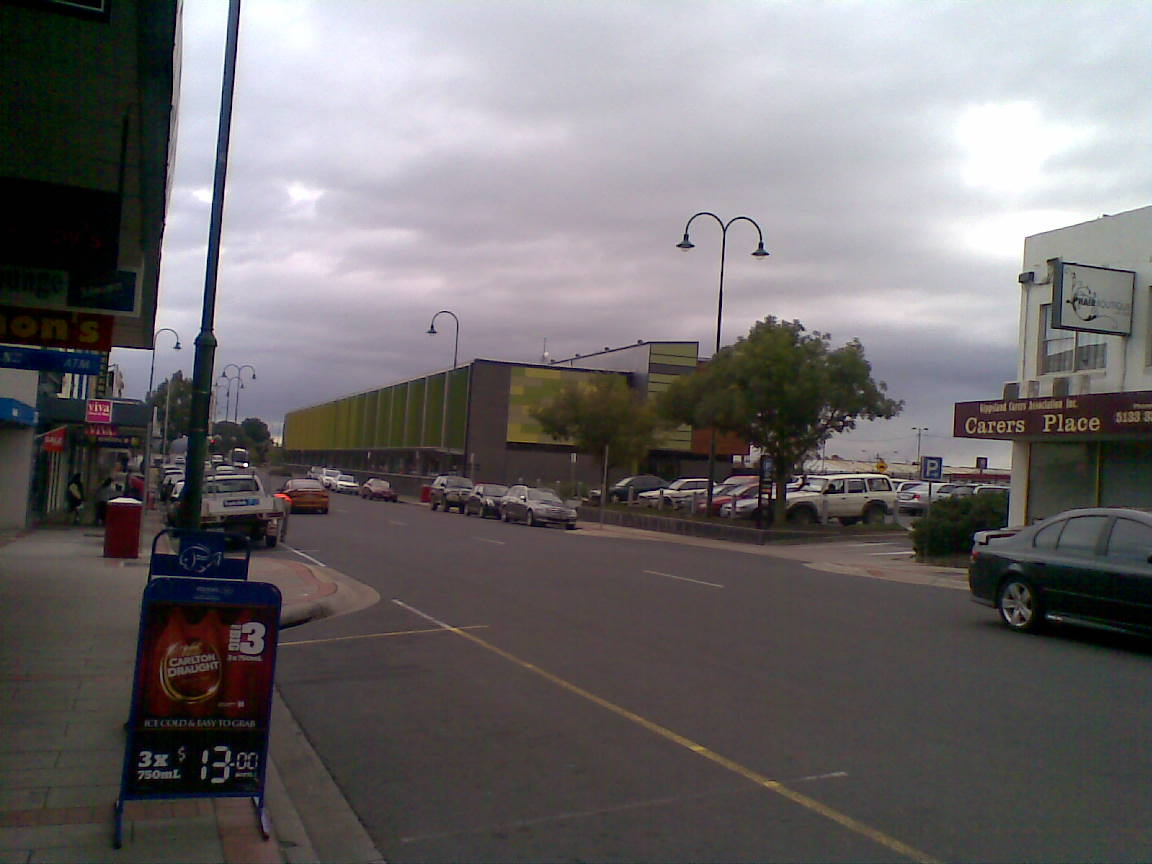
Commercial Road, Morwell's main street, looking towards the Latrobe City Corporate Headquarters

The earliest inhabitants of the Morwell district were the Braiakaulung people, one of the five Indigenous Australian clans of the Gunai/Kurnai nation. The Braiakaulung people manufactured stone tools, as long as 5,000 years ago, from silcrete quarries in the Haunted Hills, west of Morwell and the Gunai/Kurnai had lived in the region for more than 20,000 years, according to evidence found at the New Guinea II cave near Buchan, Victoria.

The first Europeans to travel through the area include party of Count Paweł Strzelecki on their journey from the Snowy Mountains in April 1840, after Strzelecki had named Australia's highest peak as Mount Kosciuszko. In 1838, Scottish pastoralist Angus McMillan rode horses up the Latrobe River near Sale, but not as far as Morwell, then made further journeys to Latrobe River after Strzelecki had visited the area. McMillan named the region as 'Caledonia Australis' after his homeland, but the preferred name was 'Gipps Land', later becoming Gippsland, as chosen by Strzelecki in honour of New South Wales Governor George Gipps.

The first Europeans to take land in Morwell were called squatters and ran pastoral leases such as the 17,300 acre Hasellwood (later called Hazelwood) established by Albert Eugene Brodribb and William Bennett in October 1844, the 22,900 acre Mary Ville (later called Maryvale) established by Thomas Gorringe in February 1845, the 24,780 acre Merton Rush station established by Henry Scott in 1846 and the 5,730 acre Scrubby Forest established by Nicol Brown and William Hunter in 1848.

The 1870s were a time of railway building in Victoria. In 1873, the government approved the construction of a railway line from Melbourne to Sale and it was this decision which gave rise to the development of the township of Morwell. The railway station was approximately 3 miles (5 km) from the settlement by the river, leading to new development occurring around the railway station.

The first public sale of land in the town took place in January 1879 but there were at least ten traders operating in the town by that time, a post office in the township having been open since 1875 (an earlier PO having served the rural area from 1870 to 1873). On 1 January 1880 Morwell PO was renamed Morwell Bridge and Morwell Railway Station PO (open since 1877) became the main Morwell PO.

A major Research and Development project into the conversion of brown coal into oil, (Brown Coal Liquefaction Victoria or BCLV) was established in Morwell in 1983/84. Funded by the Japanese Government at a cost of over one billion dollars this project established a 50 tonne per day pilot plant which ran until 1991.

Thriving on the success of the power industry, Morwell developed into a city offering substantial housing and financial opportunities for its many residents. With the general growth of the Latrobe Valley, Morwell's success appeared destined to continue. However, the approval by the City of Morwell to build the Mid Valley Shopping Centre complex away from the CBD led to the decline of the CBD, with many empty shopfronts the result. Further, restructuring and privatisation of the State Electricity Commission in the 1990s led to massive job losses in the region, which accelerated the decline of Morwell's central business district. Many shops are now empty and in a state of disrepair.

Amalgamation of the local councils following a statewide review of local government boundaries in 1994 saw Morwell become part of the City of Latrobe and the civic centre established in Traralgon. With the re-establishment of an elected council, the civic centre was moved back to Morwell and the new council building constructed in 2005 in the hope of leading to a revitalisation of the city centre. Unfortunately, that revitalisation failed to eventuate. The new justice precinct was completed in 2006 and has somewhat increased CBD activity as alleged criminals come to the Morwell justice precinct for processing through the justice system.

Figures released by the Australian Bureau of Statistics in March 2011 show the average wage of Morwell residents to be the lowest of the three major Latrobe Valley towns.

Morwell is the headquarters of the Central Gippsland Institute of Technical and Further Education. It also is home to the Latrobe Regional Gallery, a major regional art gallery with an excellent local collection, and is noted for its extensive rose gardens. Nearby at Churchill is the Gippsland Campus of Federation University. A commemorative bust of Lt Gen Sir Stanley Savige was erected in 2006. Born in Morwell, Savige founded Legacy Australia following World War 1 to assist widows and families of servicemen.

Morwell is home to the Morwell Centenary Rose Garden, a parkland of over 2 hectares on a former railway reserve that showcases over 3500 roses. In 2009, the garden was presented an 'Award of Garden Excellence' by the World Federation of Rose Societies.

Throughout April–July 2025, Morwell experienced an economic boom during the mushroom murder trial of Erin Patterson, who was found guilty of the four charges (three of murder and another of attempted murder) laid against her.

== Geography ==
=== Climate ===
Morwell experiences an oceanic climate (Köppen climate classification Cfb). Nights in Morwell are about 2 °C colder than in Melbourne.

Climate data for Morwell (Latrobe Valley Airport, 1984–2020); 56 m AMSL; 38.21° S, 146.47° E
Month	Jan	Feb	Mar	Apr	May	Jun	Jul	Aug	Sep	Oct	Nov	Dec	Year
Record high °C (°F)	45.4 (113.7)	46.3 (115.3)	40.4 (104.7)	35.0 (95.0)	26.7 (80.1)	23.5 (74.3)	22.0 (71.6)	26.8 (80.2)	31.4 (88.5)	35.1 (95.2)	38.6 (101.5)	42.2 (108.0)	46.3 (115.3)
Mean daily maximum °C (°F)	26.7 (80.1)	26.7 (80.1)	24.5 (76.1)	20.6 (69.1)	16.9 (62.4)	14.1 (57.4)	13.8 (56.8)	15.0 (59.0)	17.1 (62.8)	19.6 (67.3)	22.1 (71.8)	24.5 (76.1)	20.1 (68.2)
Mean daily minimum °C (°F)	13.0 (55.4)	12.9 (55.2)	11.4 (52.5)	8.8 (47.8)	6.4 (43.5)	4.3 (39.7)	3.7 (38.7)	4.3 (39.7)	5.9 (42.6)	7.5 (45.5)	9.6 (49.3)	11.4 (52.5)	8.3 (46.9)
Record low °C (°F)	1.8 (35.2)	1.9 (35.4)	1.9 (35.4)	−0.5 (31.1)	−2.8 (27.0)	−3.6 (25.5)	−4.8 (23.4)	−3.4 (25.9)	−2.6 (27.3)	−2.3 (27.9)	0.6 (33.1)	1.7 (35.1)	−4.8 (23.4)
Average precipitation mm (inches)	50.7 (2.00)	40.8 (1.61)	47.4 (1.87)	57.7 (2.27)	54.0 (2.13)	64.6 (2.54)	62.4 (2.46)	65.4 (2.57)	73.9 (2.91)	73.7 (2.90)	75.0 (2.95)	65.0 (2.56)	729.4 (28.72)
Average precipitation days (≥ 0.2 mm)	9.4	8.5	10.7	13.3	15.9	18.4	19.1	18.9	17.0	14.9	13.4	12.0	171.5
Average afternoon relative humidity (%)	46	46	48	55	64	68	67	61	59	56	54	49	56

== Governance ==
At local level, Morwell is governed by the City of Latrobe and is both the seat of local government and administrative centre. It is represented at local level by two councilors in the Central Ward (formerly by three wards – Rintoull in the city's centre; Tanjil, the north and west; and Firmin, the south).

In the Government of Victoria it is represented in the Victorian Legislative Assembly by the Electoral district of Morwell. The state is responsible for law and order in Morwell. The Latrobe Valley Law Courts located opposite council headquarters in Commercial Road which has branches for the Supreme Court of Victoria, Magistrates' Court of Victoria and County Court of Victoria. It is served by a single Victoria Police police station on Hazelwood Road.

In the Government of Australia, it is represented in Parliament of Australia by the Division of Gippsland.

== Education ==
Morwell has education facilities from preschool education through to vocational education and training. University-level qualifications are available nearby at Federation University Australia, Gippsland campus which is located in the adjacent town of Churchill. Other education and training provider are located in the wider Latrobe Valley urban area. The city has 4 primary schools - Morwell Central Primary School, St Vincent De Paul Primary, Sacred Heart Primary and Morwell Park Primary and a single junior secondary school – Kurnai College Morwell Campus (est 1963). TAFE study in Morwell is available via TAFE Gippsland (initially GippsTAFE, then Federation Training later), as well as apprenticeships and traineeships through Apprenticeships Group Australia.

== Transport ==
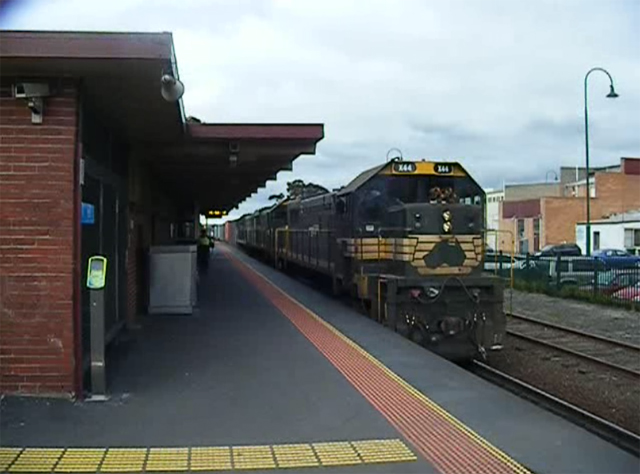
Morwell railway station

The Princes Freeway (A1) bypasses the town to the south while the old Princes Highway which once passed through east–west through its centre is now Princes Drive and Commercial Road. The highway connects Morwell with other Latrobe Valley cities including Moe to the west and Traralgon to the east. Other main roads include the Strzelecki Highway (B460) running south toward Leongatha.

Rail transport includes both passenger rail and freight rail. The town's only station is Morwell railway station which is on the Bairnsdale line. Both the Traralgon V/Line rail service and the Bairnsdale V/Line rail service stop there with a two way hourly service. Travel time to Melbourne ranges from approximately 109 minutes during peak travel times.

General aviation operates from Latrobe Regional Airport which services the whole Latrobe Valley urban area.

== Industry ==
Morwell is known for its role as a major energy production centre for Victoria as the centre of a major coal mining and fossil-fuel power generation industry, such as Hazelwood Power Station, Energy Brix Power Station, Yallourn Power Station, Loy Yang Power Station and the coal mines feeding them.

== Sport ==
Australian rules football is popular in Morwell. There are two senior clubs in the city: the Morwell Football Club (est 1905) based at the Morwell Recreation Reserve, compete in the Gippsland Football League, while the Morwell East Football Club (est 1973), based at the Morwell East Football Ground compete in the Mid Gippsland Football League. The Morwell Football Ground is home to the Gippsland Power (est 1993) which compete in the TAC Cup and has hosted Australian Football League pre-season matches in 2005 and 2010.

Cricket is also popular with two senior cricket clubs, Morwell and Latrobe, the latter of which Peter Siddle played for in his younger days.

Soccer has a long history in Morwell. The Morwell Falcons were formed in 1961, were crowned State Champions in 1984 and 1989 and Dockerty Cup champions in 1994. They were eventually promoted to the National Soccer League in 1992, the top league in Australia at the time.

The club is now known as Falcons 2000 and plays in the Latrobe Valley Soccer League, the eighth level of soccer in Victoria, and the ninth nationally. The club's home ground is Latrobe City Stadium.

Fortuna 60 and Morwell Pegasus both compete in the Latrobe Valley Soccer League, their home grounds being Crinigan Road South Reserve and Ronald Reserve respectively. From 2025 onwards, Fortuna 60 will compete in the Victorian State League, where they have been added to the Men's State League 5 South. The club's LVSL Men's 2nd Division, women's and junior teams will still play in the LVSL.

Morwell was also a long-time hub of indoor soccer and Futsal with the Morwell Leisure Centre - then known as the Morwell Indoor Sports Centre – hosting the Victorian State Indoor Soccer Championships in 1986.

The Morwell Cougars Baseball Club usually forms teams in three senior grades and all junior grades of the Latrobe Valley League. Their diamonds in Toners Lane are the only dedicated diamonds in the League.

American football is played at Maryvale Recreation Reserve. This is also the home of the local club Gippsland Gladiators which has been based there since 2010, competing in Division 2, of the Gridiron Victoria league.

There is also a 25-metre indoor swimming pool, used by the local swimming club for competitive swimming.

Golfers play at the course of the Morwell Golf Club on Fairway Drive.

== Media ==
Commercial radio stations 531 3GG, 94.3/97.9 Triple M Gippsland, 99.5 TRFM & Gold 1242 service Morwell and the greater Gippsland region. National public broadcaster ABC Gippsland broadcasts on 100.7FM and community station Gippsland FM (Formerly 3GCR) on 104.7FM.

Gippsland FM is the only station in the region with a studio complex in Morwell.

The Latrobe Valley Express is published in Morwell twice per week and covers events and happenings in the Latrobe Valley and wider Gippsland area.

== Notable people ==
- Paul Abbott, AFL Footballer
- Ben Ainsworth, AFL Footballer
- Veronica Gorrie, Aboriginal Australian writer
- John Hutchinson, Coach and former Soccer player
- Changkuoth Jiath, AFL Footballer
- Chips Mackinolty, Radical poster artist and journalist
- Rocky Mattioli, Italian–Australian World Champion Boxer
- Paul Morris, Motor racer
- Bryan Quirk, footballer
- Peter Siddle, Cricketer
- Cathie Reid, businesswoman
- Archie Thompson, footballer
- John Trevorrow, Australian champion Road cyclist.
- Vin Waite, footballer

== See also ==
- HM Prison Morwell River
