= Churchill, Victoria =

Churchill
- Town
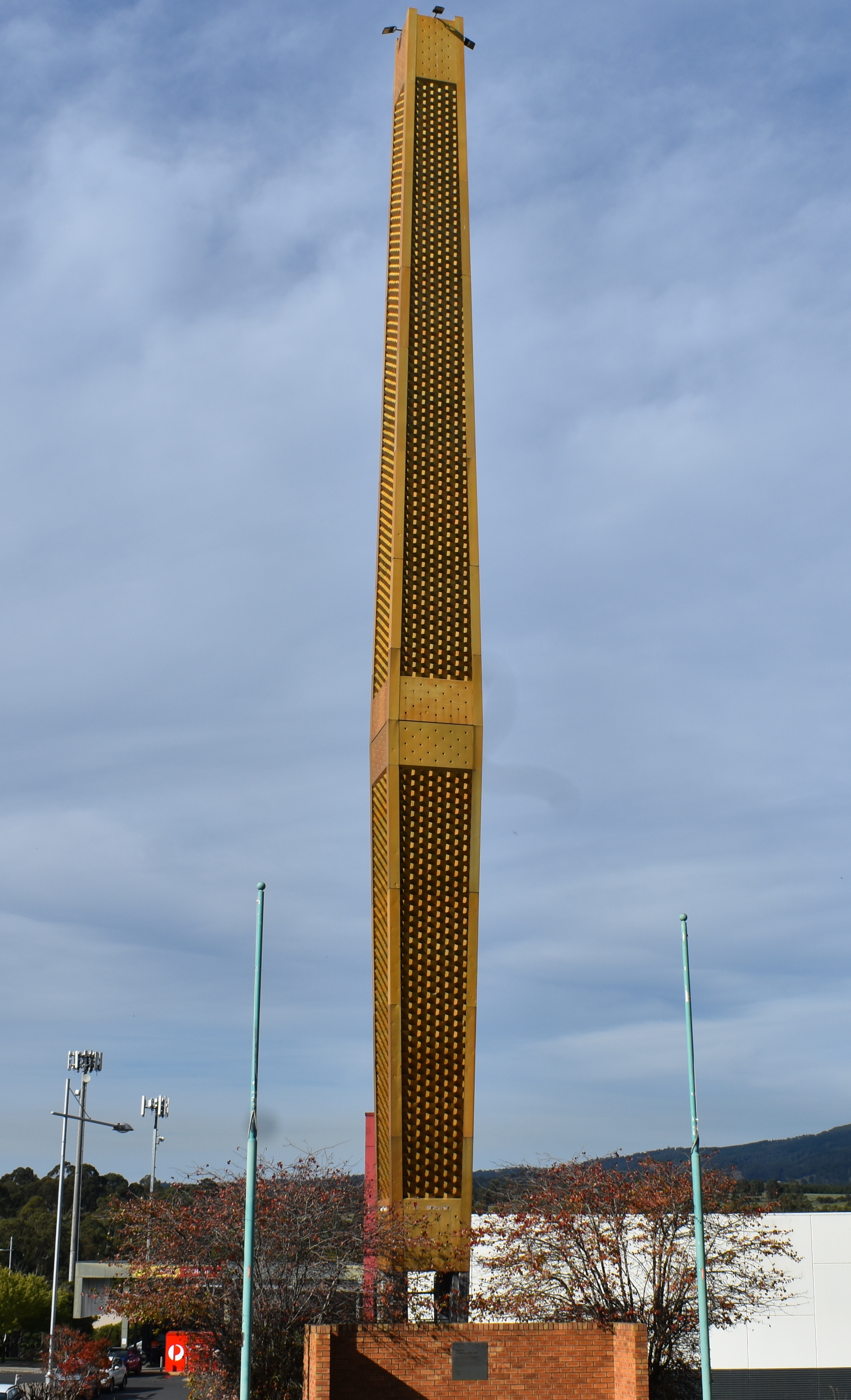
- Churchill's 'Big Cigar' monument in 2026

- Coordinates: 38°19′S 146°25′E
- Country: Australia
- State: Victoria
- LGA: City of Latrobe
- Location: 160 km (99 mi) from Melbourne; 11 km (6.8 mi) from Morwell
- Established: 1965

Government
  - State electorate: Morwell
  - Federal division: Gippsland

Population
  - Total: 4,924 (2021 census)
- Postcode: 3842
Localities around Churchill
Hazelwood	Morwell	Traralgon
Yinnar	Churchill	Hazelwood North
Boolarra	Yinnar South	Jeeralang

Churchill is a town in the Latrobe Valley, located in central Gippsland in the east of Victoria, Australia. The town had a population of 4,924 at the 2021 census, and is part of the Latrobe City local government area. The town was named in honour of former British prime minister Sir Winston Churchill, who had died earlier in the year the town's establishment was announced.

== Town history ==
Established as a service centre for the Hazelwood Power Station, Churchill was intended to house workers in the region as the State Electricity Commission of Victoria expanded its coal mining operations. Announcing the commencement of construction, Minister for Housing Lindsay Thompson claimed that "it was doubtful whether any Victorian town had been more carefully planned." Most of the early housing was constructed by the Housing Commission of Victoria. The site was chosen for its pleasant location at the foot of the Strzelecki Ranges, overlooking Hazelwood pondage. It was relatively free from air pollution, is not above rich coalfields and is in close proximity to the larger towns and power stations in the Latrobe Valley.

Construction of Churchill began in 1965. In that year the first two houses in Churchill were completed and occupied by the Arch and Ayers families who received morning paper deliveries from Yinnar General Store, and milk delivery from John Koedijk. Within a week five more families arrived and so the town began to grow street by street. The town was sufficiently advanced for the Post Office to open on 11 April 1966. The shopping centre in Churchill was officially opened in July 1967, the first two shops (butcher and pharmacy) having opened 19 May 1967. In that year many new traders opened for business. All the shop keepers were offered a Housing Commission house in Churchill for their use. The Churchill Newsagency opened in 1967 and was run by Ian and Winifred Jones, who had previously run the Yinnar General Store. A Tattersalls agency was established in 1975. The Churchill Newsagency business was later purchased in April 1978 by Jack and Olive Robson

The town was planned by Melbourne architect Best Overend with a well-defined commercial centre, expansive parklands, a mix of government and privately owned quarter-acre (1,000 m^{2}) town blocks and light industrial estates spaced from residential areas by a belt of parkland. The transport system was to be a network of restricted-access highways and a ring road fully encircling the town. Population was anticipated to reach 6,000 by 1971, rising to around 40,000 by 2000. However, the discovery of offshore gas in Bass Strait resulted in the closure of the Lurgi gas plant to the town's north, and the SEC's development in the region slowed. This, combined with the slow development of services in the town and prohibitive residential sales conditions meant that the Churchill project would never be fully realised. Population peaked at a modest 5500 in the early 1990s before a small decline. Signs of renewed growth have appeared, with several new housing estates being released during the past decade, especially after the regional tree change population boom due to the COVID-19 pandemic.

After closing in 2006 the Churchill hotel was remodelled, and reopened in January 2011.

In 2009 Churchill suffered the devastation of the Black Saturday bushfires. Lit deliberately on Glendonald Rd, these fires burnt the surrounding hills of Churchill through to Yarram and killed eleven people.

== Names ==
Churchill was originally to be given the name Hazelwood as per the surrounding district; however, shortly before construction began, it was announced by Lindsay Thompson that the name given was to be Churchill. Thompson claimed the town would "prove a fitting town to bear the name of a man whose leadership, courage and oratory lifted the free world from the depths of despair to the heights of victory". This decision was not universally popular, and Hazelwood residents were soon lobbying to retain the established local name. Thompson responded in the press that it would be "greatest insult possible" to Churchill's name to revert to the old name, adding that he was "surprised that there were people who apparently would not be proud to have their town named after the man acknowledged as the 20th century’s greatest statesman." A 'group of irate Hazelwood citizens' petitioned to restore the name Hazelwood, on the grounds that 'the use of the name Churchill for the new town would eventually cause the whole district to lose its identity.' The Hazelwood Citizens' Committee continued to fight to restore the original name in subsequent years. Residents who pushed hard to restore the Hazelwood name were finally heard in 1989, when a vote was held. The name Churchill won narrowly.

Some of the names in Churchill have a distinctly local flavour. Estates in the town were named after various white settler families. These include Silcock, Medew, McMillan, and Glendonald. Roads have also been named after people (such as McDonald, Canterbury, Philip, and Manning), flora (Acacia, Hawthorn, Blackwood and Birch), or given Aboriginal names (Amaroo, Gundaroo).

== Population ==
In the 2021 Census, there were 4,924 people in Churchill. 75.9% of people were born in Australia. The next most common country of birth was England at 3.2%. 83.1% of people only spoke English at home. The most common responses for religion were No Religion 39.6% and Catholic 18.3%.

== Landmarks ==
Churchill Cigar
Churchill has an outstanding landmark, a tall square "golden" tower. The Housing Commission called for tenders for its design and construction in 1967. It was not designed with any intention of referencing Winston Churchill's famous cigar, but merely as an item of interest. Near its base is a commemorative brick wall built by the Rotary Club of Hazelwood which gives the names of the first families to move into the town.

Binishell
The Binishell located at the Federation University (formerly Monash University Gippsland Campus) was once a prominent feature visible from much of the eastern side of town. This was pulled down due to safety concerns. Instead of replacing the Binishell, a total of $5.5m of Federal Government and University funds went towards the construction of a replacement building overlooking the campus lake.

Mathison Park
Close to Morwell [ 11 km or 7m] is Mathison Park. Mathison Park has a circumnavigating walking track around Lake Hyland. The walking track in the southern end continues through to near Northways Road. Actually this pathway junctions into Northways walking path. Within Mathison Park itself are two BBQ facilities. Both fairly near to a unisex toilet facility, and multiple use fresh water drinking fountain, children's play park and an exercise external gym and fitness set of equipment.
All around this park numerous native trees and shrub are planted on a yearly basis thanks to the industrious voluntary working bee group.
Following the death of Tom Lawless many acres were donated to Mathison Park. Near the larger of the BBQ areas and the toilet facility / children's play area is a footpath junction is a large boulder. A plaque on the Tom Lawless Memorial boulder makes reference to Tom Lawless, his years of service, and the donation.
Often seen in the early mornings are the numerous people out walking, running or cycling by themselves, in groups, with or without their dogs. Mathison Park has many people utilising these pathways every day, and at all times of the day.

Lake Hyland

The shores of Lake Hyland are within Mathison Park. Over the years many different activities continue to occur on these shores, such as the building of the Remote Control Model Power Boat Drivers Stand built in 1996. A variety of trees and plants continue to be planted around the surrounds of the lake Hyland. This has now been enhanced with the walking path and fishing decks that were completed in 2005. The Lake continually has fish added to the eco-system for recreational fishing (and in November a once a year fishing competition).

== Education ==
Churchill has several education facilities. There are several primary schools within the town, as well as the Churchill and Precinct campuses of Kurnai College.

Federation University Australia
Federation University Australia, Gippsland campus (formerly Monash University Gippsland) is located in the town, and is a major employer with approximately 400 staff.

Gippsland Education Precinct
Gippsland Education Precinct includes the colocation of Kurnai College's VCE/senior Campus, Central Gippsland Institute of TAFE (aka. GippsTAFE) and Gippsland Group Training (Apprenticeships Victoria). The precinct aims to increase youth engagement in the transition from secondary school to tertiary education, training and employment.

Kurnai College - Churchill Campus
"The Churchill Campus is set adjacent to a picturesque lake and wildlife corridor. The school has a variety of outdoor and sporting fields with easy access to Federation University and the Latrobe Leisure Centre which incorporates an indoor 25-metre pool and gymnasium facilities."

Primary Schools

- Churchill Primary School
- Churchill North Primary School
- Lumen Christi Catholic Primary School

== Sport ==
Australian Rules Football Club
The town has an Australian Rules football team competing in the North Gippsland Football League, known originally as Hazelwood-Churchill and now as the "Churchill Cougars". They have been the premiers of the North Gippsland Football League on three occasions. They have also won seven Mid Gippsland Football League premierships prior to joining the North Gippsland league. The town also has a junior team competing in the Traralgon and District Junior Football League, under the same name, in the Under 10, Under 12, Under 14 and Under 16's divisions.

Soccer Club
Soccer is represented by Churchill United (nicknamed The Rams) who play in the Latrobe Valley Soccer League. The club's home ground is Hazelwood South Reserve on Tramway Road, which has steadily received major upgrades, including to the pavilion, changerooms and playing surface in 2024.

The club was formed in 1969 and after some early struggles as the township emerged, became a major force in the LVSL, winning a trio of league titles in 2007, 2008 and 2009. The Rams won the title again in 2012 and 2014. The club has also won six Battle of Britain Cup titles (1998, 2006, 2007, 2008, 2012, 2013), while its women's side won three straight LVSL titles in 2011, 2012 and 2013.

Hockey Club
Churchill is also home to a field hockey club. Churchill Hockey Club plays within the Latrobe Valley Hockey Association and fields Under 8's, Under 12's, Under 16's, senior Women's and Men's teams.

Golf Club
The town also has a golf club, known as the "Churchill and Monash Golf Club".

Pony Club
On the banks of Hazelwood Pondage can also be found the Jeeralang Pony Club grounds owned and operated by Goomba.

Baseball Club
The Churchill Braves play throughout winter with their home ground located at Andrews Park West, shared with the cricket club. The club were Latrobe Valley Baseball Association A-Grade champions in both the 2011 and 2012 seasons. They Accept Juniors from as young as 5 for T-Ball through to seniors.

Basketball Club
There are basketball clubs in Churchill for both senior and junior players. The senior club currently only runs competition for male players at Churchill Leisure Centre, but it used to run competition for the female players as well. The junior basketball club, The Blue Devils, runs competitions for Under 8s (mixed), Under 10s, Under 12s, Under 14s and Under 16s for both boys and girls. The summer season normally runs from October through to February and the winter season runs from April to September.

Cricket Club

The Churchill "Cobras" Cricket Club play at the George Cain Oval, located at Andrews Park West.
