= Hazelwood House, Glasgow =

Hazelwood House
- Interactive map of Hazelwood House

General information
- Status: Grade B Listed, Conservation Area
- Type: Stone and slate
- Location: 52 First Gardens, Dumbreck, Glasgow, G41, First Gardens, Dumbreck, Glasgow, Scotland
- Completed: 1882

Design and construction
- Architect: James Milne Monro

Other information
- Parking: Limited parking in front of house.

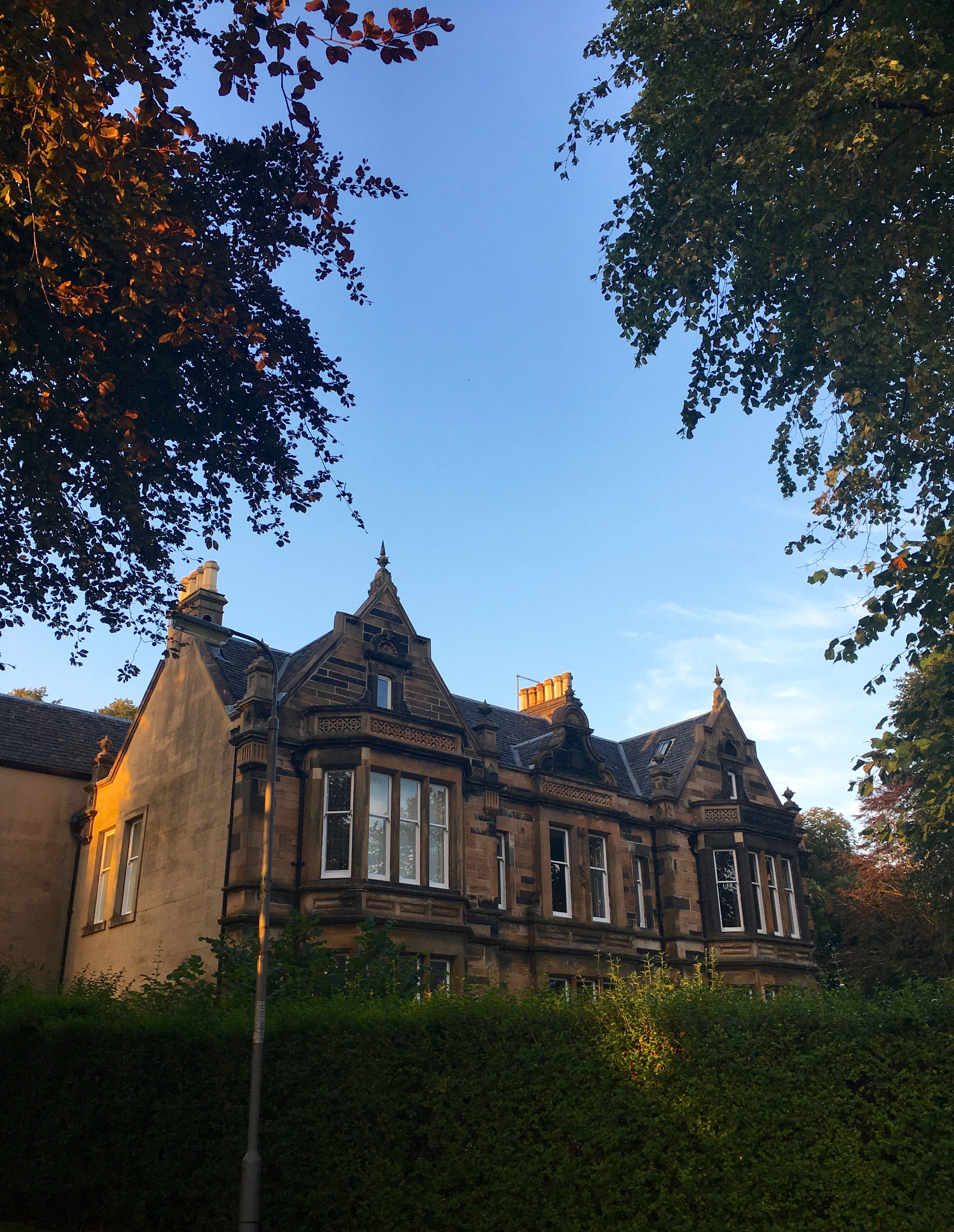
Hazelwood House, Glasgow

Hazelwood House is a B listed building in Glasgow. It was designed in the manner of the Arts and Crafts movement. Built in 1882, it is located in the suburb of Dumbreck adjacent to Bellahouston Park, and was one of the first buildings in Glasgow to enjoy a domestic electricity supply.

== History ==
Hazelwood House first appears on maps in 1890.

The house was designed by James Milne Monro. It was later improved by Robert Cumming in 1913.

It is known as the main building in the four street area known as "Glasgow's Electric Suburb" because the houses were the first in Glasgow to be built with internal electrical wiring – including electric lights and electric cookers.

In 1918 Hazelwood House became a 40-bed Red Cross Hospital, having been handed over by its owner J.B. Shanks. Following its role as an auxiliary hospital during World War 1, it then became a British Red Cross Training Centre. Hazelwood House became the King Edward Memorial Home for retired nurses on November 18, 1922. It was handed over from the Red Cross Society for this purpose on a 99-year lease. Initially there were 25 bedrooms. In order to be eligible for a room the retired nurse must have been of Scottish birth or have done her professional work in Scotland. The first Matron was Miss Valentine RRC, a role she took on for 16 years. She did her nurse training at the Western Infirmary, Glasgow and spent four and a half years with the Army Nursing Service (Reserve). Miss JB Jeffrey was appointed Matron in 1938. She trained at the Royal Hospital for Sick Children, Glasgow and previously worked as a ward sister at Hairmyres Colony, East Kilbride, surgical ward sister Royal Hospital for Sick Children, Aberdeen. She had also been the Assistant and Acting matron of Dumfries and Galloway Royal Infirmary, Dumfries.

In the late 20th century it was used as a nursing home, before it was purchased in 2003 for religious activities and retreats.

Hazelwood House is within the Hazelwood Conservation Area, created on 8 March 2002.

The house serves as a religious retreat and conference centre. It hosts annual public events such as Christmas carol concerts and family days.

== Architecture and features ==
Its notable architectural features include symmetrical front bay windows, a Tudor arch over the front door and a slate roof.

A lodge is adjacent.

Substantial private gardens host a brick-walled, earthenware coping and mature trees.

== Access ==
The public can access the house on walking tours that take place during Doors Open Days each September.
