= Hazelwood, Victoria =

Hazelwood Victoria
- Coordinates: 38°19′S 146°21′E
- Population: 184 (2016 census)
- Postcode(s): 3840
- Location: 159 km (99 mi) E of Melbourne; 22 km (14 mi) S of Morwell; 10 km (6 mi) W of Churchill
- LGA(s): City of Latrobe
- County: Buln Buln
- State electorate(s): Morwell
- Federal division(s): Gippsland
Localities around Hazelwood:
Narracan	Morwell	Hazelwood North
Thorpdale	Hazelwood	Churchill
Mirboo North	Yinnar	Jeeralang Junction

Hazelwood is an area of Gippsland at the foot of the Strzelecki Ranges in Victoria, Australia. In the beginning the area acted as a service centre for the Hazelwood Power Station. Following the death of Sir Winston Churchill the town centre was renamed to Churchill, however many of the surrounding areas continue to carry the name Hazelwood.

== Population ==
In the 2016 Census, there were 184 people in Hazelwood. 90.0% of people were born in Australia and 95.0% of people only spoke English at home.

== Landmarks ==
Lake Hazelwood

Lake Hazelwood also known as Hazelwood Pondage is a man-made lake which was created as a cooling pond for the Hazelwood Power Station. This form of use keeps the water quite temperate all year round. Due to this the lake has become a popular destination for swimming and boating. On the shores of the lake there is park land, a pony club, caravan parks, boat launching areas and camp sites.

Hazelwood Power Station

The establishment of Hazelwood Power Station was vital in the beginning of Hazelwood.

== See also ==
- Churchill, Victoria
- Hazelwood North, Victoria
