= Hazelwood North =

- Town
- Coordinates: 38°16′S 146°29′E
- Country: Australia
- State: Victoria
- LGA: City of Latrobe
- Location: 155 km (96 mi) ESE of Melbourne; 7 km (4.3 mi) E of Morwell

Government
  - State electorate: Morwell
  - Federal division: Gippsland

Population
  - Total: 1,478 (2016 census)
- Postcode: 3840
Localities around Hazelwood North
Traralgon	Traralgon	Traralgon East
Morwell	Hazelwood North	Rosedale
Hazelwood South	Traralgon South	Calignee

Hazelwood North is a locality in Victoria, Australia. It has a population of 1478 (as of the 2016 census).

Max Cranwell, who died in a 2009 plane crash in Papua New Guinea, resided in Hazelwood North until his death.

Hazelwood North is so named due to its geographical orientation from the town "Hazelwood" - now known as Churchill, Victoria. Composed of mostly five acre blocks, the district functions primarily as a commuter town for those working in the nearby regional centres of Morwell and Traralgon. Historically the area was used by graziers and small-scale farmers. Hazelwood North is central to Federation University Churchill campus, and is approximately a 10-minute drive into central towns such as Churchill, Traralgon and Morwell.

The district is served by the public Hazelwood North Primary School, and the Hazelwood North town hall. Both of which are located along Church Road, which runs through the district's centre. The area is somewhat prone to bush and grass fires during the summer months, and was the scene of a relatively small outbreak during the 2009 black saturday bushfires. The Hazelwood North Fire Brigade, a volunteer brigade administered by the Country Fire Authority, serves the area.
