= Hazelwood, Pretoria =

Hazelwood
- Location within Gauteng Location within South Africa
- Coordinates: 25°46′42″S 28°15′27″E
- Country: South Africa
- Province: Gauteng
- Municipality: City of Tshwane
- Main Place: Pretoria

Area
  - Total: 1.58 km^{2} (0.61 sq mi)

Population (2011)
  - Total: 1,918
  - Density: 1,210/km^{2} (3,140/sq mi)

Racial makeup (2011)
  - Black African: 22.8%
  - Coloured: 2.4%
  - Indian/Asian: 2.6%
  - White: 71.2%
  - Other: 1.1%

First languages (2011)
  - Afrikaans: 46.7%
  - English: 34.6%
  - Sotho: 2.4%
  - Tswana: 2.4%
  - Other: 13.9%
- Time zone: UTC+2 (SAST)
- PO box: 4200

Hazelwood is a suburb in Pretoria, South Africa.
