= Blackdown Rings =

Archaeological site in England

Coordinates: 50.3543°N 3.8003°W

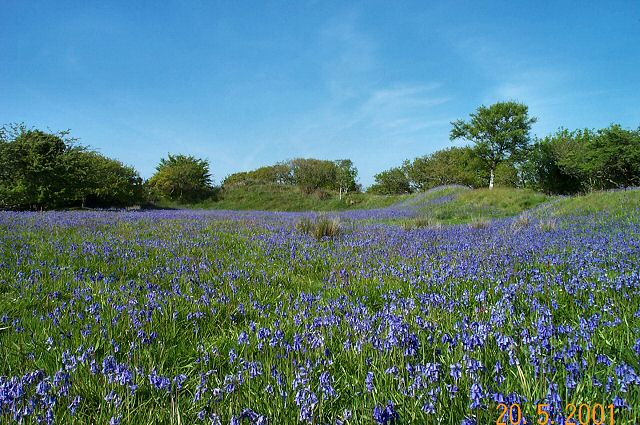
Blackdown Rings

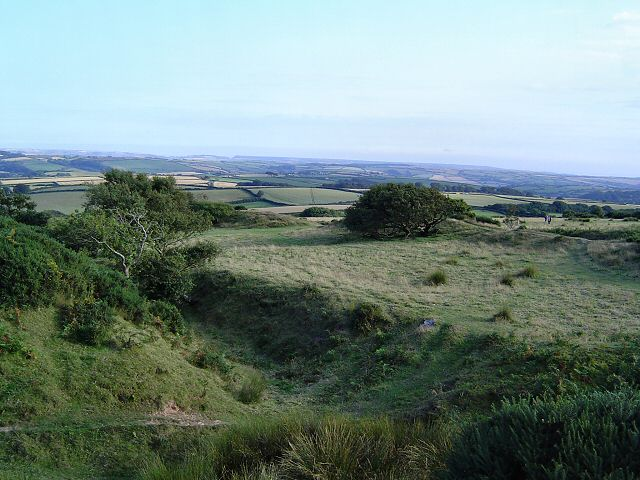
Blackdown Rings

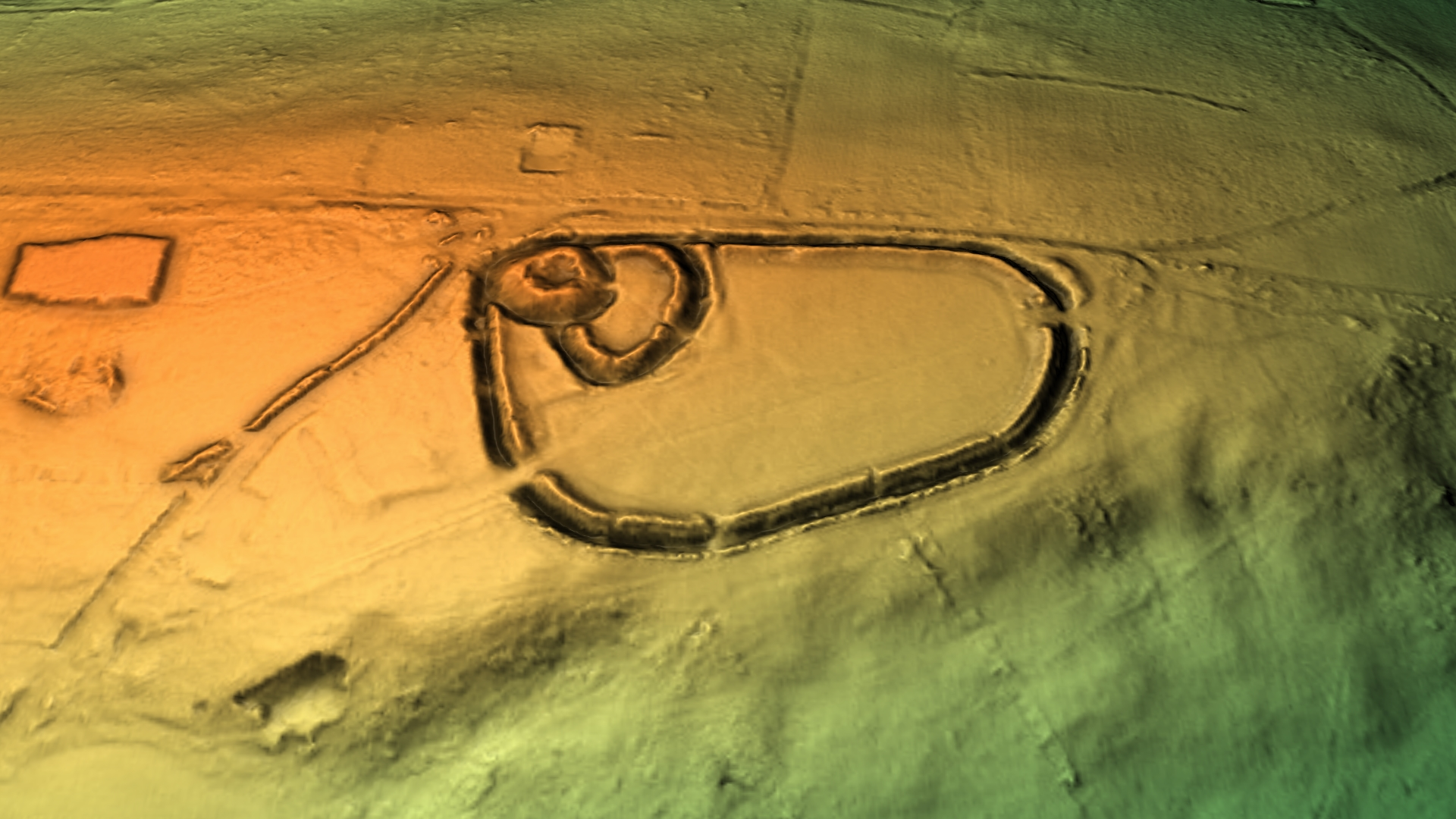
3D view of the digital terrain model

The Blackdown Rings are the earthworks of an Iron Age hill fort near the hamlet of Hazelwood in Devon, England. The fort is situated on a hilltop approximately 185 metres (607 ft) above sea level, in a commanding position above the River Avon.
