= Boolarra =

- Town
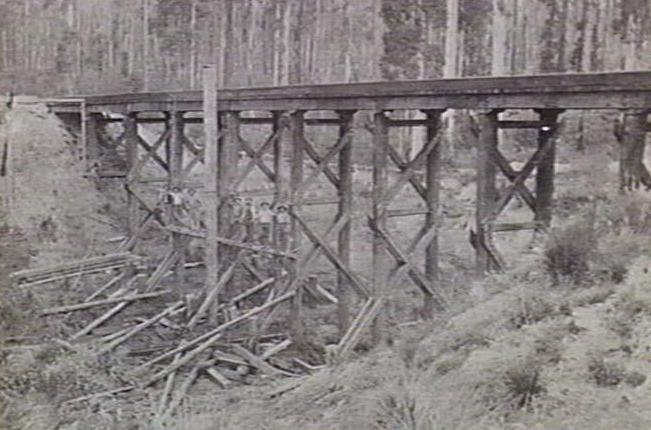
- Bridge between Boolarra and Darlimurla

- Coordinates: 38°23′S 146°16′E
- Country: Australia
- State: Victoria
- LGA: City of Latrobe
- Location: 158 km (98 mi) SE of Melbourne; 30 km (19 mi) SW of Morwell; 40 km (25 mi) NW of Leongatha
- Established: 1880s

Government
  - State electorate: Gippsland South, Morwell
  - Federal division: Gippsland, McMillan

Population
  - Total: 1,023 (2021 census)
- Postcode: 3870
Localities around Boolarra
| Narracan | Hernes Oak | Morwell |
| Narracan | Boolarra | Churchill |
| Mirboo North | Boolarra South | Yinnar |

Boolarra is a small township located in the Latrobe Valley, in central Gippsland, Victoria, Australia. At the 2016 Census, Boolarra had a population of 973 with 48% males and 52% females and an average age of 50. The Boolarra Folk Festival is held in the town every year in March and attracts music lovers from around Australia and the world. The town is also infamous for producing the Boolarra strain of carp (Cyprinus carpio) which, after their release into the Murray River near Mildura, spread throughout Australia.

The name Boolarra is believed to be derived from an expression in one of the local Aboriginal languages meaning 'plentiful' or 'twenty'. The Post Office opened on 1 September 1884 prior to the railway arriving in 1885.

The town is at one end of the Grand Ridge Rail Trail, which travels for 13 kilometres through temperate rainforest and dry sclerophyll forest in the Strzelecki Ranges. The original railway branch line from Morwell to Boolarra, was opened on 10 April 1885, with the last train being run on 22 June 1974. The railway was constructed through difficult hilly terrain requiring construction of massive embankments and numerous bridges.

The town has an Australian Rules football team competing in the Mid Gippsland Football League.

== History ==
Prior to colonisation, the Boolarra area was part of the country of the Gunaikurnai people, who had lived there for over 20,000 years.

The first European settler, W.H. Penaluna, arrived around 1878, taking up land along the Morwell River and erecting the Settlers' Arms Hotel. Land was quickly taken up, when a railway line was built in 1884‑5, connecting Mirboo North, Boolarra and Yinnar to Morwell, on the main Melbourne‑Sale line.

The hill country south and east of the Morwell River was opened up and a series of small communities, such as Budgeree, Gunyah, Ruyton Junction and English's Corner, began to flourish as goods and services flowed to and from Boolarra, which was the commercial and agricultural centre of the district.

Initially, the early settlers depended on timber and mixed farming for their livelihood. Blackwood for furniture and palings, cut from the surrounding forests, was freighted to Melbourne.

Butter, salted and packed on the farm, was also sent to the city. In 1905, the Danish firm Heyman set up a butter factory in Boolarra, and dairying became the main industry of the district. At that time, Boolarra's population rivalled that of Morwell.

At its peak, Boolarra supported three general stores, three hotels and four churches, along with two butchers, two bakers and three confectionery shops. Horses were harnessed and shod by two blacksmiths and the butter factory provided the bulk of employment for the town's youth. At one stage, a black coal and bauxite mine triggered an investment flow into the town.

In 1937, a large fire raged through Tarwin Street, destroying many of the original shop fronts.

After World War II, residents banded together to create a Memorial Park, with the names of the town's fallen soldiers inscribed on its gates.

== Today ==
Modernisation of farming and improved transport links have brought changes to many small rural towns, with car travel to the larger commercial centres in the Latrobe Valley increasing.

Boolarra, no longer a centre, has settled down to become an attractive town with a friendly rural atmosphere.

Farming is still important, as is timber, which is harvested from plantation forests in the hills. There has been an influx of new residents, retirees and young families from the city. The old railway line, closed in 1974, has become an attractive Rail ‑Trail bush walk from Boolarra to Mirboo North. The Old Boolarra Pub has been restored.

Numerous sporting clubs use the recreational facilities of the Memorial Park, a modern school and kindergarten provide educational facilities, and an historical society has converted the Old Boolarra School into a museum to preserve the local heritage.

Shops and cafes in Boolarra include the Boolarra Community Hotel, Boolarra Store (general store/cafe), post office, and the Boolarra Emporium.

In 2011, The Boolarra Australian Rules Football team, known as the Demons, won their first Mid-Gippsland premiership since 1997, defeating the Trafalgar Bloods.

== Boolarra Folk Festival ==
The Boolarra Folk Festival was first held in 2003 in Railway and Centenary Parks in Tarwin Street, Boolarra. The free, whole-day music concert is complemented by a large arts, craft and produce market.

== Newspaper ==
The Boolarra Link is a volunteer community newspaper published quarterly in March, June, October and December. The newspaper is published by the Latrobe Valley Express.

== See also ==
- Boolarra railway station
