= Hazlewood with Storiths =

Civil parish in North Yorkshire, England

Coordinates: 53.986°N 1.857°W

- Civil parish
- Population: 191 (2011 census)
- OS grid reference: SE093544
- Civil parish: Hazlewood with Storiths
- Unitary authority: North Yorkshire
- Ceremonial county: North Yorkshire
- Region: Yorkshire and the Humber
- Country: England
- Sovereign state: United Kingdom
- Post town: SKIPTON
- Postcode district: BD23
- Police: North Yorkshire
- Fire: North Yorkshire
- Ambulance: Yorkshire

Hazlewood with Storiths is a civil parish in the county of North Yorkshire, England. The population of the civil parish as of the 2011 census was 191.

Until 1974 it was part of the West Riding of Yorkshire. From 1974 to 2023 it was part of the Craven District, it is now administered by the unitary North Yorkshire Council.

== See also ==
- Listed buildings in Hazlewood with Storiths
