= Jeeralang =

- Town
- Coordinates: 38°24′S 146°28′E
- Country: Australia
- State: Victoria
- LGA: City of Latrobe
- Location: 176 km (109 mi) E of Melbourne; 32 km (20 mi) S of Traralgon; 16 km (9.9 mi) S of Churchill

Government
  - State electorate: Morwell
  - Federal division: Gippsland

Population
  - Total: 76 (2021 census)
- Postcode: 3840
- County: Buln Buln

Jeeralang is a locality in the Gippsland region of Victoria, Australia. The locality is 176 kilometres (109 mi) east of the state capital, Melbourne. At the 2006 census, Jeeralang and the surrounding area had a population of 589.

The locality was severely affected by the Black Saturday bushfires, including a fatality.
