= Yinnar South =

Town in Victoria, Australia

Coordinates: 38°23′S 146°23′E

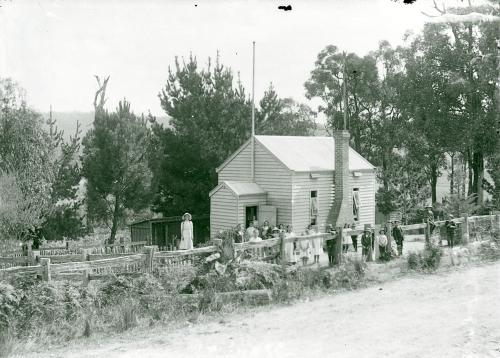
Yinnar South Primary School, 1914

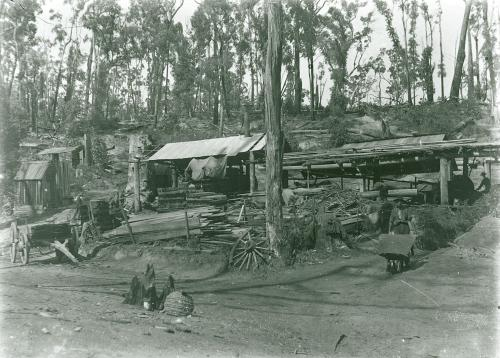
Grants Saw Mill, 1908

Yinnar South is a locality in the Latrobe Valley in Victoria, Australia.

According to the 2021 census, Yinnar South had a population of 675.

Previous higher figures were from Census 2006 and incorrectly combined both Yinnar and Yinnar South due to Census data compiled from postal area as opposed to geographical reference.

The first school in Yinnar South, School No. 2730, was opened 11 January 1886. It currently operates as a primary school.

Henry Collins set up his saw mill in Mill Road c. 1911 and built a tramline along Whitelaw's Track.

The town has a small church, approximately four metres by five metres, known as Holy Innocents. It was built in 1894 by James Mortan and painted by John Curtie. The church was licensed on 1 January 1895. Mortan built eight pews for the church as a gift; they remain in use. A small porch was later added to the building. The church is still in use today and is one of the smallest churches in Australia.

Yinnar South is well known for its prominent Dicksonia antarctica foliage.

The Yinnar South Community Hall is available for hire to members of the community.

The area of Yinnar South has a variety of sporting and recreation groups including a tennis club and a pony club. Yinnar South Tennis Club was established in 1927. It makes use of the two Albert Deppeler Memorial Tennis Courts in Yinnar South.

The Yinnar South Newsletter is a non-profit newsletter produced for the benefit of the residents of Yinnar South and district. It was first published in 1980 and is released monthly. Copies of the newsletter are distributed to local households while around fifty copies are available from the Yinnar General Store.
