= Strzelecki Highway =

Strzelecki Highway Victoria
- Coordinates: 38.475915°S 145.946751°E (Southwest end); 38.233172°S 146.379353°E (Northeast end)

General information
- Type: Highway
- Length: 55.7 km (35 mi)
- Gazetted: November 1913 (as Main Road); December 1990 (as State Highway)
- Route number(s): B460 (1998–present)
- Former route number: State Route 182 (1990–1998)

Major junctions
- Southwest end: Bass Highway; Leongatha, Victoria
- South Gippsland Highway; Grand Ridge Road; Princes Freeway
- Northeast end: Commercial Road; Morwell, Victoria

Location(s)
- Major settlements: Mirboo North

Highway system
- Highways in Australia; National Highway • Freeways in Australia; Highways in Victoria

Strzelecki Highway is a short 55 kilometre highway that connects the towns of Leongatha and Morwell in the western Gippsland region of Victoria. It was named after the Strzelecki Ranges, the set of low mountain ridges the road travels through.

== Route ==
Strzelecki Highway commences at the intersection with South Gippsland Highway and Bass Highway in Leongatha, Victoria and heads in a north-easterly direction as a two-lane, single carriageway road, winding with gentle curves through the Strzelecki Ranges to form the main street through the town of Mirboo North, and linking both sections of Grand Ridge Road through the town. It continues north-east, tracing west around the Hazelwood Power Station open-cut coal mine, to eventually terminate at the interchange with Princes Freeway on the western outskirts of Morwell.

== History ==
The passing of the Country Roads Act 1912 through the Parliament of Victoria provided for the establishment of the Country Roads Board (later VicRoads) and their ability to declare Main Roads, taking responsibility for the management, construction and care of the state's major roads from local municipalities. Leongatha-Yarragon Road from Leongatha via Hallston and Allambee to Yarragon, was declared a Main Road on 10 November 1913, and Leongatha-Mirboo Road was declared a Main Road on 16 February 1925. The passing of the Country Roads Act 1958 updated the definition of Main Roads. Mountain Hut Road was declared a Main Road on 9 May 1983, from the intersection with Mirboo North-Thorpdale Road in Delburn to the intersection with Morwell-Thorpdale Road in Driffield.

The passing of the Transport Act 1983 (itself an evolution from the original Highways and Vehicles Act 1924) provided for the declaration of State Highways, roads two-thirds financed by the State government through the Country Roads Board. Strzelecki Highway was declared a State Highway in December 1990, from Leongatha to Morwell, subsuming the original declarations of Mountain Hut and Leongatha-Mirboo Roads, and Leongatha-Yarragon Road between Leongatha and Leongatha North, as Main Roads; before this declaration, the road was also referred to as Morwell-Thorpdale Road.

Strzelecki Highway was signed as State Route 182 between Leongatha and Morwell in 1990; with Victoria's conversion to the newer alphanumeric system in the late 1990s, it was replaced by route B460.

The passing of the Road Management Act 2004 granted the responsibility of overall management and development of Victoria's major arterial roads to VicRoads: in 2008, VicRoads re-declared the road as Strzelecki Highway (Arterial #6180) between South Gippsland Highway in Leongatha and Commercial Road at Morwell.

The Morwell end of the highway was deviated westwards in 2006 as part of the Hazelwood Power Station West Field open cut mine expansion.

== Major intersections ==
LGA	Location	km	mi	Destinations	Notes
South Gippsland	Leongatha	0.0	0.0	Bass Highway (B460) – Inverloch, Phillip Island	South-western terminus of highway, route B460 continues south-west along Bass Highway
South Gippsland	Leongatha	0.0	0.0	South Gippsland Highway (A440) – Korumburra, Yarram	
South Gippsland	Mirboo North	22.3	13.9	Grand Ridge Road (west) – Warragul	
South Gippsland	Mirboo North	25.0	15.5	Meeniyan–Mirboo North Road (C455) – Dumbalk, Meeniyan	
South Gippsland	Mirboo North	25.5	15.8	Boolarra South–Mirboo North Road (C456) – Boolarra, Churchill to Grand Ridge Road (east) – Carrajung, Gormandale	
South Gippsland	Delburn	33.5	20.8	Mirboo North–Trafalgar Road (C469) – Thorpdale, Trafalgar	
Latrobe	Driffield	47.2	29.3	Morwell–Thorpdale Road (C464) – Thorpdale	
Latrobe	Morwell	55.7	34.6	Princes Freeway (M1) – Melbourne, Warragul, Traralgon, Sale	
Latrobe	Morwell	55.7	34.6	Commercial Road (Morwell–Thorpdale Road) (B460) – Morwell	North-eastern terminus oh highway, route B460 continues along Commercial Road to Morwell
1.000 mi = 1.609 km; 1.000 km = 0.621 mi: Route transition

== See also ==
- Highways in Australia
- Highways in Victoria
