= Hyland Highway =

Highway in Victoria, Australia

Hyland Highway Victoria
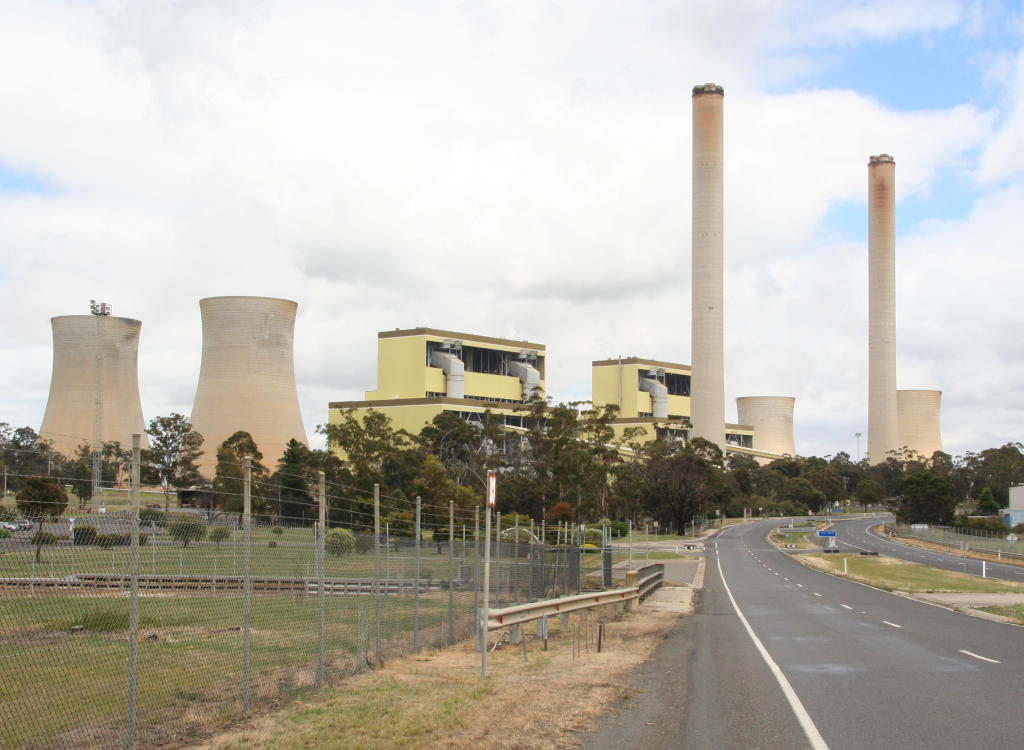
- View of the Loy Yang power station from Hyland Highway
- Coordinates: 38.199613°S 146.532999°E (North end); 38.546574°S 146.700790°E (South end)

General information
- Type: Highway
- Length: 59.9 km (37 mi)
- Gazetted: December 1913 (as Main Road); December 1990 (as State Highway)
- Route number(s): C482 (1998–present)
- Former route number: State Route 188 (1990–1998)

Major junctions
- North end: Princes Highway; Traralgon, Victoria
- Traralgon Creek Road; Grand Ridge Road; Carrajung–Woodside Road
- South end: South Gippsland Highway; Yarram, Victoria

Location(s)
- Major settlements: Gormandale

Highway system
- Highways in Australia; National Highway • Freeways in Australia; Highways in Victoria

Hyland Highway is a rural highway connecting the towns of Traralgon and Yarram in the Gippsland region of Victoria, Australia. It was named after Sir Herbert Hyland, a popular politician for the Country Party in the Gippsland area.

== Route ==
Highland Highway commences at the intersection of Princes Street and Breed Street in Traralgon and heading south as a two-lane, single carriageway road, nearly immediately crossing the Bairnsdale railway line just east of Morwell railway station, then heads east after a roundabout, then after another kilometre turns south to leave Traralgon's suburbs, curving around Loy Yang's open-cut coal mine, then heads south through Gormandale, through the eastern stretches of the Strzelecki Ranges, to eventually terminate at the intersection with South Gippsland Highway, just north-east of Yarram.

== History ==
The passing of the Country Roads Act 1912 through the Parliament of Victoria provided for the establishment of the Country Roads Board (later VicRoads) and their ability to declare Main Roads, taking responsibility for the management, construction and care of the state's major roads from local municipalities. Traralgon-Gormandale Road was declared a Main Road, from Traralgon to Flynns Creek on 1 December 1913, and from Flynns Creek to Gormandale on 23 March 1914. The road was later renamed Yarram-Traralgon Road and declared a Main Road by the Country Roads Board from at least 1955.

The construction of the open-cut coal mine for Loy Yang Power Station in the late 1970s required the road to be re-routed along Traralgon Creek Road (west of the coal mine) and Bartons Lane (south of the coal mine); the former alignment is now known as Craigburn Place (to the mine's north) and Broomfields Lane (to the mine's south-east).

The passing of the Transport Act 1983 (itself an evolution from the original Highways and Vehicles Act 1924) provided for the declaration of State Highways, roads two-thirds financed by the state government through the Road Construction Authority (later VicRoads). Hyland Highway was declared a State Highway in December 1990, from Traralgon to Yarram; before this declaration, the road was referred to as Traralgon Creek Road and Yarram-Traralgon Road.

Hyland Highway was signed as State Route 188 between Traralgon and Yarram in 1990; with Victoria's conversion to the newer alphanumeric system in the late 1990s, it was replaced by route C482.

The passing of the Road Management Act 2004 granted the responsibility of overall management and development of Victoria's major arterial roads to VicRoads: in 2004, VicRoads re-declared the road as Hyland Highway (Arterial #6170), beginning at Princes Highway at Traralgon and ending at South Gippsland Highway in Yarram.

== Major intersections ==
LGA	Location	km	mi	Destinations	Notes
Latrobe	Traralgon	0.0	0.0	Princes Highway (M1 east, west) – Sale, Bairnsdale, Warragul, Melbourne; Breed Street (north) – Traralgon	Northern terminus of highway and route C482 at traffic lights
Latrobe	Traralgon	0.1	0.062	Bairnsdale railway line	
Latrobe	Traralgon	0.2	0.12	Bank Street (C476) – Churchill, Boolarra	Roundabout
Latrobe	Loy Yang–Traralgon South boundary	6.6	4.1	Mattingley Hill Road (C475) – Morwell, Churchill, Boolarra	
Latrobe	Loy Yang–Traralgon South boundary	6.9	4.3	Traralgon Creek Road (C483) – Callignee	
Wellington	Willung South	31.6	19.6	Grand Ridge Road (C484) – Carrajung, Mirboo North	
Wellington	Carrajung Lower	39.1	24.3	Carrajung–Woodside Road (C453) – Woodside, Woodside Beach	
Wellington	Yarram	59.9	37.2	South Gippsland Highway (A440) – Sale, Foster, Leongatha, Lang Lang	Southern terminus of highway and route C482
1.000 mi = 1.609 km; 1.000 km = 0.621 mi: Route transition

== See also ==
- Highways in Australia
- Highways in Victoria
