= Grand Ridge Road =

Road in Victoria, Australia

Grand Ridge Road Victoria
- Coordinates: 38.297726°S 145.900143°E (West end); 38.349423°S 146.714494°E (East end)

General information
- Type: Rural road
- Length: 132.2 km (82 mi)
- Gazetted: November 1913 (as Main Road); 1924/25 (as "Ridge Road")
- Route number(s): C457 (1998-present) (Mirboo North-Mirboo); C458 (1998-present) (Mirboo-Boolarra South); C484 (1998-present) (Balook-Willung South)
- Former route number: State Route 190 (1986-1998) (Wonyip-Albert River)
- Tourist routes: Tourist Route 93 Entire route; Tourist Route 94 (Balook-Willung South); Tourist Route 95 (Wonyip-Tarra Valley)

Major junctions
- West end: Korumburra-Warragul Road; Seaview, Victoria
- Strzelecki Highway
- East end: Hyland Highway; Willung South, Victoria

Location(s)
- Major settlements: Mirboo North

(The) Grand Ridge Road is a long tourist drive through Gippsland, in Victoria, Australia. As the name suggests, the road primarily follows ridgelines through the heavily undulating Strzelecki Ranges.

The road is known for the attractive scenery ranging from open farmland to dense forest, especially as it passes through Mount Worth State Park and Tarra Bulga National Park. Its surface ranges from good quality sealed bitumen to heavily corrugated unsealed gravel.

== Route ==
Grand Ridge Road begins at the intersection Korumburra-Warragul Road in Seaview and runs in an easterly direction as a narrow dual-lane, single-carriageway sealed road via Allembee South to eventually meet Strzelecki Highway at Mirboo North, where the road quality improves as a dual-lane single-carriageway rural highway. It continues east as a narrow sealed road just beyond Mirboo, where the road quality degrades further into a single-lane dirt and gravel mountain road as it winds through the eastern Strzelecki Ranges; many sections are quite steep and passing opportunities are usually possible only at road junctions. The road quality improves to a narrow dual-lane sealed road where it meets Tarra Valley Road, and continues east as a sealed road until its eastern terminus at the intersection with Hyland Highway in Willung South.

The unsealed section of the road is heavily used by logging trucks throughout the year. Large trees and branches often fall after high winds. This road is not recommended for caravans.

== History ==
The passing of the Country Roads Act 1912 through the Parliament of Victoria provided for the establishment of the Country Roads Board (later VicRoads) and their ability to declare Main Roads, taking responsibility for the management, construction and care of the state's major roads from local municipalities. Leongatha-Yarragon Road from Leongatha North via Hallston and Allambee to Yarragon, and Warragul-Leongatha Road from Ellinbank via Seaview to Hallston, were declared Main Roads, on 10 November 1913; Boolarra-Welshpool Road from Boolarra via Wonyip to Welshpool, Jeeralang West Road from Wonyip via Grand Ridge, Jeeralang and Hazelwood to Morwell, Balook-Traralgon Road from Devon North via Balook to Traralgon, and Carrajung-Gormandale Road from Yarram via Calrossie and Balook to Carrajung, were declared Main Roads on 1 December 1913.

The passing of the Developmental Roads Act 1918 through the Parliament of Victoria provided for the declaration of Developmental Roads, roads which would serve to develop any area of land by providing access to a railway station for primary producers. Boolarra South-Mirboo Road was declared a Developmental Road on 11 April 1919, and The Ridge Road, from the intersection with Jeeralang West Road north of Grand Ridge to the intersection with Yarram-Balook Road west of Balook, was declared a Developmental Road on 2 July 1919.

Construction of (The) Ridge Road was detailed in the Country Roads Board's annual review for the 1924/25 financial year, referencing a longer route running from Seaview, Mirboo, Gunyah, Ryton, through Balook, Blackwarry to Carrajung (for a total of 66 miles, subsuming the original declarations of Warragul-Leongatha Road between Seaview and Hallston, Leongatha-Yarragon Road through Hallston, Boolarra-Welshpool Road between Boolarra South and Wonyip, Jeeralang West Road between Wonyip and Grand Ridge, Balook-Traralgon Road through Balook, and Carrajung-Gormandale Road from Balook to Carrajung, as Main Roads; and subsuming Boolarra South-Mirboo Road from Mirboo North to Boolarra South and Jeeralang West Road between Grand Ridge and Balook as a Developmental Road), described to "play an important part in the further development of the hill country of South Gippsland"; it was referred to as Grand Ridge Road from 1933.

A section of the road between Wonyip and Albert River was later declared as part of Midland Highway in 1939; this was later incorporated back into Grand Ridge Road when highway status was revoked in 1990.

Grand Ridge Road was signed as State Route 190 between Wonyip and Albert River (as part of the Midland Highway) in 1986; despite the revocation of the highway in 1990, this section was still signed as such until the change-over to the new alphanumeric system in the late 1990s, when all traces of the former route were removed. It is today signed as Tourist Route 93 for its entire route; its eastern section between Balook and Willung South is also signed Tourist Route 94 as part of the eastern loop of the Strzelecki Trail.

The passing of the Road Management Act 2004 granted the responsibility of overall management and development of Victoria's major arterial roads to VicRoads: in 2004, VicRoads re-declared the road as The Grand Ridge Road (Arterial #4023) between Tarra Valley Road in Balook and Hyland Highway at Willung South; the remaining section of Grand Ridge Road between Seaview and Balook remains undeclared.

== Significant intersections ==
LGA	Location	km	mi	Destinations	Notes
Baw Baw	Seaview	0.0	0.0	Korumburra–Warragul Road (C425) – Korumburra, Warragul	Western terminus of road and Tourist Drive 93
Baw Baw	Seaview	4.8	3.0	Warragul–Leongatha Road – Warragul	
Baw Baw	Seaview	8.3	5.2	McDonalds Track – Yarragon	
South Gippsland	Hallston	24.2	15.0	Leongatha–Yarragon Road – Leongatha	
South Gippsland	Allambee South	32.8	20.4	Mirboo–Yarragon Road – Yarragon	
South Gippsland	Mirboo North	39.1	24.3	Strzelecki Highway (B460 west) – Leongatha, Inverloch	Western terminus of concurrency with route B460
South Gippsland	Mirboo North	42.0	26.1	Meeniyan–Mirboo North Road (C455) – Dumbalk, Meeniyan	
South Gippsland	Mirboo North	42.5	26.4	Strzelecki Highway (B460 east) – Morwell	Eastern terminus of concurrency with route B460; Western terminus of route C456
South Gippsland	Mirboo North	42.6	26.5	Baromi Road (Boolarra–Mirboo North Road) (C456) – Boolarra	Route C456 continues east; western terminus of route C457
South Gippsland	Mirboo	56.6	35.2	Foster Road – Boolarra	Eastern terminus of route C457, route C458 continues south
South Gippsland	Mirboo	56.6	35.2	Olsens Road – Morwell River Falls Reserve	Eastern terminus route C458
South Gippsland	Gunyah	69.8	43.4	Boolarra–Foster Road – Foster	
Wellington	Wonyip	81.0	50.3	Woorarra Road – Welshpool	
Wellington	Wonyip	85.4	53.1	Albert River Road – Alberton West	
Wellington	Balook	109.0	67.7	Tarra Valley Road (C484) – Yarram	Route C484 and Tourist Route 94 continues south
Wellington	Balook	114.8	71.3	Traralgon–Balook Road (C483) – Traralgon	Tourist Route 94 continues north and east
Wellington	Willung South	132.2	82.1	Hyland Highway (C482) – Traralgon, Yarram	Eastern terminus of road, route C484 and Tourist Route 93; Tourist Route 94 continues north
1.000 mi = 1.609 km; 1.000 km = 0.621 mi: Concurrency terminus; Route transition

== Sources ==
- http://206gti.net/grr/
- http://gippsland.com/Directory/Trails/GrandRidgeRoad.asp
