= Mirboo North =

Mirboo North Victoria
- Coordinates: 38°24′S 146°09′E
- Population: 2,263 (2021 census)
  - Density: 23.451/km^{2} (60.74/sq mi)
- Postcode(s): 3871
- Elevation: 245 m (804 ft)
- Area: 96.5 km^{2} (37.3 sq mi)
- Location: 155 km (96 mi) SE of Melbourne; 35 km (22 mi) SW of Morwell; 25 km (16 mi) NE of Leongatha
- LGA(s): South Gippsland Shire
- County: Buln Buln
- State electorate(s): Gippsland South
- Federal division(s): Monash
Localities around Mirboo North:
Yarragon	Thorpdale	Yinnar
Korumburra	Mirboo North	Boolarra
Leongatha	Foster	Mirboo

Mirboo North is a town in Victoria, Australia, located 155 kilometres (96 mi) east of Melbourne, with a population of 2,263. It is in the South Gippsland Shire local government area.

The town is at the start of the Grand Ridge Rail Trail, which travels for 13 km through temperate rainforest and dry sclerophyll forest in the Strzelecki Ranges.

== History ==
The Mirboo area was settled by timber getters in the late 1870s, attracted particularly by the mountain ash. The original railway branch line from Morwell to Mirboo North was completed on 7 January 1886, with the last train being run on 22 June 1974. The railway was constructed through difficult hilly terrain requiring construction of massive embankments and numerous bridges. The convoluted history of the Post Office below demonstrates the attempts to form a viable Mirboo township, culminating in the township of Mirboo North at the railway station becoming predominant.

- 8/1/1879 Mirboo (1) opened
- 22/11/1879 Tarwin (1) opened
- 6/4/1881 Mirboo North (1) renamed from Mirboo, Mirboo (2) renamed from Tarwin
- 29/6/1885 Mirboo South (1) renamed from Mirboo, Mirboo (3) opened
- 1/4/1886 Baromi renamed from Mirboo North (closed 1892), Mirboo North (2) renamed from Mirboo (remains open), Mirboo (4) renamed from Mirboo South (closed 1972)
- 1/5/1888 Mirboo Central opened (closed 1895)
- c.1902 Russell's (Mirboo South) opened (closed c.1904)

Mirboo North became the focus of Victorian media on 10 August 2005, when about 15 cm of snow fell. The snow lay around for days.

== The Town today ==
Mirboo North is where the Grand Ridge Road, a scenic route running from Seaview (near Warragul) to Carrajung (near Traralgon) crosses the middle of the Strzelecki Highway between Leongatha and Morwell.

The town has two schools. Mirboo North Secondary College (~450 students) and Mirboo North Primary School.

The town has an Australian Rules football team competing in the Mid Gippsland Football League, a cricket team competing in the Latrobe Valley and District Cricket League and a soccer team (Mirboo North United Football Club) competing in the South Gippsland Soccer League.

Golfers play at the course of the Mirboo North Golf Club on Galvins Road. There is a market that runs beside the main st. It is run on the last Saturday of every month and starts at 8:30 am and runs until 12:30 pm.

The town also plays host to an Italian Festa that draws in large crowds with up to 25,000 people attending over the course of the day.

== Notable people and animals ==
- Tim Forsyth (High Jumper, Silver medallist at the 1992 Olympic Games)
- Belinda Snell (professional basketball player), currently competing in the WNBA for the Phoenix Mercury and a member of the Australian team that won silver at the Beijing Olympics in 2008.
- Sam the Koala found in the forests of Mirboo North, Victoria
