= Mirboo North Secondary College =

Location
- Castle St; Mirboo North, Victoria, 3871; Australia; 38.4008°S 146.1488°E

Information
- Type: State, co-ed, secondary
- Motto: Strive to Serve
- Principal: Karen Lanyon
- Enrolment: 360

Mirboo North Secondary College is a secondary college located in Mirboo North, Victoria, Australia. It has a small number of students numbering approximately 369.

== See also ==
- List of high schools in Victoria
