= Sam (koala) =

Koala rescued from a bushfire

- Sam on the cover of the Bushfire Aid CD
- Species: Koala
- Sex: Female
- Born: 2005–2007; Victoria, Australia
- Died: 6 August 2009 (aged 1–4); Morwell, Victoria, Australia
- Known for: Backburning survivor, subsequently linked to Black Saturday bushfires
- Sam the Koala

Sam (2005–2007 – 6 August 2009), also known as Sam the Koala, was a female koala from the forests of Mirboo North, Victoria, Australia. She became publicly known when a video and photographs of her being rescued by a firefighter were distributed on the internet and through the media during the aftermath of the Black Saturday bushfires.

== Initial encounter ==
A mobile phone video of the event, which attracted just over 1.4 million views on YouTube, shows firefighter David Tree approaching Sam who initially attempts to flee but then stops—Tree later speculated that the koala had been thinking "I can't run, I'm weak and sore, put me out of my misery"—and Tree calls for water. Sam is then shown drinking from a bottle he is holding for her. She is also seen allowing herself to be patted, and holding her paw on his hand. Sam became a symbol of hope. It was initially thought that Sam had been rescued by Tree following the February 2009 Victorian bushfires; however, the event actually occurred in the week before the worst of the fires, during backburning operations. Tree and his crew came across Sam when they were blacking out (making sure that a contained or checked fire does not restart) after the fires had gone through. The video was recorded by Tree and other firefighters; it had been intended for Tree's daughter.

== Treatment ==
Sam was subsequently taken to the Southern Ash Wildlife Centre in Rawson where she was found to be suffering from second-degree burns to her paws and given painkillers. Caretakers at the shelter expected that it would take her about eight months to recover. Based on the condition of her teeth, the shelter manager estimated her to be between two and four years old. She was placed with a male koala named Bob, who had been rescued from another of the bushfire areas two days earlier and was suffering from third-degree burns.

== Subsequent events ==
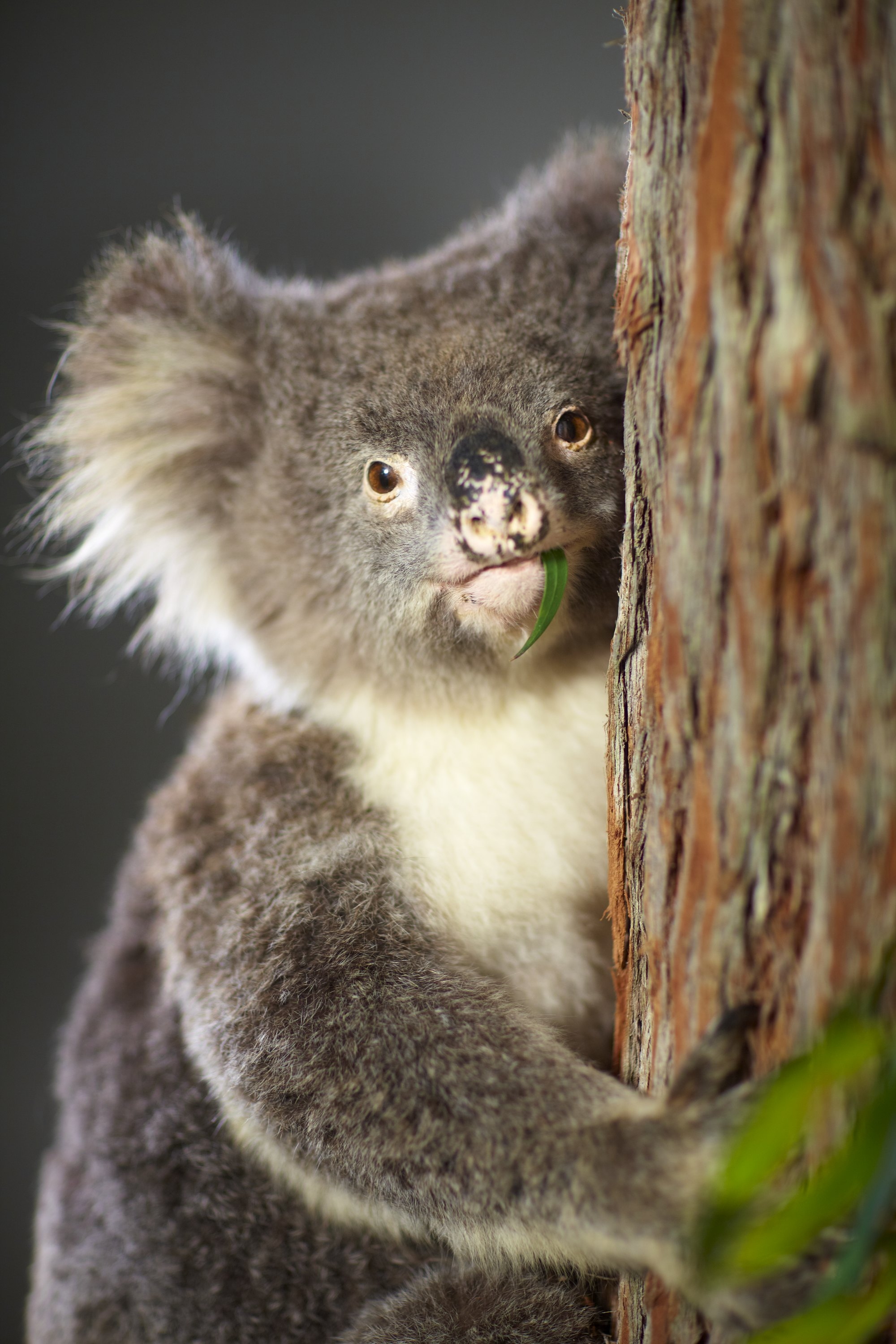
Sam's remains exhibited at Melbourne Museum

Sam's story was featured in media outlets worldwide, including The New York Times and CNN. Gossip site TMZ.com mocked the rescue, calling Sam "pampered"; this drew significant reader backlash and attention. TMZ later apologised to Sam.

Sam was euthanized on 6 August 2009. The decision was made after exploratory surgery on her urinary bladder and uterus to evaluate the possible removal of cysts caused by urogenital chlamydiosis. As her condition was inoperable the veterinarian stated that the decision was made to euthanise to prevent her suffering. Sam's remains were moved to Melbourne Museum where they were preserved as a symbol of the bushfires.

The Giant Koala (one of Australia's big things) was renamed Sam to raise awareness of koalas.

== Related products ==
An image of Sam with David Tree was used as cover art on a fundraising CD, Bushfire Aid, to which 35 national and international artists donated songs. All proceeds were donated to the Salvation Army Bushfire Appeal. A total of A$300,000 was also raised for the Country Fire Authority and other charities through selling photographs of Sam's rescue.

== Trademark dispute ==
On 20 February 2009 and 13 March 2009, an application was made to register the words "Sam the Koala" as a trademark in Class 30 (for chocolates) and as a trademark in Class 16 (for colouring-in books). The applications were approved for Acceptance of Registration of a Trademark on 25 June 2009 and 16 July 2009 respectively. An opposition notice was lodged by the Victorian state Department of Sustainability and Environment (DSE) in September 2009 and that opposition outcome is still pending a final decision by IPAustralia. The media published the trademark applications which led to a dispute called an 'Opposition Notice'.

On 27 July 2010 the DSE applied for a new trademark TM1374402, Sam The Koala, in Class 32 (beverages), Class 33 (alcoholic beverages), Class 41 (education, training and cultural activities), Class 43 (services for providing food and drink), and Class 44 (veterinary services and hygienic and beauty care for animals); however, DSE Application TM1374402 was issued an "Adverse Report1" on 27 August 2010.
