= Victorian Plantations Corporation =

The Victorian Plantations Corporation (VPC) of Victoria, Australia, was established under the State Owned Enterprises Act 1992 in May 1993, and by June 1993 was declared a State Business Corporation.

The corporation's functions and powers for the management of softwood and hardwood plantations were previously owned by the Victorian Government, and managed through the Forests Commission Victoria. The objective for establishing the Victorian Plantations Corporation was to create a statutory body to manage timber plantations:

- to establish, maintain and manage timber plantations on land vested in or managed by the corporation,
- to enter into, administer or manage agreements or licences relating to forest produce on land vested in or managed by the corporation.

The VPC was later sold in 1998 to American based superannuation company Hancock Timber Resource Group for $550 million to become Hancock Victorian Plantations (HVP)

== Victorian plantations history ==
There are very few native softwoods in Victoria, and those that do exist, like white cypress pine (Callitris glaucophylla), grow too slowly to be suitable for large scale commercial plantations.

From its earliest days in the 1830s, Victoria imported large quantities of softwoods, mostly from north America and Scandinavia. The need for cheaper and more reliable local sources for internal work, furniture and joinery was apparent.

Early foresters quickly discovered that the physical properties of native forest hardwoods were unsuitable for some applications and plantation-grown softwoods offered the chance to replace expensive imports of Baltic Pine, Oregon and other timbers with domestic supplies.

Pinus insignis (now called Pinus radiata), which is native to the central coast of California and Mexico, was first planted in gardens and windbreaks at Doncaster during the 1860s and grew well. It was sufficiently promising for commercial plantings to begin from 1887.

Initially, the planting goals were simply to rehabilitate land cleared during the gold rush, provide some timber and avoid the costs and unreliability of imported timber, generate some revenue and create jobs in local sawmills.

Experimental pine plantations were established under the stewardship of John Johnstone, the Victorian Superintendent of Plantations. These were at Frankston and Harcourt (1909), Wilsons Promontory (1910), Bright (1916), Port Campbell/Waarre (1919), Anglesea (1923) and Mount Difficult (1925). The largest plot was some 2,500 acres associated with the new McLeod Prison farm on French Island (1911). However, nearly all these plantings failed due to poor soil and site conditions, but valuable silvicultural lessons were learned. The earlier success of radiata pine had partly given rise to the fallacy that it could grow anywhere.

Planting activity once picked up again by the Forests Commission Victoria (FCV) in the 1930s with unemployment relief schemes during the Great Depression Commercial financial returns became a more important objective following increased investment with the plantations expansion program.

The war years saw activity again fall away sharply, but afterwards there was a renewed focus on developing native forests in eastern Victoria owing to the conclusion of the 1939 fire salvage and to provide timber for post-war housing construction. The Strzelecki Ranges reforestation program got underway in the 1930s with planting of both softwoods and hardwoods on abandoned farmland.

In 1949 the Commonwealth Forestry and Timber Bureau proposed a national planting program to make Australia more self-reliant in timber products after the shortages experienced during the war.

A new Ministerial Australian Forestry Council was formed in 1964 with one of its first decisions being to further raise the national softwood target, with the Commonwealth agreeing to provide loan monies to the states to plant 30,000 hectares of softwoods per year for 35 years. Victoria took up the challenge by establishing and maintaining its plantations at nearly half the average cost of the other States.

APM Forests (APMF) was formed in 1951 with the primary aim of supplying pulpwood to the Maryvale Mill in the LaTrobe Valley through the establishment of plantations and co-ordination of harvesting and transport. The company also invested heavily in plantations in the Strzelecki’s under the stewardship of Norwegian forester Bjarn Dahl.

The big leap for Victoria came in 1961, when the Chairman of the Forests Commission, Alf Lawrence, attended the World Forestry Conference in São Paulo Brazil, and upon his return took a bold decision to commit to a massive plantation expansion program which initiated nearly four decades of plantation establishment.

The commission decision created a new wave of momentum and private investment optimism. The plantation area eventually reached a threshold where manufacturers could confidently establish major processing plants. As the government and private plantation base progressively expanded and matured, agreements were reached with private mills such as Bowater-Scott (now Carter Holt Harvey) at Myrtleford in 1972, and the Australian Newsprint Mills at Albury in 1980.

Planting peaked in 1969 with a record 5,183 ha and by the end of 1982, the Forests Commission Victoria had established 87,000 hectares of softwood plantations, a five-fold increase since 1940.

Softwood plantation zones were concentrated around Bright and Myrtleford in the Ovens Valley, Portland-Rennick, Latrobe Valley-Strzelecki Ranges, Ballarat-Creswick, Benalla-Mansfield, Upper Murray near Tallangatta-Koetong, the Otways and Central zone near Taggerty.

The majority of Victoria's plantation estate had been traditionally managed by the FCV and had grown to become a major supplier of wood to industry as the plantations expanded and matured. This was done mostly on the basis of legislated, long-term wood supply contracts to ensure stable marketing and support of the industry.

Throughout the 1970s and '80s, political and social attitudes to commercial forestry changed significantly, and the new Cain State Labor Government which was elected in 1982 took a very different approach from past State Governments towards forestry, and indeed other Government owned assets. Government Departments' were amalgamated and the management of State assets questioned at a number of levels. Crown Land that had traditionally been used by Government for a range of services was sometimes viewed as "surplus" and sold to raise funds. The State's (mostly) softwood plantations were also viewed as a potential for sale and so in 1990, a process of separation was begun.

The Victorian Timber Industry Strategy (TIS) in 1986 set new government policies for the industry and management of public forests and plantations. In 1987, the State Government introduced a policy to stop clearing of native forest for softwood plantations.

== Start of the separation - 1990 ==
In late 1990, the government was given advice that, if sold, the plantations could raise a significant amount of money – probably in the hundreds of millions. A number of models were evaluated and, in early 1991, CS First Boston was engaged to assess the sale possibility and identify the elements required. They concluded that a sale was possible, but that there were some significant impediments that would need to be overcome. These included but were not limited to, no commercial structure, non-assignable wood supply agreements, land tenure, employment and environmental issues, Federal loan issues etc. They indicated a possible return of around $160 million and recommended a Competitive Tender/Negotiated sale from a number of other options which included Corporatisation as an initial step.

Other comprehensive legal advice was sought regarding contract issues etc., and the government decided not to sell at this stage, but to explore other options. By early 1992 a number of the recognised impediments had been evaluated and possibilities including joint ventures, separation within the department and corporatisation were considered and a recommendation to Cabinet to corporatise was agreed in July 1992. This was virtually the last Kirner Labor Cabinet meeting prior to the state election and in September 1992 the new incoming Kennett Liberal Government, in accordance with their previously enunciated forest policy, directed that work commence immediately to have a separate Corporation in place by 30 June 1993. A project team was immediately established to work through many of the issues identified in the preceding 18 months. These included: valuation and finance, land and survey, management structures, workforce and industrial relations, legislation, fire protection and many other issues. Each of these had interesting challenges and the major solutions included:

- Legislation – a new act to establish the Victorian Plantations Corporation (VPC), the Victorian Plantations Corporation Act 1993 (No. 61 of 1993), was passed on the last sitting day of autumn 1993. The main purpose was to transfer land and other assets, and the wood supply agreements to the VPC.
- Land – the land was vested in the VPC with huge debates over boundaries. The land ceased to be Reserved Forest, and became "Crown land" and was vested in the VPC, which was a state-owned enterprise. The vesting process and the creation of the title maps was the biggest cadastral survey job ever undertaken by the Surveyor Generals Department.
- Communication and working parties – a statewide program was undertaken including all affected government staff.
- Management structures – in interim board was established .
- Workforce and industrial relations – new legislation under the State Owned Enterprises Act helped, but there were major issues with Unions, superannuation, staff transfers etc.
- Research and development – was contracted back to the Department of Conservation Forests and Lands (CFL)
- Fire protection – Because of the land status, the CFL still had a legal responsibility, but this was done with VPC added capacity. This changed later with the Country Fire Authority Industrial Brigades process.

== Victorian Plantations Corporation - 1993 ==
The Victorian Plantations Corporation (VPC) formally commenced as a state-owned enterprise on 1 July 1993 with three staff (Managing Director, Deputy MD, and Company Secretary), while plantation management remained under contract to the Department of Conservation Forests and Lands. Staffing continued until October, when the corporation assumed full control of the 106,250 ha softwood and 7,180 ha hardwood estate. A "top-down" approach was used: Zone Managers and senior staff were appointed first, followed by recruitment within their areas as needed.

Focused solely on plantation management, VPC established a field-oriented structure with four geographic Zones and a central office in Melbourne, free from legacy departmental constraints. Total staffing was reduced from over 300 to 115, with Zone structures tailored to local needs. Most staff were on individual contracts, though some field workers chose to operate under the Australian Workers' Union (AWU) award.

Over the next five years, VPC concentrated on optimising resources and building a commercially viable organisation for sale. The core strategy aimed to maximise value from the existing land base by:

- Bringing all unplanted land into production
- Replanting harvested areas within 18 months
- Converting suitable but unproductive sites
- Disposing of low-potential land
- Developing new markets through strategic customer alliances

In its first year, VPC reported revenue exceeding $30 million and a net operating profit before tax of $12 million. By June 1998, revenue had increased to $81 million and profit to $30.7 million. During the same period, the forest valuation rose from $202 to $317 million, and $68 million was returned to the State Government as dividends.

This commercial success was largely due to increased wood supply (from 1.15 to 1.96 million cubic metres), the conversion of all supply agreements to commercial contracts, and the development of new export markets. Cost control measures were introduced using industry-standard accounting systems, along with prudent reserves for natural disasters and contingencies.

The inventory and yield regulation system (FRIYR), inherited from the Department of Conservation Forests and Lands, was replaced with standard plantation industry systems. Fire protection was aligned with the Country Fire Authority as Industry Brigades. Land boundaries were legally defined through a three-year remote survey—the largest since Federation—resulting in certified plans.

Field operations were streamlined, with many tasks outsourced, and mill door delivery gradually increased to 35% of total sales, improving wood supply efficiency.

In March 1998, the government decided to privatise VPC, completing the sale later that year to Hancock Timber Resource Group for $550 million, forming Hancock Victorian Plantations (HVP). A fertiliser response model, developed using data from softwood plantations formerly managed by VPC, has since been used to improve predictions of productivity and economic returns in plantation forestry.

== Hancock Victorian Plantations - 1998 ==
The process that was begun in 1990 culminated in the sale of all the forest assets and harvesting rights, but not freehold title to the crown land estate, of the Victorian Plantations Corporation to Hancock Timber Resource Group in 1998.

The assets of the VPC including trees, nurseries, staff, supply contracts, etc, along with some areas of freehold land that had been purchased by VPC post 1993. There were also some areas leased for "once only harvest" and subsequent divestment/return to the Crown e.g.. Delatite Arm, Mt Alexander and parts of old Narbethong plantation.

The VPC still exists in a legal sense and is "owned" by the in the Dept of Treasury and Finance as the holder of the vested land and the licences.

Hancock Victorian Plantations (HVP) was a new, Australian-registered company. The capital came primarily from various Australian and US superannuation/pension funds. UniSuper was a major local shareholder at the time, as was the Chicago Police Dept pension fund. Initial ownership was I about 55% Australian. The deal was put together by US company Hancock Timber Resources Group

Hancock Victorian Plantations (HVP) commenced operation in late 1998 and the only major change in the first 12 months was the replacement of the VPC Board with the new HVP Board.

The VPC had run on a very different model from the usual Hancock experience under pension fund ownership, and the "normal" Hancock model of a management company was not initiated. After the first year of operation, the Board initiated a restructure in late 1999 and there have been many "fine tuning" iterations since.

HVP purchased the plantation assets previously owned by of Australian Paper Manufacturers Forests (APMF) in Gippsland in about 2000 to become one of Australia’s largest softwood companies supplying over 3 million tonnes of wood annually to local manufacturing industries.

Victoria now has 382,600 hectares of privately owned and managed plantations (which include HVP) making up nearly a quarter of the national total.

Victoria also produces around 25% of Australia’s plantation grown wood, while the industry generates an average of $500 million in value per year.
