= Meeniyan =

- Town
- Flag of Meeniyan

- Coordinates: 38°38′S 146°01′E
- Country: Australia
- State: Victoria
- LGA: South Gippsland Shire

Government
  - State electorate: Gippsland South
  - Federal division: Monash

Population
  - Total: 771 (2016 census)
- Postcode: 3956
- County: Buln Buln

Meeniyan is a small country town on the South Gippsland Highway between Leongatha and Foster in Australia. As of 2016 it has a population of 771.

== History ==
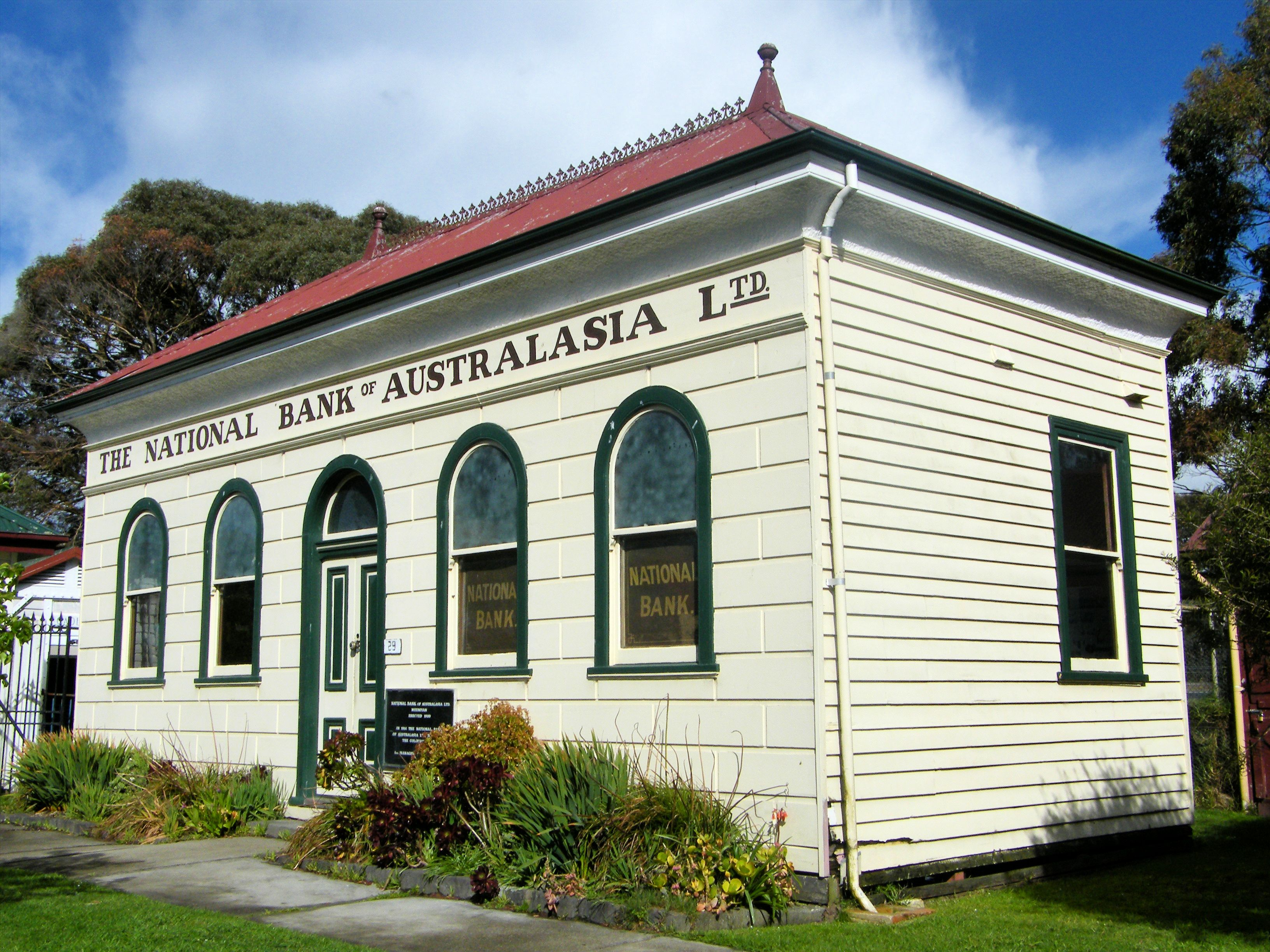
The former Meeniyan National Bank of Australasia, now located at Old Gippstown in Moe

The Post Office opened on 16 August 1890 shortly before the railway arrived.

The Meeniyan Magistrates' Court closed on 1 January 1983, not having been visited by a Magistrate since 1971.

== Meeniyan Today ==
Meeniyan is a small country town located on the South Gippsland Highway between Leongatha and Foster in Australia. It's known as the "turning point" because you can choose to travel along the highway, turning off at Meeniyan to explore Fish Creek, Wilsons Promontory and surrounds. The town is surrounded by the idyllic Strzelecki Ranges and has a variety of boutique stores and cafes. Meeniyan town centre is marked by a wide tree-lined median strip including the towns cenotaph.

The annual Meeniyan Garlic Festival brings excess of over seven thousand produce enthusiasts to town in mid February.

Meeniyan also offers several other activities and attractions. You can view an array of artwork at the Meeniyan Art Gallery, walk or ride the Great Southern Rail Trail, visit the Meeniyan Bird Hide via the walking/cycling path around the wetlands, and enjoy a day out at the Stony Creek Racing Club.

Music is a big part of local life in the Meeniyan Hall: Lyrebird Arts presents international touring artists and the Tavern talent nights are held every couple of months. Meeniyan is also now known for the filming of Bed of Roses a mini-series on ABC1.

Meeniyan Dumbalk United (MDU) Football Club is the local Australian Rules football team that competes in the Alberton Football League. The team is shared with neighbouring township Dumbalk. The Meeniyan Recreation Reserve is the MDU FC home ground.The town's golf course, the Meeniyan Golf Club is on Meeniyan-Promontory Rd, It is a 18-hole, par 71, 5779m volunteer run course, which consists of grass greens, natural bush and undulating fairways set alongside the Stony Creek.

== See also ==
- Meeniyan railway station
