= Strzelecki Ranges =

Mountain range in Victoria, Australia

- Tolone
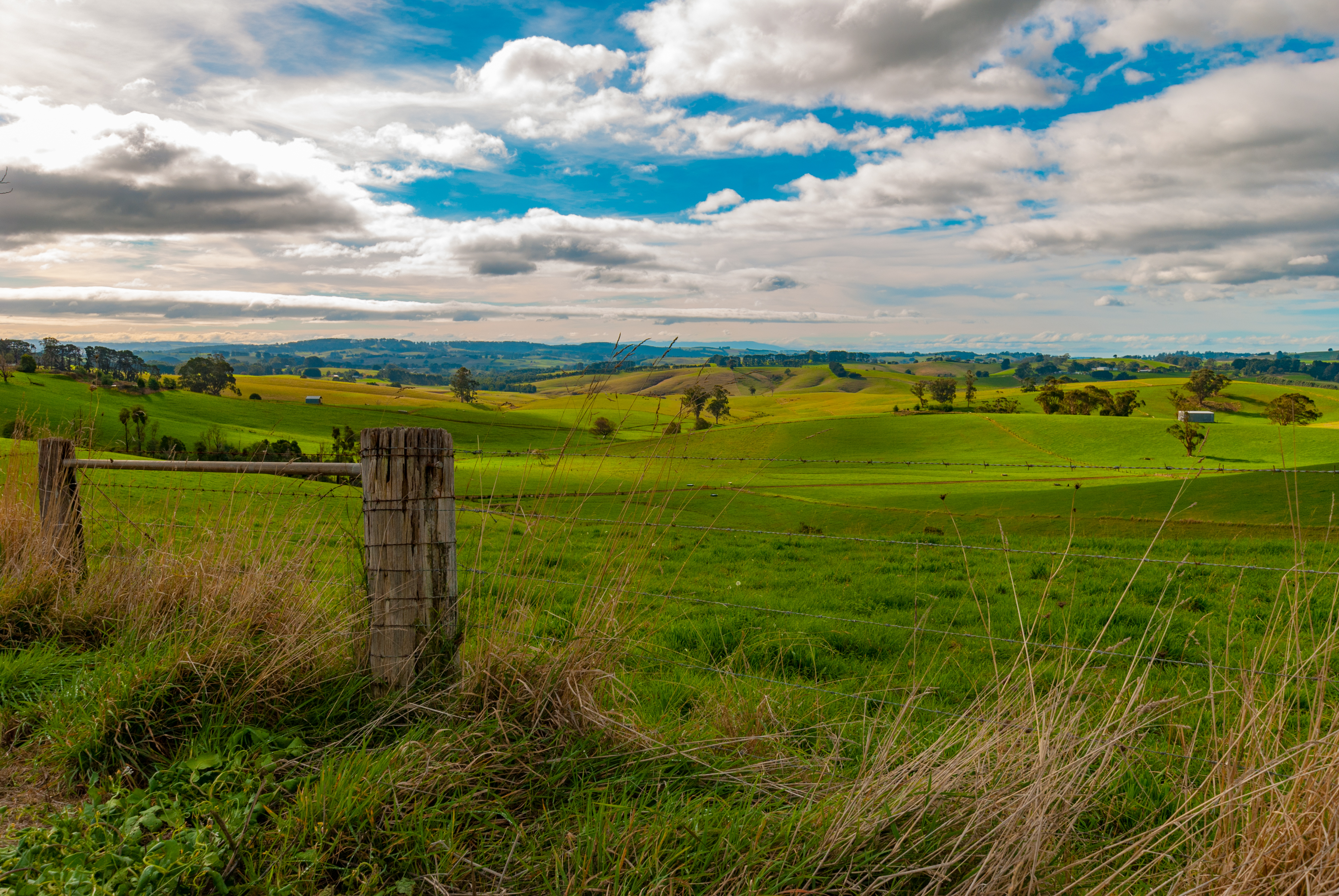
- View of the Strzelecki Ranges looking towards Mirboo North

Highest point
- Peak: Mount Tassie
- Elevation: 740 m (2,430 ft); AHD

Geography
- Location within Victoria
- Country: Australia
- Region: Victoria
- Range coordinates: 38°19′42″S 145°55′32″E

The Strzelecki Ranges (/strɛzˈlɛki/ strehz-LECK-ee; Polish pronunciation: [stʂɛˈlɛt͡skʲi]) is a range of low mountains located in the West Gippsland and South Gippsland regions of the Australian state of Victoria.

The Ranges are named after Paweł Edmund Strzelecki, a Polish explorer, who with the assistance of Charley Tarra, the small party's Aboriginal guide, led an expedition through this region in 1840.

They also form a biogeographic subregion of the South Eastern Highlands. "Land of the Lyrebird" is also a common alternative name for the Strzelecki Ranges based on a popular 1920s book.

== Geography ==
The Strzelecki Ranges generally run east-west and extend for roughly 100 km. They are composed of deeply dissected sandstone and mudstone, rising from 300 to 500 metres, with the highest point at Mount Tassie being 740 metres.

The north is bounded by the Latrobe River and the south by the coast dominated by Wilsons Promontory, Corner Inlet and the Ninety-Mile beach.

The Strzelecki Ranges presents a diverse range of landscapes that are difficult to simply categorise, but they are essentially in two parts: western and eastern.

The western ranges have been successfully cleared for agriculture and feature green rolling hills with small farms and settlements in the south like Korumburra, Foster, and Leongatha and towns like Yarragon, Trafalgar, Warragul, Morwell, and Traralgon in the north that extend along the Princes Highway.

The eastern Strzeleckis remain heavily forested with steep dissected ridges and valleys with high rainfall. The settlements that encircle the Ranges include Boolarra, Churchill, and Gormandale in the north and Toora and Yarram in the south, while the eastern boundary is marked by Won Wron and Willung South on the Gippsland Plain.

The township of Mirboo North sits between the two parts, straddling the main ridge. The average annual temperature in Mirboo North ranges between a cool 12.8 °C in winter and a temperate 26.6 °C in summer, with annual rainfall averaging 1040 mm.

The Strzelecki Ranges are so expansive they overlap five Local Government Areas. The western section primarily sits within Baw Baw, South Gippsland and Bass Coast shires while the eastern portion is mostly within the City of LaTrobe and Shire of Wellington.

Conservation reserves include Tarra-Bulga National Park, the Gunyah Rainforest Reserve, Morwell National Park and the Mt. Worth State Park. Agnes Falls at Toora cascades over a series of rocks on a 59-metre drop is a well known waterfall.

The Ranges are very similar in formation and appearance to the Otway Ranges southwest of Melbourne.

== Indigenous history ==
The eastern Strzelecki Ranges fall within the territory of the Gunai or Kurnai people and part of the western Ranges within the territory of the Bunurong nation. In the Aboriginal Boonwurrung language, the range is called Tolone. Stone axes, grinding stones and bush ovens provide evidence of Aboriginal use of the tall dense forests of the ranges. It is believed that Aboriginal people did not permanently occupy the wet forested mountain ranges because of uncertain food supplies and the harsh climate. During summer and spring short trips were common. The Ranges were a source of lyrebird tail feathers, which were used for ornamentation and for trade.

== European explorers ==
Before permanent European settlement, the coast to the south of the Strzeleckis was visited by sealers and wattle bark gatherers, but they did not settle. Samuel Anderson (1803–1863), a Scottish immigrant from Kirkcudbright, agriculturist and explorer, established a squatter agricultural settlement on the Bass River in 1835, the third permanent settlement in Victoria (then called the Port Phillip District).

The first European to explore the Strzelecki Ranges was Angus McMillan, who came in search of pastures from New South Wales in 1839.

However, the Strzelecki Ranges are named after the Polish explorer, Paweł Edmund Strzelecki (also known as Paul Edmund de Strzelecki). In 1840, after climbing and naming Australia's highest mountain Mount Kosciuszko, he journeyed further south into Gippsland. Heading towards Port Phillip Bay, his party entered the north-eastern end of the Strzelecki Ranges and struggled through the rugged and thick forest for 22 days, before finally emerging starved and exhausted at Corinella on Western Port Bay.

== Vegetation ==
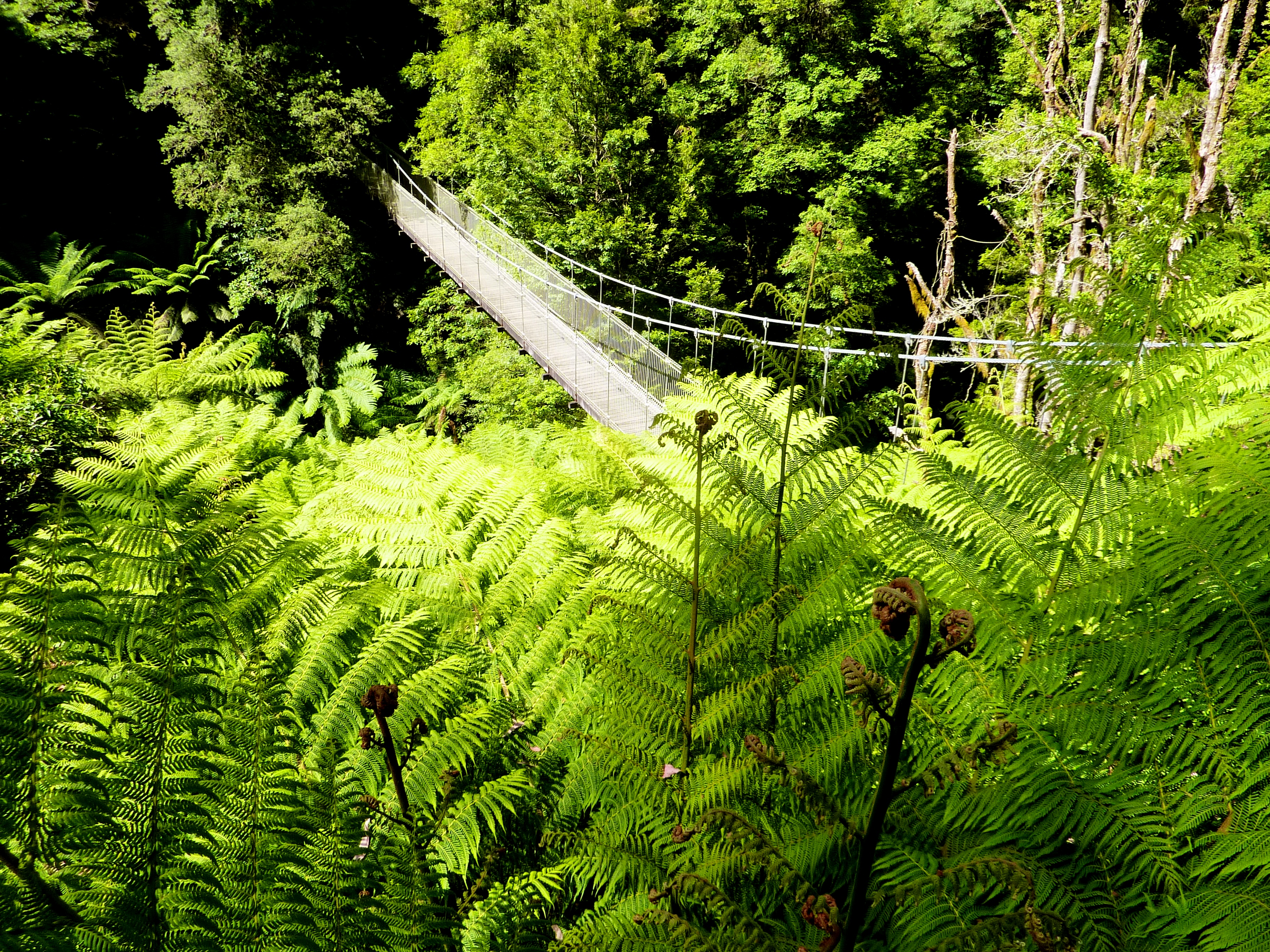
The Corrigan Suspension Bridge, Tarra-Bulga National Park

The eastern Ranges were originally covered by a mosaic of wet forest, dominated by 90-metre-tall mountain ash (Eucalyptus regnans) and cool temperate rainforest of myrtle beech and tree ferns. Drier mixed forest of messmate (Eucalyptus obliqua), peppermint (E. radiata) and mountain grey gum (E. cypellocarpa) were more common in the foothills of the western Strzeleckis.

In 1976, a monument was unveiled by the Hon Jim Balfour to the "World's Tallest Tree" near Thorpdale, which in 1881 was measured by a surveyor, George Cornthwaite, at 375 feet (114.3 metres) after it had been chopped down. This account was reported in the Victorian Field Naturalist many years later in July 1918 and is often considered the most reliable record of Victoria's tallest tree.

As a result of clearing for agriculture in the late 19th and early 20th centuries and of some logging activity, the native vegetation of the overall Strzelecki Ranges bioregion is highly depleted, with only 19% of its original extent remaining, mostly in the east.

Most of the remaining forest is in the eastern ranges, with the Tarra-Bulga National Park, Gunyah Rainforest Reserve, the Morwell National Park, Mount Worth State Park and the Mirboo North Regional Park set aside as formal conservation reserves. There are also significant areas of State Forest within the Hancock Victorian Plantations (HVP) estate, including the "Cores and Links".

Much of the land was degraded, covered with weeds and infested with rabbits after it was abandoned by the early settlers. During the reforestation and plantation establishment, considerable effort went into controlling weeds like blackberry and ragwort. While not able to fully eradicate these pests, the biodiversity of the eastern Ranges has slowly been restored as tree cover increases and the understorey recovers to smother some of the weeds.

== Early settlers ==
After McMillian and Strzelecki opened the way, it did not take long for settlements to develop along the river flats in the more favourable grazing lands of Gippsland.

In the same way that the Strzeleckis can be geographically described in two-halves, western and eastern, the early settlement of the land followed a similar pattern.

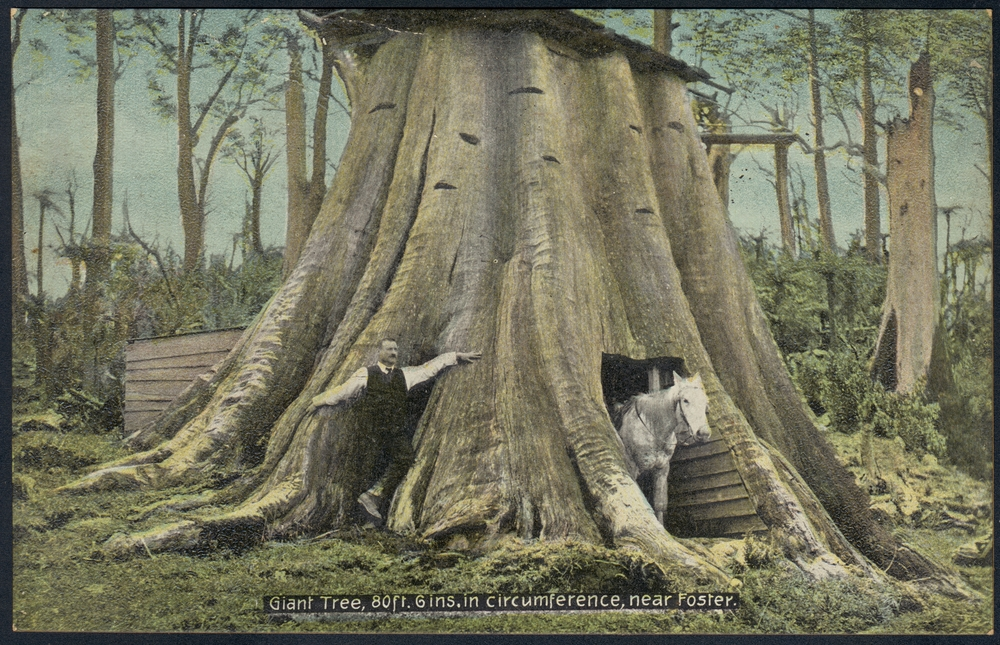
Giant tree near Foster Victoria, c. 1900–1909

The selection era began with the passing of a series of Land Acts in the 1860s, which by the end of that decade opened up almost the whole of Victoria for selection. By the mid-twentieth century, much of the land in the rolling hills of western Strzelecki Ranges had been taken up.

In west Gippsland near Warragul land settlement began from about 1862 while further south it was a bit later in 1870. People came from all points of the compass and spread out, with the final part being settled near the Tarwin Valley.

However, the dense forests and steep terrain of the eastern Strzeleckis initially discouraged attempts to open up the hill country until later. Then in the early 1880s, selectors began penetrating the forest, selecting land in Jumbuk, Boolarra, Budgeree and Callignee. The rainfall was higher in the densely forested Strzelecki Ranges, and it was wrongly assumed the land was fertile because of the giant trees that grew there. In the aftermath of the end of the Victorian gold rush there was a severe economic recession in the 1890s. Many Melbourne families believed the county offered a better life but with most of the easier grazing land in western Victoria and Gippsland already selected they moved into the remaining land in the eastern Strzeleckis. Ahead of them was the Herculean task of clearing the giant trees and of trying to get their produce to market.

Under various acts of the Victorian State Parliament, smaller farms were developed, and the land was aggressively cleared for more intensive use. While most of the western Strzeleckis was transformed into productive farms, attempts to select land in the higher eastern parts of the Ranges largely resulted in failure.

Clearing the vast forests took years of grueling labor. The original selections were limited to 130 hectares, but some held less. Using the usual axe, saw, and shovel on even 40 hectares was ineffective. Instead, the settlers partly cut through the trees as they worked up the side of the steep slopes. At the top, they would fell a large tree that, by its own weight, brought down all the trees below it. The scrub and trees would be left to dry and then were lit on a hot day in January or February. The success depended on getting a clean fall and a good burn. And if left unchecked, the scrub and weeds quickly reoccupied the cleared ground before pasture could be established.

The trees were huge, some with a girth of 18 metres and giant buttresses running up 6 metres or more. Some of the larger stumps were used as dwellings.

Big trees were central to the culture of the early settlers in the Strzeleckis. In 1927 a local identity and axeman, Jack Pattinson cut 45 springboards into a tree to a height of 160 feet. He was ambidextrous, so the springboards went straight up the tree rather than spiraled around as usual. For a dare, he put a local Gunyah Football Club 'Dingos' jumper at the top. Legend has it that he bet any man a month's wages to climb up and get the jumper down. No one ever did; so it just rotted away. But over time the Pattinson Tree came to represent a totem in the local community and its remnants can still be found on the Grand Ridge Road.

In addition to the discovery of gold at Walhalla in 1862, agriculture and forestry, the mining of large coal deposits in the LaTrobe Valley, at Wonthaggi as well as Gelliondale near Yarram from the 1920s strongly influenced the pattern of later settlement across Gippsland.

== The Heartbreak Hills ==
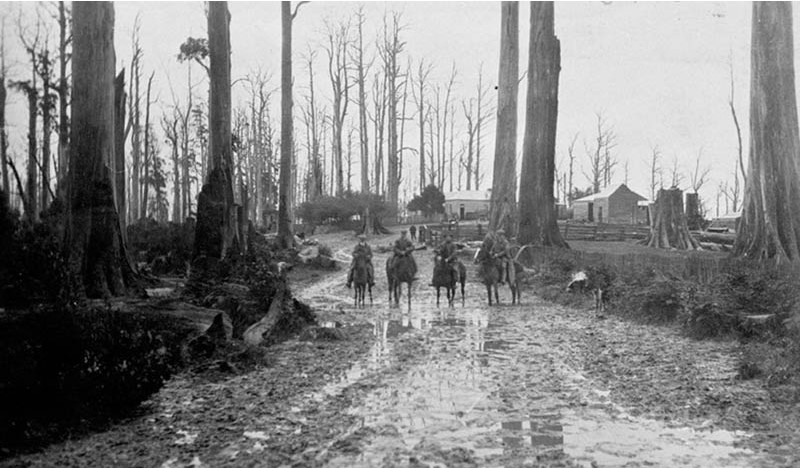
Grand Ridge Road – Members of the Country Roads Board (CRB) leaving Roger's Hotel at Gunyah 25 June 1913

By 1887, the Minister for Lands, John Lamont Dow, expressed regret that "the magnificent blue gum ridges throughout south Gippsland have been alienated from the Crown … every acre of this land has passed into the hands of private selectors."

But high rainfall, steep hills, the lack of an adequate road system, and long distances to markets, ultimately caused farming to fail in many of these areas, particularly in the eastern ranges.

In winter, the roads degenerated and became boggy channels of mud. Corduroy tracks were built with small logs laid cross ways along the worst stretches. The hill farmers believed that government investment in a major roads program would be their salvation. The Grand Ridge Road was built by the Country Roads Board in the 1920s, joining all the local north-south roads in one long east-west strip, but proved of little practical use. However, the road was progressively improved as a result of unemployment relief works during the Great Depression of the 1930s and was promoted as a tourist drive. The other hope was the timber industry but Melbourne's timber was adequately supplied from the Central Highlands until the mid-1950s.

Often, in the higher rainfall areas, once the forest had been removed, large chunks of the hillsides began to move and slump down the steep slopes, causing deep erosion scars that sometimes blocked streams and roads with tonnes of saturated topsoil and sticky clay.

Bushfires also swept through the eastern Strzeleckis, the worst being on Red Tuesday 1898 when 50 homesteads were destroyed. The fires are dramatically illustrated by the paintings "The homestead saved" by James Alfred Turner and "Gippsland, Sunday Night, February 20, 1898" by John Campbell Longstaff. Other bushfires followed between 1899 and 1944, but the Ranges largely escaped the Black Friday bushfires of 1939.

As understanding grew that the clearing of the eastern Strzeleckis had been a tragic mistake, a slow blight settled. After the First World War broke out, many young men left their farms to serve, leaving older people confronted with the reality and hardships of the land. Farms were ill-equipped and, when the soldiers returned, butterfat prices collapsed and never recovered. The steep hills were not suited to agricultural machinery and later came the Great Depression of the 1930s.

Over the next fifty years, farmers and their families progressively sold their land and moved on, or simply abandoned their properties and walked away. The scrub, blackberries, rabbits and weeds then took over, and the area became known locally as the Heartbreak Hills.

Today there are many place names on maps that are names only – all the homes are gone, leaving little trace.

== Forest industries ==
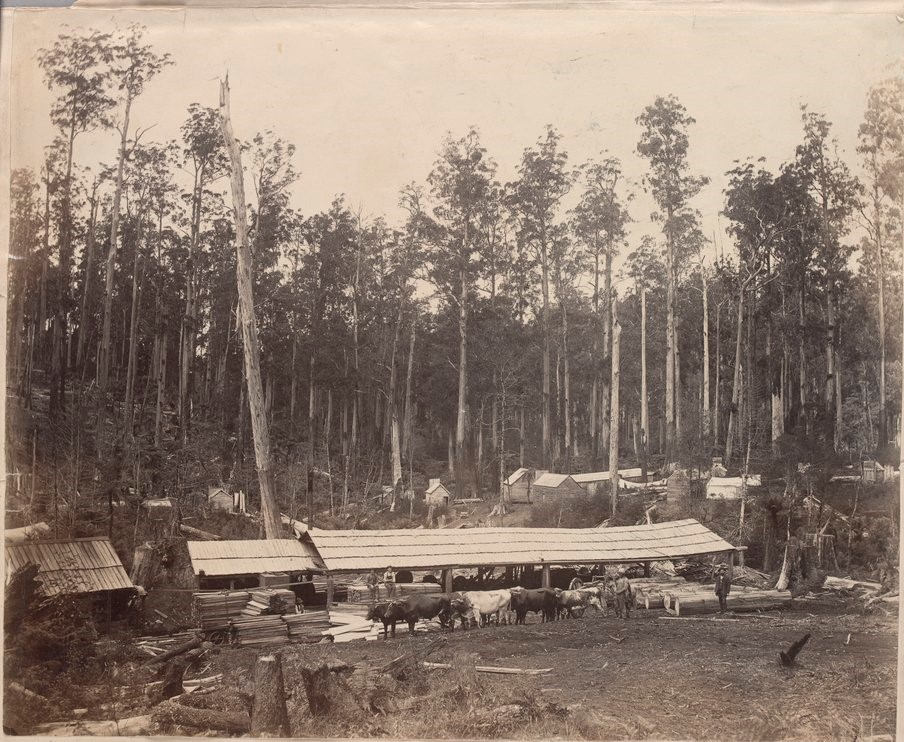
Sawmill at Childers (1886)

The early development of the timber industry was haphazard and it was not until the establishment of the Forests Commission of Victoria (FCV) in 1918 that a more coordinated approach to harvesting and management of forest resources was initiated.

The FCV played an important role in the development of the forest industry by providing infrastructure and capital to support activities such as sawmilling and, perhaps more importantly, developing long term strategies to manage and sustain Victoria's forest resources.

With selectors moving into the Strzeleckis and railway construction beginning in the hills, the timber industry developed. The railway line to Boolarra opened in 1885 and the line extended to Mirboo North in 1886. At Boolarra and Mirboo North several sawmills operated and paling splitting was also widespread. The palings and blackwood logs were transported out by rail. The sawmills operating at Darlimurla from the 1880s also produced significant numbers of sawn logs. Sawmilling was also an important industry at Yinnar.

The mills were located in the forest and tramways linked them to the railway station. Henry Collins set up his mill in Mill Road south-east of Yinnar around 1911 and built a tramline along Whitelaw's Track. Higher in the Strzeleckis, where mountain ash forests grew, settlers burnt the trees they had ringbarked and felled, although some were split for palings. During the 1920s, there were advances with kiln drying mountain ash and it became highly sought after as a building timber. Small sawmills such as the Duff sawmill operated in the higher part of the Strzeleckis until the timber became too difficult to extract.

== Reforestation and plantations ==
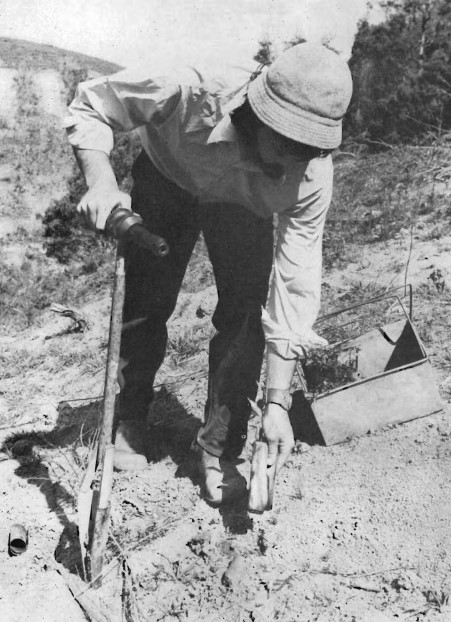
Most of the planting on the steep hills of the eastern Strzelecki Ranges was done by hand crews from the Forests Commission and from Morwell River Prison.

In what is believed to be the largest, most sustained and expansive reforestation project of its type in Australia the Forests Commission Victoria (FCV) began purchasing farming properties in the early 1930s, and increasingly through the 1940s and into the 1950s, reaching a peak between 1944 and 1951. However, it seemed not all the community was pleased about the acquisition of farmland. The project ran for over 60 years with fluctuations of investment but essentially ended with the creation of the Victorian Plantations Corporation in 1993.

Albert Lind was the Minister for Forests and local Member in Legislative Assembly for the seat of Gippsland East from 1920 to 1961 and was instrumental in advocating for State Government funding of the reforestation program. Around the same time, and with the support of Lind, the Forests Commission Chairman A.V. Galbraith and Sir Herbert Gepp from Australian Paper Manufacturers Ltd (APM) finalised a pioneering legislated agreement for pulpwood supply from State forests and from softwood plantations including the Strzeleckis. The company then proceeded to establish a plant at Maryvale in LaTrobe Valley for the manufacture of Kraft papers which came into production in October 1939.

Before the end of the Second World War, the Forests Commission began making additional plans to reforest and rehabilitate the Strzeleckis and establish a timber supply. It was joined in the venture by APM. The company announced the formation of a subsidiary company, APM Forests Ltd, in 1951 and planned an enormous reforestation scheme to supply softwood and hardwood pulp to the mill. They also began purchasing properties to establish plantations that would eventually supply the new mill.

Meanwhile, research indicated that the best softwood to plant in dryer areas was Pinus radiata and the best hardwood in the wet sites was mountain ash, Eucalyptus regnans and shining gum E. nitens.

One of the first initiatives was to establish softwood and hardwood plantations during the 1930s Depression, and considerable planting work was carried out as part of unemployment relief measures. At the same time, programs were developed to reforest previously cleared land in the Strzelecki Ranges that had been abandoned by failed settlement schemes.

This plantation program was expanded after the Second World War to meet the unprecedented demand for sawn timber that was a result of the severe housing shortage experienced at that time.

The Commission initially purchased derelict farmland at Allambee (1947–49), Childers (1946–48) and Halls Road at Boolarra (1949). The planting of trees had the major benefit of stabilising the highly erodible soils on the steep hillsides that had been cleared of forest cover by the early settlers.

However, the big step came in 1961, when the Chairman of the Forests Commission, Alf Lawrence attended the World Forestry Conference in São Paulo Brazil and upon his return took a bold decision to commit Victoria to a massive Plantation Expansion (PX) program which initiated nearly four decades of rapid plantation establishment. At that stage, softwoods were still being imported in large quantities and it was also believed that softwoods could not only relieve the pressure on native forests but make Australia self-sufficient in timber resources.

This overall State program, which commenced in 1949 and expanded in 1961, resulted in the area of State-owned plantations across Victoria increasing from 20,000 hectares to over 100,000 hectares.

A new FCV nursery and workers camp was established at Olsens Bridge, at the head of the Morwell River in 1949, to grow mountain ash seedlings. The nursery and camp were later to become the Morwell River Prison Camp in May 1961, where inmates operated the nursery under the guidance of FCV employees. In the mid-1970s the nursery was producing in excess of one million seedlings each year. Another prison at nearby Yarram at Won Wron grew pines from about 1962. The Morwell River prison closed in 1997 while Won Wron prison closed in 2004.

By June 1986 the FCV had purchased over 400 properties with a total area of 28000 ha. At the same time, APM held a similar estate of 24000 ha purchased land plus 8600 ha of crown land leasehold.

The steep terrain and large size of some of the wattle regrowth on the purchased properties meant that large bulldozers were required to clear most of the land for planting, but some of the lighter scrub areas were cleared using hand tools by inmates from the Prison Camp, with crews of up to 40 people at a time.

Much of this original planting work was successful, with large areas subsequently harvested and replanted. Significant areas of hardwood plantings on the steeper areas have been reserved for environmental purposes, particularly in the major gullies.

Meanwhile, there was growing disquiet from environment and community groups about the clearing of native forests and conversion to pines, together with the use of chemical sprays. So in the 1970s the Commission commenced major environmental studies in north-east Victoria into the effects of plantations. The studies included surveys of the biology of existing plantations compared to adjoining native forests as well as the impact of plantations on the catchment hydrology.

Subsequent Land Conservation Council reviews, beginning in the 1970s, restricted the areas of new softwood plantations on public land and by 1987 degraded farmland was being purchased for the PX program and the clearing of native forest halted.

The entire FCV plantation estate was transferred to the State owned entity, the Victorian Plantations Corporation (VPC) in 1993. The VPC was later sold in 1998 to American superannuation company Hancock Timber Resource Group for $550 million to become Hancock Victorian Plantations (HVP).

In August 2001, Hancock Victoria Plantations consolidated its plantation holdings by purchasing the assets of Australian Paper Plantations for over A$150 million.

After many years of lobbying by environmental groups, about 8000 ha of land was returned to public ownership in 2006 under a $5.5M agreement between Hancock Victorian Plantations (HVP) and the State Government into what is known as the "Cores and Links" reserve. A further 15000 ha of HVP managed native forest has been protected as part of the agreement.

The Black Saturday fire that began near Churchill on 7 February 2009 destroyed a large area of HVP plantation. The trees were quickly salvaged and replanted but it had significant flow-on effects to the continuity of wood supply for local harvesting contractors, sawmills and the papermill at Maryvale.

== Tourism ==
- The spectacular Grand Ridge Road which was built in the 1920s winds through the Ranges, and provides picturesque views to the north over the Latrobe Valley and to the south towards Wilsons Promontory.
- The Grand Strzelecki Track was opened in May 2012 as a walking track over 100 km long from Billy's Creek to the Tarra Bulga National Park that can be completed in stages.
- Agnes Falls near Toora is a spectacular waterfall that cascades over a series of rocks with a 59-metre drop, the highest single span waterfall in Victoria.
- Tarra-Bulga National Park

== Gallery ==
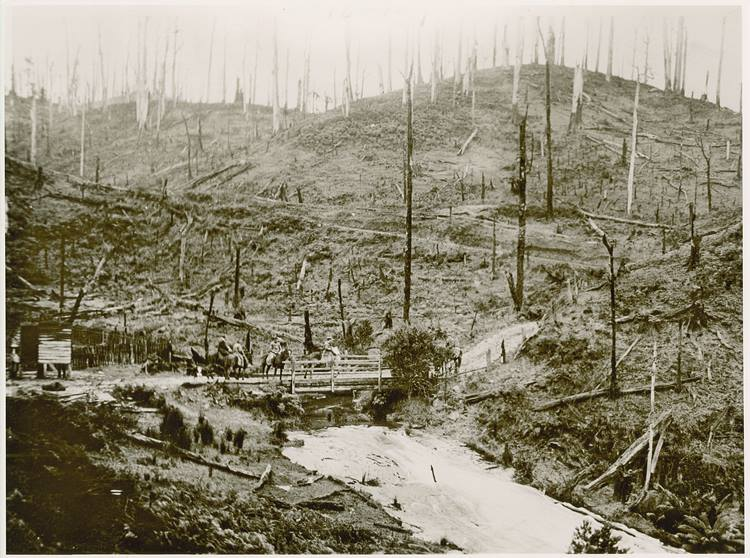
CRB party at Morwell River 1913

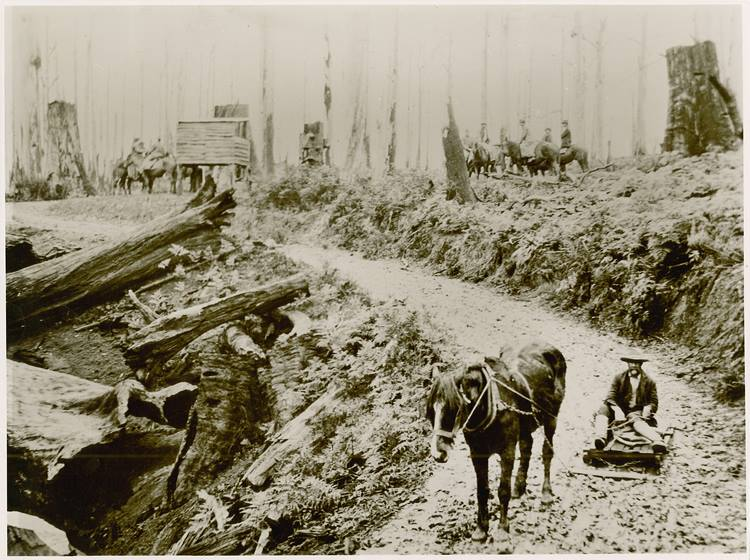
Mud at Gunyah – 1913

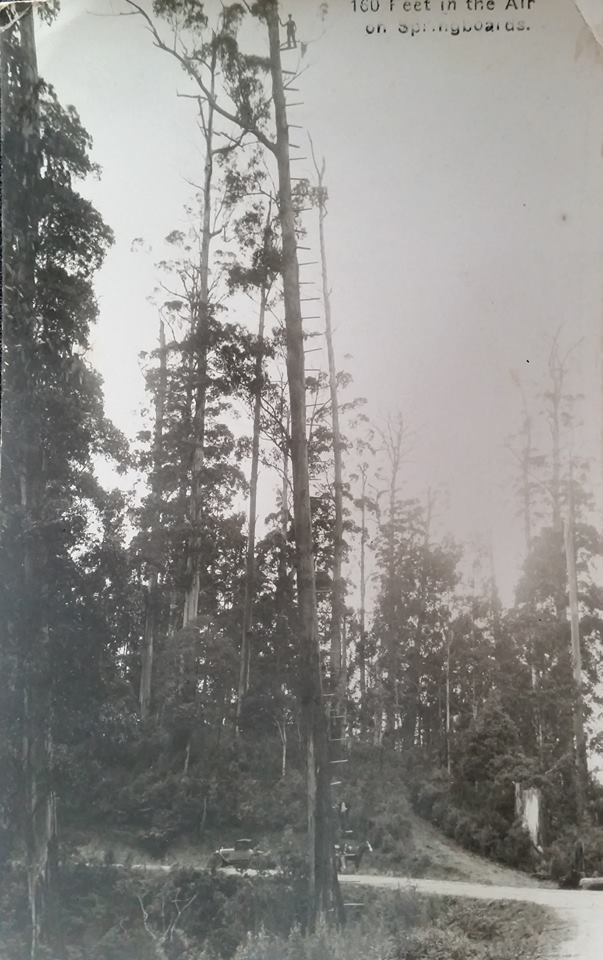
Local identity and axeman, Jack Pattinson cut 50 springboards and climbed to a height of 160 feet in 1927.

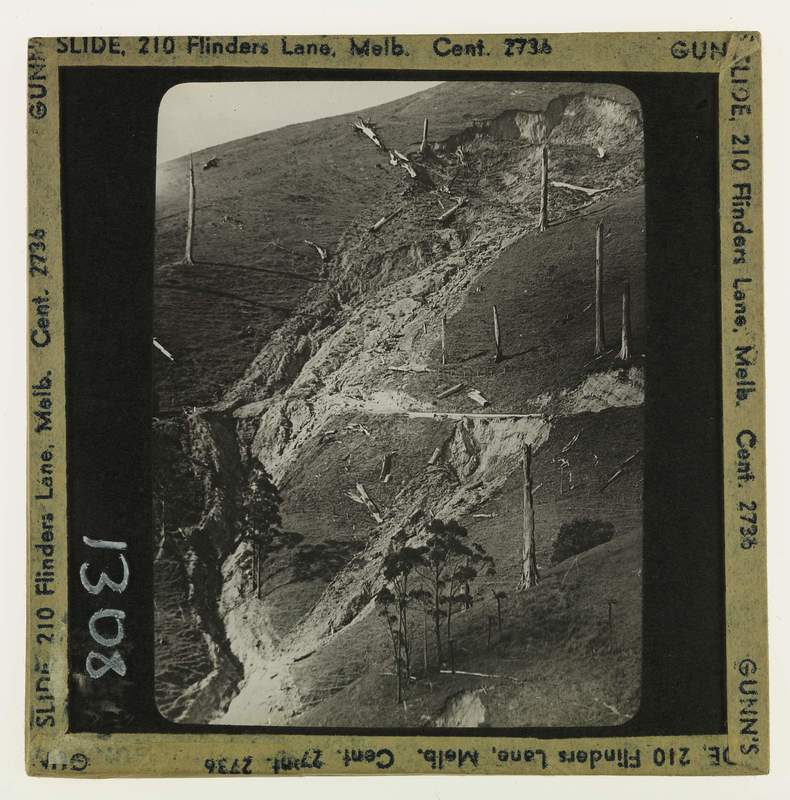
Hillsides in high rainfall areas of the Strzelecki Ranges were prone to slumping after the native vegetation had been removed.

== See also ==
- List of mountains in Australia § Victoria
- Strzelecki (disambiguation)
- Errinundra National Park
- Great Otway National Park
