= Mount Worth State Park =

Protected area in Victoria, Australia

- IUCN category III (natural monument or feature)
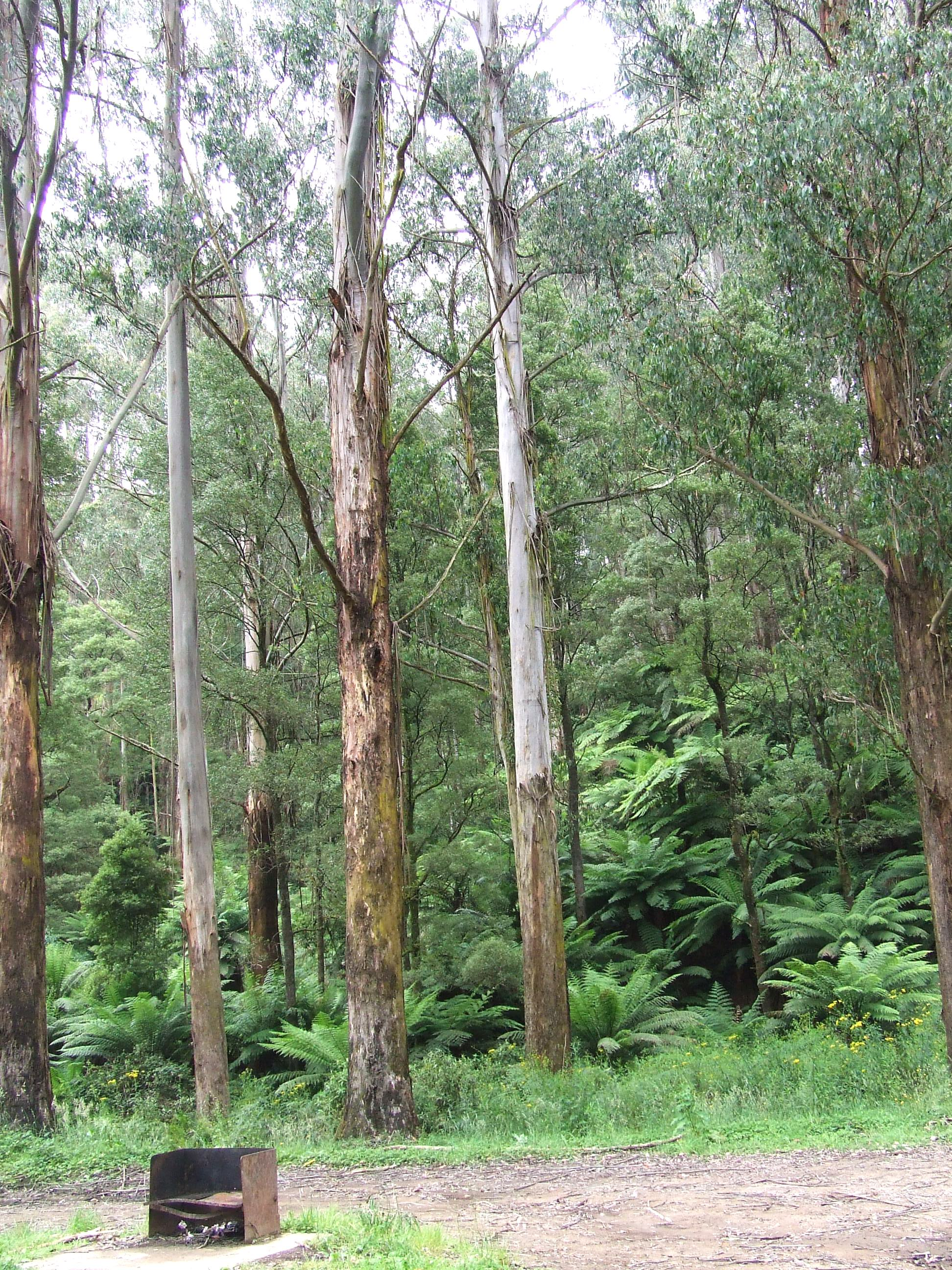
- Mount Worth picnic area

- Location within Victoria
- Location: Victoria
- Nearest city: Warragul
- Coordinates: 38.28489947°S 145.992855°E
- Area: 10.4 km^{2} (4.0 sq mi)
- Established: 1978
- Governing body: Parks Victoria
- Website: Official website

Mount Worth State Park is a state park in Victoria, Australia. It is located 15 km south of Warragul in the western Strzelecki Ranges. It offers rainforest walking trails and scenic views of Gippsland as well as across the Latrobe Valley to the Great Dividing Range.

The wet, mountain rainforest of mountain ash (with at least one specimen 90 metres tall, 7 metres wide and approaching the age of 300 years), blackwood and mountain grey gum supports a wide variety of plants and animals, such as the tree ferns, wombat, possum, platypus, crimson rosella, lyrebird and many others.

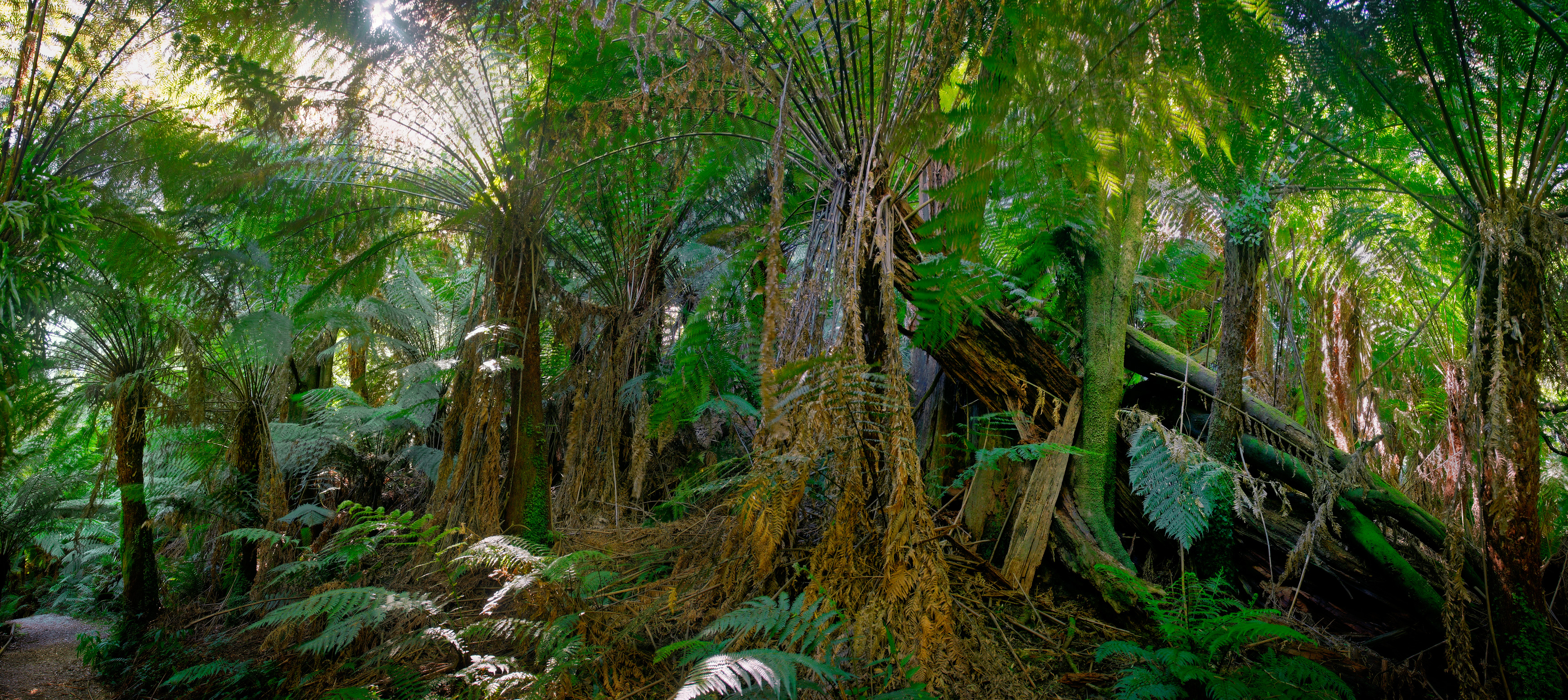
Tree ferns at Mount Worth State Park

== See also ==
- Protected areas of Victoria
