= Gormandale =

Gormandale Victoria
- Coordinates: 38.27°S 146.70°E
- Population: 321 (2016 census)
- Postcode(s): 3873
- Location: 20 km (12 mi) Traralgon of N; 40 km (25 mi) Yarram of S
- LGA(s): Shire of Wellington
- Federal division(s): Gippsland
Localities around Gormandale:
Traralgon	Flynn	Rosedale
Traralgon South	Gormandale	Willung
Tarra-Bulga National Park	Carrajung

Gormandale is a town in eastern Victoria, Australia. The town is situated between Yarram and Traralgon. Gormandale is a popular place to visit for those travelling on the Strzelecki Trail. The 2016 ABS Census recorded 321 people in the Gormandale district, with a median age of 46. Dairy farming is the biggest employer, followed by beef cattle and alpaca farming, building and other industrial cleaning services, nursery production and the general store. The town also has a state primary school (Gormandale & District Primary School), and a privately run kindergarten.
