= Dumbalk =

- Town
- Coordinates: 38°32′02″S 146°05′40″E
- Country: Australia
- State: Victoria
- LGA: South Gippsland Shire

Government
  - State electorate: Gippsland South
  - Federal division: Monash
- Elevation: 56.3 m (185 ft)

Population
  - Total: 413 (2016 census)
- Postcode: 3956

Dumbalk is a town in the South Gippsland region of Victoria, Australia. It lies at the heart of the South Gippsland dairy industry, centered in the Tarwin Valley, featuring lush green pastures most of the year around. The word Dumbalk is of Aboriginal origin; it means winter frost and rain, referring to high local rainfall.

== Recreational activities ==
Recreational activities include local campdrafting, football, netball, cricket, indoor bowls and regular dances in the town hall.
