= Carrajung =

- Town
- Coordinates: 38°22′S 146°41′E
- Country: Australia
- State: Victoria
- LGA: Shire of Wellington
- Location: 195 km (121 mi) E of Melbourne; 32 km (20 mi) S of Traralgon; 35 km (22 mi) NW of Woodside

Government
  - State electorate: Gippsland South
  - Federal division: Gippsland
- Elevation: 700 m (2,300 ft)

Population
  - Total: 102 (2016 census)
- Postcode: 3844
- County: Buln Buln
- Mean max temp: 35 °C (95 °F)
- Mean min temp: −2 °C (28 °F)
- Annual rainfall: 760 mm (30 in)

Carrajung is a town in eastern Victoria, Australia. Carrajung is situated between Yarram and Traralgon, about 5 kilometres from the Hyland Highway at a height of approximately 520 metres above sea level. Carrajung is situated close to the eastern end of the Grand Ridge Road.

It has a population of around 100 people. Carrajung has a community football oval, a community and disaster recovery hall, and a primary school building that is now closed. Carrajung Post Office opened on 1 November 1887 and closed in 1974. Carrajung Lower, nearby, had a Post Office open from 1902 until 1911, and from 1922 until 1969 although known as Bruthen Creek until 1926.

The name Carrajung is thought to have been derived from an Aboriginal word meaning a fishing line.
