= Leongatha =

- Town
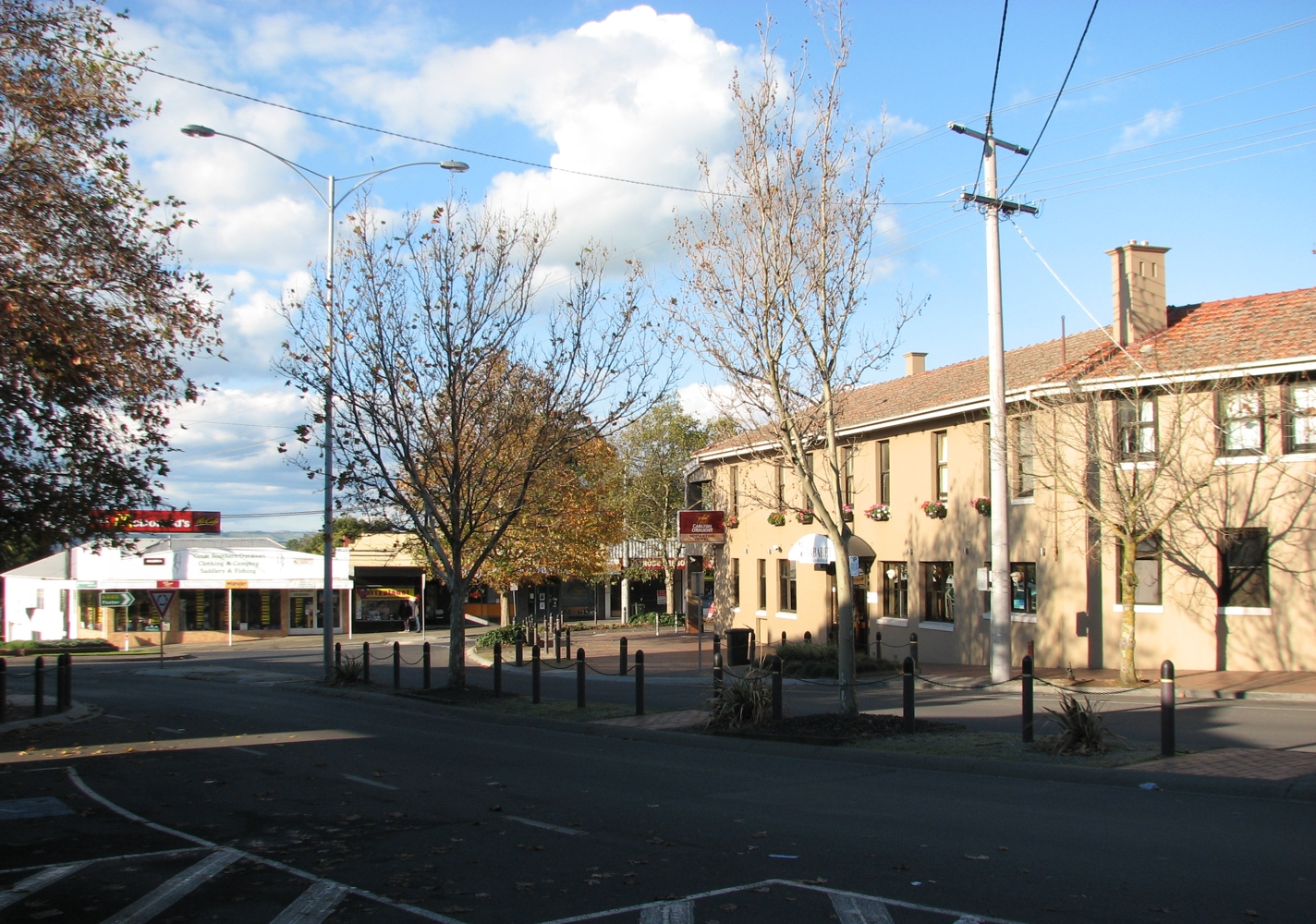
- McCartin Street

- Coordinates: 38°29′0″S 145°57′0″E
- Country: Australia
- State: Victoria
- LGA: South Gippsland Shire
- Location: 135 km (84 mi) SE of Melbourne; 59 km (37 mi) SW of Morwell; 27 km (17 mi) NE of Inverloch; 39 km (24 mi) NE of Wonthaggi

Government
  - State electorate: Gippsland South
  - Federal division: Monash
- Elevation: 88.0 m (288.7 ft)

Population
  - Total: 5,869 (2021 census)
- Postcode: 3953
- County: Buln Buln
- Mean max temp: 19.0 °C (66.2 °F)
- Mean min temp: 8.4 °C (47.1 °F)
- Annual rainfall: 970.4 mm (38.20 in)
Localities around Leongatha
Ruby	Leongatha North	Boorool
Korumburra	Leongatha	Nerrena
Leongatha South	Leongatha South	Koonwarra

Leongatha (/liːnˈɡæθə/ leen-GATH-ə) is a town in the foothills of the Strzelecki Ranges, Victoria, Australia, located 135 kilometres (84 mi) south-east of Melbourne. At the 2021 census, Leongatha had a population of 5,869.

Canadian dairy company Saputo which trades in Australia under the Devondale label, among others, has a dairy processing plant on the north side of the town producing milk-based products for Australian and overseas markets.

== History ==
First settlement of the area by Europeans occurred in 1845. The Post Office opened as Koorooman on 1 October 1887 and renamed Leongatha in 1891 when a township was established on the arrival of the railway.

The railway line from Melbourne reached the town in 1891, and stimulated further settlement. Regular V/Line passenger operations on the line to the local railway station ceased in 1993.

The Leongatha Magistrates' Court closed on 1 January 1990.

The town made international media headlines in 2023, when four people were taken to hospital after consuming beef Wellington suspected to have contained death cap mushrooms. Three of the four guests subsequently died, and one survived, later receiving a liver transplant. The woman who cooked the meal, Erin Patterson, was found guilty of murder in July 2025.

== Climate ==
Leongatha has an oceanic climate (Köppen: Cfb), with warm summers and cool winters. Average maxima vary from 24.9 °C (76.8 °F) in February to 13.0 °C (55.4 °F) in July, while average minima fluctuate between 12.3 °C (54.1 °F) in February and 4.8 °C (40.6 °F) in July. Precipitation is moderate (averaging 970.4 mm (38.20 in) per annum), and is frequent (spread between 174.8 precipitation days).

Climate data for Leongatha (38.47°S 145.97°E, 88 m AMSL) (1896–1957 normals & extremes)
Month	Jan	Feb	Mar	Apr	May	Jun	Jul	Aug	Sep	Oct	Nov	Dec	Year
Mean daily maximum °C (°F)	24.8 (76.6)	24.9 (76.8)	23.2 (73.8)	19.2 (66.6)	16.1 (61.0)	13.5 (56.3)	13.0 (55.4)	14.1 (57.4)	16.4 (61.5)	18.5 (65.3)	20.8 (69.4)	23.2 (73.8)	19.0 (66.2)
Mean daily minimum °C (°F)	11.5 (52.7)	12.3 (54.1)	11.1 (52.0)	9.2 (48.6)	7.2 (45.0)	5.4 (41.7)	4.8 (40.6)	5.3 (41.5)	6.6 (43.9)	7.9 (46.2)	9.2 (48.6)	10.7 (51.3)	8.4 (47.2)
Average precipitation mm (inches)	59.0 (2.32)	60.7 (2.39)	70.4 (2.77)	87.7 (3.45)	84.7 (3.33)	94.6 (3.72)	82.9 (3.26)	94.7 (3.73)	87.6 (3.45)	95.6 (3.76)	82.3 (3.24)	67.5 (2.66)	970.4 (38.20)
Average precipitation days (≥ 0.2 mm)	9.8	8.9	11.1	14.5	16.5	17.9	17.9	19.5	16.9	16.3	14.3	11.2	174.8
Source: Bureau of Meteorology (1896–1957 normals & extremes)

== Transport ==
The town is located on the South Gippsland Highway which links Leongatha to Melbourne. Leongatha was formerly situated along the South Gippsland railway corridor that operated to its terminus at Yarram in the early 1980s and Leongatha in the mid-1990s. A V/Line road coach service replaced the rail service on 24 July 1993, running between Melbourne and Yarram.

A second service runs from Traralgon to Wonthaggi. There was also a third bus service running from Venus Bay, through Tarwin Lower and Koonwarra connecting with the V/Line services that depart from Leongatha. This was a trial service and no longer operates. The Leongatha Airport is located south of the town and serves general aviation.

== Education ==
Leongatha is a major educational hub for South Gippsland, and contains several schools, including:

- Leongatha Secondary College, result of a merger between Leongatha Technical School and Leongatha High School.
- Leongatha Primary School
- South Gippsland Specialist School
- GippsTafe (Leongatha Campus)
- St Laurence O'Toole Catholic Primary School
- Mary MacKillop Catholic Regional College
- Chairo Christian School – For prep level to year 10. Also provides three to four year-old Kindergarten.

The town also has two kindergartens (Allora and Hasset Street), and two childcare centres (Brown Street and Leongatha Children's), which both have kindergarten rooms.

== Tourism ==
A Daffodil Festival is held annually in September. Competitions are held and many daffodil varieties are on display. A garden competition is also held.

The railway line from Nyora through Leongatha to Foster has been converted into the Great Southern Rail Trail, for the shared use of horse riding, walking and cycling. The trail runs to Yarram with a side trail from Alberton to Port Albert.

== Community ==
Leongatha has a community theatre company, the "Lyric Theatre Company" that regularly stages theatrical productions. The town has a medieval society, the "Leongatha Medieval Society", which re-enacts 14th-century weapons, armour and fighting styles. The Medieval Society can be seen each month at Coal Creek Community Park and Museum at Korumburra.

Leongatha offers a range of sports including: athletics, basketball, badminton, cricket, croquet, cycling (BMX, road and track), equestrian, football (Australian rules, association and indoor soccer), golf, gymnastics, hockey (field and underwater), lawn bowls, martial arts (karate and taekwondo), netball, shooting, skateboarding, softball, squash, swimming, table tennis, tennis, and volleyball (indoor and beach). The town's Australian rules football club, the Leongatha Football Club ("The Parrots"), competes in the Gippsland Football League. Golfers play at the course of the Leongatha Golf Club on Inverloch-Koonwarra Road, Leongatha South, or at the course of the Woorayl Golf Club at the Recreation Reserve.

Community services include CFA, SES, Police, ambulance. Other community organisations include Scouts (cubs, scouts, venturers and rovers), Girl Guides, and Salvation Army Youth Corps. The town also boasts a large YMCA complex (including pool, gym and basketball courts) plus a four theatre complex.

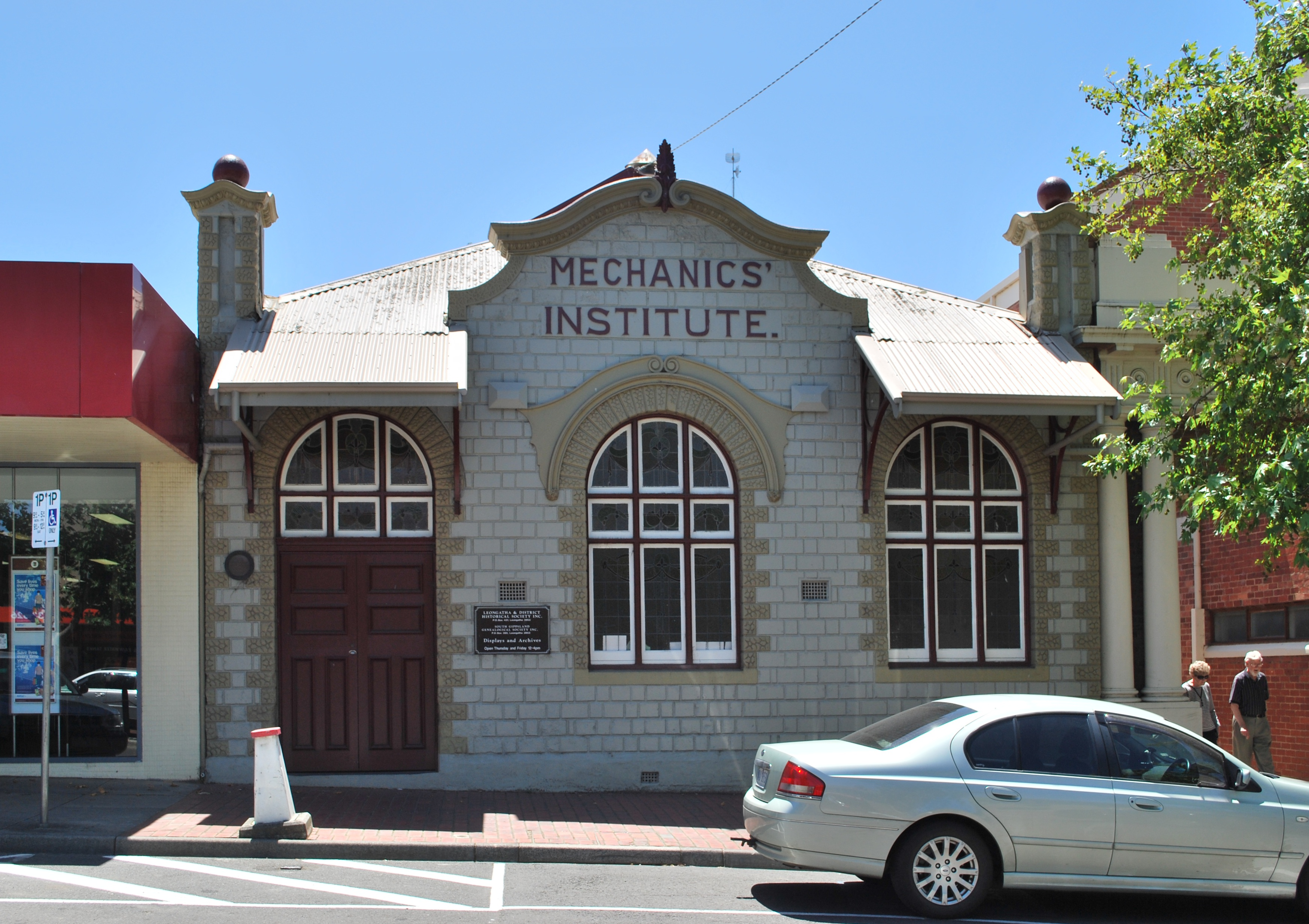
Mechanics Institute

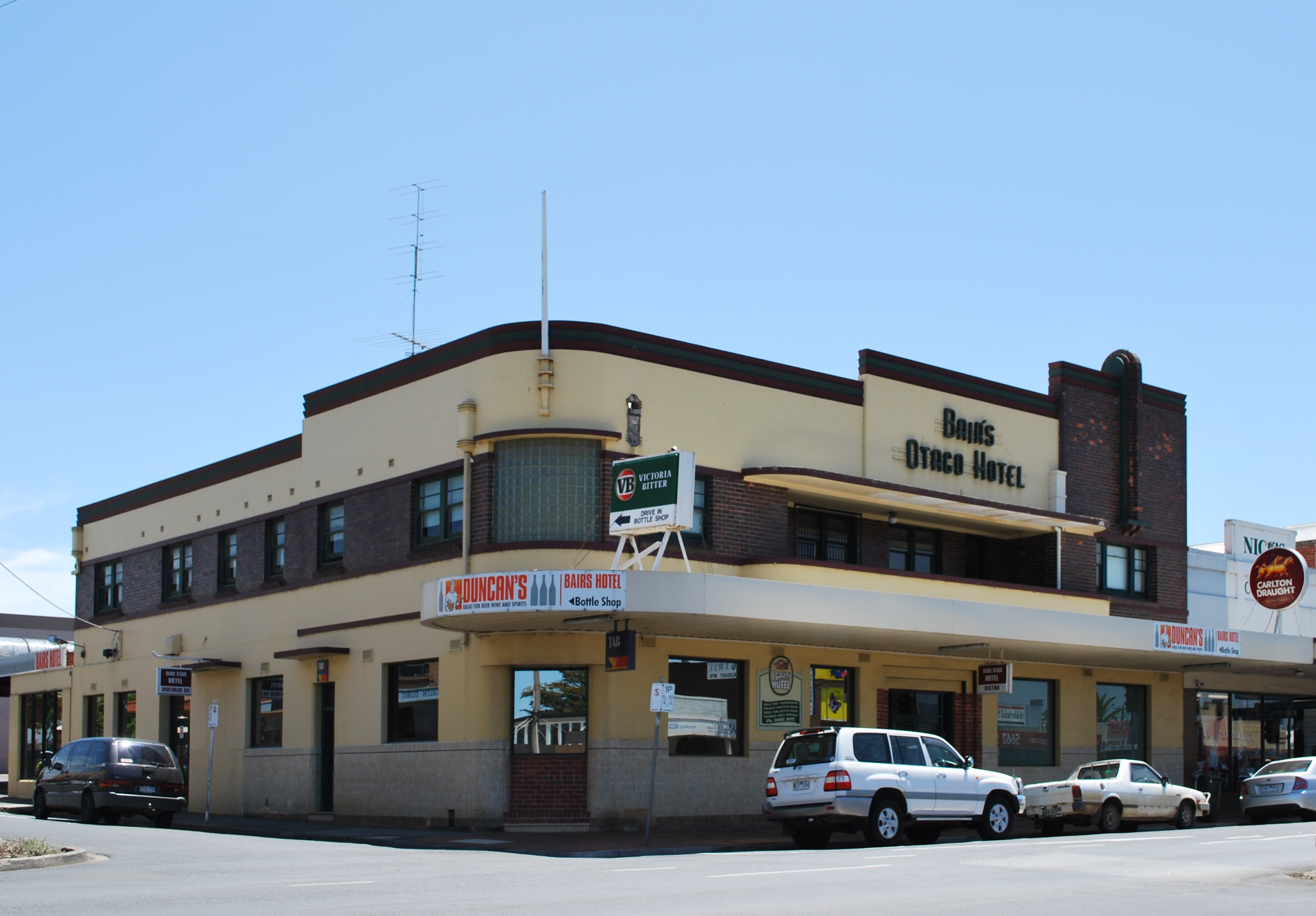
Bair's Otago Hotel

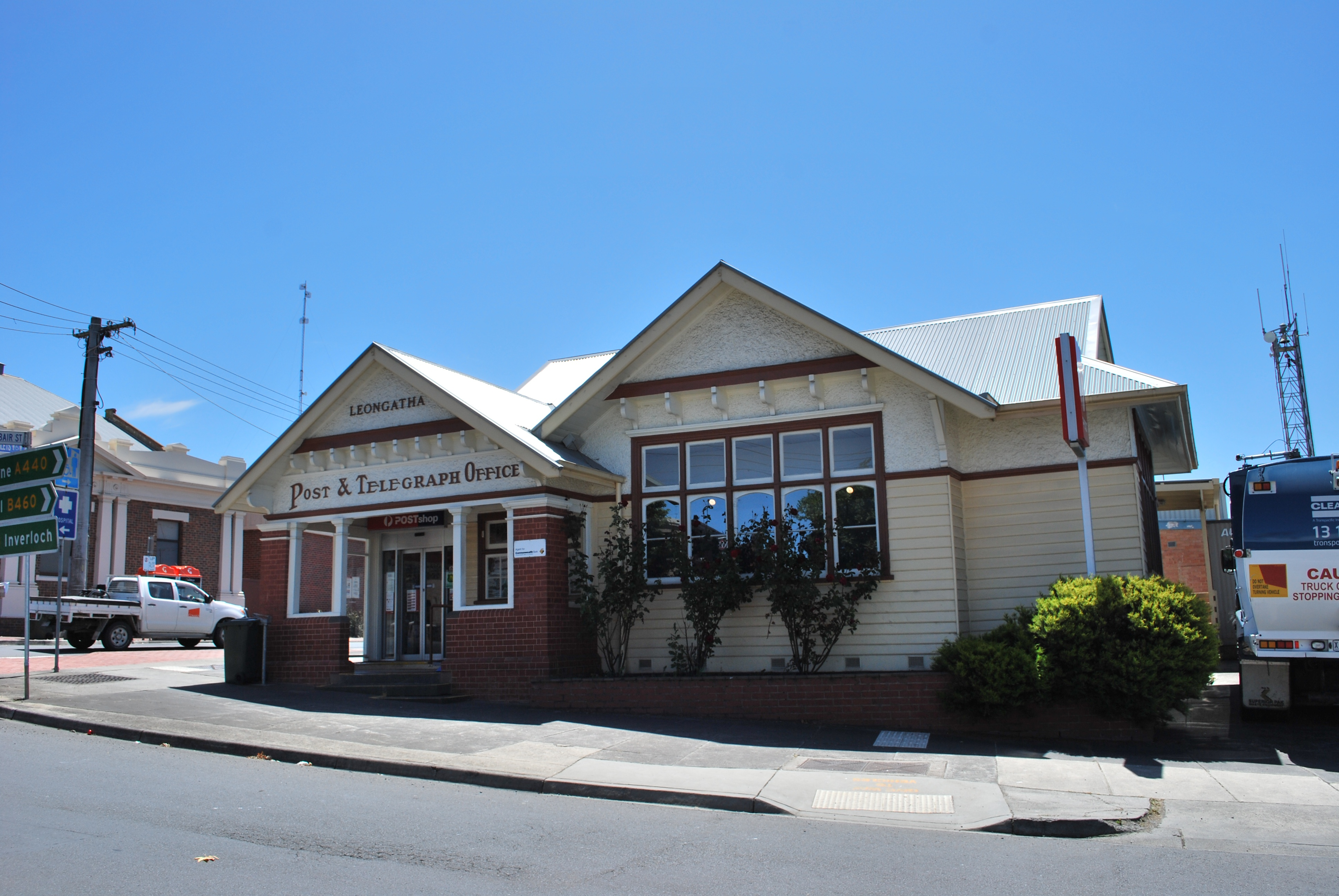
Post Office

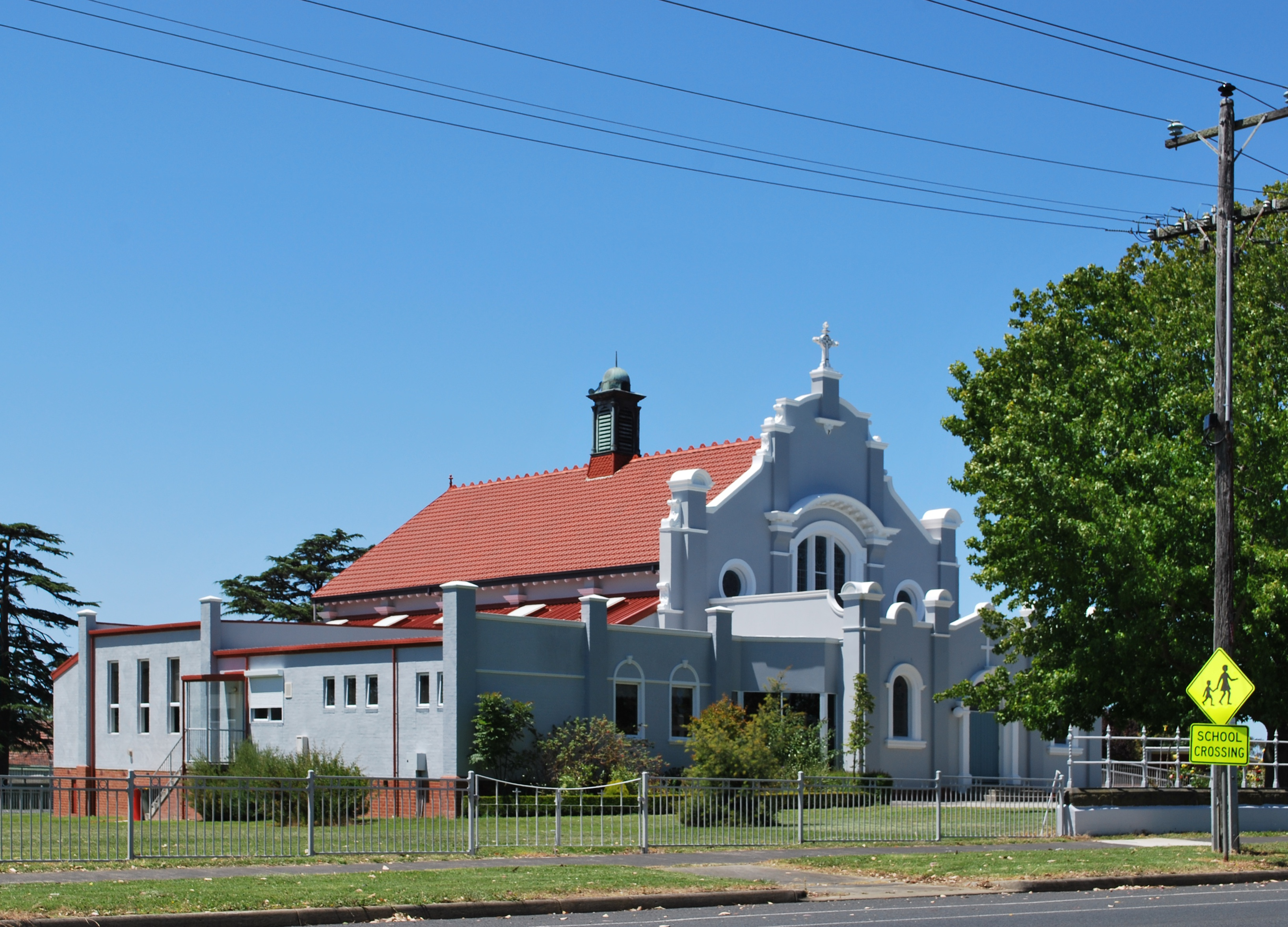
Catholic Church

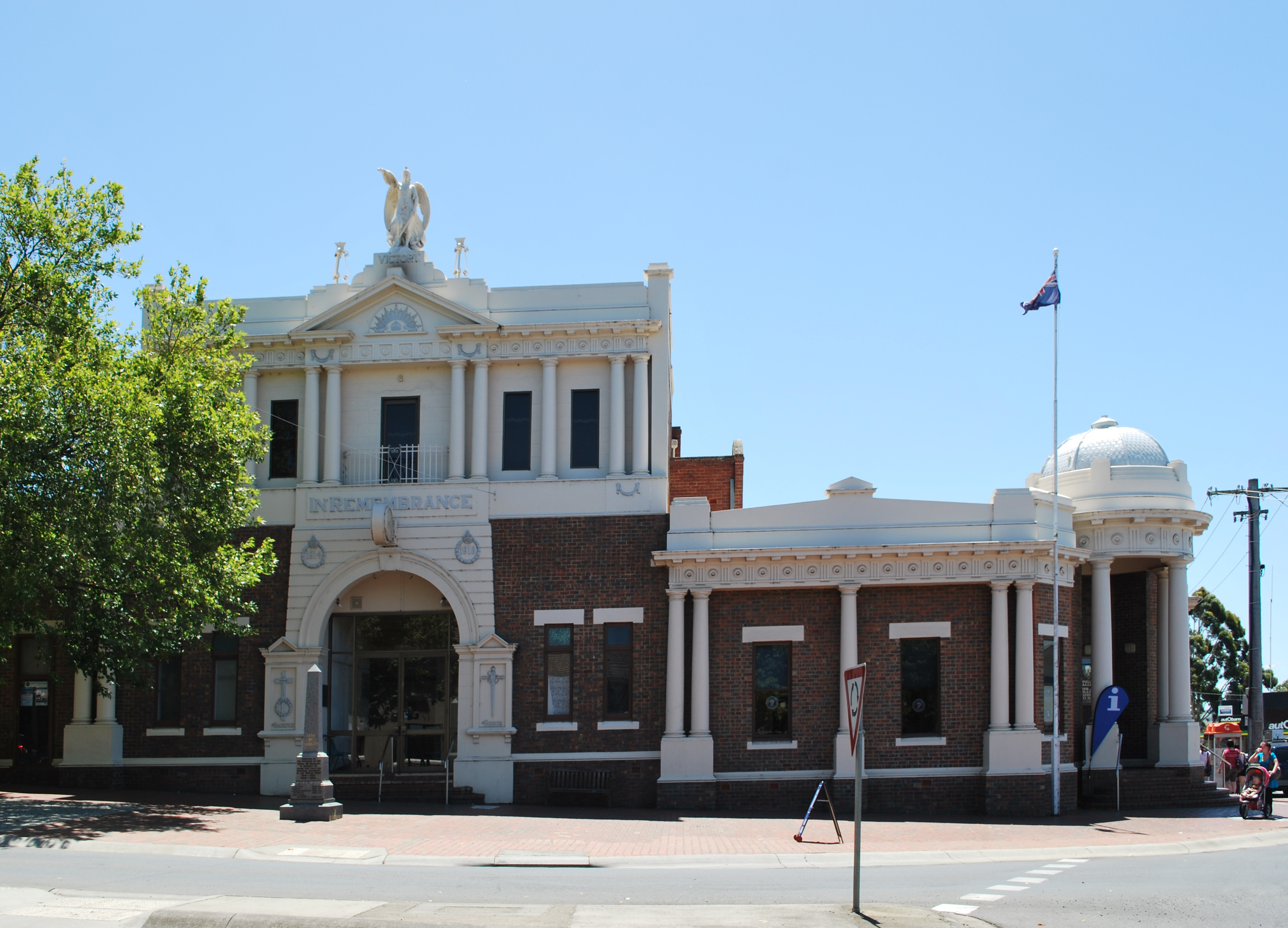
Leongatha War Memorial Hall

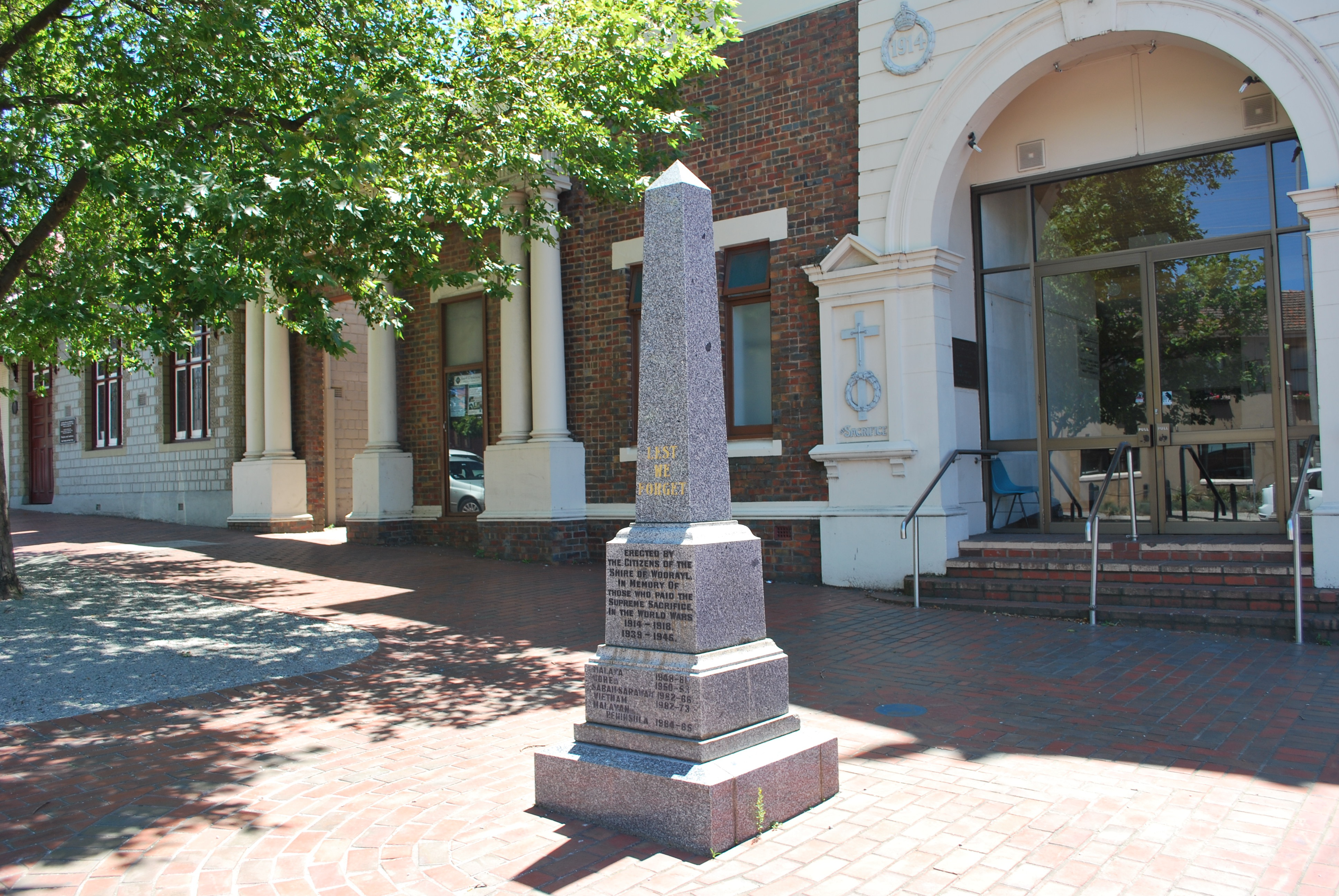
War memorial

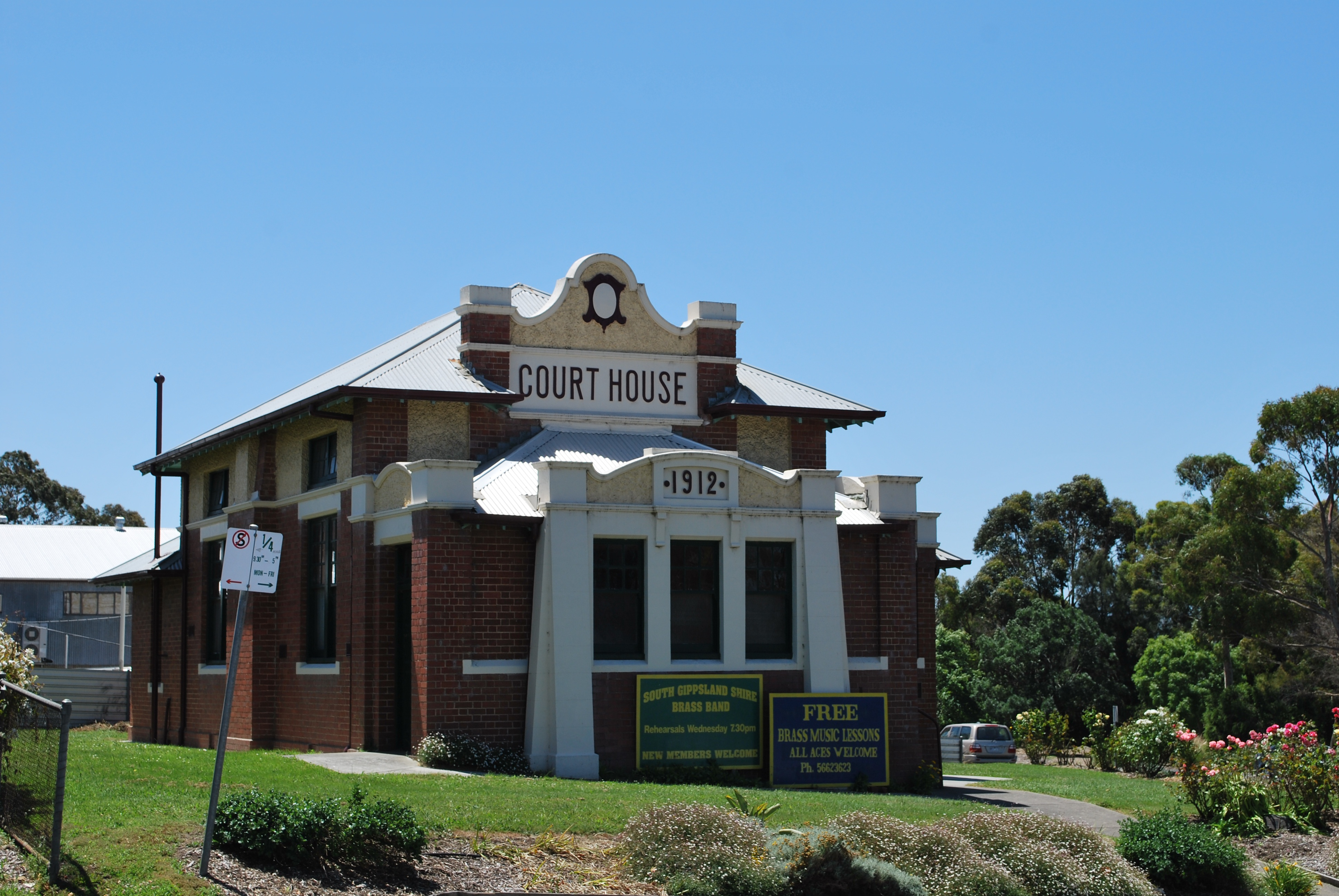
Court House

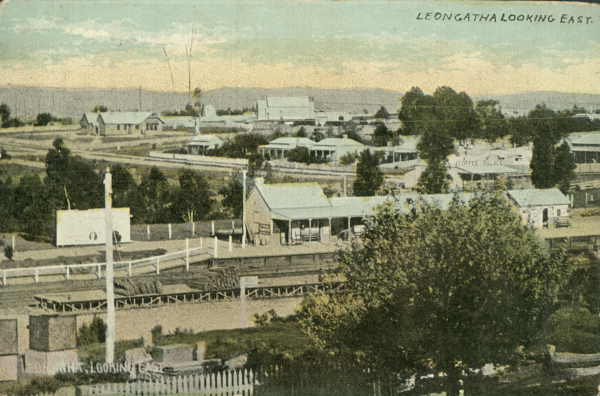
Leongatha eastview

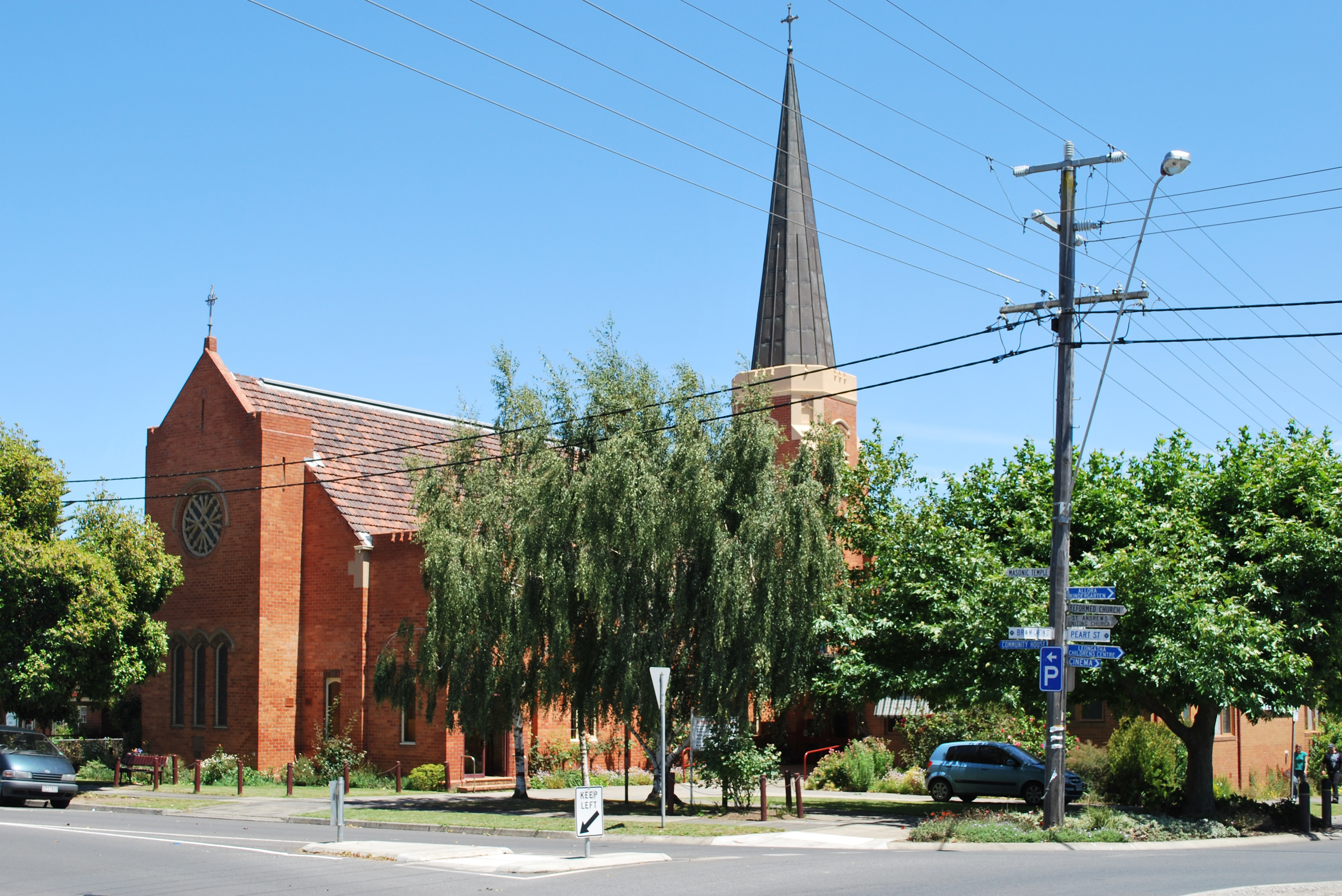
Anglican Church

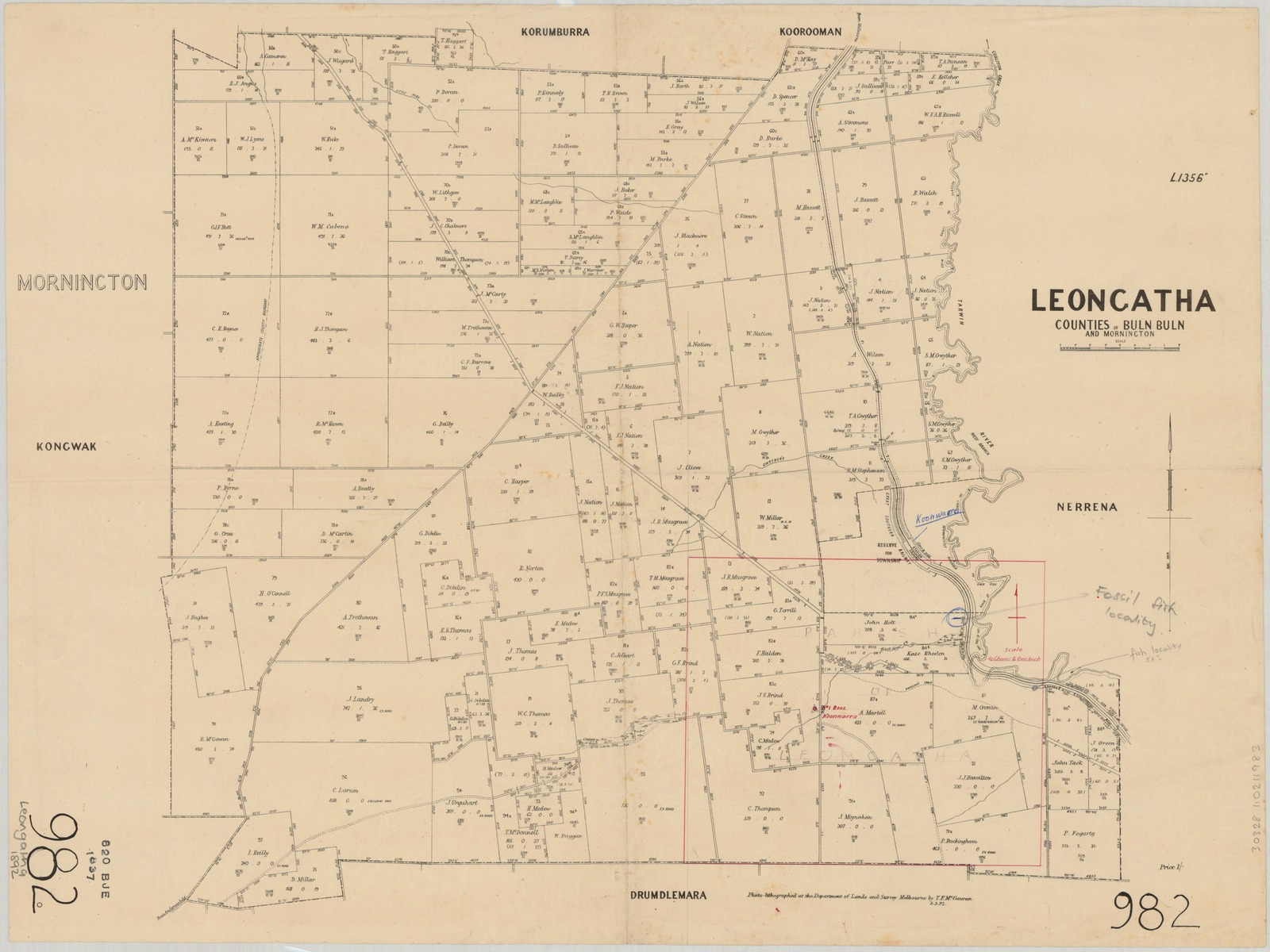
Leongatha, Crown Lands and Survey 1892
