= List of places on the Victorian Heritage Register in the City of Latrobe =

This is a list of places on the Victorian Heritage Register in the City of Latrobe in Victoria, Australia. The Victorian Heritage Register is maintained by the Heritage Council of Victoria.

The Victorian Heritage Register, as of 2021, lists the following nine state-registered places within the City of Latrobe:

Place name	Place #	Location	Suburb or Town	Co-ordinates	Built	State registered	Photo
Azarole Hawthorn tree	H2135	Victory Park, Mill Street	Traralgon	38.195889°S 146.541694°E	Unknown	12 February 2009	
Court House (and Post Office)	H1488	161-165 Franklin Street	Traralgon	38.195139°S 146.537750°E	1886	20 August 1982	
Former Yallourn Power Station Administrative Building	H1054	Yallourn Drive	Yallourn	38.174667°S 146.348472°E	1922	15 March 2001	
Loren	H1283	Old Gippstown, 211 Lloyd Street	Moe	38.185333°S 146.236278°E	1853	9 January 1997	
Mechanics Institute and Free Library	H0544	12-16 King Street	Toongabbie	38.059000°S 146.622361°E	1883	14 December 1983	
Morwell Power Station and Briquette Factory	H2377	412 Commercial Road	Morwell	38.253590°S 146.414851°E	1949	1 March 2018	
No. 21 Dredger	H2130	Ridge Rd	Morwell	38.243000°S 146.412722°E	1949	12 August 2010	
Staplegrove Meat Works	H1666	50 Berkleys Road	Flynn	38.173306°S 146.700361°E	1870	13 September 2007	
Traralgon Engine Shed and Turntable	H1979	Queens Parade	Traralgon	38.198639°S 146.540278°E	1902	10 April 2003	
