= Gippsland Plains Rail Trail =

Recreational area in Victoria, Australia

The Gippsland Plains Rail Trail is a 67 km recreational trail following the former historic Gippsland Plains railway line/ Maffra railway line route between Traralgon and Stratford in Central Gippsland, Victoria. The trail passes through dairy country, the foothills of the Great Dividing Range to the north, and across the Great Gippsland Plains.

The rail line was built in 1883, and was a busy route until the 1950s as an alternative route to East Gippsland. The train line carried sugar beet from Maffra, and timber from Heyfield.

Towns on the route are: Traralgon, Glengarry, Toongabbie, Cowwarr, Heyfield, Maffra and Stratford.

== Routes ==
=== Traralgon – Glengarry (10km) ===
Officially commencing at the intersection of Marshalls Rd and the Traralgon-Maffra Rd (C105), the trail passes through the scenic Latrobe River floodplain and over four spectacular restored bridges.

=== Glengarry – Toongabbie (9km) ===
This smooth, well packed gravel path leads to Eaglehawk Creek, offering a scenic picnic spot. Toongabbie is a popular spot to explore due to the Toongabbie wetlands and the Ned Stringer Memorial.

=== Toongabbie – Cowwarr (9km) ===
This section has a well formed gravel path that sets out across the plains with views towards the Great Dividing Range. The trail passes through the remnant red gum forest and the lush farmland. Relics of the old Cowwarr Railway Station and rail head can be seen in this section.

The small township of Cowwarr has its history built on gold prospecting era. Today, historic buildings remain including the Cowwarr Butter Factory (now the Cowwarr Art Space), the original Cowwarr General Store and one remaining hotel, The Cricket Club.

=== Cowwarr – Dawson – Heyfield (11km) ===
This section has a well packed gravel surface. Heading out of Cowarr the trail continues past the scenic Rainbow Creek crossing and through the rich river flats. The trail passes through Dawson Flora Reserve, housing many significant flora species and can be found along the trail's shoulder.

Heyfield offers several dining and accommodation options.

=== Heyfield – Tinamba (10km) ===
The trail follows the South shoulder of Traralgon-Maffra Road (C105) for a kilometre before crossing the road and heading northeast. The going here is flat and easy on well packed gravel, and much of the trail on this section has recently seen major improvements.

=== Tinamba – Maffra (8km) ===
This section of the trail has an excellent surface and passes through wetlands, forest and a number of creek crossings. Remnants of an old railway bridge can be seen just after passing Riversdale Road, just outside Maffra. The trail passes through dense forest before it meets the Macalister River where a bridge crossing reaches Macalister Park.

The historic town of Maffra is popular with tourists, visiting the remnant of the town's ties to the sugar beet industry of the early 1900s. Today, the Beet Museum can be visited, and the Gippsland Vehicle Collection is a popular attraction in the town.

=== Maffra – Powerscourt – Stratford (10km) ===
The trail follows the main railway line through quintessentially country landscape on a path that is flat, solid packed, and easily ridden.

== Rail trail map ==
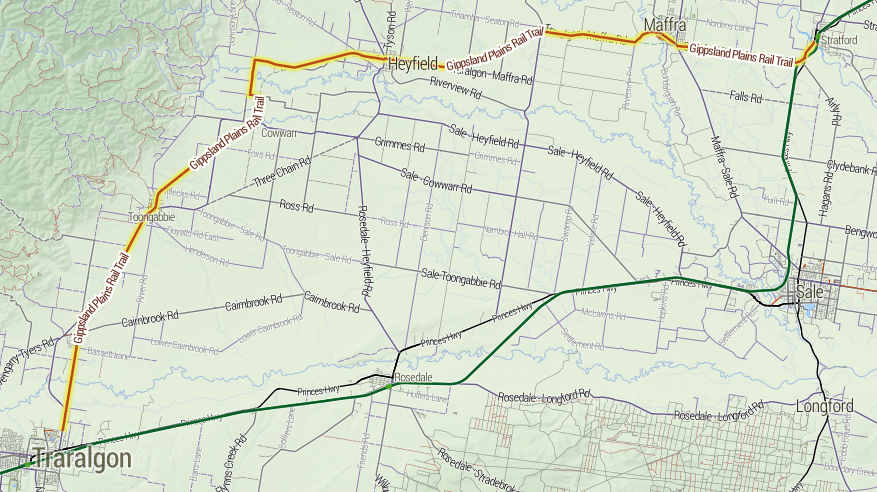
Map of the Gippsland Plains Rail Trail.
