= Newborough, Victoria =

Newborough
- Town
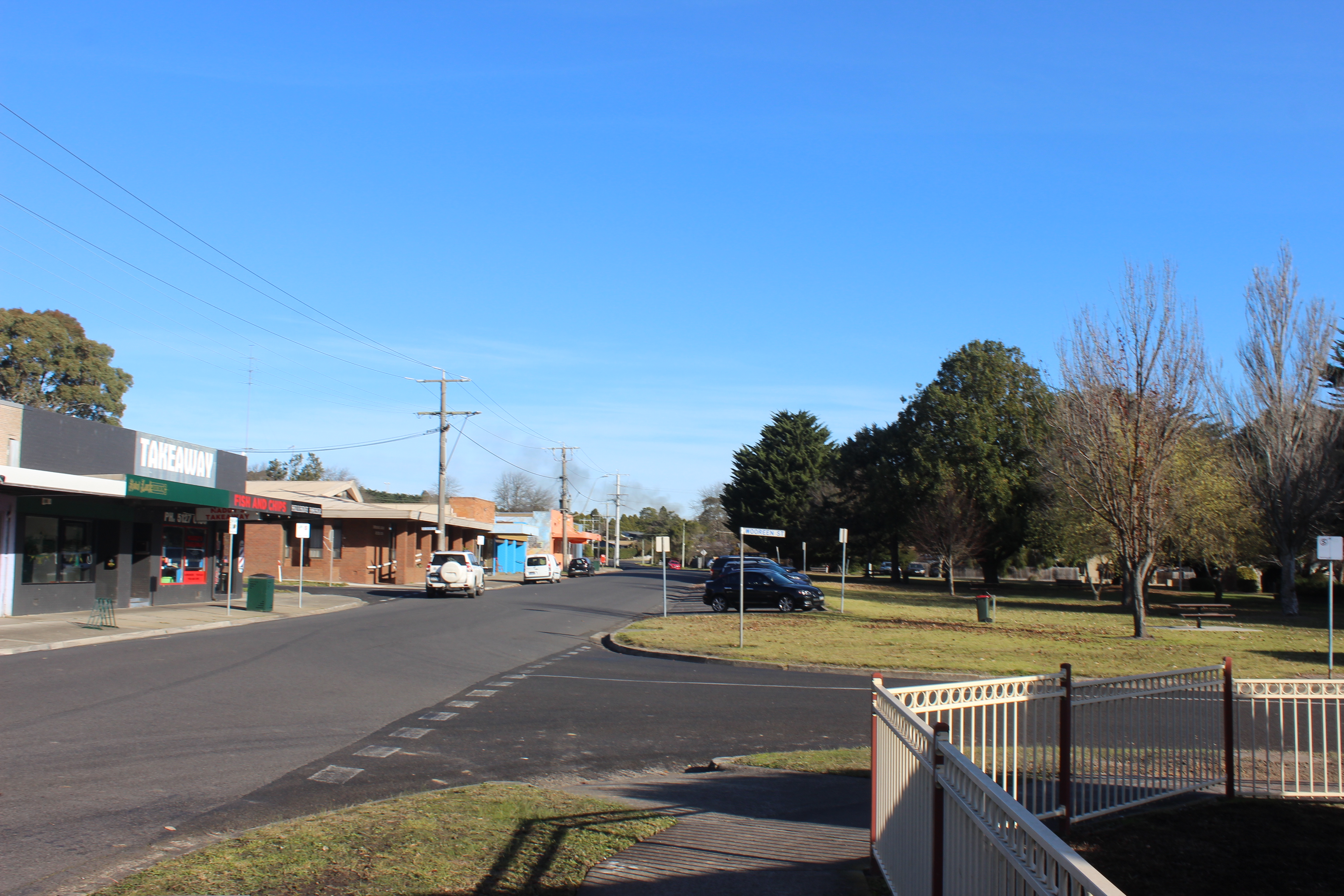
- Boolarra Avenue

- Coordinates: 38°10′S 146°14′E
- Country: Australia
- State: Victoria
- LGA: City of Latrobe
- Location: 137 km (85 mi) E of Melbourne; 19 km (12 mi) NW of Morwell; 4 km (2.5 mi) E of Moe CBD

Government
  - State electorate: Morwell
  - Federal division: Monash

Population
  - Total: 6,886 (2021 census)
- Postcode: 3825

Newborough is a town in the Latrobe Valley in Victoria, Australia which shares a border to its west, mostly along the Narracan Creek, with the town of Moe. It can be divided into three areas, Old Newborough, East Newborough and North Newborough. The latter two areas were developed by the State Electricity Commission of Victoria in the 1950s as residential housing for workers at the nearby Yallourn coal mining, power generation and briquette making works. Newborough now has a higher than average proportion of retirees and aged residents, and it has been suggested that it owes its generally quiet character to this fact. At the 2016 census, Newborough had a population of 6,763.

The town's name was chosen in a competition open to local residents, which was won by James Bowman, an elderly Scottish migrant. Bowman suggested 'Newborough', which was named after his home town in Scotland.

Newborough Post Office opened on 1 October 1942 and Newborough East Post Office opened on 1 March 1951. A Newborough North Post Office opened on 1 July 1965 but was closed a little more than a year later.

The town is also home to an artist community, drawn by the Gippsland area and the quiet country lifestyle the town offers. Many artists and crafts partisans have set up small businesses.

Newborough is serviced by the Princes Freeway and is within a few kilometres of the Yallourn Power Station and the township of Yallourn North.

Newborough is the closest town to Lake Narracan, a storage reservoir for the nearby power stations, but also a popular recreational area.

== Education ==
Primary schools:

- Newborough East Primary School
- Newborough (Murray Road) Primary School
- Immaculate Heart of Mary School

Secondary Colleges:

- Lowanna Secondary College

Tertiary Education:

- TAFE Gippsland, Yallourn Campus

== Transportation ==
Latrobe Valley Bus Lines operates three public bus routes through Newborough:

- Route 5 - Moe to Traralgon via Yallourn North
- Route 14 - Moe to Newborough via Old Sale Road
- Route 15 - Moe to Newborough via Dinwoodie Drive

As with all other public buses in the Latrobe Valley area, fares are paid using Myki.

== Sport ==
Large sporting events are held locally at the Sports and Recreational Centre on Old Sale Road. The centre contains Bob Whitford Cycling Track and Joe Carmody Athletics Track, an 8-laned synthetic all-weather athletic track, home of Moe Little Athletics Centre and Gippsland Athletics Club. It is the only track of its type in Gippsland.

The town has an Australian Rules football team competing in the Mid Gippsland Football League.

The town also has two soccer clubs in the Latrobe Valley Soccer League. The clubs are Monash SC who play at Monash Reserve in Torres Street and Newborough-Yallourn United SC (crowned as champions of Victoria in 1951 whilst still based at Yallourn) who play at WH Burrage Reserve in John Field Drive.

Golfers play at the Yallourn Golf Club on Monash Road or the Moe Golf Club on Thompsons Road., both of which adjoin the town.

In 2021, the Haunted Hills Mountain Bike Park was opened 4-kilometres from the town centre, on Haunted Hills Road. It provides over 11-kilometres of mountain bike tracks for all skill levels.

== See also ==
- Yallourn
- Yallourn Power Station
- City of Latrobe
- Moe
- Lake Narracan
