= Duigan =

Duigan is a surname. Notable people with the surname include:

- Harry Duigan (1875–1931), Australian footballer
- John Robertson Duigan (1882–1951), Australian aviator
- John Duigan (born 1949), Australian film director
- John Evelyn Duigan (1883–1950), New Zealand major general
- Mike Duigan, Australian politician
- Nick Duigan (born 1984), Australian footballer
- Nick Duigan (politician), Australian politician
- Suzanne Duigan (1924–1993), Australian paleobotanist
