= Tyers, Victoria =

Tyers
- Town
- Coordinates: 38°09′S 146°28′E
- Country: Australia
- State: Victoria
- LGA: City of Latrobe
- Location: 158 km (98 mi) E of Melbourne; 10 km (6.2 mi) N of Traralgon

Government
  - State electorate: Morwell
  - Federal division: Gippsland

Population
  - Total: 824 (2016 census)
- Postcode: 3844
Localities around Tyers
Moondarra	Erica	Glengarry
Yallourn North	Tyers	Glengarry
Yallourn North	Traralgon	Traralgon

Tyers is a town in Victoria, Australia. It is 158 kilometres (98 mi) east of Melbourne, 10 kilometres (6 mi) north-west of Traralgon and located in the City of Latrobe. It was known until 1852 as "Boola Boola", after which it was named after the surveyor and explorer Charles Tyers. At the 2016 census, Tyers had a population of 824.

Tyers post office was opened on 11 September 1882 .

The town, in conjunction with neighbouring Traralgon, has an Australian Rules football team, Traralgon-Tyers United, competing in the North Gippsland Football League.

Since 1982, Tyers Lightning Soccer Club have competed in the Latrobe Valley Soccer League, and won back-to-back women's league titles in 2014 and 2015.

The Tyers Arts Festival is an annual event, held since 1979. It is an initiative of the Tyers Primary school and supported by the Tyers community.

A notable resident was Jean Galbraith.

== Features ==
- Tyers Lookout is on the Walhalla-Tyers Road (C481), about two kilometres by road north of the township. It overlooks the Latrobe Valley.

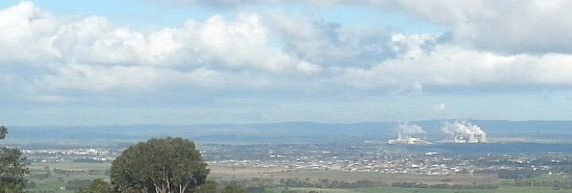
View from Tyers Lookout, 2013

- Peterson's Lookout is a short walk to the lookout overlooking the Tyers River Gorge, 6 km north of the Tyers township on Walhalla-Tyers Road (C481). The walk can also be started at the W2 track where there is signage and a trail which is an extra 4 km return walk, which is certified as a Heart Foundation Walk.
- The Wirilda Walking Tracks are a series of tracks along the Walhalla-Tyers Road (C481), starting from Wirilda Track 2 (W2) and finishing at W18.
