= Suzanne Duigan =

Australian paleobotanist

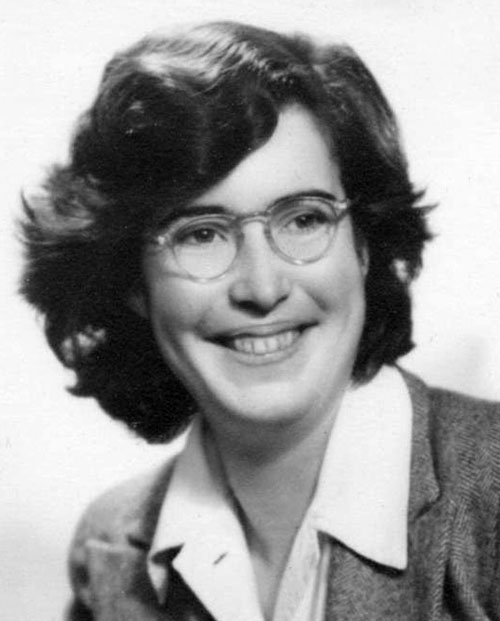
- Suzanne Duigan c1950
- Born: Suzanne Lawless; 7 July 1924; Colac, Western Victoria, Australia
- Died: 1993 (aged 68–69); East Melbourne, Australia

Suzanne Lawless Duigan (7 July 1924 – 1993) was an Australian paleobotanist who specialised in fossil pollen (palynology). She collaborated with fellow botanist Isabel Cookson extensively on Paleogene brown coal deposits in Victoria. She pioneered studies in south east Australian coal measures as she considered micro- and macrofossils of the region in terms of their relationships to living plant species and families and their ecologies.

== Early life and education ==
Duigan was born in Colac in Western Victoria, Australia, on 7 July 1924. She was the third child of Reginald Charles Duigan (a pioneering Australian aviator) and Phyllis Mary Duigan. Duigan attended Elliminyt Primary, Colac High School, The Hermitage CEGS, before studying science at Melbourne University from 1942 to 1946. She was a resident at Janet Clarke Hall, the women's residence of Trinity College, from 1943, participating in the play and serving on the Sports Club committee. After gaining a Bachelor of Science degree, she earned an MSc in botany. She then collaborated with Harry Godwin at the University of Cambridge, Cambridge, UK, gaining a PhD.

== Career ==
Duigan became a lecturer in botany at Melbourne University upon her return and specialised in fossil pollen (palynology). She collaborated with fellow botanist Isabel Cookson extensively on Paleogene brown coal deposits in Victoria. Among taxa she described with Cookson were the early Paleogene proteaceae genera Banksieaephyllum and Banksieaeidites, as well as Araucaria lignitici from the brown coal beds at Yallourn and Agathis parwanensis from Bacchus Marsh. Duigan took a novel approach in considering micro- and macrofossils of the region in terms of their relationships to living plant species and families and their ecologies. She concluded that the dominant vegetation of Paleogene southeastern Australia were Nothofagus, Agathis and members of the laurel family Lauraceae.

== Later life ==
In later life she learned to fly, gaining her private pilot's licence on 6 November 1970. She piloted a Cessna 150 and a Piper 140, often visiting her brother in Flinders Island in Bass Strait in the latter.

== Death and legacy ==
Duigan died in 1993 in East Melbourne, Australia. An issue of the Australian Journal of Botany was dedicated to her in 1997.
