= Flynn, Victoria =

Flynn
- Suburb
- Coordinates: 38.1885981°S 146.6577343°E
- Country: Australia
- State: Victoria
- LGA: City of Latrobe
- Location: 14 km (8.7 mi) NE of Traralgon; 156 km (97 mi) SE of Melbourne

Government
  - State electorate: Morwell Gippsland South
  - Federal division: Gippsland

Population
  - Total: 188 (2021 census)
- Postcode: 3844
Suburbs around Flynn
Glengarry	Glengarry	Rosedale
Traralgon East	Flynn	Rosedale
Loy Yang	Gormandale; Flynns Creek	Willung; Hiamdale

Flynn is a locality in Victoria, Australia, situated on the border of the City of Latrobe and Shire of Wellington. In the 2016 census, Flynn had a population of 180.

A railway station was established on the Gippsland railway line at what was then named Flynn's Creek c. 1880, and was renamed Flynn c. 1910s. It was destaffed in 1926 due to insufficient traffic and was closed permanently in the 1970s. A post office at the station opened in November 1880, was renamed Flinnstead on 1 July 1894, was renamed again to Flynn on 21 September 1926 and closed on 20 December 1968. The station gatehouse was destroyed by fire in 1932, in suspicious circumstances. A state school and store also once existed in the station precinct.

The Princes Highway runs through the locality. A new rest stop was built there in 2017.

The heritage-listed former Staplegrove Meat Works is located in Berkleys Road.
