= Callignee =

- Town
- Coordinates: 38°20′S 146°35′E
- Country: Australia
- State: Victoria
- LGA: City of Latrobe
- Location: 175 km (109 mi) E of Melbourne; 21 km (13 mi) S of Traralgon

Government
  - State electorate: Morwell
  - Federal division: Gippsland

Population
  - Total: 495 (2006 census)
- Postcode: 3844
- County: Buln Buln

Callignee is a locality in the Gippsland region of Victoria, Australia. The locality is 175 kilometres (109 mi) east of the state capital, Melbourne. At the 2006 census, Callignee and the surrounding area had a population of 495.

The locality was severely affected by the Black Saturday bushfires, including four fatalities plus another fatality at nearby Upper Callignee.
