= City of Latrobe =

Coordinates: 38°14′00″S 146°24′00″E

Latrobe City
- Local government area

- Interactive map of Latrobe City
- Country: Australia
- State: Victoria
- Region: Gippsland
- Established: 1994
- Council seat: Morwell

Government
  - Mayor: Cr Darren Howe
  - State electorates: Morwell; Gippsland South
  - Federal divisions: Gippsland; Monash

Area
  - Total: 1,426 km^{2} (551 sq mi)

Population
  - Total: 75,211 (2018)
  - Density: 52.743/km^{2} (136.60/sq mi)
- Gazetted: 2 December 1994
- Website: Latrobe City
LGAs around Latrobe City
Baw Baw	Baw Baw	Wellington
Baw Baw	Latrobe City	Wellington
South Gippsland	South Gippsland	Wellington

The City of Latrobe (until 2000 known as the Shire of La Trobe) is a local government area in the Gippsland region in eastern Victoria, Australia, located in the eastern part of the state. It covers an area of 1,426 square kilometres (551 mi^{2}) and in June 2018 had a population of 75,211. It is primarily urban with the vast majority of its population living within the four major urban areas of Moe-Newborough, Morwell, Traralgon, and Churchill, and other significant settlements in the LGA include Boolarra, Callignee, Glengarry, Jeeralang, Toongabbie, Tyers, Yallourn North and Yinnar.

The city is governed by the Latrobe City Council, with its seat of local government and administrative centre located at the council headquarters, 141 Commercial Road, Morwell. It also has service centres located in Moe, Churchill and Traralgon. The city is named after the Latrobe River and Latrobe Valley, major geographical features that meander through the north of the LGA.

== History ==
The LGA was formed in 1994 from the amalgamation of the City of Moe, City of Morwell, City of Traralgon, Shire of Traralgon, the Yallourn North district of the Shire of Narracan, and the Glengarry and Toongabbie districts of the Shire of Rosedale. The Yallourn Works Area was added in 1996.

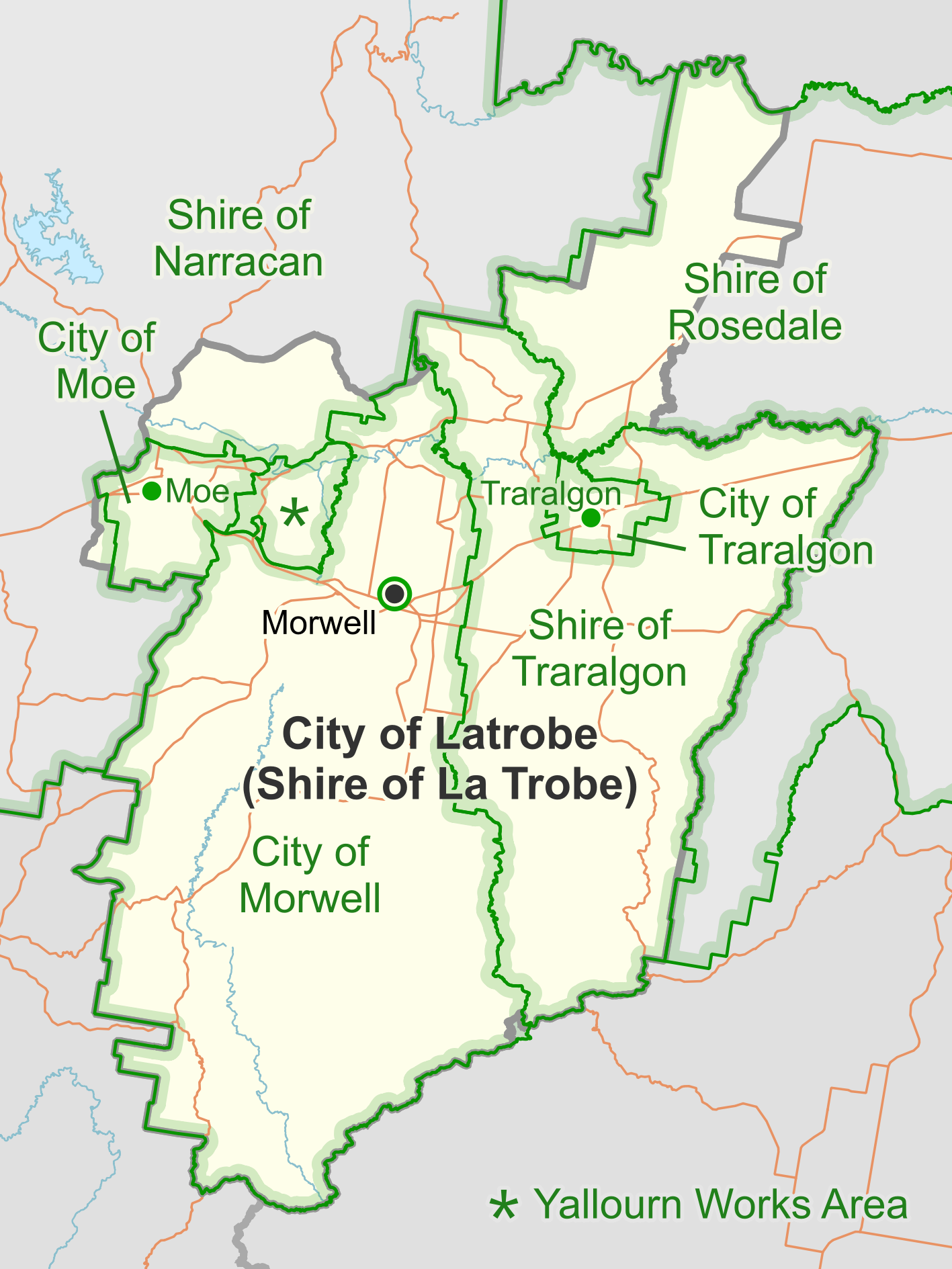
The city's predecessor LGAs (green) as they were in 1994. The administrative centres of the former LGAs are marked by green dots. 🞲 The Yallourn Works Area was added in 1996

When formed, the municipality was called the Shire of La Trobe, but on 6 April 2000, it adopted its current name.

== Industry and economy ==
The city has traditionally been recognised as the centre of Victoria's electricity industry, which is derived from one of the largest brown coal reserves in the world. It also the centre of a large forestry industry which services Australian Paper's pulp and paper mill (the largest in Australia) and other sawmills. Other industries in the area include food processing (Lion Foods – Morwell), engineering, post secondary education (Federation University Australia), and the service sector. Being the largest population centre in the Gippsland region, Latrobe acts as the regional headquarters for Government agencies and private operators including banks and insurance companies.

Latrobe is also close to popular tourist attractions including the Baw Baw and Tarra-Bulga National Parks and is the natural service centre to the historic gold mining town of Walhalla.

The power generators include:

- Loy Yang A & B Power Stations, Loy Yang
- Yallourn Power Station, Yallourn
- Jeeralang Power Station, Hazelwood North

Two power stations have closed in recent years, including International Power Hazelwood (2017), and EnergyBrix (Morwell) power station and briquette manufacturing facility (2014).

== Townships and localities ==
In the 2021 census, the city had a population of 77,318, up from 73,257 in the 2016 census.

Population
Locality	2016	2021
Balook^	4	9
Boolarra	973	1,023
Boolarra South	137	147
Budgeree	147	146
Callignee	319	391
Churchill	4,783	4,924
Cowwarr^	368	389
Darlimurla^	30	46
Delburn^	32	37
Driffield	85	101
Flynn^	180	188
Flynns Creek^	9	12
Glengarry^	1,084	1,113
Glengarry North	192	215
Glengarry West	122	155
Grand Ridge^	12	10
Hazelwood	184	189
Hazelwood North	1,478	1,552
Hazelwood South	297	289
Hernes Oak	327	365
Jeeralang	72	76
Jeeralang Junction	560	584
Jumbuk	31	42
Koornalla	98	89
Loy Yang	0	7
Maryvale	37	43
Mirboo^	290	334
Moe^	8,778	9,375
Moe South^	541	529
Morwell	13,771	14,389
Mount Tassie	0	0
Narracan^	253	262
Newborough	6,763	6,886
Tanjil South^	544	540
Toongabbie^	989	1,085
Traralgon	24,933	26,907
Traralgon East	1,726	1,780
Traralgon South	562	553
Tyers	824	893
Yallourn	144	143
Yallourn North^	1,545	1,511
Yinnar	907	1,021
Yinnar South	691	675

^ - Territory divided with another LGA

== Council ==
=== Current composition ===
The council is composed of four wards and nine councillors, with four councillors elected to represent the East Ward, two councillors per ward elected to represent each of the Central and West wards, and one councillor elected to represent the South Ward.

Ward	Councillor	Mayoral terms
Central	Graeme Middlemiss	Mayor (2003–2004, 2018–2019)
Central	Tracie Lund	
East	Dale Harriman	Mayor (2014–2015)
East	Dan Clancey	Mayor (2019–2020)
East	Kellie O'Callaghan	Mayor (2009–2010, 2016–2017, 2021-present)
East	Darren Howe	
South	Melissa Ferguson	
West	Bradley Law	
West	Sharon Gibson	Mayor (2013–2014, 2020–2021)

=== Administration and governance ===
The council meets in the council chambers at the council headquarters in the Morwell Municipal Offices, which is also the location of the council's administrative activities. It also provides customer services at both its administrative centre in Morwell, and its service centres in Moe and Traralgon.

== See also ==
- List of places on the Victorian Heritage Register in the City of Latrobe
