= Cathie Reid =

Australian businesswoman

Cathie Reid AM is an Australian businesswoman who was inducted into the Australian Businesswomen's Hall of Fame in 2015 and included in the Australian Financial Review Top 100 Women of Influence. In June 2019, Reid was honoured with a Member of the Order of Australia (AM) for her significant service to healthcare delivery and philanthropy.

A pharmacist by profession, Reid is the co-founder of Australia's Epic Group, including Epic Pharmacy; the Icon Group and the Epic Good Foundation. Reid and her husband, Stuart Giles, formed their family office Arc31 in June 2020 to manage their investments in a variety of portfolio companies and funds. In March 2022, Reid and Giles sold their shares in Icon Group.

Reid serves on the board of the Brisbane Lions AFL Club, ASX-listed AUCloud (as Chair).

Reid is one of Virgin Galactic’s future astronauts.

== Early life and education ==
Reid was raised in Morwell, a country town in the Latrobe Valley region of Gippsland, Victoria. She completed a Bachelor of Pharmacy at Monash University's Victorian College of Pharmacy in 1991.

== Career ==
In February 1998, Reid became the foundation pharmacy proprietor of the newly formed Active Care Pharmacy Group, providing pharmacy services to residential aged care homes. By the end of 1998, Reid and her husband, Stuart Giles, owned four pharmacies. Active Care ultimately became Australia's first multi-state pharmacy group, with pharmacies in Sydney, Brisbane, Melbourne and the Sunshine Coast.

In 2002, Active Care Pharmacy Hospital and Oncology merged with the APHS Group and Reid joined APHS General Management. By 2007, Reid took over responsibility for APHS's Aged Care Pharmacy Division and, by June 2010, Reid and Giles had bought out the APHS Group's remaining partners and assumed outright ownership of the corporation.

In January 2012, the APHS Group acquired a majority shareholding in Haematology and Oncology Clinics of Australia, creating Icon Cancer Care. The APHS Pharmacy Group was rebranded in 2014 as the Epic Pharmacy Group. Quadrant Private Equity acquired a majority stake in Icon Cancer Care in May 2014, launching an expansion program that included acquisition of Radiation Oncology Queensland, Slade Pharmacy and Epic Pharmacy to form Icon Consolidated Holdings Ltd (The Icon Group).

In October 2010, Reid launched a new manufacturing business, APHS Packaging offered automated packaging of patient medication into separate doses by date and time of day. The packaging system dovetailed with a Dutch developed product known as the Medido Monitored Compliance device which alerts patients when their medication is due to be taken and advises their carer if it is missed.

By 2012, APHS Packaging was producing 1.5 million sachets weekly for 17,000 consumers and 220 pharmacies nationally, and was acquired by multinational healthcare provider, the Symbion Group. The company received the National MedicineWise Award for Excellence in Labelling and Packaging and Reid was honoured with the National Commonwealth Bank Business Owner Award at the 2011 Telstra Business Women's Awards. APHS Packaging was rebranded as DoseAid in 2015.

Reid launched a new company – Epic Digital – focussed on creating healthcare-based technology solutions. The company joined the Microsoft Band Early Adopter Program to develop an application that overlays real-time data collected using Microsoft's Health Band with medical data available to health professionals. Epic Digital was acquired by the Icon Group in October 2016 and Reid was appointed Digital Advisor to the Icon Board.

In March 2015, Reid was inducted into the Australian Businesswomen's Network's Businesswomen's Hall of Fame.

In 2014, Reid and Giles invested $1.5million in Flamingo Customer Experience Inc., a software startup founded by Catriona Wallace. Reid was appointed to chair the Flamingo Board. By 2016, the company had established offices in Sydney and New York with customers including Nationwide Insurance, New York Daily Gazette, Prime Financial and Quay Credit Union. Flamingo was acquired by technology and software company, Cre8tek Ltd in June 2016 and Reid was appointed Cre8tek Chair in November 2016. When Cre8tek was listed on the Australian Securities Exchange, it became the second company in ASX history to list with a female CEO (Wallace) and Chair (Reid) combination.

In 2016, Reid was appointed director of UK-based Assured Digital Group (ADG) to guide their expansion into the global marketplace.

In December 2017, Reid was appointed as Chairperson of Australian cloud and cyber security provider AUCloud. AUCloud listed on the ASX in December 2020. NextDC became a significant investor in AUCloud in late 2021.

In July 2020, Reid and Giles announced the sale of their pharmacy interests.

Reid and her husband, Stuart Giles, formed their family office Arc31 in June 2020 to manage their investments in a variety of portfolio companies and funds.

== Philanthropy ==
Reid has been involved with a number of charitable causes, both professionally and personally.

Reid regularly participates in the Vinnies' CEO Sleepout which supports the St Vincent de Paul Society's work with people experiencing homelessness and, in 2014, she won the People's Choice Award in the inaugural Dancing CEOs event in Brisbane for raising the highest amount for the Women's Legal Service.

Following a visit to the Lockhart River Aboriginal community as part of Bond University's inaugural Yarning Up delegation, Reid and Giles donated $1 million to fund the Hawthorn Football Club's Indigenous Program over five years.

In 2015, Reid and Giles brought their portfolio of philanthropic activities together under the banner of the Epic Good Foundation. In 2023 the foundation was rebranded as the SpArc Foundation.

Since 2018, the SpArc Foundation (then Epic Good Foundation) has partnered with Outside the Locker Room, an organization that is involved in sporting club mental health education and support. In 2020, the SpArc Foundation announced a five-year partnership with the Brisbane Lions and OTLR to further support and promote OTLR’s programs across the Greater Brisbane Region.

== Awards and recognition ==
| 1998 | Victorian Pharmacy Manager of the Year – Australian Institute of Pharmacy Management |
| 2011 | National Commonwealth Bank Business Owner Award – 2011 Telstra Business Women's Awards |
| 2012 | Distinguished Alumni Professional Achievement Award – Monash University |
| 2013 | Top 100 Women of Influence – Australian Financial Review |
| 2015 | Business Women's Hall of Fame – Australian Business Women's Network |
| 2019 | Member of the Order of Australia |
