= Toongabbie, Victoria =

Toongabbie
- Town
- Coordinates: 38°03′0″S 146°37′0″E
- Country: Australia
- State: Victoria
- LGAs: City of Latrobe; Shire of Baw Baw
- Location: 177 km (110 mi) E of Melbourne; 21 km (13 mi) N of Traralgon; 13 km (8.1 mi) N of Glengarry
- Established: 1844

Government
  - State electorate: Morwell
  - Federal division: Gippsland

Population
  - Total: 500 (2016 census)
- Postcode: 3856

Toongabbie is a town in the City of Latrobe and Shire of Baw Baw, Victoria, Australia, 177 kilometres (110 mi) from Melbourne and just north of Traralgon. The railway station was closed in 1986 and the former railway line has now been incorporated into the Gippsland Plains Rail Trail. At the 2016 census, Toongabbie had a population of 500.

The main attraction in Toongabbie is the Ned Stringer Memorial located on Hower Street. Toongabbie Primary School opened in 1856 and the school is still open to date. The hotel in Toongabbie known as the club hotel closed down in 1913.

Toongabbie Post Office opened on 1 December 1865. Toongabbie had an Australian rules football club, which closed in 1999.

== History ==
Toongabbie was an important town that acted as a supply depot en route to the Walhalla Goldfields. Initially, goods were transported between Toongabbie and Walhalla by horse and as Walhalla boomed, Toongabbie's carrying industry boomed as well. With the advent of railways in the 1870s and 1880s transportation of goods into Toongabbie was mostly via train and then local carriers to Walhalla. Walhalla then decided that a railway direct to Walhalla was needed and it was decided that Moe would be the starting point. This was bad news for Toongabbie which over the coming years saw many local carriers selling their horses and the town returned to farming. Toongabbie did try to find alternative income sources in oil, marble and gold but these were not successful long term.

== Ned Stringer ==
There is a memorial for Ned Stringer on the corner of Hower and O’Meara St Toongabbie. Stringer discovered gold in 1862 in a creek which was later named Stringers Creek. This was an important gold discovery that started the gold rush at Walhalla.

== Toongabbie today ==
Toongabbie is approximately 2 hours east of Melbourne, nestled in the foothills of the Great Divide. The current population of Toongabbie is estimated at 1100. Toongabbie crosses over two shires - Latrobe City and Wellington Shire. Today, Toongabbie is a quiet town close to several business districts. Toongabbie has a Primary School and easy access to kindergartens, public and private schooling, in surrounding towns. There are numerous tourist attractions within and surrounding the Toongabbie township. Toongabbie is a peaceful town with many community and sporting groups, a wetlands, affordable properties, V/line bus and train connections from township and is one of the towns on the Gippsland Plains Rail Trail.

== Sporting and recreation ==
Sports and recreation in Toongabbie include; Toongabbie wetlands, Gippsland Plains Rail Trail, tennis club, Toongabbie Golf Course, Cricket Club, Badminton, Carpet Bowls, Toongabbie & District Pony Club, Toongabbie & District Horse Riders Club Inc and Aerobics & Weights training. Community Toongabbie boasts a strong community focus with groups including the Wellington/Latrobe Lions Club, Country Women's Association, Toongabbie Playgroup and singing group "Slightly Out of Toon". Halls and venues include the restored Toongabbie Mechanics Institute & Free Library, Toongabbie Recreation Hall and meeting room, golf club social rooms and cricket social rooms.
