= Banksieaeidites =

Scientific classification
- Kingdom: Plantae
- Clade: Tracheophytes
- Clade: Angiosperms
- Clade: Eudicots
- Order: Proteales
- Family: Proteaceae
- Subfamily: Grevilleoideae
- Tribe: Banksieae
- Genus: †Banksieaeidites; Cookson

Species
- See text

Genus of plants (fossil)

Banksieaeidites is a plant genus that encompasses fossil pollen that can be attributed to the Proteaceae tribe Banksieae, but cannot be attributed to a genus.

It was published in 1950 by Isabel Cookson and Suzanne Duigan, on the grounds that the two then-members of Banksieae, Banksia and Dryandra, cannot be distinguished by the pollen.

Since then, Banksia and Dryandra have been further grouped into subtribe Banksiinae, and another subtribe, Musgraveinae, erected to contain two new genera. The correct interpretation for Banksieaeidites does not appear to have been clarified since then, but treatment of the analogous genus for fossil leaves, Banksieaephyllum, is no longer consistent, with some botanists holding that it is still defined in terms of Banksieae, while others now treat it as defined in terms of Banksiinae. Dryandra has now been transferred into Banksia. Although as yet undetermined, the latter interpretation would result in Banksieaeidites becoming a nomenclatural synonym of Banksia.

Species include:

- Banksieaeidites arcuatus
- Banksieaeidites elongatus
- Banksieaeidites minimus

== See also ==
- Banksieaephyllum, a genus for specimens of organically preserved fossil leaves that can be attributed to subtribe Banksiinae, but not to a genus.
- Banksieaeformis, a genus for fossil leaves with the same architecture as Banksieaephyllum, but without organic detail; like Banksieaephyllum, these can be attributed to subtribe Banksiinae, but not to a genus.
