= Banksieaephyllum =

Banksieaephyllum Temporal range: Paleocene–Early Miocene

Scientific classification
- Kingdom: Plantae
- Clade: Embryophytes
- Clade: Tracheophytes
- Clade: Spermatophytes
- Clade: Angiosperms
- Clade: Eudicots
- Order: Proteales
- Family: Proteaceae
- Subfamily: Grevilleoideae
- Tribe: Banksieae
- Genus: †Banksieaephyllum; Cookson & Duigan

Species
- See text

Genus of plants (fossil)

Banksieaephyllum is a plant genus that encompasses organically preserved fossil leaves that can be attributed to the Proteaceae tribe Banksieae, but cannot be attributed to a genus.

Before 1950, many fossil leaves were attributed to the genera Banksia and Dryandra. In most cases, leaves with triangular lobes were associated with Dryandra, and leaves with serration were associated with Banksia. In 1950, Isabel Cookson and Suzanne Duigan showed this policy to be flawed, by demonstrating that the leaves of the two genera cannot be reliably distinguished. Since these two genera then comprised tribe Banksieae, Cookson and Duigan erected Banksieaephyllum to contain such leaves.

Since then, Banksia and Dryandra have been further grouped into subtribe Banksiinae, and another subtribe, Musgraveinae, erected to contain two new genera. Interpretations of Banksieaephyllum are now no longer consistent. Some botanists continue to hold that Banksieaephyllum is for fossil leaves that can be attributed to Banksieae but not to a genus; that is, they include fossils that cannot be excluded from the Musgravinae. Others hold that Cookson and Duigan's intentions were for the genus to hold fossil leaves that are known to be Dryandra or Banksia, but cannot be attributed to either with certainty; thus they now define the genus in terms of Banksiinae rather than Banksieae.

Dryandra has now been transferred into Banksia. Although as yet undetermined, the latter interpretation would result in Banksieaephyllum becoming a nomenclatural synonym of Banksia.

Fossils ascribed to Banksieaephyllum have been found in sediments dating from the Paleocene to early Miocene (66 to 16 million years ago). In 1998, the most recent synopsis, there were 16 species, including:

- Banksieaephyllum acuminatum Oligocene, Latrobe Valley, Victoria.
- Banksieaephyllum angustum Latrobe Valley - has long narrow leaves resembling Banksia candolleana or B. formosa.
- Banksieaephyllum attenuatum - possibly not a member of proteaceae.
- Banksieaephyllum cuneatum Early Eocene (Deans Marsh and Anglesea, Victoria) and Middle Eocene (Golden Grove); may be more closely related to Musgravea.
- Banksieaephyllum elongatus Late Oligocene - Early Miocene, Loy Yang, Victoria.
- Banksieaephyllum fastigatum Oligocene, Yallourn, Victoria.
- Banksieaephyllum incisum
- Banksieaephyllum linearis Early Oligocene, Lake Cethana, Tasmania. Leaves up to 5.5 cm long and 6 mm wide, resembling Banksia spinulosa in appearance but has some cellular characteristics of Musgravea.
- Banksieaephyllum longifolium
- Banksieaephyllum obovatum
- Banksieaephyllum orientalis Early Oligocene, Lake Cethana, Tasmania.
- Banksieaephyllum pinnatum Oligocene, Pioneer Tasmania
- Banksieaephyllum praefastigatum Late Paleocene, Cambalong Creek (near Bombala), southern New South Wales.
- Banksieaephyllum regularis - possibly not a member of proteaceae.
- Banksieaephyllum taylorii Late Palaeocene, Lake Bungarby, southeastern New South Wales.
- Banksieaephyllum urnifome Late Oligocene - Early Miocene, Morwell, Victoria
- Banksieaephyllum westdaliense

However, Carpenter, Jordan & Hill (2016) transferred the species B. incisum and B. cuneatum to the separate genus Banksieaefolia, while also transferring the species B. acuminatum to the genus Banksia and renaming it Banksia cooksoniae. In addition, the authors excluded the species B. attenuatum, B. longifolium, B. pinnatum, B. praefastigatum, B. regularis and B. westdaliense from Banksieae and transferred those species to the separate genus Pseudobanksia.

== See also ==
- Banksieaeformis, a genus for fossil leaves with the same architecture as Banksieaephyllum, but without organic detail; like Banksieaephyllum, these can be attributed to tribe Banksieae, but not to a genus.
- Banksieaeidites, a genus for fossil pollen specimens that can be attributed to tribe Banksieae, but not to a genus.
