= Yallourn North =

- Town
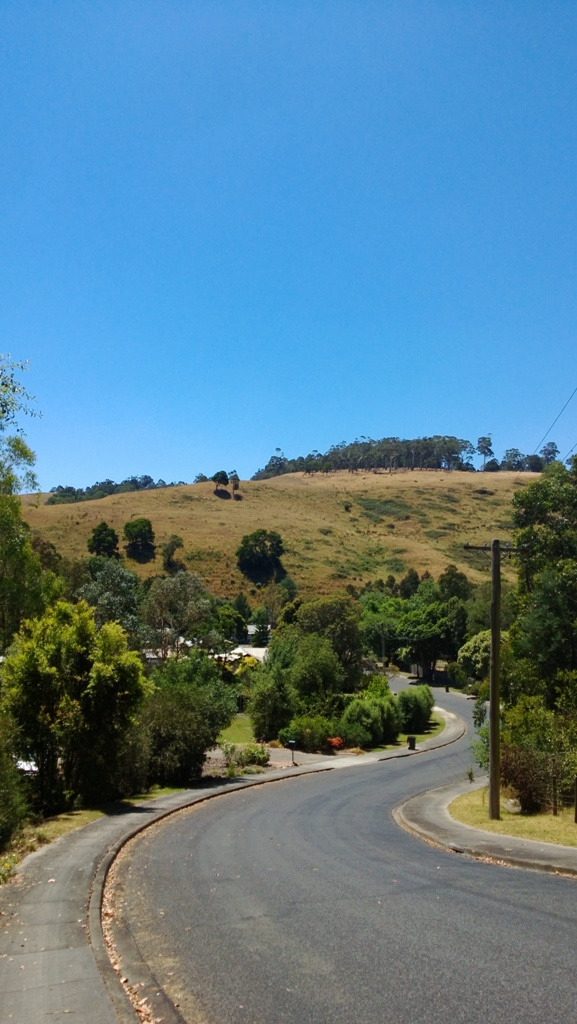
- Homes on the undulating street of Marshall Street with a view of Harmony Hills in the background.

- Coordinates: 38°10′S 146°22′E
- Country: Australia
- State: Victoria
- LGAs: City of Latrobe; Shire of Baw Baw
- Location: 152 km (94 mi) E of Melbourne; 18 km (11 mi) NE of Moe; 15 km (9.3 mi) N of Morwell
- Established: 1917

Government
  - State electorate: Morwell
  - Federal divisions: Gippsland; Monash
- Elevation: 154 m (505 ft)

Population
  - Total: 1,545 (2016 census)
- Postcode: 3825
- Mean max temp: 18.2 °C (64.8 °F)
- Mean min temp: 8.9 °C (48.0 °F)
- Annual rainfall: 889.6 mm (35.02 in)
- Website: Yallourn North
Localities around Yallourn North
Tanjil South	Moondarra	Tyers
Tanjil South	Yallourn North	Traralgon
Hernes Oak	Morwell	Morwell

Yallourn North is a town in the City of Latrobe, Victoria, Australia. It is approximately eight kilometres north-east of Moe, and 146 kilometres south-east of Melbourne. Prior to 1947 Yallourn North was known as "Brown Coal Mine".

The Post Office opened on 3 September 1917 as Brown Coal Mine and was renamed Yallourn North in 1947.

This tiny hilltop town contains many churches, including the only Serbian Orthodox Church and Mosque in the region. Sports available are Australian rules football, cricket, lawn bowls and carpet bowls, netball and angling. There is a Social Golf Club, and pistol club. The town has an Australian Rules football team, Yallourn-Yallourn North, which competes in the North Gippsland Football League.

== History ==
=== The beginning of a town ===
Yallourn North owes its origins to the discovery of brown coal in the Morwell area of Gippsland, in eastern Victoria. Initially private enterprise unsuccessfully attempted to profit from the large quantity of coal that was accessible close to the surface. The Victorian Mines Department took over the abandoned mine in 1917, after protracted strikes by coal miners in New South Wales threatened Victoria's electricity Supply.

=== Educating the children ===
In 1917 the need for a school became evident. W. H. Dooley reported that a school should be formed, but not a costly one. The address of the school was given as "Great Morwell Coal Mine" and a large marquee was initially used as the school building. The school was allocated the temporary number 3967, which is still in use today. After a tear in the marquee during a storm in December 1918, the school was temporarily relocated to Bevis's Pioneer Boarding House until a new structure could be built on the old site. Over the years demand grew, as did the space required. The current school building was constructed in the late 1960s.

=== Wartime ===
During the Second World War, an area within a radius of 5 miles (8 km) from the open cut mine was designated as a Prohibited Area for aircraft. Anti-aircraft defences were erected in late 1941, with the placement of four static Bofors guns to help protect the mine and State Electricity Commission of Victoria (SECV) infrastructure. Each group of four Bofors guns needed 90 people to operate them, but neither the Australian Army nor the Volunteer Defence Corps could find enough available operators. The location of the Bofors guns was approximately between Boundary Road and Anderson Avenue.

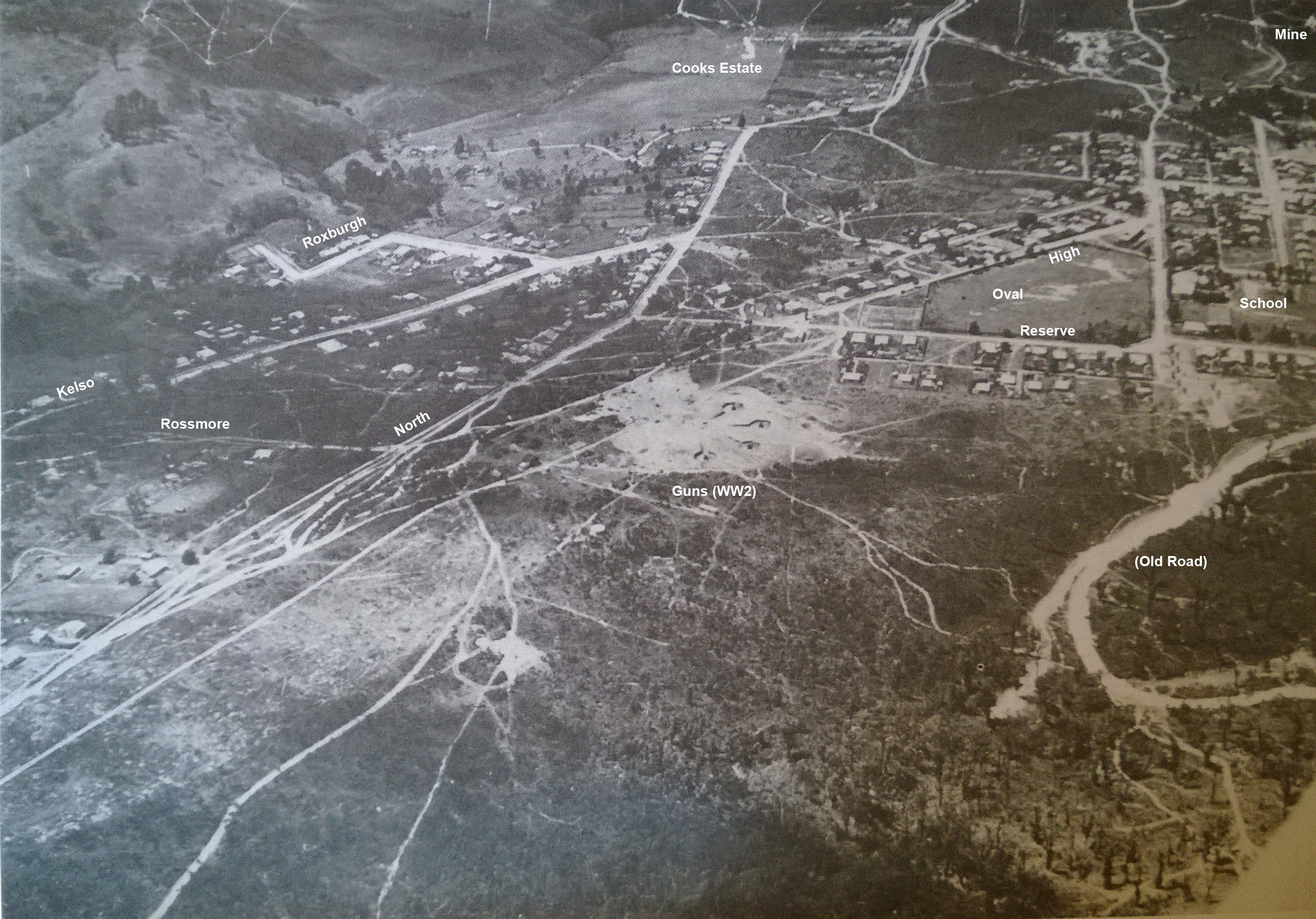
Static 3.7 inch Bofors guns at the Brown Coal Mine.

=== The Big Slip ===
The township underwent a massive transformation after 1950. On 29 June 1950, thirty people narrowly escaped death as 250,000 long tons (250,000 t) of earth and brown coal slid 300 feet (90 m) into the old open cut. After the slip, a number of owners moved their shops to where they are today, which is the reason why shops at Yallourn North aren't in one central location. The eastern half of town was redesigned, with the addition of streets such as Gooding Street, Low Road, and East Street.

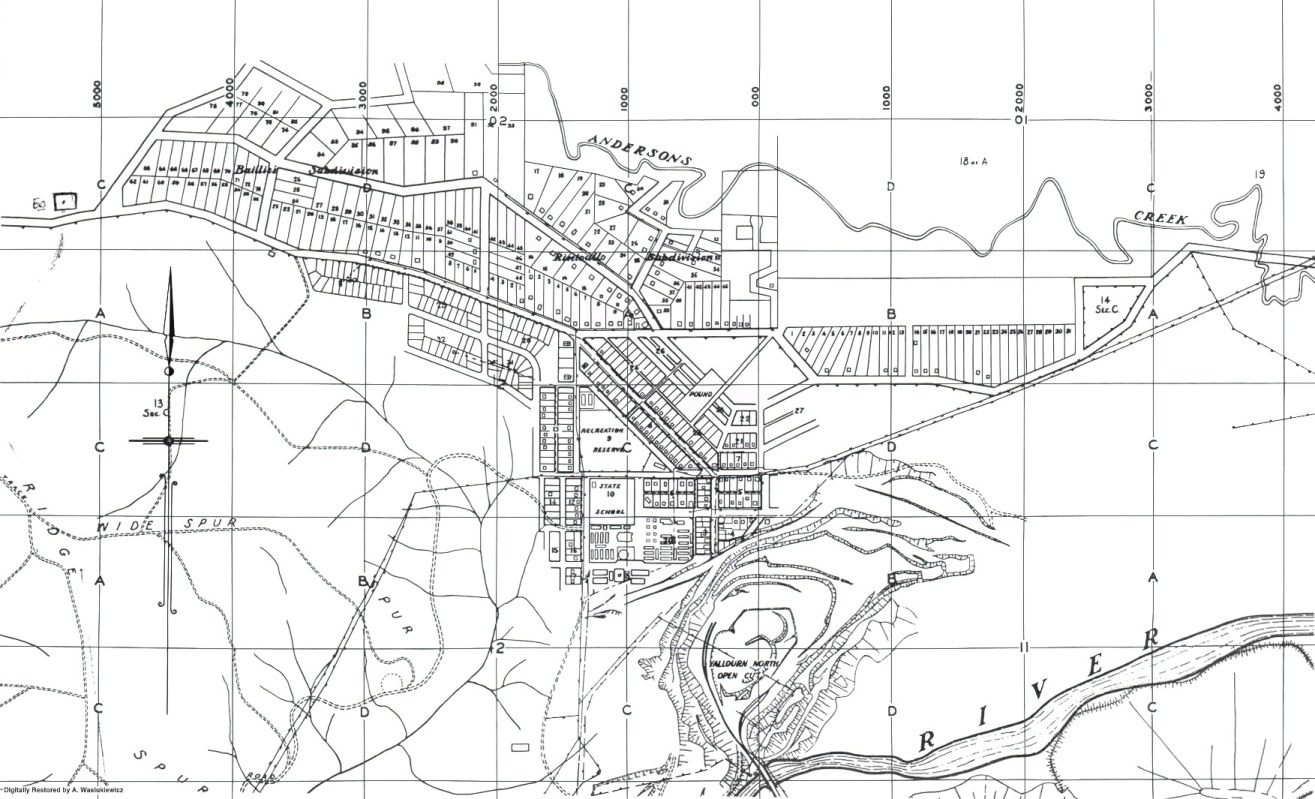
The map layout of the Brown Coal Mine before the Big Slip in 1950

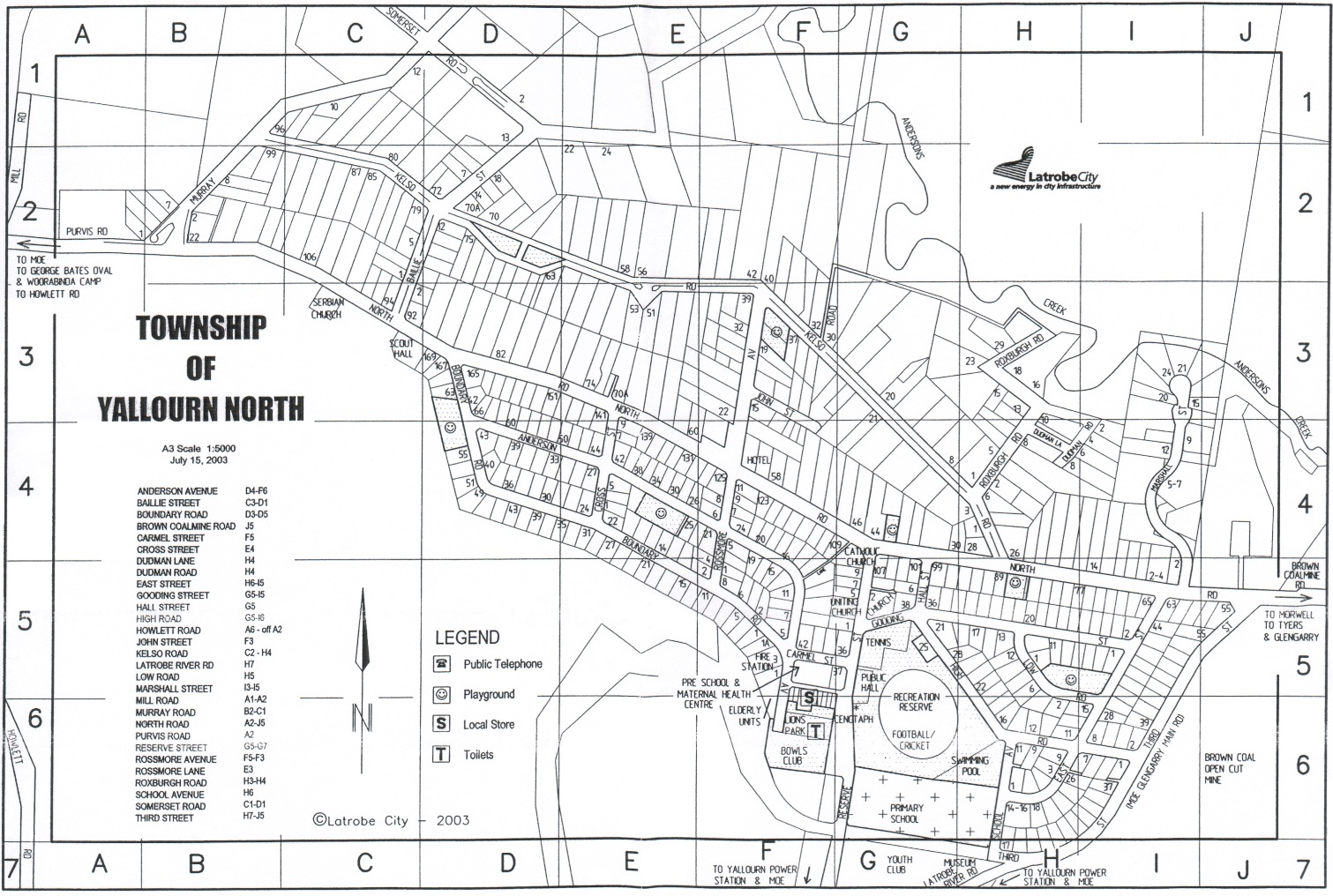
The township as it exists today

=== Privatisation of the SECV ===
After the Kennett Government privatised and sold the SECV in 1994, Yallourn North was significantly affected economically. Many people moved away from the area in search of work elsewhere, following the loss of 4,500 jobs (out of 10,000) in the greater Latrobe Valley during the three years to 1993. However, over the last 20 years the town has undergone a resurgence, with the economy of Latrobe City now finding its feet, and new families moving in to replace those of old.

== Monash Hall ==
=== History ===
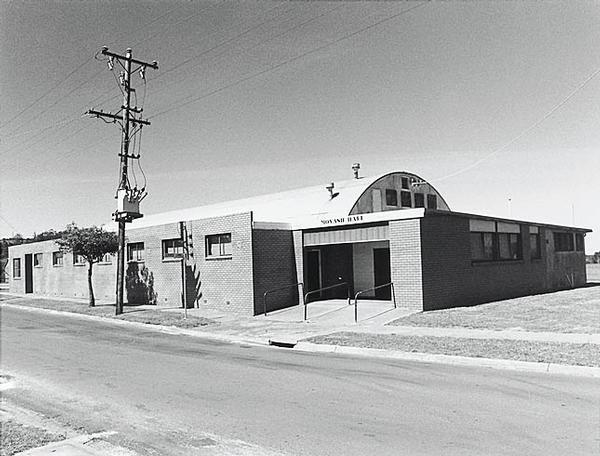
Monash Hall, Reserve St, circa 1980.

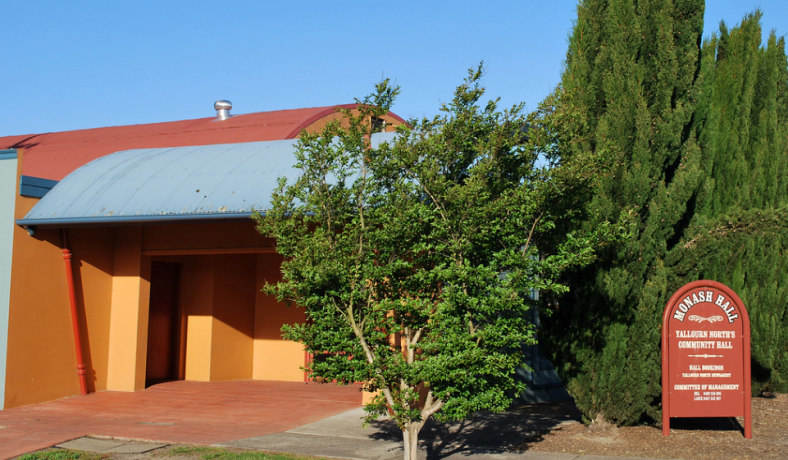
Monash Hall, Reserve St, 2012.

After the Big Slip of 1950, the town's shops temporarily moved into the camp recreation building while a new building was sourced. A Nissen hut was brought in pieces from an SECV work yard on trucks, and erected in Reserve Street. Purvis's, Dobinsons Drapery, Meadows Bakery and a hairdresser moved to the hut. The businesses moved out in turn as they each gained their own new locations. Ernie Pincini from Mirboo North then transformed the Nissen hut into a picture theatre. It was supposed to open in November 1955 but given post-war work shortages and huge labour demand elsewhere, it didn't open until June 1961, not long before the first television transmission to the area by GLV-10, which quickly saw the picture theatre's demise.

After 1962 the hall was re-opened as a public facility. Also known as Yallourn North Hall, the name Monash Hall adorns the building today. In the 1990s the hall received a minor facelift and coat of paint, and was further improved in 2008, with an upgrade to the kitchen.

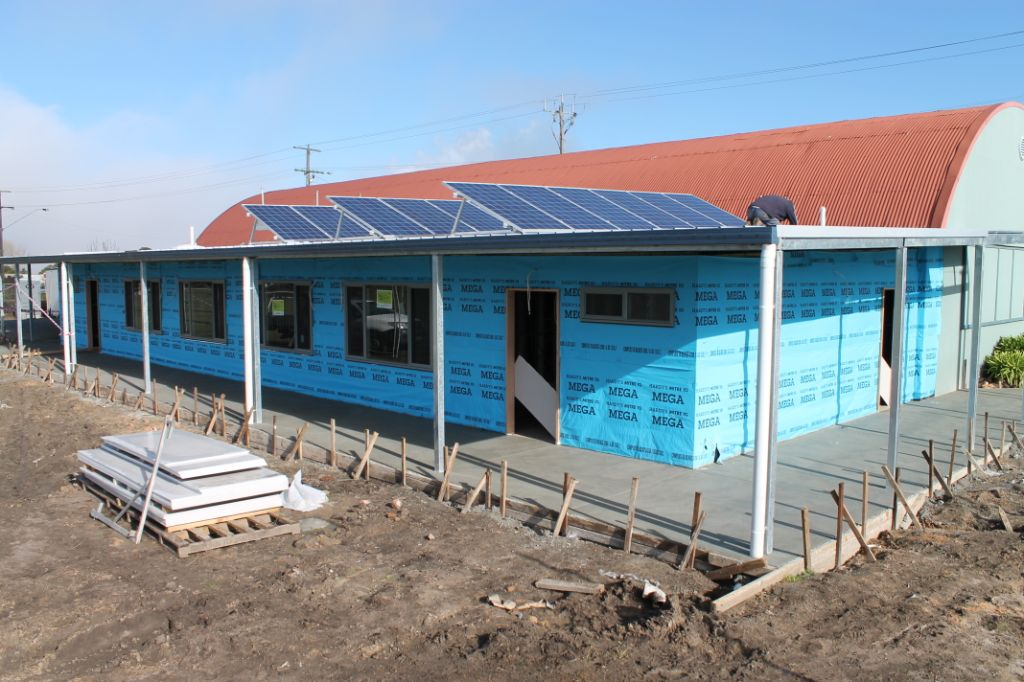
Monash Hall Clubrooms during construction, 2013.

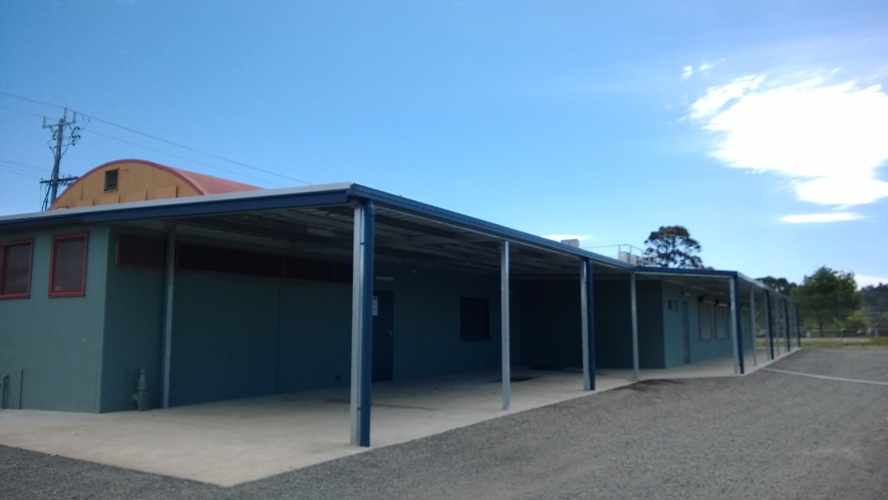
The completed clubrooms prior to the official opening.

=== Present day ===
In October 2013 the regional growth fund assisted in the completion of a $680,000 redevelopment of the hall. The local cricket club, and junior football club agreed to merge their facilities under the one roof at the hall. Eight months of renovations took place resulting in a brand-new multi-purpose commercial kitchen, new club rooms and toilet facilities, as well as extra meeting rooms and wheelchair facilities. It was officially opened by mayor Sandy Cam on 15 October 2013. As well as the sporting groups, common users of the hall include Moartz, Line Dancers, Yallourn North Action Group, and Yallourn North Primary School. It has also held other events recently such as ballet classes and hosted a primary school in the emergency following a fire in the Hazelwood open cut mine.

== Climate ==
Yallourn North possesses an oceanic climate (Köppen: Cfb); experiencing warm summers and cool winters. Average maxima vary from 25.0 °C (77.0 °F) in February to 11.8 °C (53.2 °F) in July, while average minima fluctuate between 13.2 °C (55.8 °F) in February and 4.6 °C (40.3 °F) in July. Precipitation is moderate, averaging 889.6 mm (35.02 in) per annum. However, rainfall is frequent: spread across 175.5 precipitation days, mostly from troughs or cold fronts associated with westerlies originating from the Southern Ocean. The town is not sunny, experiencing 182.8 cloudy days and only 47.0 clear days per annum. Extreme temperatures have ranged from 43.0 °C (109.4 °F) on 24 January 1982 to −2.8 °C (27.0 °F) on 6 August 1974. All climate data was sourced from Yallourn, a former company town located 9.8 km (6.1 mi) south of Yallourn North.

Climate data for Yallourn SEC (38.19°S 146.33°E) (154 m (505 ft) AMSL) (1949-1994)
Month	Jan	Feb	Mar	Apr	May	Jun	Jul	Aug	Sep	Oct	Nov	Dec	Year
Record high °C (°F)	43.0 (109.4)	41.4 (106.5)	38.2 (100.8)	32.0 (89.6)	25.6 (78.1)	20.7 (69.3)	21.8 (71.2)	23.7 (74.7)	29.5 (85.1)	31.7 (89.1)	35.6 (96.1)	38.2 (100.8)	43.0 (109.4)
Mean daily maximum °C (°F)	24.7 (76.5)	25.0 (77.0)	22.5 (72.5)	18.7 (65.7)	14.9 (58.8)	12.5 (54.5)	11.8 (53.2)	13.2 (55.8)	15.1 (59.2)	17.1 (62.8)	19.9 (67.8)	22.3 (72.1)	18.1 (64.7)
Mean daily minimum °C (°F)	12.7 (54.9)	13.2 (55.8)	12.1 (53.8)	9.7 (49.5)	7.4 (45.3)	5.6 (42.1)	4.6 (40.3)	5.4 (41.7)	6.6 (43.9)	8.3 (46.9)	9.8 (49.6)	11.4 (52.5)	8.9 (48.0)
Record low °C (°F)	3.6 (38.5)	4.2 (39.6)	4.7 (40.5)	1.7 (35.1)	0.3 (32.5)	−1.9 (28.6)	−1.8 (28.8)	−2.8 (27.0)	−0.6 (30.9)	0.4 (32.7)	2.0 (35.6)	4.8 (40.6)	−2.8 (27.0)
Average precipitation mm (inches)	51.0 (2.01)	49.3 (1.94)	60.0 (2.36)	65.5 (2.58)	87.6 (3.45)	78.5 (3.09)	83.1 (3.27)	90.4 (3.56)	88.9 (3.50)	84.9 (3.34)	81.3 (3.20)	70.8 (2.79)	889.6 (35.02)
Average precipitation days (≥ 0.2 mm)	9.4	8.4	11.0	13.1	17.4	17.8	18.6	19.7	16.4	16.3	14.5	12.9	175.5
Average afternoon relative humidity (%)	48	49	54	59	68	72	70	65	62	60	56	53	60
Average dew point °C (°F)	10.8 (51.4)	11.3 (52.3)	10.8 (51.4)	9.1 (48.4)	7.9 (46.2)	6.5 (43.7)	5.4 (41.7)	5.5 (41.9)	6.3 (43.3)	7.9 (46.2)	9.1 (48.4)	10.1 (50.2)	8.4 (47.1)
Mean monthly sunshine hours	260.4	223.2	198.4	165.0	127.1	96.0	117.8	145.7	170.5	198.4	210.0	235.6	2,148.1
Percentage possible sunshine	58	58	52	50	41	34	39	44	46	49	49	51	48
Source: Bureau of Meteorology (1949-1994)

== Places of worship ==
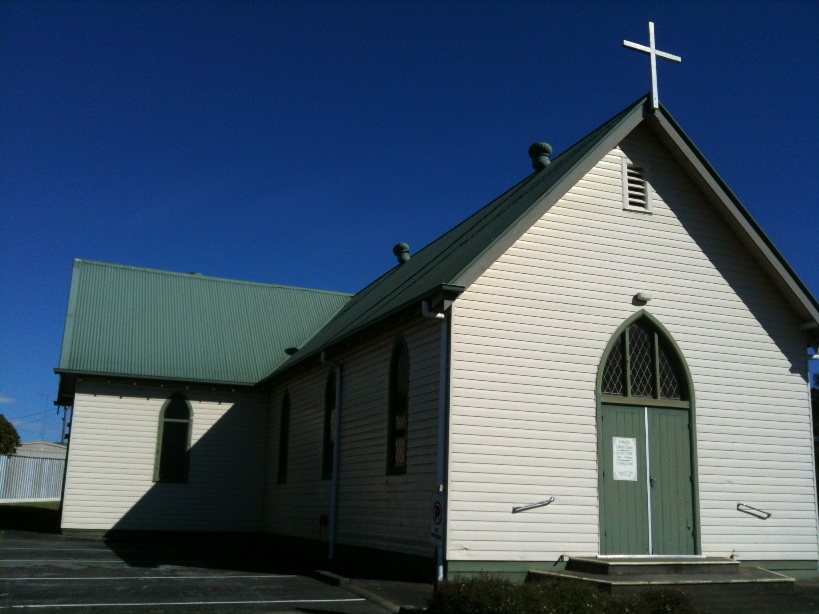
St Brigid's Catholic Church

=== St. Brigid's Catholic Church ===
In 1933 work on building St. Brigid's commenced, on land donated by the SECV, on the corner of North Road and Reserve Street. It was officially opened and blessed on 1 March 1936 by Bishop Ryan, assisted by Father Nolan, and the first mass was celebrated that same day. Under Father Walsh, the church was enlarged in 1950 by the addition of the T-shaped part at the rear. The original building was lifted and moved at an angle to accommodate the extension on the same block. A few of the parishioners collected money via door knocking to raise extra funds for the work. In December 1979 the house next door became the official Presbytery and was blessed in a ceremony conducted by Bishop Fox. No longer used as a Presbytery, it is once more a private home.

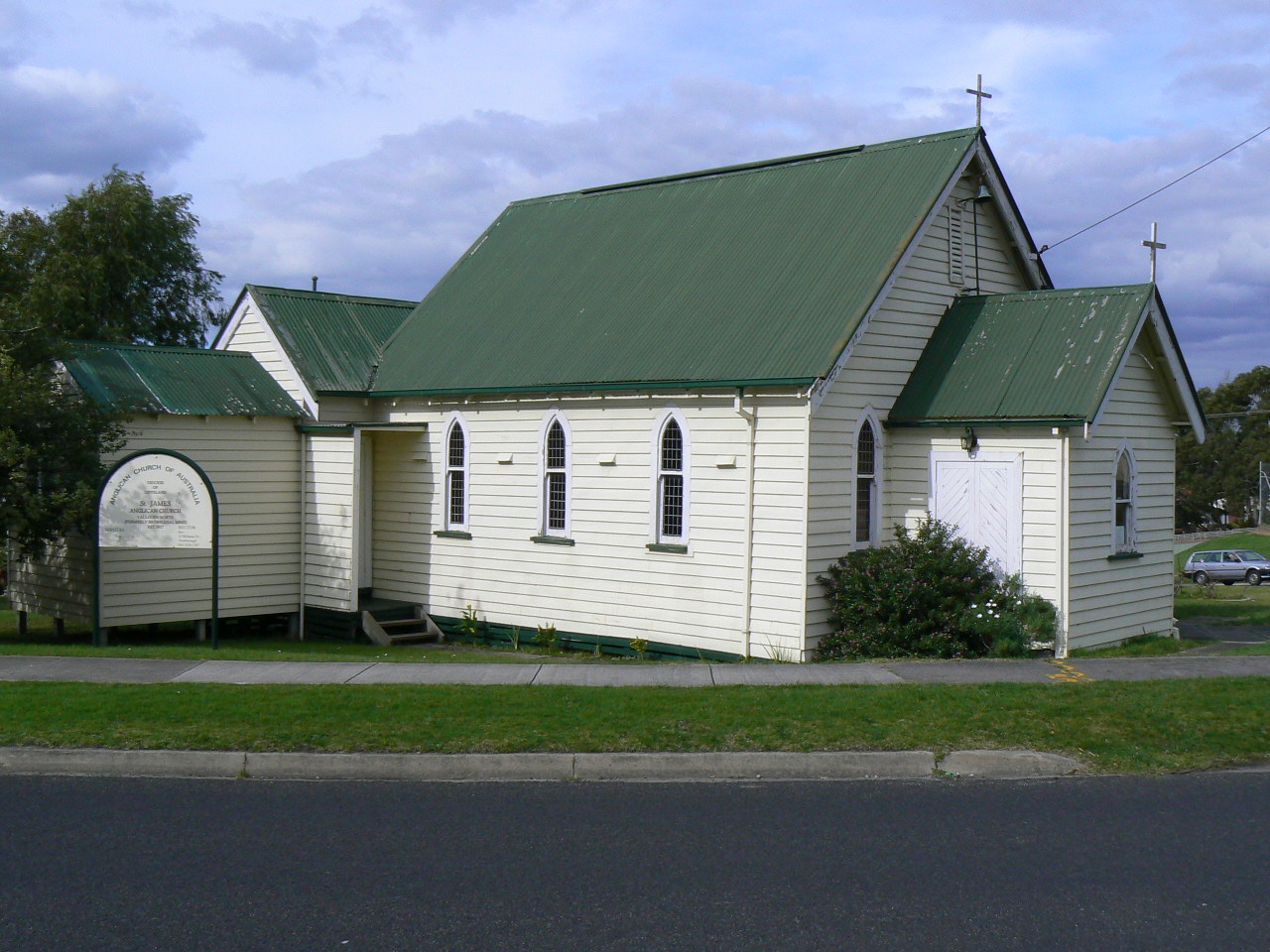
St. James Church, on the corner of Reserve and Gooding streets.

=== The Church of England ===
St.James's was built on "the hill", on a site in Reserve Street, and was dedicated on 17 November 1927. When the little town of Morwell Bridge had to go because of the expanding Yallourn coal mine, the Church of England building was shifted to Brown Coal Mine to be used as a hall. On the eve of its removal it was set alight and required considerable repair. It served the township for a time and was later removed altogether. The first clergyman was the Reverend Vizard who was sent from Walhalla to the Brown Coal Mine in 1920.

=== The Methodist Church ===
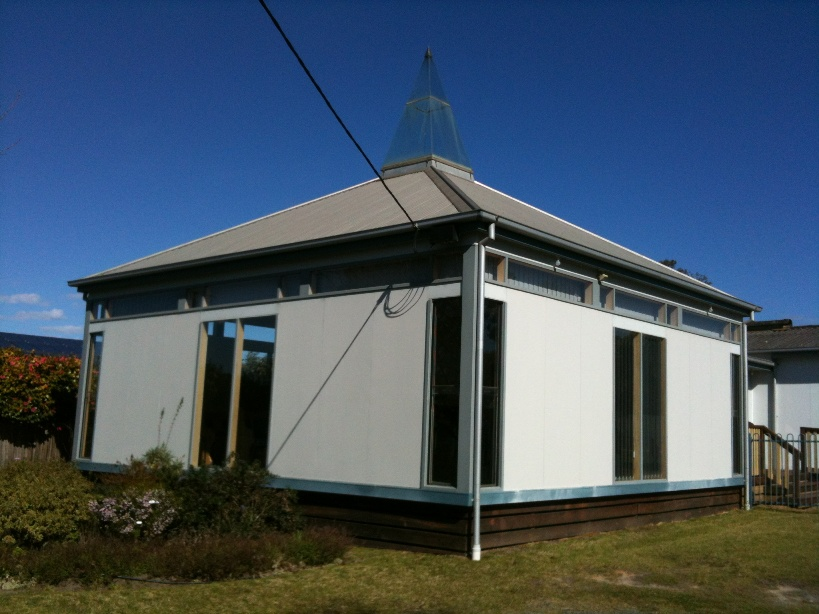
Uniting Church rebuilt after fire.

Brown Coal Mine and Yallourn were at first attached to the Morwell circuit and the Superintendent Minister was the Reverend A.G.Day. Before Yallourn was built he conducted services at the school in Brown Coal Mine. In 1923 a Methodist probationer, Reverend E.L.Vercoe, was appointed to the area and was given accommodation in the Eastern Camp. Services were conducted in the camps, homes and the school buildings.

Reverend Vercoe purchased a mess room in the 1920s and had it erected at Brown Coal Mine on a site not far from the old Main Street. Voluntary workers altered the windows to make them look more like a church, and a vestry was added. The church was moved to Reserve Street in 1938, by a bullock team. The main building was extended and a larger vestry and a new porch were added, and a stained glass window was fitted. Some years later, what once had been an ablutions block was added to the rear of the church. It was restored to become an all-purpose room, which still serves the community today.

In 1977, the Methodist Church Australia-wide combined with the Presbyterian and Congregational Churches to become the Uniting Church in Australia. In the early hours of Boxing Day 1997 the church was badly damaged by fire, and only the community hall at the rear was saved. The church was demolished and a new modern building was constructed on the same site. A Service of Celebration for the opening of the new building was held on 2 April 2000.

=== Holy Trinity Serbian Orthodox Parish and church community ===
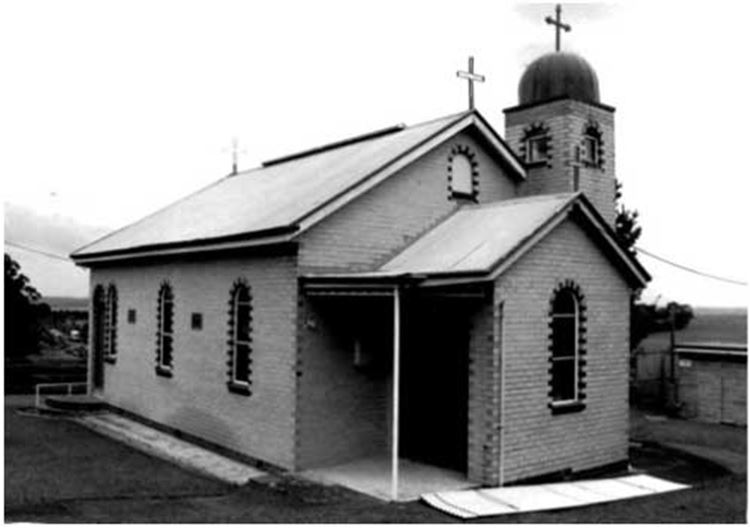
The initial Holy Trinity Serbian Orthodox Church, circa 1980.

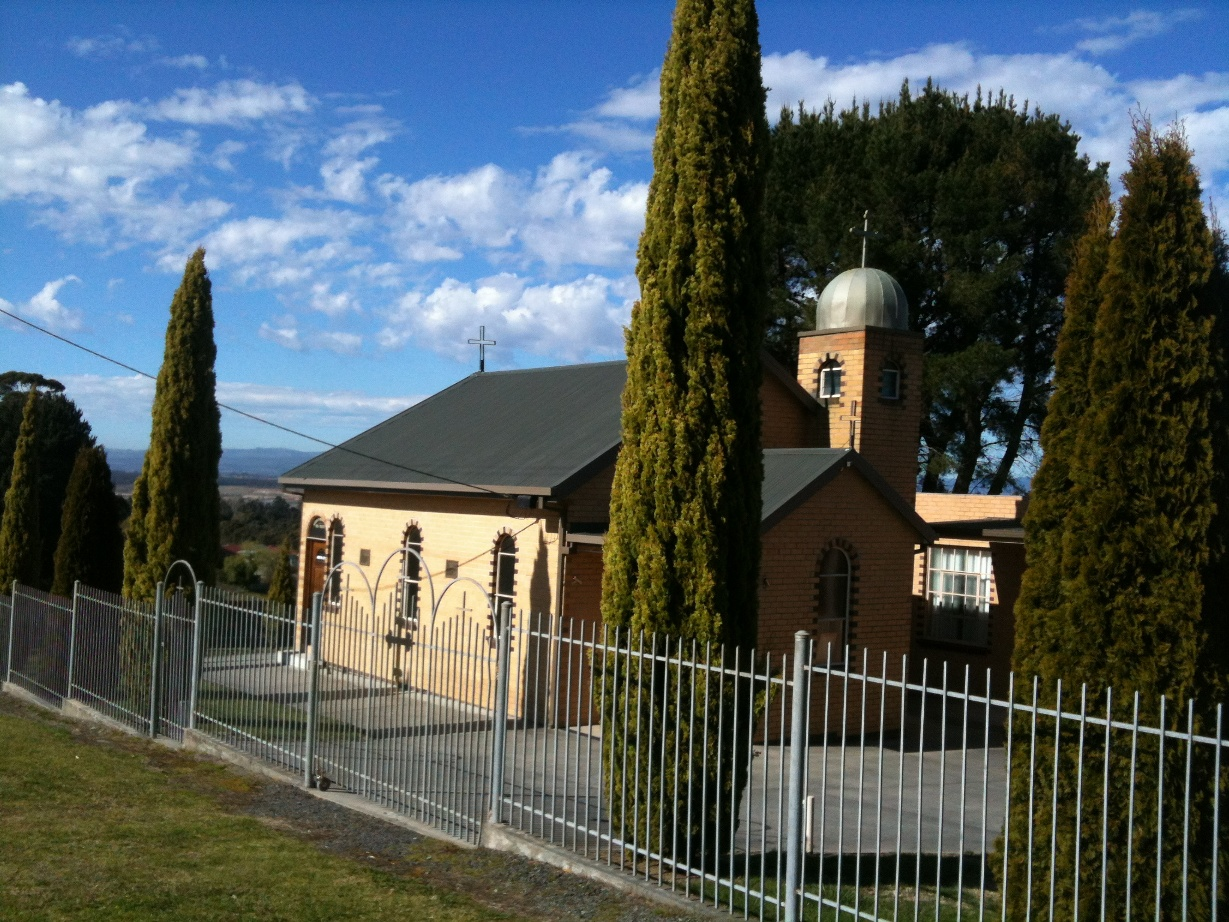
The Holy Trinity Serbian Orthodox Church today, September 2012

In 1950 a number of Orthodox Serbs came to live in Yallourn and soon wished to establish a Serbian Orthodox Church. On 8 June 1952 the Serbs of Yallourn and surrounding towns convened a general meeting at which the decision was made to establish a church and parish. The following year, Father Theodore Demjanjuk, a Russian by background, was appointed as the first parish priest, and services were initially held in the Anglican church. In 1957 land was obtained from the SECV for the building of the new church on North Road. Consequently, the church hall was built and consecrated in 1975 by Bishop Dimitrije. It has since been widened so that it can hold about 250 people. After Father Theodore, numerous priests served in the parish, while currently the parish priest is Father Milan Milutinovic who holds monthly services. It is the only Serbian Orthodox church in the region.

== Yallourn North today ==
Yallourn North is still a small and quiet town, but is undergoing continual change. At the 2011 census, Yallourn North had a population of 1,493. The town historically has a higher percentage of older residents, but many of them are moving into more suitable accommodation, allowing new families to move in. A few new dwellings have been built, along with a rural subdivision outside the township to the east.

There is a modestly-sized FoodWorks supermarket that services many of the residents' needs. Larger supermarkets, such as Coles, Woolworths and Aldi, are in neighbouring towns within driving distance. Other shops within the town include a fish and chip shop, Sheek Hairdressing, Central Gippsland Family Practice Medical Centre, an op-shop and also the Rossmore Hotel].

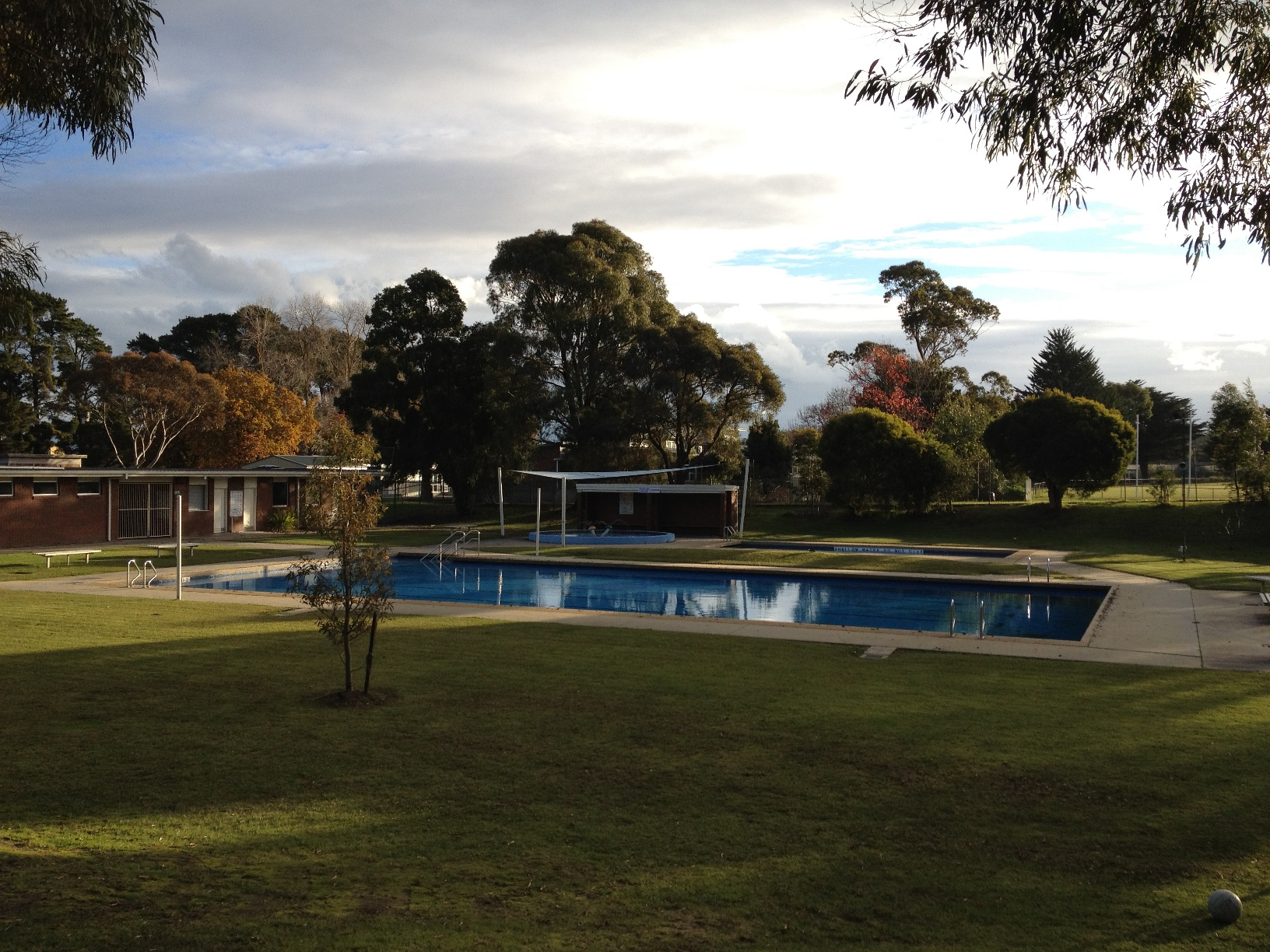
Swimming pools of three different sizes, all solar heated.

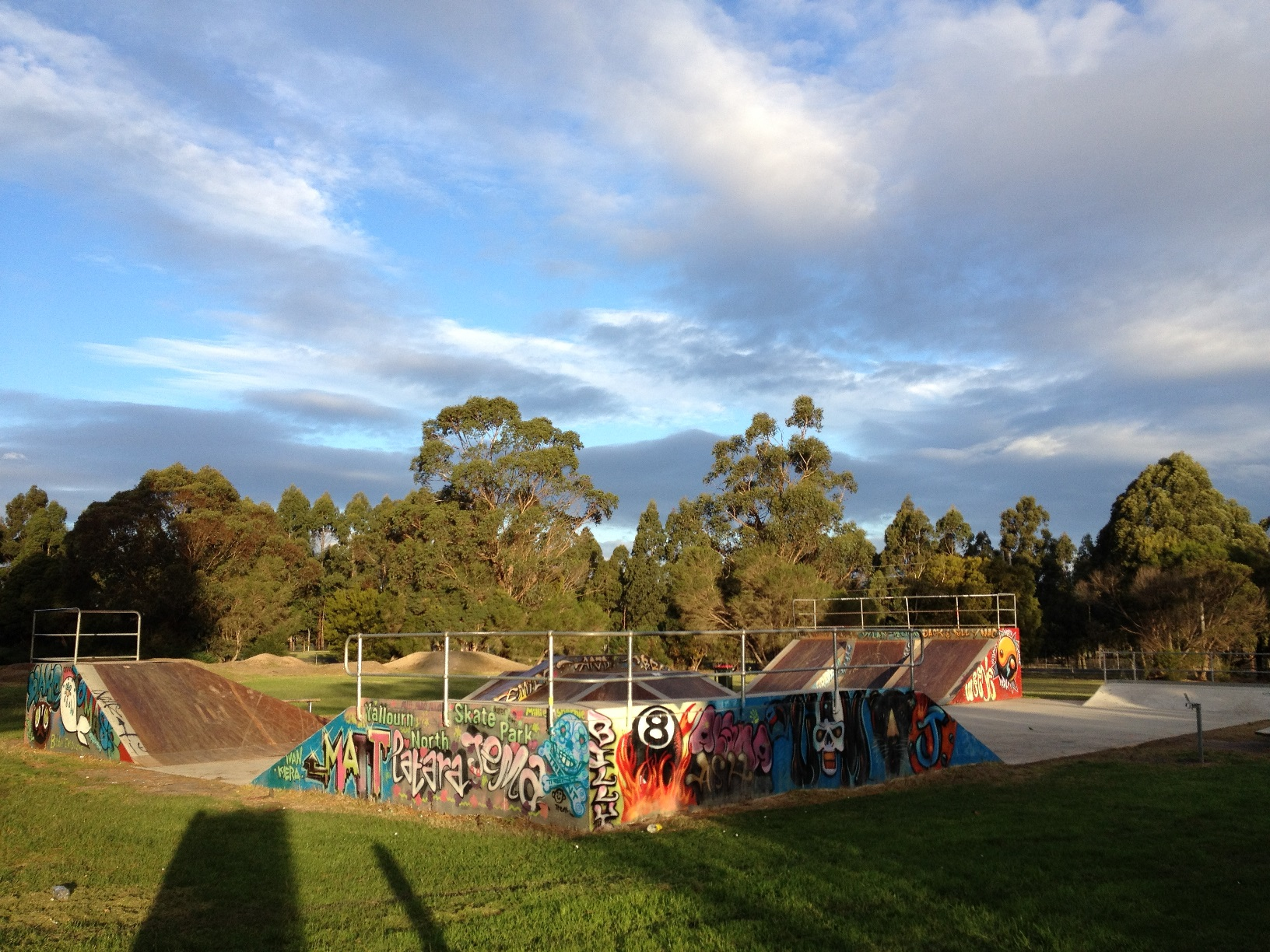
Skate park, Reserve Street.

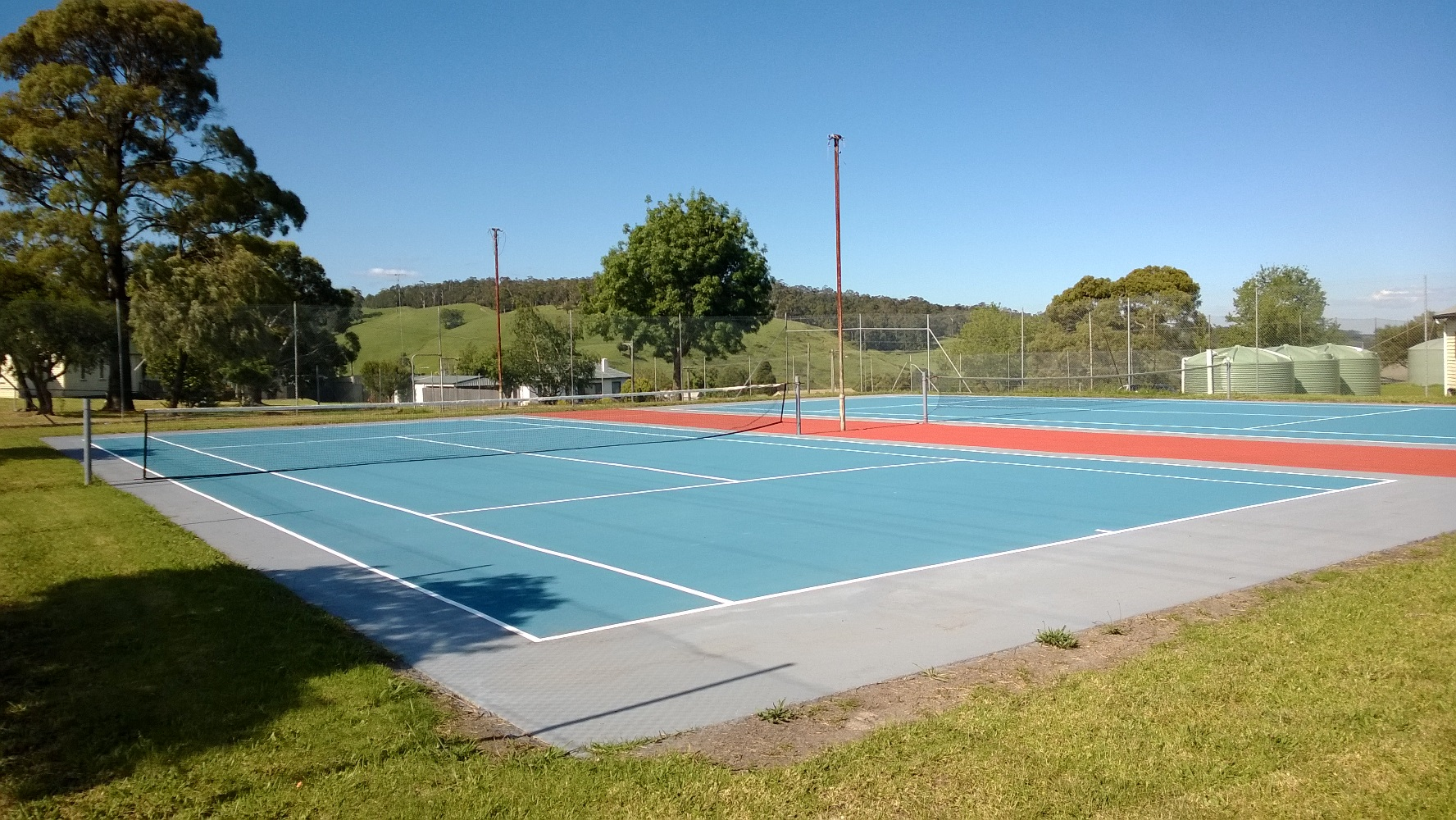
Recently resurfaced tennis courts, Reserve Street.

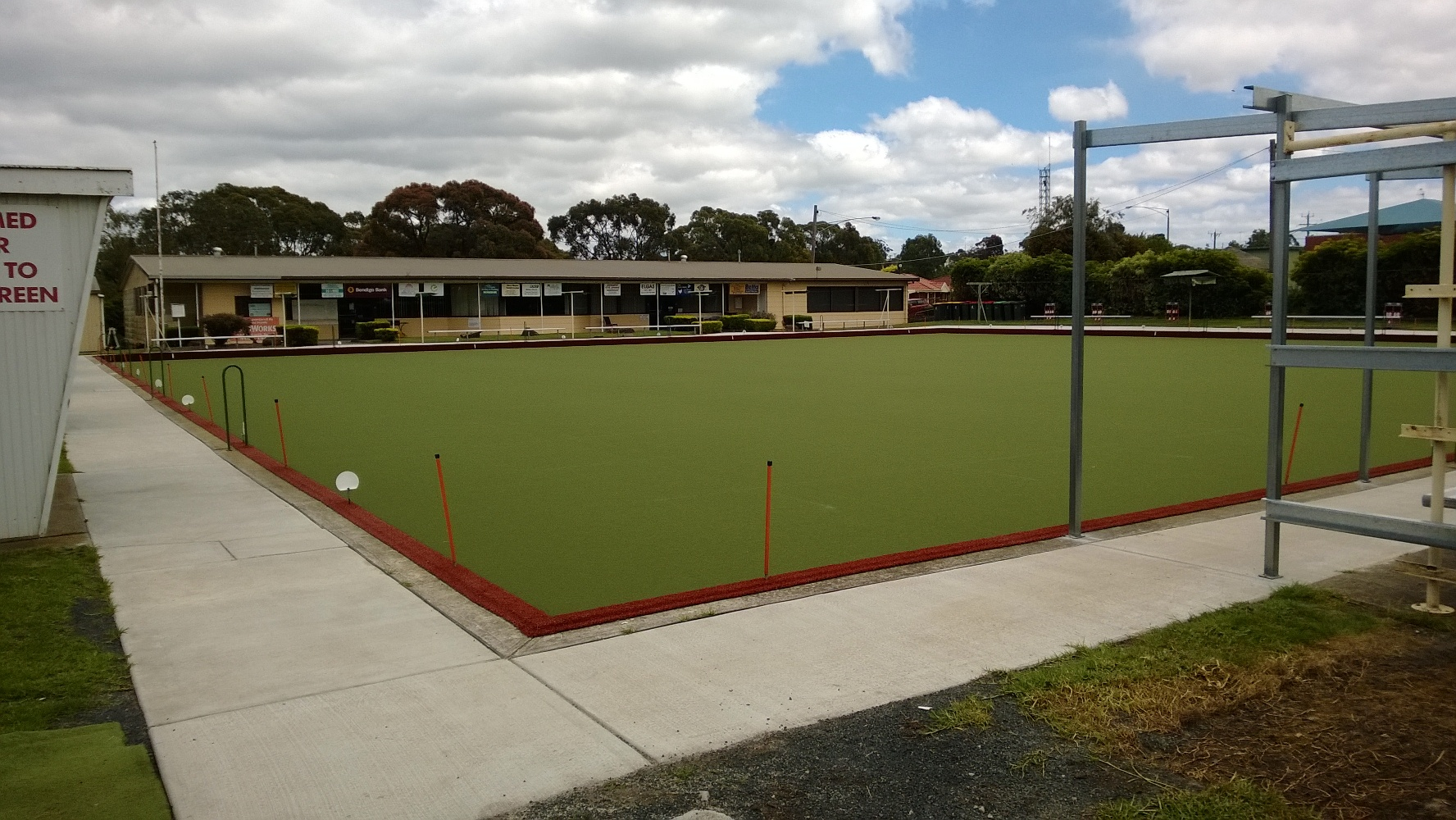
Synthetic bowling green.

There are two main sporting reserves. In town is the Yallourn North Hall and Reserve which consists of Monash Hall, the Junior Football Club, Cricket Club, and Tennis Courts. The other sporting reserve is just out of town to the West and is known as George Bates Reserve. This oval hosts the Senior Football club, Netball club, and on occasion hosts cricket matches. The town also has a modern and centrally located Skate Park and BMX track, as well as a Fire Brigade training track.

There is a lawn bowling club in town, as well as a senior citizens club. There is also an angling club, a pistol club, an outdoor swimming pool and Museum.

The town has a primary school which has approximately 100 students. It participates in the Stephanie Alexander Kitchen Gardens program. There is also a kindergarten and pre-school.

Two electrical contractors servicing the greater Latrobe Valley region, Contracting Kings and Powersauce Electrical, are resident in the town.

== Community and events ==
Yallourn North is increasingly community-focused. After the decline in the decades following the privatisation of the SECV, many recent events have assisted in restoration of positive community sentiment. Two large events illustrating this are the Kelso Road Project, and the Yallourn North Christmas Festival. There is also an annual Australia Day breakfast on 26 January at the Lion's park, as well as a morning ANZAC Day Service on Reserve Street at the memorial on 25 April

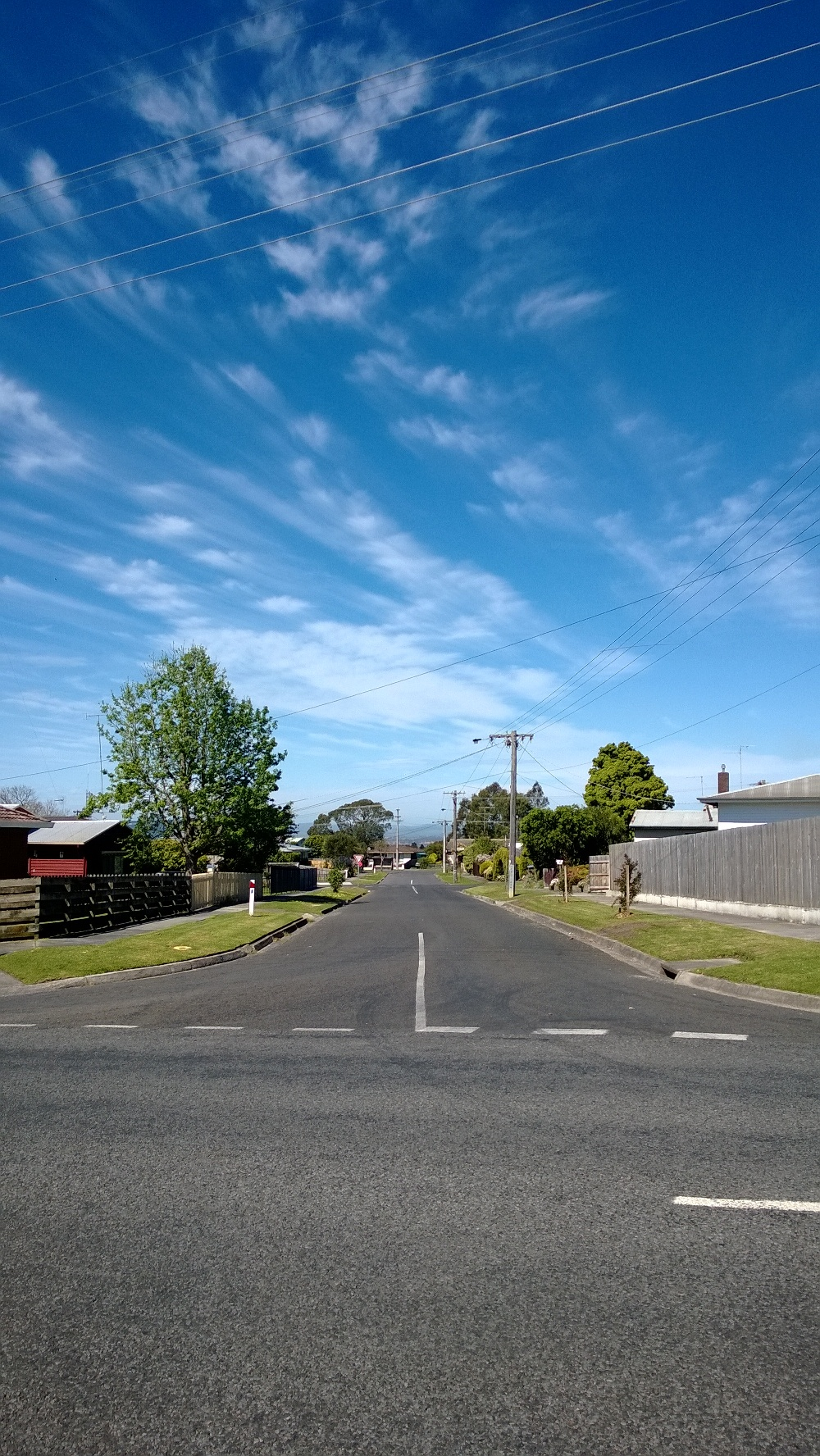
Laid out in the 1950s, Rossmore Street runs centrally through the town, and is the site of the Rossmore Hotel.

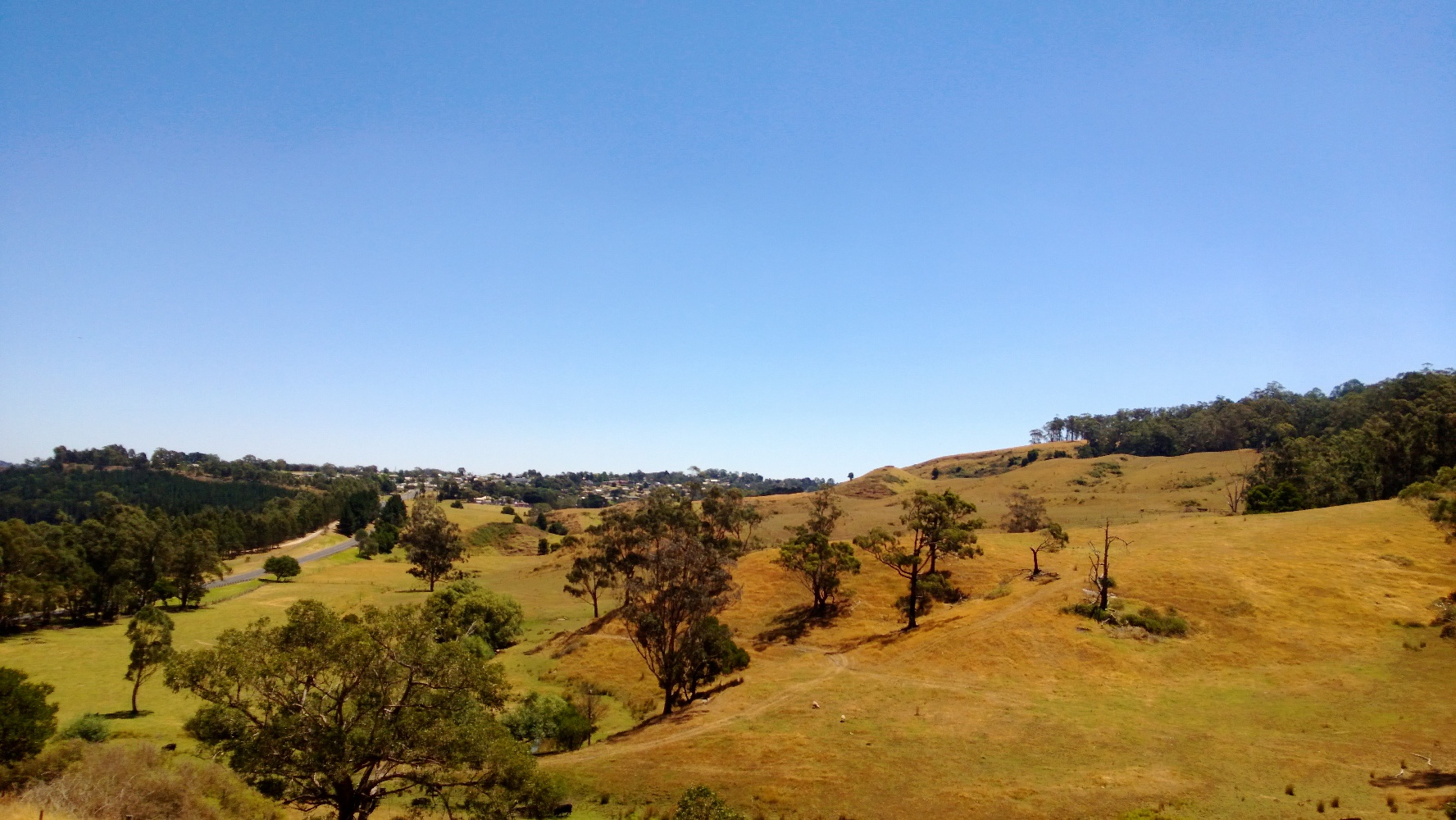
Quarry Road offers superb views of the town.

=== The Kelso Road project ===
The Yallourn North community came together following the deaths of two members of the Sporton family. To assist the family, a dedicated group of 140 volunteers renovated the Sporton family home. The original renovation budget was set at $30,000, but after considerable donations from 208 community members and 70 local businesses, the group managed to raise $48,000 for the work. The final result was an entirely updated home and garden - a far cry from what was originally intended to be a new entrance and a "spruced up" kitchen, laundry, bathroom and lounge room.

=== Yallourn North Christmas Festival ===
On 5 December 2014, Yallourn North hosted its inaugural Christmas Festival, which began with a Twilight Market at Yallourn North Primary School. 70 stalls were held on the school grounds. This was followed by Christmas carols and a trivia quiz at Monash Hall, Barefoot Bowls at the bowling club, an outdoor cinema, and pool party on following days. "1000 shoppers browsed through the stalls" at the market, with a further 1000 attending the other events.
