= Banksieaeformis =

Banksieaeformis Temporal range: Eocene–Oligocene

Scientific classification
- Kingdom: Plantae
- Clade: Tracheophytes
- Clade: Angiosperms
- Clade: Eudicots
- Order: Proteales
- Family: Proteaceae
- Subfamily: Grevilleoideae
- Tribe: Banksieae
- Genus: †Banksieaeformis; Hill & Christophel

Type species
- Banksieaeformis decurrens Hill & Christophel (1988)

Species
- See text

Genus of plants (fossil)

Banksieaeformis is a genus that encompasses plant species only known from fossil leaves that can be attributed to the Proteaceae tribe Banksieae, but cannot be attributed to an extant (living) genus. Unlike those classified in the related genus Banksieaephyllum, the leaves do not have their cuticular architecture preserved. The genus was defined by botanists Bob Hill and David Christophel in 1988 to distinguish banksia-like leaves that had been organically preserved from those that had not.

The two authors designated Banksieaeformis decurrens as the type species. Recovered from middle Eocene deposits at Maslin Bay in South Australia, it is known from a single leaf, 7 cm long and 1 cm wide. The leaf has entire margins in its basal half and pinnate lobes pointed apically in its apical half, which resembles the leaves of the fossil species Banksieaephyllum cuneatum and B. incisum, as well as the living species Banksia grandis, B. baxteri and B. drummondii. However, the overall shape of the leaf does not resemble any living species.

Banksieaeformis dentatus was described by Hill and Christophel from Late Eocene-Oligocene deposits from Cethana in northern Tasmania. These leaves are around 6 cm long and 1 cm wide, and have serrated margins, and resemble the living species Banksia serrata and B. burdettii. The venation is similar to the fossil species Banksieaephyllum attenuatum and B. fastigiatum, though these are a different shape.

Researchers David Greenwood, Peter Haines and David Steart named three more species from Central Australia in 2001: Banksieaeformis serratus, recovered from Paleogene strata at Glen Helen near Alice Springs, resembles the living Banksia serrata, Banksieaeformis langii, recovered from three sites (Stuart Creek, Woomera and Jacks Hill) in northern South Australia, has long narrow lobed leaves at least 8.5 cm long and only 1.2-1.6 cm wide resembling Banksia formosa, and Banksieaeformis praegrandis, also from South Australia, has large leaves with long narrow widely spaced lobes reminiscent of Banksia chamaephyton.
