= Yallourn =

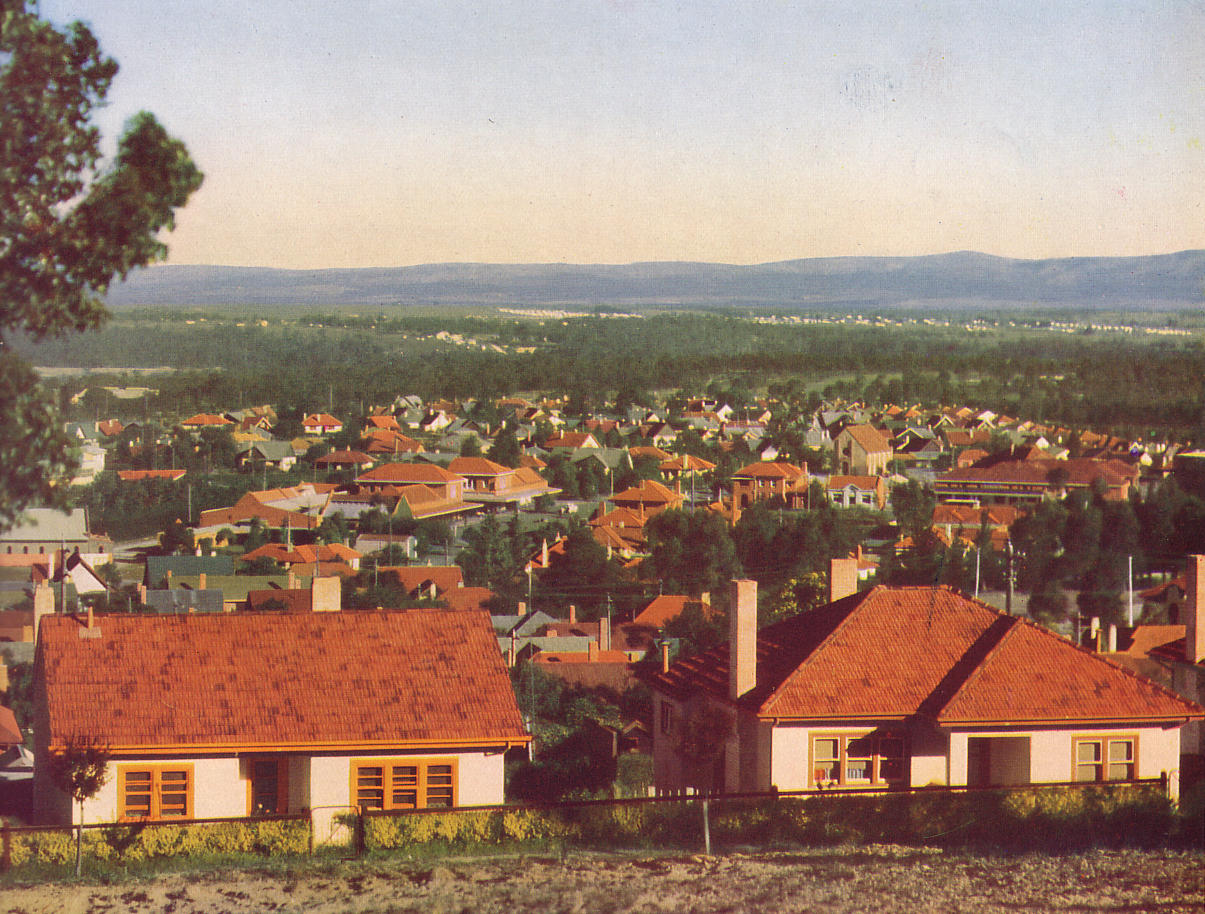
- Overview of Yallourn, 1948

- Coordinates: 38°11′S 146°20′E
- Country: Australia
- State: Victoria
- LGA: City of Latrobe
- Location: 126 km (78 mi) E of Melbourne; 9 km (5.6 mi) NW of Morwell; 5 km (3.1 mi) E of Moe
- Established: 1921

Government
  - State electorate: Morwell
  - Federal divisions: Monash; Gippsland

Population
  - Total: 143 (SAL 2021)
- Postcode: 3825

Yallourn is a locality in the Latrobe Valley region of Victoria, Australia, 126 kilometres (78 mi) east of Melbourne, located within the City of Latrobe local government area. Yallourn was originally a company town, built between 1921 and 1961 to house employees of the State Electricity Commission of Victoria (SECV), which operated the nearby Yallourn Power Station complex. However, expansion of the adjacent open-cut brown coal mine led to the closure and removal of the town in the 1980s. Whilst the township no longer exists, the locality remains with a diminished population; at the 2021 census, Yallourn recorded a population of 143, down from 251 at the 2006 census.

== Design ==
The town was planned by A.R. La Gerche, the SECV's Architect. It is sometimes mistakenly thought to have been designed by Walter Burley Griffin, who planned Canberra, Australia's capital city.

The design of Yallourn incorporated lessons learnt from the early UK garden cities of Welwyn Garden City and Letchworth Garden City inspired by the work of Ebenezer Howard. It included a formal central square adjacent to the shopping area and a "Broadway" bounded by parks between the shopping area and railway station. The whole town area was surrounded by a green belt varying between native vegetation, open parkland and sporting and recreational complexes.

Residents were charged below market rentals and the SECV adopted the role of paternalistic landlord in addition to its role as employer to the majority of the town's income earners. The conflicts this created caused continuing concern throughout the life of the town. For the majority of the town's life, citizen involvement was limited, residents being represented in their dealings with the SECV by a Town Advisory Council that was established in 1947.

Houses within the town were constructed to a limited number of designs but these were varied by differing external detailing and surface finishes. A brick and tile manufacturing plant was built near the town and produced a characteristic terracotta roofing tile which was used to clad most homes. The pitch of the roof structure and overhanging eaves remained similar throughout the town, providing a common theme without the sameness characteristic of English garden city developments. The homes were placed on large plots, typically of 1000 m^{2}, the design brief from General Sir John Monash, the initial SECV chairman requiring that each plot should have sufficient land to permit the tenant to keep a horse and a garden.

== External communications ==
The Yallourn railway line was opened to the town in January 1922 as a branch junctioning at Hernes Oak on the Gippsland railway line; this line was replaced by a one on an easier gradient extending east from Moe in September 1953, which was electrified in 1955. The local railway station closed to passengers in the 1960s, with the line then being used primarily to haul briquettes from the Yallourn briquette factory. When the factory closed, the line was used to haul briquettes from the Morwell factory to Yallourn, as briquettes were used as the initial fuel when lighting the furnaces in the power station until enough steam was generated to dry the brown coal used as the main fuel. Closure of the line occurred in 1986 when the transport of briquettes shifted to trucks.

Yallourn Post Office opened on 8 October 1923 (being renamed from Western Camp which opened the previous year) and closed in 1980 when the town was removed. An earlier Yallourn Post Office opened in 1921 and was renamed Eastern Camp in 1923. Another Western Camp Post Office opened in 1924 and closed in 1968.

== Closure ==
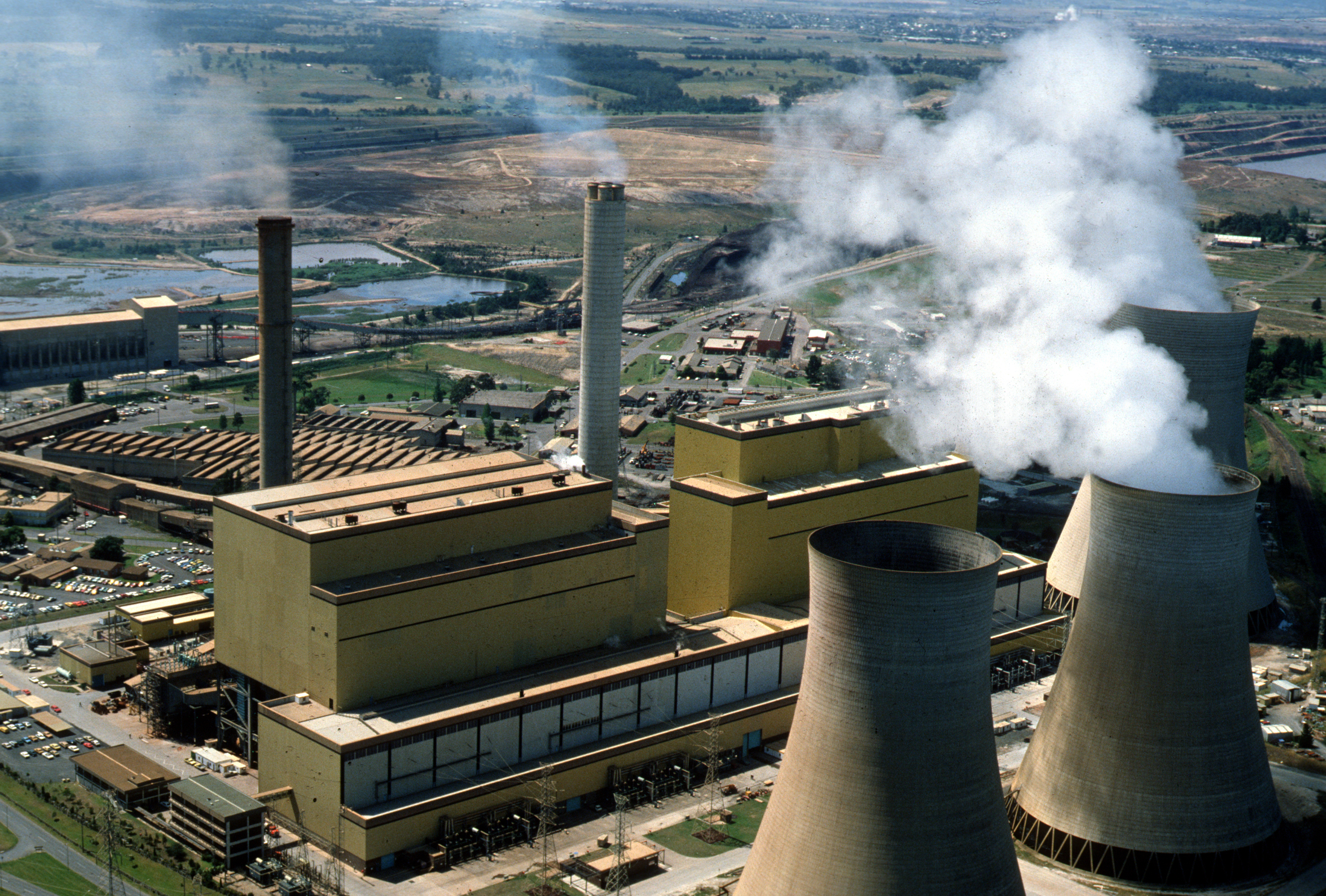
Yallourn W Power Station led to the town's removal

At its peak the town's population reached 5000. However, in 1968 the SECV decided to demolish the town to make way for further mining. Despite an attempted green ban to save the town, by 1983 demolition was complete, the underlying brown coal reserves being used to feed the Yallourn W Power Station. Many of the people who were relocated from Yallourn built homes in Moe, Morwell, Newborough, Traralgon, Yallourn North and other surrounding towns in the Latrobe Valley.

Many of the houses from the town were removed, either to these nearby towns, or on occasion moved further afield. The timber-framed buildings were reclad, although most retained their characteristic Yallourn tiled roof. The SECV developed some properties, particularly in small developments in nearby Newborough where Yallourn houses were removed and samples of the conversions that were possible were showcased. These transplanted Yallourn homes remain popular with former Yallourn residents.

== Sport ==
Golfers play at the course of the Yallourn Golf Club on Golf Links Road in neighbouring Yallourn Heights.

In 1951 Yallourn was the champion soccer club in the state of Victoria.

In June 1952, during the 1952 VFL season, a senior Victorian Football League (VFL) game between Footscray and St Kilda was played at Yallourn Oval, with St Kilda being victorious. The match was organised as part of an effort by the Australian National Football Council (ANFC) to promote the sport, and the other matches in the round were played in Albury, Brisbane, Euroa, Hobart, and Sydney (all non-standard venues). The match in Yallourn was affected by rain, but still drew a crowd estimated at 3,500 people.

== Notable residents ==
- Gaele Sobott, author, born in Yallourn
- Marjorie Thorpe, Aboriginal activist, daughter of Alma Thorpe and mother of politician Lidia Thorpe, coordinator of SNAICC as well as director of the Victorian Aboriginal Child Care Agency
- Pat Kennelly Victorian Labour Party Senator for Victoria from 1953 to 1971
- Gary Wiggins, professional cyclist

== Documentaries ==
In 1974 the SECV made a living history documentary about Yallourn, Born to Die. In June 2008, the ABC Radio program Hindsight presented a two-hour radio documentary about the history of Yallourn, The Model Town and the Machine: A History of Yallourn.

== In music ==
The Weddings, Parties, Anything song Industrial town is about Yallourn. The band's frontman Mick Thomas was born in Yallourn and lived there as a child, where his father worked for the SECV.
