= Glengarry, Victoria =

Glengarry
- Town
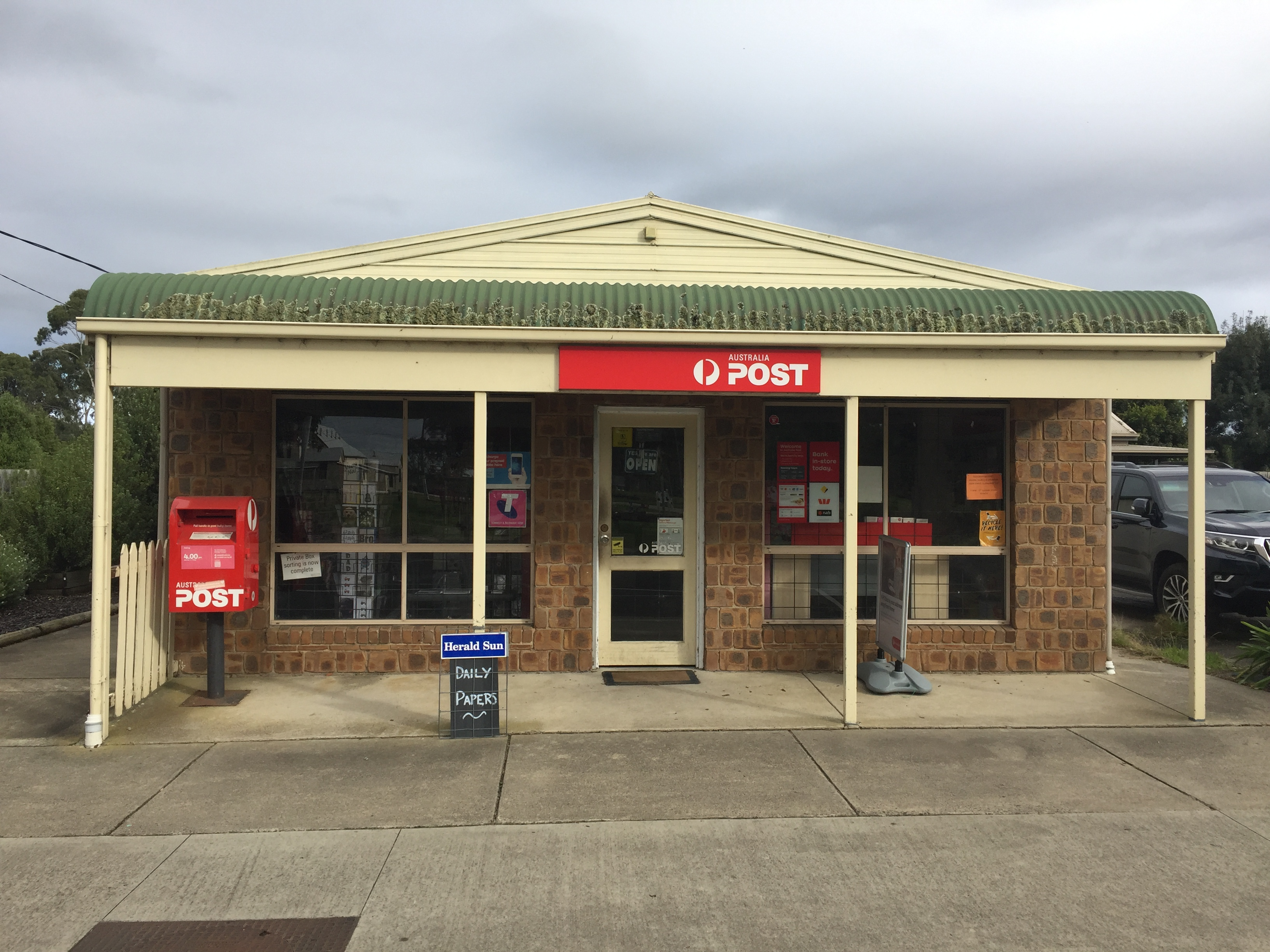
- Post office in 2022

- Coordinates: 38°08′S 146°33′E
- Country: Australia
- State: Victoria
- LGA: City of Latrobe
- Location: 165 km (103 mi) SE of Melbourne; 11 km (6.8 mi) N of Traralgon

Government
  - State electorate: Morwell
  - Federal division: Gippsland

Population
  - Total: 1,084 (2016 census)
- Postcode: 3854

Glengarry is a town in the Gippsland region of Victoria, Australia. The town is located in the City of Latrobe local government area, 9 km north of Traralgon and 165 kilometres (103 mi) south east of the state capital, Melbourne. At the 2016 census, Glengarry had a population of 1084.

== History ==
A small community called La Trobe was established on relatively flat land near the La Trobe River. Selectors began to take up land in the early 1870s by which time the area was known as Toongabbie South.

A railway line from Traralgon to Heyfield passed nearby in 1883 and a railway station was built to service the community. The Post Office opened on 1 January 1884 and La Trobe Railway Station was renamed Glengarry in December of that year. There were three hotels by the 1880s and a Mechanics Institute (1886).

The Glengarry Farmer's Union proposed the creation of a Glengarry Creamery (butter factory) in March 1890 and it was in operation by the end of the year.

== Today ==
The town has Australian Rules football teams and netball teams competing in the North Gippsland Football League as well as cricket and tennis clubs. One hotel remains in operation in the Main Street and there is also a pharmacy, IGA Supermarket, bakery, hairdresser, pizza van and a craft and coffee shop.

== See also ==
- Glengarry railway station
