= Fumina South =

Fumina South Victoria
- Coordinates: 37°57′0″S 146°07′0″E
- Population: 65 (SAL 2021)
- Postcode(s): 3825
- Location: 138 km (86 mi) E of Melbourne; 50 km (31 mi) NE of Drouin; 28 km (17 mi) W of Neerim
- LGA(s): Shire of Baw Baw
- State electorate(s): Narracan
- Federal division(s): Monash

Fumina South is a locality in Victoria, Australia. Located on Willowgrove Road, in the Shire of Baw Baw, it is an isolated pocket near the foothills of Mount Baw Baw. Fumina South has a population of approximately 50 people, mostly weekend farmers and retirees, although it was once a bustling community with its own post office and school.

The Post Office opened in 1907 as Duggan, was renamed Fumina South in 1925 and closed in 1962.
