= Neerim Junction =

- Town
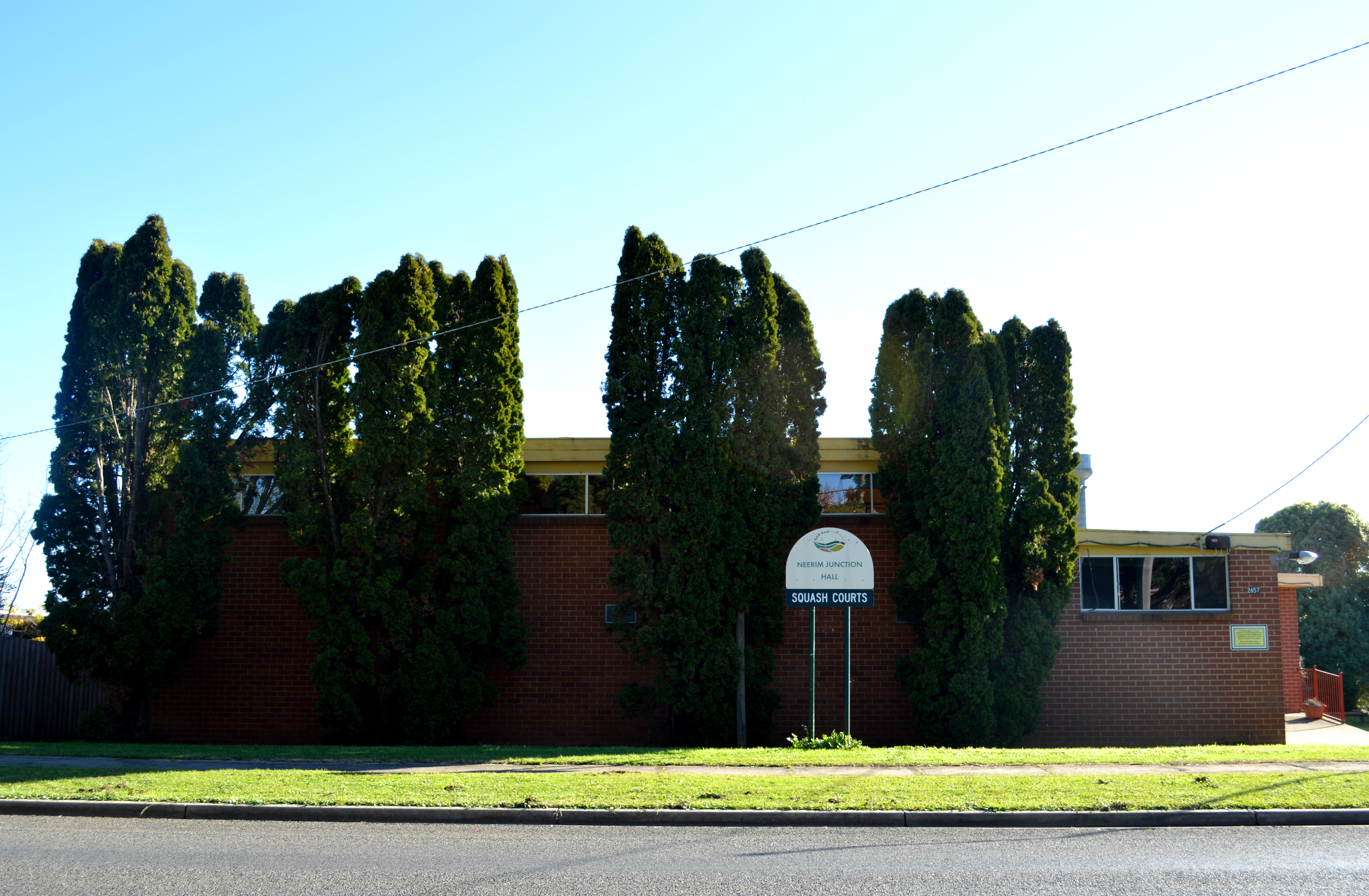
- Neerim Junction Public Hall, Neerim Junction

- Coordinates: 37°55′46″S 145°57′42″E
- Country: Australia
- State: Victoria
- LGA: Shire of Baw Baw

Population
  - Total: 127 (2016)
- Postcode: 3832

Neerim Junction is a town in West Gippsland, Victoria, Australia, located in the Shire of Baw Baw, 89 kilometres (55 mi) from Melbourne and 26 kilometres (16 mi) from Warragul. At the 2016 Census, Neerim Junction had a population of 127. Its postcode is 3832 and its Main Street hosts a general store with an Australia Post office, a small playground and a petrol station. It is one of several Neerim settlements, the others being Neerim South, Neerim North, Neerim and Neerim East.
