= Moe River (Australia) =

- Location of the Moe River mouth in Victoria

Location
- Country: Australia
- State: Victoria
- Region: South East Coastal Plain (IBRA), West Gippsland
- Local government area: Baw Baw

Physical characteristics
- Source
  - location: near Ellinbank, south of Warragul
  - coordinates: 38°13′53″S 145°54′51″E
  - elevation: 174 m (571 ft)
- Mouth: confluence with the Latrobe River
  - location: north of Moe
  - coordinates: 38°9′8″S 146°16′7″E
  - elevation: 76 m (249 ft)
- Length: 18 km (11 mi)

Basin features
- River system: West Gippsland catchment
- Tributaries
  - right: Bear Creek (Victoria)

The Moe River is a perennial river of the West Gippsland catchment, in the West Gippsland region of the Australian state of Victoria.

== Location and features ==
The Moe River rises near Ellinbank, south of Warragul, and flows generally east by north, joined by on minor tributary, before reaching its confluence with the Latrobe River, north of Moe, upriver of Lake Narracan, within the Shire of Baw Baw. Much of the course of the Moe River is diverted via a drain, north of Yarragon to the Moe Sewerage Authority Settling Pond. The river descends 98 metres (322 ft) over its 18-kilometre (11 mi) course.

The river is traversed by the Princes Highway between Yarragon and Darnum.

== See also ==
- List of rivers of Australia § Victoria
