= Buln Buln East =

Buln Buln East Victoria
- Coordinates: 38°05′16″S 145°59′34″E
- Population: 164 (2016 census)
- Postcode(s): 3821
- Location: 118 km (73 mi) from Melbourne; 19 km (12 mi) from Warragul
- LGA(s): Shire of Baw Baw
- State electorate(s): Narracan
- Federal division(s): Monash

Buln Buln East is a locality in West Gippsland, Victoria. At the 2016 census, Buln Buln East had a population of 164 mostly born in Australia.

== See also ==
- County of Buln Buln
