= Tanjil Bren =

- Town
- Coordinates: 37°49′29″S 146°10′39″E
- Country: Australia
- State: Victoria
- LGA: Shire of Baw Baw
- Location: 151 km (94 mi) E of Melbourne; 52 km (32 mi) N of Moe; 23 km (14 mi) NE of Icy Creek; 12 km (7.5 mi) W of Mount Baw Baw

Government
  - State electorate: Narracan
  - Federal division: Monash
- Elevation: 838 m (2,749 ft)

Population
  - Total: 110 (2006 census)
- Postcode: 3833
- Mean max temp: 15.4 °C (59.7 °F)
- Mean min temp: 5.6 °C (42.1 °F)
- Annual rainfall: 1,736.5 mm (68.37 in)
Localities around Tanjil Bren
McMahons Creek	Erica	Erica
Noojee	Tanjil Bren	Erica
Willow Grove	Tanjil South	Moondarra

Tanjil Bren is a town in Victoria, Australia, on Mount Baw Baw Tourist Road, 12 kilometres (7 mi) west of Mount Baw Baw in the Shire of Baw Baw. It was established during the Victorian Gold Rush.Tanjil Lodge is the original town general store . Four accommodation lodges, Mooshead, Reindeer, Jenny's and Timbertop Lodge, are located in Tanjil Bren. At the 2006 census, Tanjil Bren and the surrounding area had a population of 110.

Tanjil Bren Post Office opened on 1 November 1939, now Tanjil Lodge and closed in 1971, however the lodge is still in operation.

== Climate ==
Tanjil Bren has a cold rainforest climate, with especially high rainfall between May and November. Heavy snowfalls are a frequent occurrence and can occur even in late spring to early summer.

Climate data for Tanjil Bren (1942–1971); 838 m AMSL; 37.80° S, 146.20° E
Month	Jan	Feb	Mar	Apr	May	Jun	Jul	Aug	Sep	Oct	Nov	Dec	Year
Mean daily maximum °C (°F)	22.6 (72.7)	22.3 (72.1)	20.1 (68.2)	15.5 (59.9)	11.7 (53.1)	9.1 (48.4)	8.5 (47.3)	9.6 (49.3)	12.5 (54.5)	15.2 (59.4)	17.4 (63.3)	20.6 (69.1)	15.4 (59.8)
Mean daily minimum °C (°F)	9.4 (48.9)	10.1 (50.2)	8.7 (47.7)	6.2 (43.2)	4.2 (39.6)	2.5 (36.5)	1.7 (35.1)	2.0 (35.6)	3.2 (37.8)	4.9 (40.8)	6.0 (42.8)	8.1 (46.6)	5.6 (42.1)
Average precipitation mm (inches)	89.4 (3.52)	89.2 (3.51)	102.7 (4.04)	136.9 (5.39)	186.5 (7.34)	144.1 (5.67)	157.9 (6.22)	169.6 (6.68)	168.2 (6.62)	172.8 (6.80)	171.6 (6.76)	140.6 (5.54)	1,736.5 (68.37)
Average precipitation days (≥ 0.2 mm)	12.1	11.9	13.0	14.2	18.4	17.7	19.0	20.0	17.7	18.0	15.7	14.4	192.1
Source: Australian Bureau of Meteorology; Tanjil Bren
