= Mount Mueller (Victoria) =

Mountain in Victoria, Australia

- Location within Victoria

Highest point
- Elevation: 1,460 metres (4,790 ft) AHD
- Parent peak: Mount Baw Baw
- Coordinates: 37°51′10″S 146°17′11″E

Geography
- Location: Victorian Alps, Victoria
- Parent range: Baw Baw Plateau, Great Dividing Range

Mount Mueller is a mountain of the Great Dividing Range, located in Victoria, Australia. Mount Mueller has an elevation of 1,460 metres (4,790 ft) AHD.

== Location ==
Mount Mueller is about 120 kilometres (75 mi) east of Melbourne and 50 kilometres (31 mi) north of the Latrobe Valley. The mountain itself is one of several peaks on the Baw Baw Plateau, a long plateau tending north-east. Other peaks on the plateau include Mount Baw Baw, Mount Whitelaw, Mount St Phillack (the highest), Mount Tyers, Mount Kernot and Mount St Gwinear. The plateau itself is isolated from most of Victoria's high country by the Thomson and Aberfeldy rivers and tributaries of the La Trobe River, including the Tanjil and Tyers rivers to the south.

== Geology and biology ==
The Baw Baw massif consists of a late Devonian granodiorite pluton. There is relatively little relief on the plateau itself, the highest point (Mount St. Phillack) reaching 1,567 metres (5,141 ft). The lower slopes of the plateau are covered in montane eucalypt forest and tall forest, and creek valleys have cool temperate rainforest of myrtle beech, Nothofagus cunninghamii. Above 1,200 metres (3,900 ft) snow gum woodland occurs. There is no alttudinal treeline limit; subalpine grasslands and shrublands occur in flat valley bottoms on the plateau as a result of cold-air drainage. Much of this subalpine zone is included in the 133 square kilometres (51 sq mi) Baw Baw National Park.

The climate of the plateau itself is subalpine, with an average annual precipitation of 1,900 millimetres (75 in). Snow covers the plateau from June to September.

== See also ==
- Alpine National Park
- List of mountains in Australia § Victoria
