= Toorongo =

- Town
- Coordinates: 37°47′S 146°07′E
- Country: Australia
- State: Victoria
- LGAs: Shire of Baw Baw; Shire of Yarra Ranges

Government
  - State electorates: Eildon; Narracan
  - Federal division: Monash

Population
  - Total: 0 (2021 census)
- Postcode: 3833
- County: Buln Buln

Toorongo is a locality in Victoria, Australia, located within the Shires of Baw Baw and Yarra Ranges local government areas. Toorongo recorded no population at the 2021 census.

== History ==
Toorongo Valley Post Office opened on 14 September 1914 and closed the next year. A Toorongo Falls Telegraph Office remained open until 1942.

== See also ==
- Toorongo Falls Reserve
- Toorongo River
