= Jindivick =

Rural Victorian town in Australia near Mount Baw Baw

- Town
- Coordinates: 38°02′0″S 145°54′0″E
- Country: Australia
- State: Victoria
- LGA: Shire of Baw Baw
- Established: 1858

Government
  - State electorate: Narracan
  - Federal division: Monash
- Elevation: 261 m (856 ft)

Population
  - Total: 584 (2021 census)
- Postcode: 3818
- County: Buln Buln
Localities around Jindivick
		Neerim East
Labertouche	Jindivick	Neerim South
Labertouche	Rokeby	Crossover

Jindivick is a town in Victoria, Australia, located on Jacksons Track, in the Shire of Baw Baw. The town was first established in 1858 by Joseph Jackson. The word ‘Jindivick’ is an Aboriginal word that is translated to, ‘burst asunder’.

== History ==
In 1858, Jindivick was established by Joseph Henry Jackson who blazed a track that he named ‘Jackson’s Track’. This track was initially intended to help pastoralists and miners travel from one area to another and to reach Mount Baw Baw. Due to this demand by travellers, in 1877, a general store opened for business in the southern part of the district and a school was later started. A mechanic’s institute hall was constructed in 1886.

The first Drouin Post Office opened on 5 April 1876, was renamed Jindivick in 1878 and Drouin West within months. Jindivick Post Office opened again in 1880 and was renamed Tarago in 1888. The third Jindivick Post Office opened later in 1888 and closed in 1994.

In 1910, a Presbyterian and Anglican Church was founded to serve the growing population in the first half of the 20th century. By 1954, the town of Jindivick (excluding the surrounding region) had reached a permanent population of 390. Further timber and dairy industries were invested in during the middle part of the 20th century which founded the backbone of the region’s income. Currently, there is a community hall, church, school, tennis court, doctors office and a reserve with a memorial to the World Wars and the founder of the town, Joseph Jackson.

== Notable people ==
- Joseph Jackson (1832–1868) – British settler that blazed out Jackson's Track and founded Jindivick in 1858.
- Lionel Rose MBE (1948–2011) – Aboriginal Australian professional boxer between 1964 and 1976. He was also related to by marriage to the Australian author, Daryl Tonkin who settled in Jindivick in 1936. Rose was Australian of the Year in 1968, the first indigenous Australian to claim that honour.
- Beau Miles (1979–present) – Australian YouTuber and part of the agricultural community has a large property lot outside the town. He is also known from the "Bass by Kayak" television series in which he and a small expedition set out to cross the sea from Australian mainland to Tasmania in kayaks over a two-week period. He has done many trips similar, including Africa, and is known for his filming and documentaries.
