= Nilma =

- Town
- Coordinates: 38°11′0″S 145°58′0″E
- Country: Australia
- State: Victoria
- LGA(s): Shire of Baw Baw
- Location: 103 km (64 mi) from Melbourne; 3 km (1.9 mi) from Warragul

Government
  - State electorate(s): Narracan
  - Federal division(s): Monash

Population
  - Total(s): 319 (2016 census)
- Postcode: 3821
Localities around Nilma
| Warragul | Nilma North | Nilma North |
| Warragul | Nilma | Nilma North |
| Warragul | Bona Vista | Darnum |

Nilma is a locality in the West Gippsland region of Victoria, Australia located between Warragul and Darnum.

The Post Office opened on 1 May 1886 as Bloomfield Railway Station, was renamed Nilma in 1909 and closed in 1979.

The locality in conjunction with neighbouring township Darnum has an Australian Rules football team competing in the Ellinbank & District Football League.
