= Lillico, Victoria =

Lillico Victoria
- Coordinates: 38°07′33″S 145°57′43″E
- Population: 94 (2021 census)
- Postcode(s): 3820
- LGA(s): Shire of Baw Baw
- State electorate(s): Narracan
- Federal division(s): Monash

Lillico is a fast growing suburb now included with Warragul, in West Gippsland, Victoria. At the 2021 census, it had a population of 94.
