= Moe River =

Moe River may refer to:

- Moe River (Australia), Victoria, Australia
- Moe River (rivière aux Saumons), Estrie, Quebec, Canada
