= Longwarry =

- Town
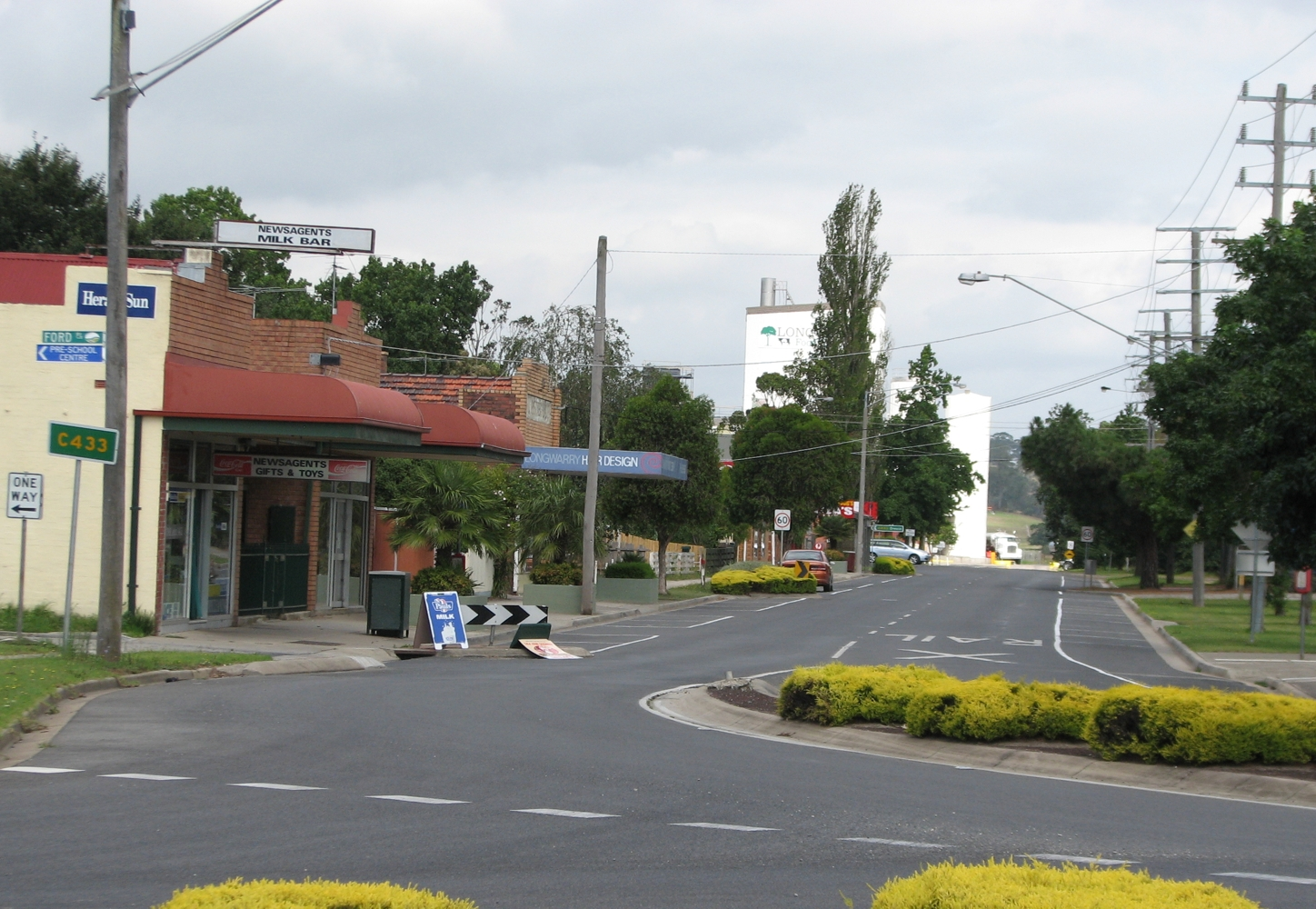
- Mackay Street

- Interactive map of Longwarry
- Coordinates: 38°06′0″S 145°46′0″E
- Country: Australia
- State: Victoria
- LGAs: Shire of Baw Baw; Shire of Cardinia
- Location: 83 km (52 mi) from Melbourne; 9 km (5.6 mi) from Drouin

Government
  - State electorate: Narracan
  - Federal division: Monash

Population
  - Total: 2,436 (2021 census)
- Postcode: 3816
- County: Buln Buln
Localities around Longwarry
Garfield North	Labertouche	Robin Hood
Bunyip	Longwarry	Drouin
Iona	Ripplebrook	Drouin South

Longwarry is a town in Victoria, Australia, 83 kilometres (52 mi) south-east of Melbourne's Central Business District, located within the Shires of Baw Baw and Cardinia local government areas. Longwarry recorded a population of 2,436 at the 2021 census.

It has one primary school, Longwarry Primary School.

Longwarry is bypassed by the Princes Freeway.

== History ==
The railway arrived in 1879 and a post office opened on 20 June 1881. The post office was renamed Longwarry South (later Ripplebrook) on 1 September 1882, the same day a new office, named Longwarry, opened near the railway station.

Longwarry railway station provides rail services to Melbourne as well as Bairnsdale.

The town has an Australian Rules football team competing in the Ellinbank & District Football League.

== See also ==
- Shire of Buln Buln – Longwarry was previously within this former local government area.
