= Yarragon =

- Town
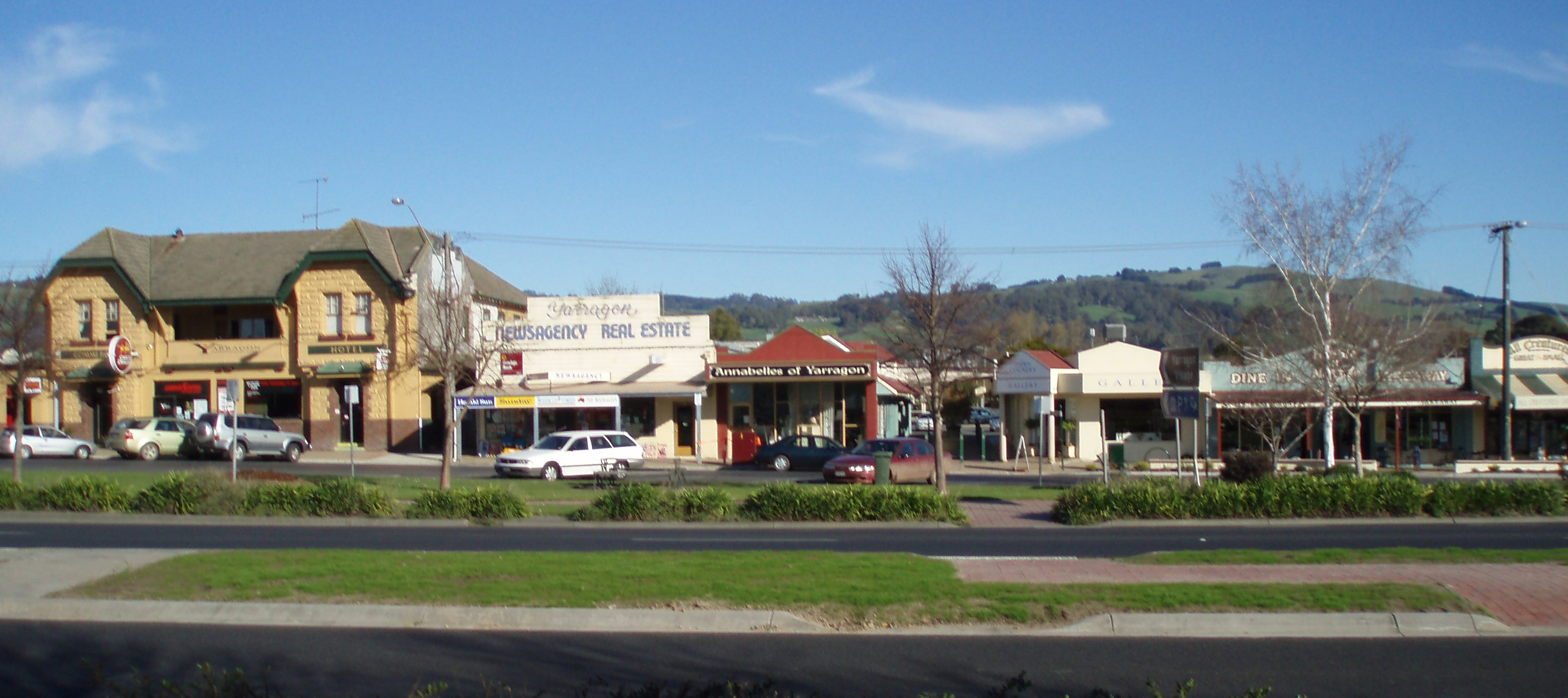
- Part of Yarragon's main streetscape looking south

- Coordinates: 38°12′0″S 146°04′0″E
- Country: Australia
- State: Victoria
- LGA: Shire of Baw Baw
- Location: 117 km (73 mi) E of Melbourne; 17 km (11 mi) W of Moe; 17 km (11 mi) E of Warragul

Government
  - State electorate: Narracan
  - Federal division: Monash

Population
  - Total: 1,650 (2016 census)
- Postcode: 3823
- County: Buln Buln

Yarragon is a town in the Shire of Baw Baw in the West Gippsland region of Victoria, Australia. The town lies on the Princes Highway and the Gippsland railway line approximately halfway between the major towns of Warragul and Moe. Hills of the Strzelecki Ranges rise over 500 metres (1,600 ft) immediately to the south of the town, providing a spectacular backdrop, while the Moe River and the lowlands lie to the north and east. Mount Worth at 515 m (1,690 ft) above sea level is the highest near peak to the south in the Mount Worth State Park 16 kilometres (9.9 mi) SSW of Yarragon. Mount Baw Baw at 1,563 m (5,128 ft) in the Baw Baw Ranges as part of the Great Dividing Range to the north is approximately 85 kilometres (53 mi) NNE of Yarragon. The township sits at approximately 88 metres (289 ft) above sea level. At the 2006 census, Yarragon had a population of 1131.

== History ==
The town was a centre for dairy farms in the vicinity (a former dairy factory lies to the north of the railway line), as well as logging activities in the heavily forested hills to the south. The Post Office opened around October 1878 as Waterloo, Gippsland and was renamed Yarragon in 1883.

== Today ==
Significant expansion of facilities and businesses along Yarragon's main Princes Highway streetscape since the 1990s aimed at capitalising on the tourist potential of passing traffic has resulted in the town being informally dubbed 'Yarragon Village'.

The town has its own railway station on the Gippsland railway line. The station is unstaffed and used to be home to rail yards and storage for track gangs.

Yarragon has an Australian rules football team, known as the Panthers, competing in the Ellinbank & District Football Netball League. It previously competed in the Mid Gippsland Football League in which it won the Under 18's Premiership in 2013 and the Under 16's in 2012. Yarragon is also home to the Yarragon Netball Club.

== Media ==
=== Newspapers ===
Yarragon has two weekly local newspapers, The Warragul and Drouin Gazette and a free publication, The West Gippsland Trader. According to the Warragul Regional Newspapers website, The Gazette and The Trader are distributed to locations from as far as Pakenham to Moe and from Poowong to Noojee covering over 40,000 readers.

Yarragon is also serviced by free monthly tabloid and online newspaper the Warragul & Baw Baw Citizen. The paper was established as The Warragul Citizen in 2011 as a quarterly print paper before becoming bimonthly in 2012, covering Warragul, Drouin and Yarragon. The paper's online news offering started in late 2011, covering all of Baw Baw. The paper moved to being online-only in 2013, before returning to print in its present form in July 2014.

=== Radio ===
Warragul radio stations Triple M Gippsland and 3GG service this region.
