= Labertouche =

- Town
- Coordinates: 38.047970°S 145.830841°E
- Country: Australia
- State: Victoria
- LGA: Shire of Baw Baw

Government
  - State electorate: Narracan
  - Federal division: Monash

Population
  - Total: 356 (2016 census)
- Postcode: 3816
- County: Buln Buln
Localities around Labertouche
| Bunyip State Park | Bunyip State Park | Neerim |
| Tonimbuk | Labertouche | Jindivick |
| Bunyip | Longwarry | Drouin |

Labertouche is in Victoria, Australia, on Jacksons Track, in the Shire of Baw Baw. At the 2016 census, Labertouche had a population of 356.

The first post office in Labertouche opened on 5 April 1876.

The locality is named after Peter Paul Labertouche, the Secretary of the Victorian Railways Department in the late nineteenth century, and who descended from an Irish Huguenots family.

A school was opened in 1880 and continues to operate.

The tree species Grevillea barklyana is endemic to an area near Labertouche.

== Notable residents ==
- Lionel Rose Australian Aboriginal boxer, born at Jacksons Track settlement near Labertouche and attended Labertouche Primary School.

== Places of interest ==
- Labertouche Cave – granite caves
