= Ferndale, Victoria =

Ferndale Victoria
- Population: 48 (2021)
  - Density: 3.00/km^{2} (7.8/sq mi)
- Elevation: 339 m (1,112 ft)
- Area: 16 km^{2} (6.2 sq mi)
- LGA(s): Baw Baw Shire
- Region: West Gippsland
Mean max temp	Mean min temp	Annual rainfall
19.4 °C; 67 °F	9.3 °C; 49 °F	1,029 mm 40.5 in

Ferndale is a locality within the local government area of Baw Baw in Victoria. It is located approximately 102 kilometres away from Melbourne and covers an area of 16 square kilometres.

== Demographics ==
According to the 2021 Census, Ferndale has a population of 48 people, of which 58.8% are male and 41.2% are female. The median weekly household income was $1,625 and the median age was 49.
