= Tyers River =

River in Victoria, Australia

Tyers
- Location of the Tyers River mouth in Victoria

Location
- Country: Australia
- State: Victoria
- Region: South East Coastal Plain (IBRA), West Gippsland
- Local government areas: Shire of Baw Baw, Latrobe City

Physical characteristics
- Source: Great Dividing Range
  - location: Talbot Peak
  - coordinates: 37°53′22″S 146°20′45″E
  - elevation: 1,240 m (4,070 ft)
- 2nd source: Tyers River West Branch
  - location: below Mount Mueller
  - elevation: 1,130 m (3,710 ft)
- 3rd source: Tyers River East Branch
  - location: Talbot Peak, Mount Mueller
  - elevation: 551 m (1,808 ft)
- Source confluence: East and West branches of the Tyers River
  - location: Tyers Junction
  - coordinates: 37°57′39″S 146°20′2″E
  - elevation: 260 m (850 ft)
- Mouth: confluence with the Latrobe River
  - location: west of Tyers
  - coordinates: 38°9′43″S 146°26′13″E
  - elevation: 35 m (115 ft)
- Length: 57 km (35 mi)

Basin features
- River system: West Gippsland catchment
- Tributaries
  - right: Jacobs Creek (Victoria)
- National park: Baw Baw National Park

The Tyers River is a perennial river of the West Gippsland catchment, in the West Gippsland region of the Australian state of Victoria.

== Course and features ==
The Tyers River rises below Talbot Peak, part of the Great Dividing Range, within the Baw Baw National Park at an elevation of 1,240 metres (4,070 ft) and descends steeply. At Tyers Junction the river is joined by the confluence of the Tyers River West Branch that drains the eastern slopes of Mount Mueller from an elevation of 1,130 metres (3,710 ft) and the Tyers River East Branch that drains the southern slopes of Talbot Peak from an elevation of 551 metres (1,808 ft). The river flows in a highly meandering course generally south, then south by east, through the Moondarra State Park, joined by one minor tributary, before reaching its confluence with the Latrobe River west of Tyers in the Latrobe City local government area. The river descends 1,200 metres (3,900 ft) over its 57-kilometre (35 mi) course.

The river name comes from the Crown Land Commissioner for Gippsland circa late 1880s, Charles J. Tyers.

The Tyers River is impounded by the Moondarra Reservoir, at the junction of the Tyers River and Jacobs Creek. The 30,400 thousand cubic metres (1,070×10^{6} cu ft) reservoir is predominantly used to augment domestic water supplies.

The Tyers River sub-catchment area is managed by the West Gippsland Catchment Management Authority.

== See also ==
- List of rivers of Australia § Victoria
