= Maurie Lehmann =

Australian rules footballer (1931–2020)

Personal information
- Full name: Maurice Douglas Lehmann
- Born: 18 May 1931
- Died: 5 December 2020 (aged 89); Drouin
- Original team: State Savings Bank
- Height: 180 cm (5 ft 11 in)
- Weight: 76 kg (168 lb)

Playing career^{1}
Years	Club	Games (Goals)
1952	Melbourne	6 (1)
- ^{1} Playing statistics correct to the end of 1952.

Maurice Douglas Lehmann (18 May 1931 – 5 December 2020) was an Australian rules footballer who played with Melbourne in the Victorian Football League (VFL).
