= Toorongo River =

River in Victoria, Australia

Toorongo
- Location of the Toorongo River mouth in Victoria

Location
- Country: Australia
- State: Victoria
- Region: South East Coastal Plain (IBRA), West Gippsland
- Local government area: Shire of Baw Baw

Physical characteristics
- Source: Cone Hill, Mount Toorongo Range, Great Dividing Range
  - location: remote country east northeast of Powelltown
  - coordinates: 37°48′36″S 146°3′17″E
  - elevation: 705 m (2,313 ft)
- Mouth: confluence with the Latrobe River
  - location: north of Neerim North
  - coordinates: 37°54′20″S 146°1′29″E
  - elevation: 215 m (705 ft)
- Length: 12 km (7.5 mi)

Basin features
- River system: West Gippsland catchment
- Tributaries
  - left: Mundic Creek
- National park: Hawthorn Creek Reference Area

The Toorongo River is a perennial river of the West Gippsland catchment, in the West Gippsland region of the Australian state of Victoria.

== Course and features ==
Toorongo River rises below Cone Hill within the Mount Toorongo Range, part of the Great Dividing Range, in remote country east northeast of Powelltown. The river flows generally south, joined by one minor tributary and is fed by drainage spilling over the Toorongo Falls, before reaching its confluence with the Latrobe River, near the Mount Baw Baw Road, north of the locality of Neerim North in the Shire of Baw Baw. The river descends 490 metres (1,610 ft) over its 12-kilometre (7.5 mi) course.

The Toorongo River sub-catchment area is managed by the West Gippsland Catchment Management Authority.

== See also ==
- List of rivers of Australia § Victoria
