= Nilma North =

- Town
- Coordinates: 38°04′41″S 145°59′12″E
- Country: Australia
- State: Victoria
- LGA: Shire of Baw Baw

Government
  - State electorate: Narracan
  - Federal division: Monash

Population
  - Total: 319 (2016 census)
- Postcode: 3821

Nilma North is a locality in West Gippsland, Victoria. At the 2016 census, it had a population of 319.
