= Lardner, Victoria =

Lardner
- Town
- Coordinates: 38°12′37″S 145°52′50″E
- Country: Australia
- State: Victoria
- LGA: Shire of Baw Baw

Government
  - State electorate: Narracan
  - Federal division: Monash

Population
  - Total: 110 (2021 census)
- Postcode: 3821

Lardner is a locality in West Gippsland, Victoria. At the 2021 census, it had a population of 110. At the 2016 census, it had a population of 117.
