= Parkers Corner =

- Town
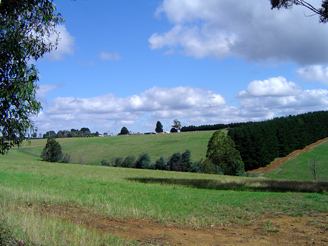
- Potato farm at Parkers Corner

- Coordinates: 37°57′0″S 146°23′0″E
- Country: Australia
- State: Victoria
- LGA: Shire of Baw Baw

Population
  - Total: 12 (?)

Parkers Corner is a locality in Victoria, Australia, located at the junction of Rawson Road and Tyers - Thomson Valley Road, in the Shire of Baw Baw.

Parkers Corner Post Office opened on 16 January 1950 and closed in 1967.
