= Drouin, Victoria =

Drouin
- Town
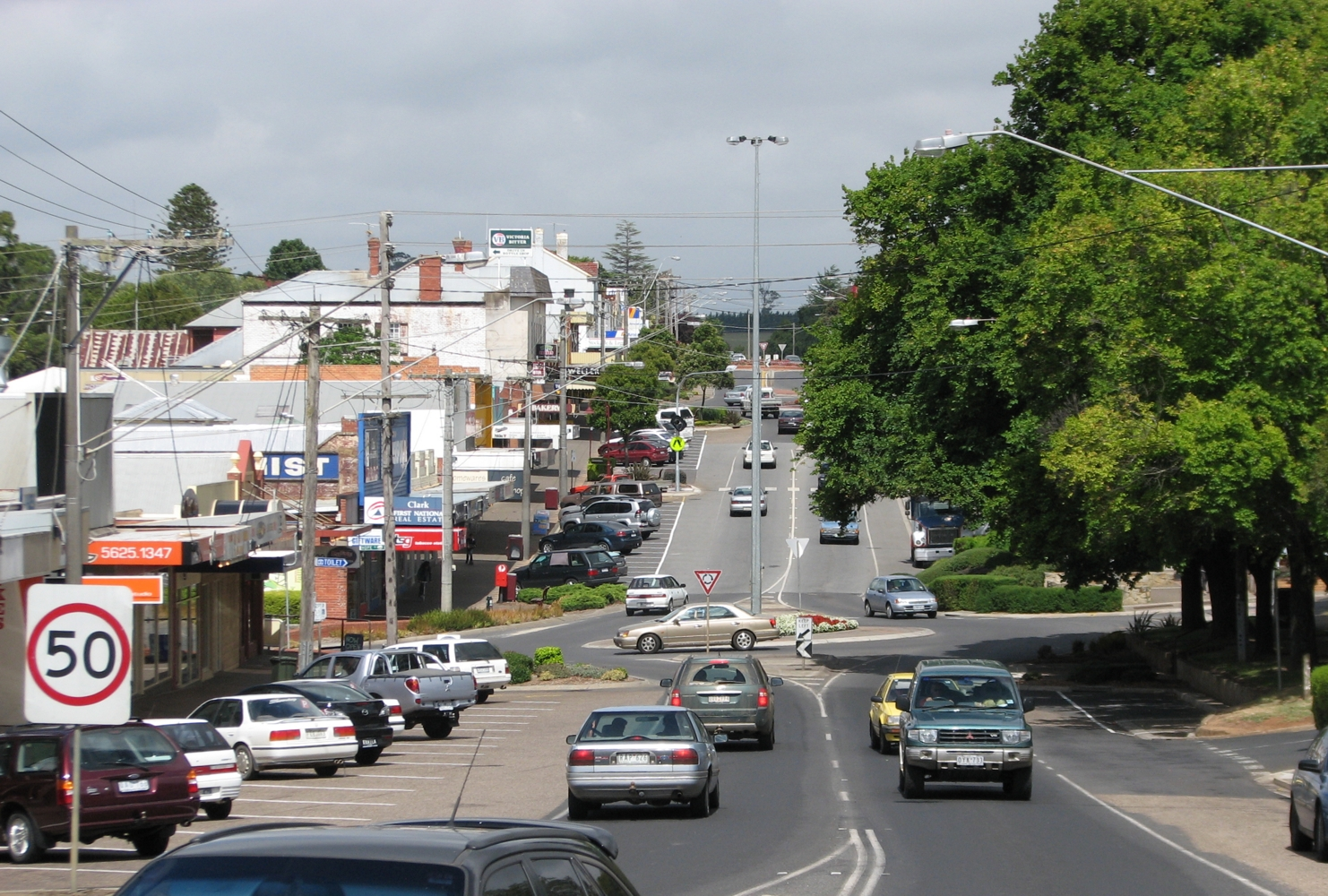
- Main street, 2010

- Coordinates: 38°08′0″S 145°51′0″E
- Country: Australia
- State: Victoria
- LGA: Shire of Baw Baw
- Location: 86 km (53 mi) ESE of Melbourne; 7.4 km (4.6 mi) WNW of Warragul
- Established: 1867

Government
  - State electorate: Narracan
  - Federal division: Monash

Area
  - Total: 52 km^{2} (20 sq mi)

Population
  - Totals: 11,887 (2016 census); 15,287 (2021)
  - Density: 228.6/km^{2} (592/sq mi)
- Postcode: 3818
- County: Buln Buln
- Parish: Drouin West
Localities around Drouin
Labertouche	Robin Hood	Drouin East
Longwarry	Drouin	Warragul
Ripplebrook	Hallora	Lardner

Drouin (/ˈdruːɪn/ DREW-in) is a town in the West Gippsland region, 90 kilometres (56 mi) east of Melbourne in Victoria, Australia. Its local government area is the Shire of Baw Baw, and is home to the shire council's headquarters despite being the second-largest town in the shire, behind neighbouring Warragul. Settlement in this part of Gippsland was rather delayed due to the dense forest. Pastoral runs were taken up but little developed. In 1867, a coach staging station was established on the track into Gippsland on the Old Sale Road at Brandy Creek, later known as Buln Buln about seven kilometres north-east of present Drouin. By the early 1870s, a small settlement had developed and land was being selected in the area.

New housing developments have accelerated the town's residential growth in recent years. As at the 2016 census, Drouin had a population of 11,887 people.

== History ==
The traditional owners of the Drouin area are the Kulin and Kurnai Aboriginal people, who have lived in the area for tens of thousands of years. European settlement in this part of Gippsland was hampered by the dense forest. Pastoral runs were taken up but there was little other development.

In 1867, a coaching station was established at Brandy Creek, on the track into Gippsland, about 7 kilometres (4.3 mi) north-east of present Drouin. By the early 1870s, a small settlement had developed and land was being selected in the area. A post office opened on 5 April 1876, renamed Jindivick in 1878.

Between 1877 and 1879, the Gippsland railway line was constructed, connecting Melbourne with Gippsland. Workers' camps were set up along the route, which ran to the south of Brandy Creek, with three camps in the vicinity of Drouin. The Princes Highway was also constructed to run parallel to the railway, this highway replaced the Old Sale Road as the principal road rout into East Gippsland.

One of the railway camps and a stores depot was located at Drouin Junction. After the Brandy Creek rail section opened in 1878, a township was surveyed at Drouin Junction, soon known as Drouin. The town was named after a French engineer (Derouin) in charge of the camp and depot and employed in the construction of the railway. A post office named Drouin Junction opened on 1 January 1877 and was renamed Drouin in 1878. As Drouin developed, Brandy Creek, now called Buln Buln, had declined. When the Buln Buln Shire was formed in 1878, the administrative centre was located in Drouin. The new Tourists' Guide described the township in 1889, showing its substantial development.

Throughout the 1880s, a number of small sawmills operated in the Drouin district, many transporting their timber by tramway to the Drouin railway station. In the 1890s, a quarry was opened south-east of Drouin, the stone being carried by tramway to a railway siding east of Drouin. In 1913, the quarry was purchased and operated by the shire.

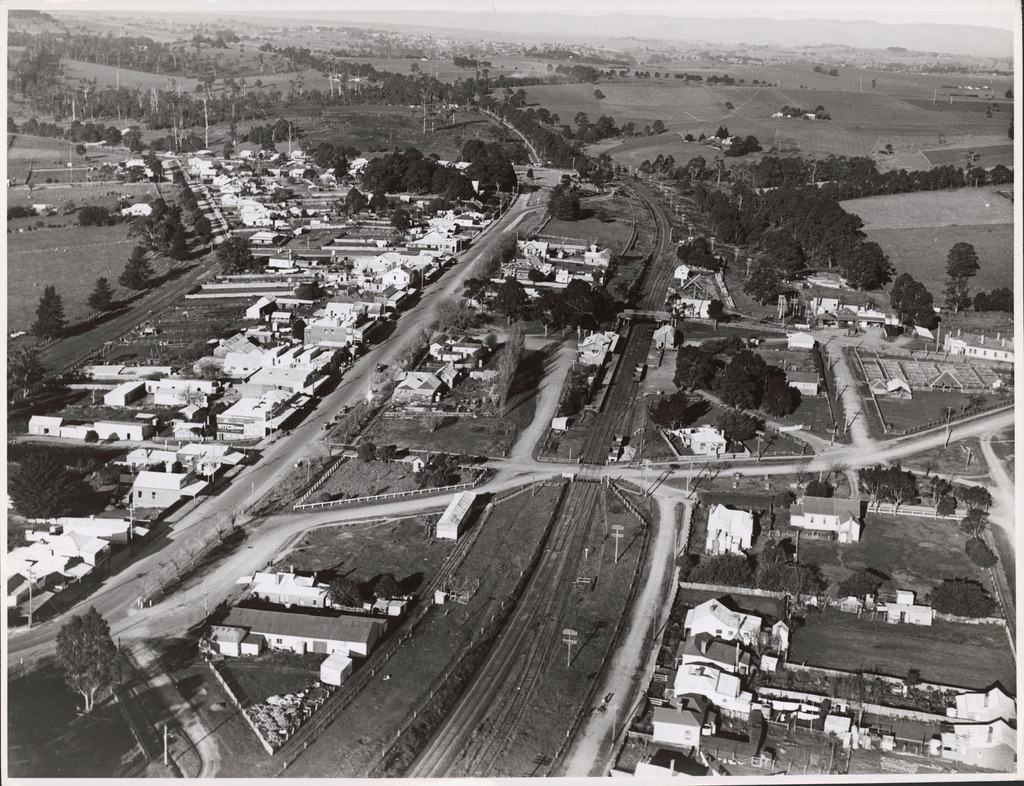
Aerial view of railway and town centre looking east, 1944

As land was cleared, dairy farming became the main industry. Initially, butter and cheese were made on the farm. A creamery operated from 1891 to 1895 and in 1904 a co-operative butter factory was established at Drouin. When this factory was extended in 1907, an electric light plant was installed which also provided light for the streets and homes of Drouin. The factory supplied fresh milk to the Melbourne market from 1915.

Over the years, the company acquired other dairy companies and enlarged its own operation, producing casein, skim milk and butter-oil, as well as butter and cheese. It became part of the Bonlac company, later taken over by Fonterra, which closed the factory, removing the town's biggest employer. Flax was grown around Drouin during the two world wars. A private factory operated for a while and, in 1941, the Australian government constructed a factory to manufacture canvas goods for military use.

In 2010, Drouin began a new period of rapid expansion through new land development. That was due to the re-zoning of land throughout the Drouin-Warragul region to residential use, as well as the growth of the Greater Melbourne region population. The first such development was the Jackson's View Estate, situated north of the centre of the town around McNeilly Park. Over 450 blocks were sold between 2010 and 2020, when the estate was fully sold off. The development was led by the Jackson family and its company, Cartagen Group, formed by businessman Alan Jackson, who was born in Drouin in 1936. The development company sponsored the Drouin Cricket Club for a number of years.

In 1904, the population of Drouin was 700. By 1933, there were just over 1,000 inhabitants and, by 1970, 2,750. From the 1970s, the subdivision of an industrial estate on the south-east edge of the town had encouraged the growth of light industry. A number of housing subdivisions have also been initiated, as well as rural residential subdivision on the fringes of the town.

The construction of the Princes Freeway, which bypassed Drouin, allowed the remodelling of the shopping centre. By 1981, the population was 3,492 and in 1991 was 4,100. The Victorian Municipal Directory described the town in 1994. The town forms part of a combined urban area that includes Warragul. The estimated urban population for this area was 37,928 at June 2018, having grown on average 3.26% year-on-year for the preceding five years.

== Community ==
Drouin holds an annual Ficifolia Festival. Ficifolia are the flowering gum trees which occur throughout the town. The celebration includes the town gathering in the main street of Drouin to watch local schools and participating businesses showcase who they are and what they do. Every year there is a theme which participants in the festival are encouraged to incorporate into their float or costumes. The participants of the parade begin from the Drouin Football Oval, through the main street, and finish at Drouin Civic Park. Here, the town continues its celebration with bands playing in the park, food trucks, rides, market stalls, and finishes with a movie in the park and fireworks.

The town has an Australian rules football team playing in the Gippsland Football League, and a soccer team, Drouin Dragons Soccer Club, playing in the Gippsland Soccer League.

Drouin has a picnic horse-racing club, the Drouin Picnic Racing Club, which holds two race meetings a year, including the Drouin Cup on Boxing Day (26 December). The race track traverses part of the Drouin Golf & Country Club course.

Golfers play at the Drouin Golf and Country Club on Mcglones Road.

Since 1989, Drouin's sister city has been Barrhead, Alberta, Canada.

== Retail ==
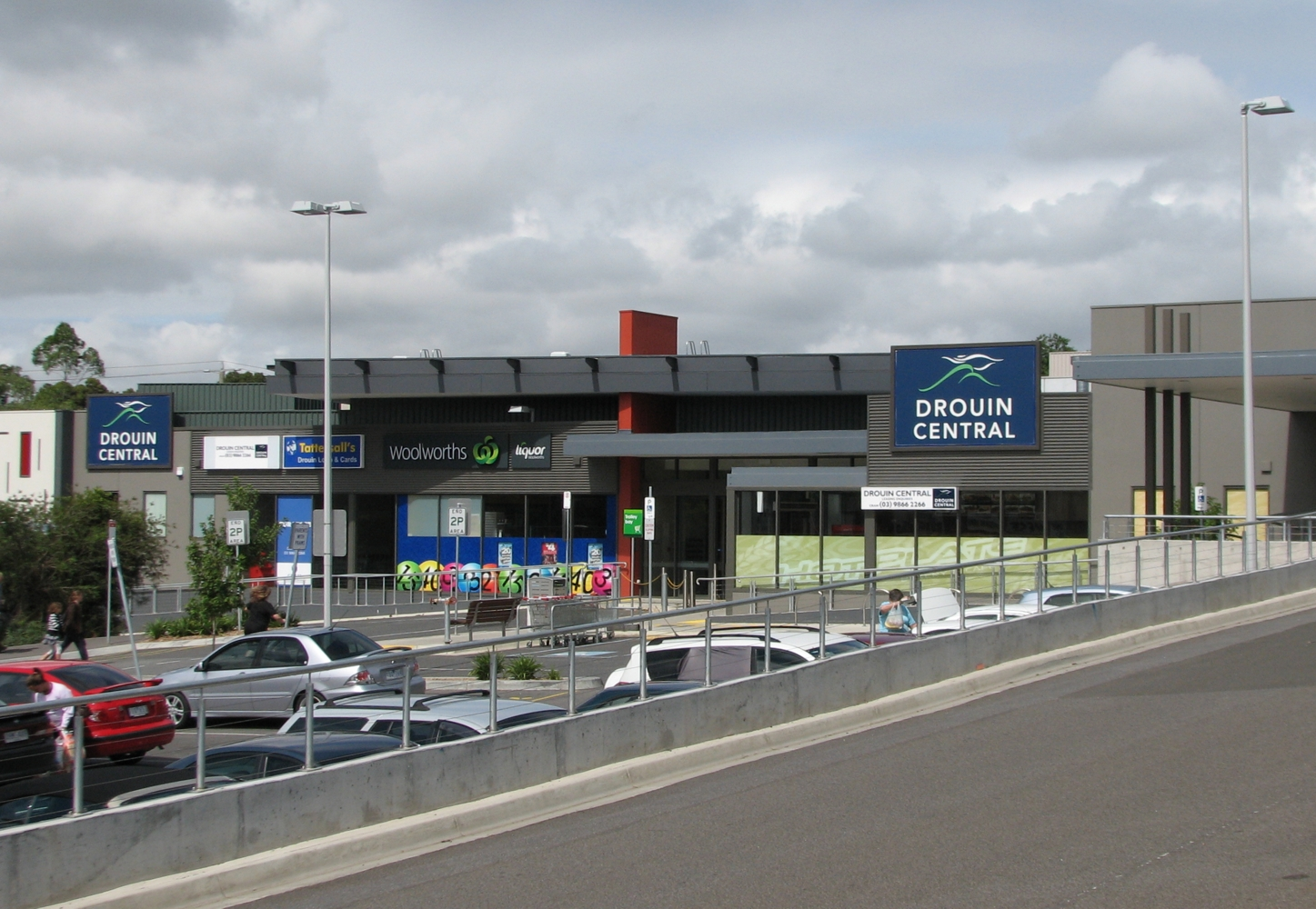
Drouin Central, 2010

Drouin's large retail stores include Woolworths and Coles supermarkets. Other businesses in the town include fast food businesses, hairdressers, restaurants, Tattersall's, and Community Bank—Drouin & District (Bendigo Bank)

Several of the local businesses have relocated in recent times from the southern side of the shopping precinct on Princes Way (next to the railway station), due to land acquisition for the construction of a multi-storey retail shopping complex. Abbey's Cafe closed down, and the long-standing Drouin Cycles moved to a location on the other side of Princes Way.

== Local media ==
=== Newspapers ===
Drouin is served by three local papers—the weekly Warragul and Drouin Gazette, The Trader and the independent monthly and online paper the Warragul & Baw Baw Citizen.

According to the Warragul Regional Newspapers website, The Gazette and The Trader are distributed to locations from as far as Pakenham to Moe and from Poowong to Noojee.

The Warragul Citizen was established in 2011 as a quarterly print paper before becoming bimonthly in 2012, covering Warragul, Drouin and Yarragon. The paper's online news offering started in late 2011 and covers all of Baw Baw. The paper moved to being online-only in 2013, printing its last physical edition in February. It returned to print as a monthly tabloid covering all of Baw Baw in July 2014, changing its name to the Warragul & Baw Baw Citizen.

=== Radio ===
West Gippsland Community Radio (3BBR) is based in Drouin.

The radio reception available in Drouin also includes many of the Melbourne commercial stations (such as 105.1 Triple M, Smooth 91.5, 3AW 693, Nova 100), ABC Radio (774 ABC Melbourne, 96.7 Triple J and 100.7 ABC Gippsland), and Gippsland commercial stations 531 3GG, 94.3 Star FM, 99.5 TRFM and Gold 1242.

=== Television ===
Free-to-air digital television programs from ABC TV, SBS TV, Southern Cross 10, Seven and WIN TV are broadcast to the area from Mount Tassie in the Strzelecki Ranges, 68 km south-east of Drouin. Television transmissions from Mount Dandenong for the Melbourne market (Seven, Nine and Ten) can also be received in Drouin and Warragul with a suitable roof-top antenna.

== Notable people ==
- Jean Battersby (1928–2009) – Arts executive
- Alan Jackson (1936–2018) – Australian businessman and chief executive officer of Nylex and Chairman of Austrade. He and his family built the Jackson's View estate in Drouin during the 2010s.
- Lionel Rose (1948–2011) – former world champion boxer and was the 1968 Australian of the Year from Jackson's Track, just outside Drouin. A statue of Rose was unveiled in 2010 in Warragul's Queen Street Park.
- Gary Ablett Sr. (1961–present) – played for the Geelong Football Club in the AFL, and was named the greatest player in the club's history.
- Lisa Gerrard (1961–present) – singer and composer and Golden Globe winner, resides in Drouin
- Dale Thomas (1987–present) – former AFL footballer
- Cyrus Monk (1996–present) – former Australian U23 Road Cycling Champion and World University Cycling Champion. Currently rides for EvoPro Racing on the European Tour
