= Icy Creek =

Icy Creek Victoria
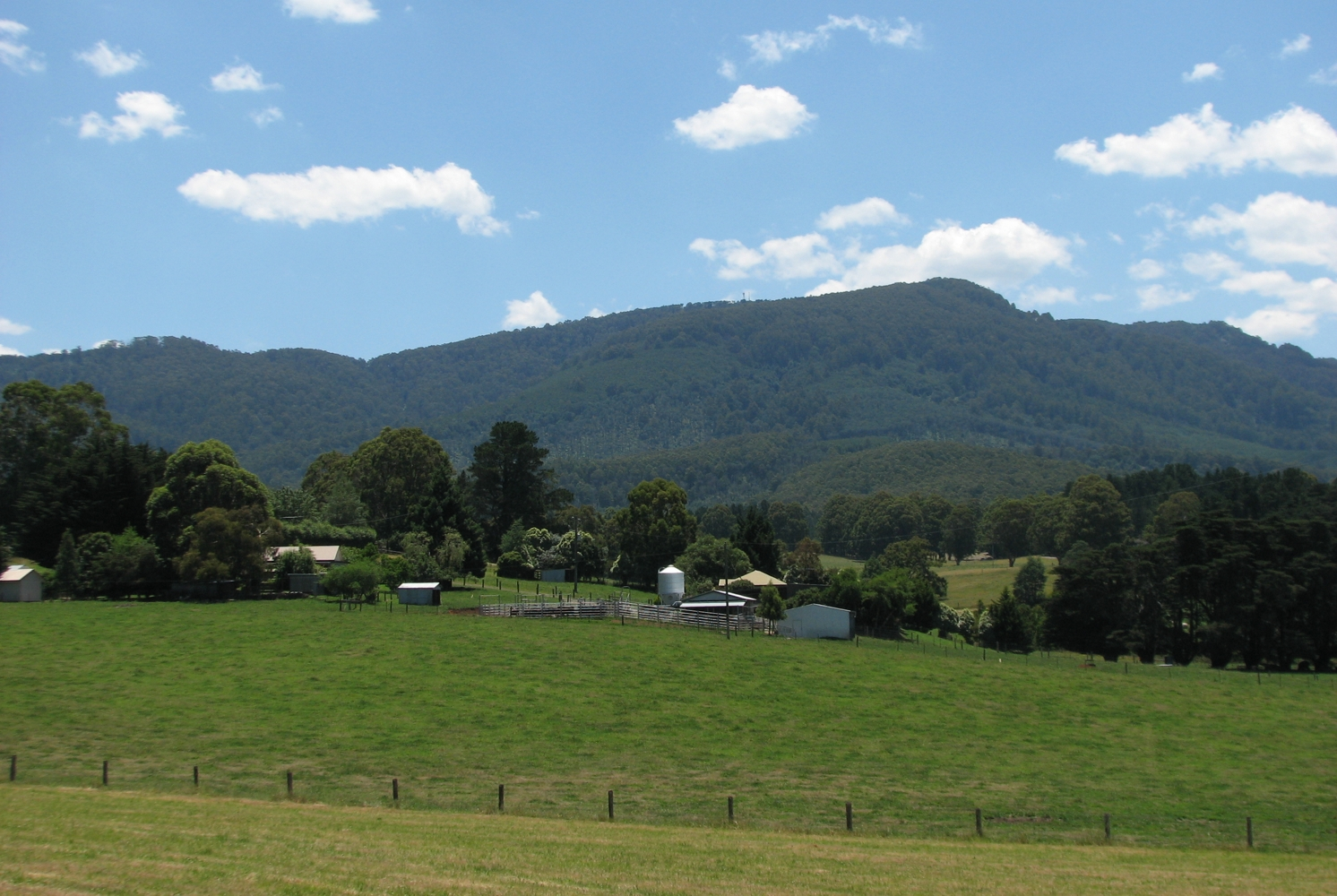

- Coordinates: 37°53′0″S 146°06′0″E
- Population: 28 (SAL 2021)
- Postcode(s): 3833
- Elevation: 547 m (1,795 ft)
- Location: 136 km (85 mi) E of Melbourne; 47 km (29 mi) N of Drouin; 27 km (17 mi) N of Neerim South
- LGA(s): Shire of Baw Baw
- State electorate(s): Narracan
- Federal division(s): Monash

Icy Creek is a locality in Victoria, Australia, located on Mount Baw Baw Road, in the Shire of Baw Baw at an elevation of 547 metres (1,795 ft) above sea level.

Icy Creek Post Office opened on 1 December 1934 and closed in 1968.
