= Toorongo Falls Reserve =

Coordinates: 37°50′57″S 146°2′46″E

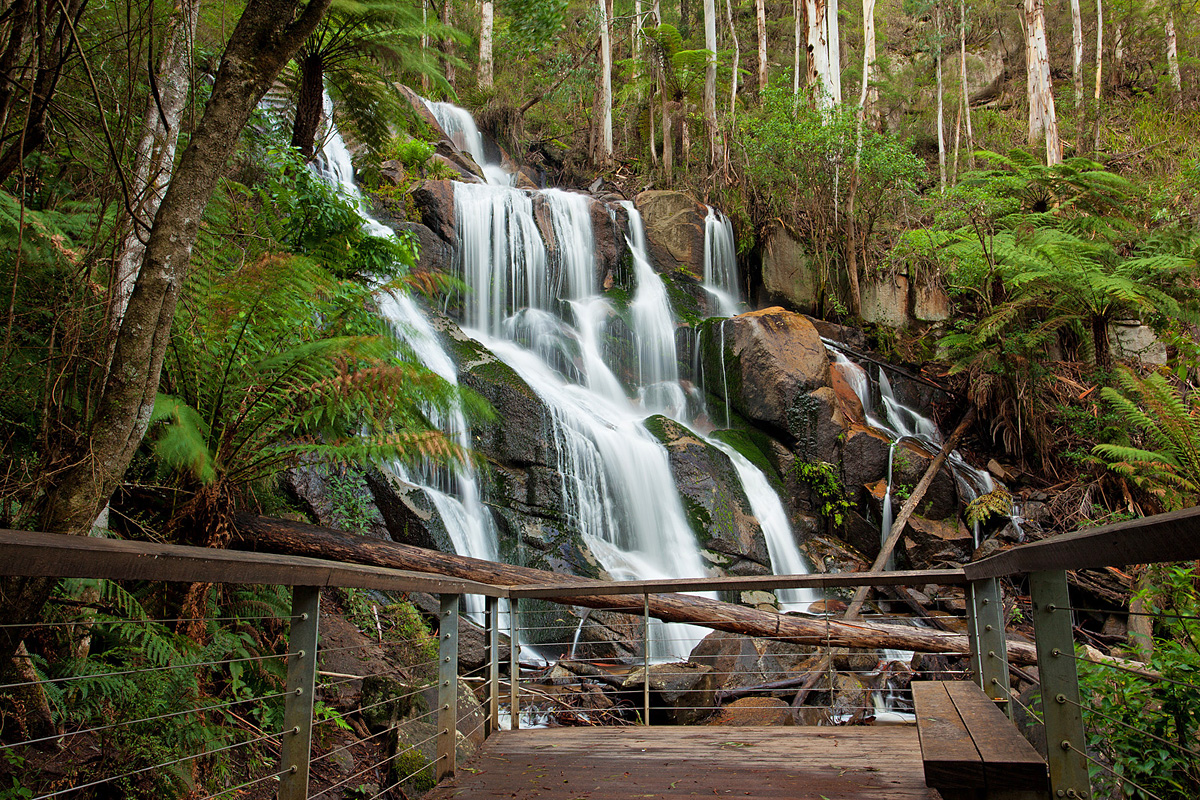
Viewing platform for the Toorongo Falls

The Toorongo Falls Reserve protects two waterfalls, Amphitheatre Falls on the Toorongo River and Toorongo Falls on the Little Toorongo River, including the confluence of those two rivers, in West Gippsland, Victoria, Australia. It is located approximately 6 kilometres (3.7 mi) north-east of the town of Noojee, approximately 100 kilometres (62 mi) east of Melbourne.

== Flora and fauna ==
The Reserve is home to wet forest types, including mountain grey gum, mountain ash, manna gum, blackwood and Austral mulberry. A variety of ferns thrive in the damp conditions including the necklace fern, soft tree fern, and the long fork-fern.

Animals found in the reserve include common and mountain brushtail possum, ringtail possum, sugar glider, and a variety of bats. Red-bellied black snakes are commonly found during warmer periods.

== Waterfalls ==
The Toorongo Falls in the Toorongo Falls Reserve.

=== Walking tracks ===
The reserve contains two bush walking tracks, which total 2.22 kilometres, taking a loop around the two waterfalls, and allowing the visitors to take the wide range of native experiences the area has to offer.

== History ==
The area is close to a border of two Aboriginal tribes, but is not included within any Registered Aboriginal Party boundary. The Wurundjeri are to the west, and part of the Kulin nation and the Braiakaulung, part of the Gunai Nation, are to the east. There is purported evidence of Aboriginal heritage, with some culturally significant sites being situated in the reserve.

== See also ==
- List of waterfalls
- List of waterfalls in Australia
