= Rokeby, Victoria =

Rokeby Victoria
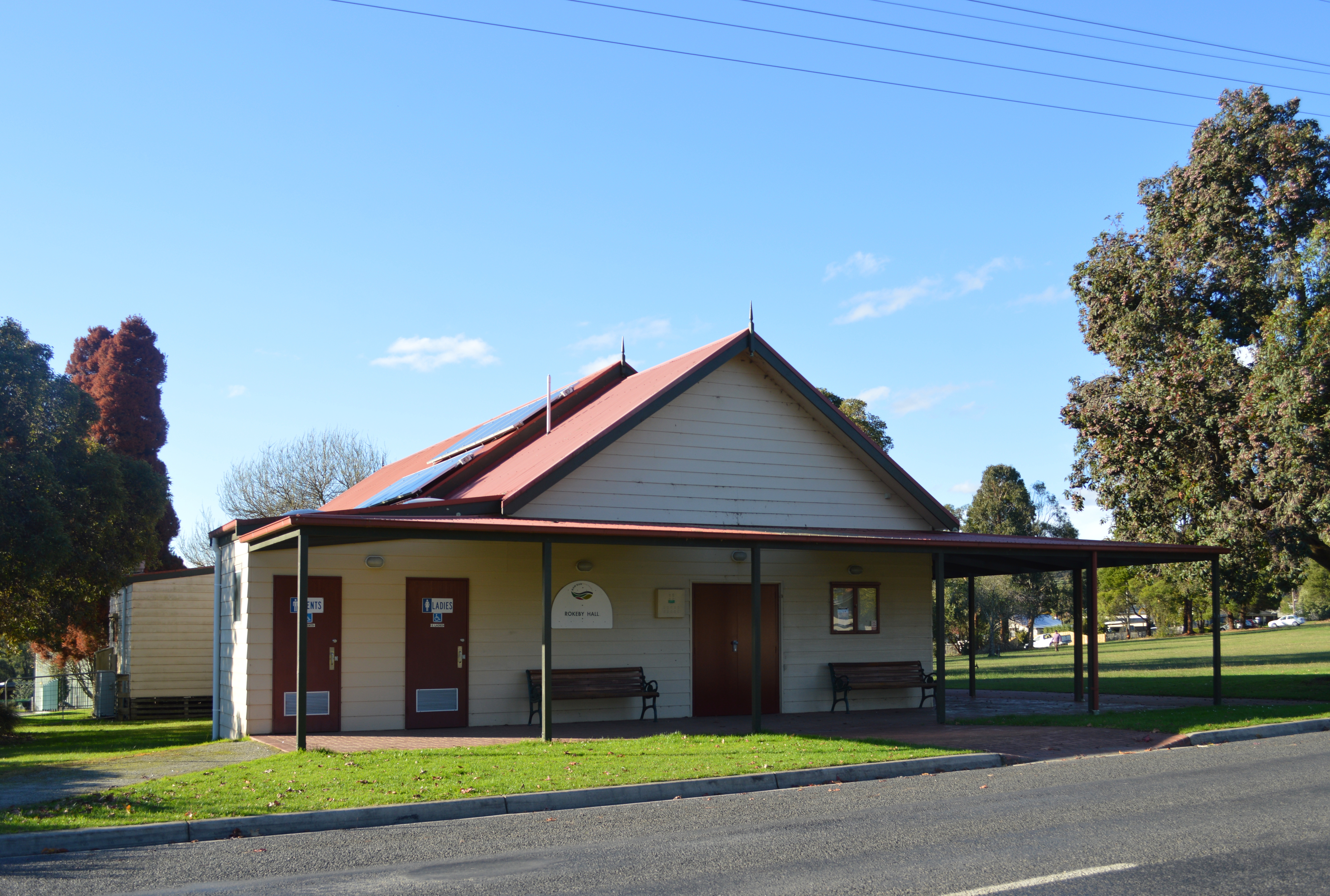
- Rokeby Hall

- Coordinates: 38°04′S 145°56′E
- Population: 213 (SAL 2021)
- Postcode(s): 3821
- Location: 100 km (62 mi) E of Melbourne; 9 km (6 mi) N of Warragul; 8 km (5 mi) S of Neerim South
- LGA(s): Shire of Baw Baw
- State electorate(s): Narracan
- Federal division(s): Monash

Rokeby is a town in West Gippsland, Victoria, Australia. It is near the towns of Warragul and Neerim South, 100 kilometres (62 mi) east of the state capital, Melbourne.

Rokeby Post Office opened on 20 May 1892 and closed in 1981.
