= Neerim North =

- Town
- Coordinates: 37°55′0″S 146°00′0″E
- Country: Australia
- State: Victoria
- LGA(s): Shire of Baw Baw
- Location: 125 km (78 mi) E of Melbourne; 36 km (22 mi) N of Drouin; 16 km (9.9 mi) N of Neerim South

Government
  - State electorate(s): Narracan
  - Federal division(s): Monash

Population
  - Total(s): 41 (SAL 2021)
- Postcode: 3821

Neerim North is a locality in Victoria, Australia, located on Neerim North Road, in the Shire of Baw Baw.

Neerim North Post Office opened on 25 September 1892 and closed in 1971.
