= Mount Baw Baw =

Mountain in Victoria, Australia

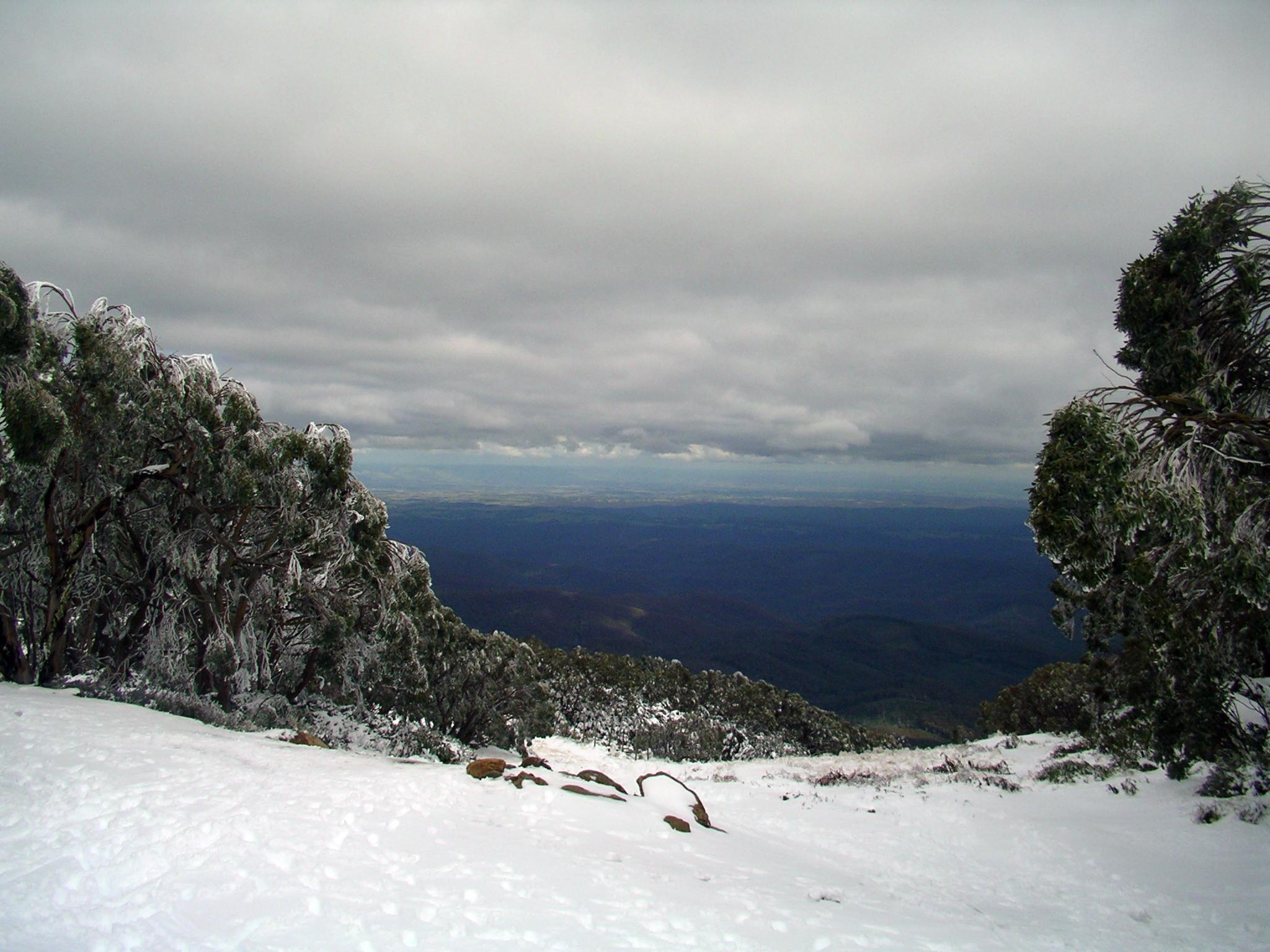
- The view south across Gippsland from Mount Baw Baw

Highest point
- Elevation: 1,567 metres (5,141 ft) AHD
- Coordinates: 37°50′22″S 146°16′33″E

Geography
- Location within Baw Baw Shire
- Location: Victoria, Australia
- Parent range: Baw Baw Plateau, Great Dividing Range

Climbing
- Easiest route: Hike/ski

Mount Baw Baw (/ˈbɔː ˈbɔː/) is a mountain summit on the Baw-Baw Plateau of the Great Dividing Range, located in Gippsland, Victoria, Australia. The name is from the Yarra-Yallou, Gunna-Kurnai people of Gippsland. It is of uncertain meaning, but possibly signifies, echo, or ghost.

The Mount Baw Baw Alpine Resort is an unincorporated area, that includes the Mt Baw Baw summit, which is under the direct administration of the government of Victoria, and is surrounded by the Baw Baw National Park, in the Shire of Baw Baw.

== Location ==
Mount Baw Baw is about 120 kilometres (75 miles) east of Melbourne, 50 km (31 mi) on the north side the Latrobe Valley, due North of Moe. Mount Baw Baw itself is one of a number of peaks on the Baw Baw Plateau, a long plateau tending about 20 km north-east and is about 10 km wide. Other peaks on the plateau include Mount Mueller, Mount Whitelaw, Talbot Peak, Mount St Phillack, Mount Tyers, Mount Kernot and Mount St Gwinear. The plateau itself is isolated from most of Victoria's high country by the deep valleys of the Thomson and Aberfeldy rivers and tributaries of the La Trobe River, including the Tanjil and Tyers rivers to the south.

== Geology and biology ==
The Baw Baw massif consists of a late Devonian granodiorite pluton. There is relatively little relief on the plateau itself, the highest point reaching 1,567 metres (5,141 feet). The lower slopes of the plateau are covered in montane eucalypt forest and tall forest, and creek valleys have cool temperate rainforest of myrtle beech, Nothofagus cunninghamii. Above 1,200 m (3,900 ft) snow gum (Eucalyptus pauciflora) woodland occurs. There is no altitudinal treeline limit; subalpine grasslands and shrublands occur in flat valley bottoms on the plateau as a result of cold-air drainage. Much of this subalpine zone is included in the 133 km^{2} (51 sq mi) Baw Baw National Park. The Baw Baw Village ski resort is technically outside the national park.

The climate of the plateau itself is subalpine, with an average annual precipitation of 1,900 mm (75 in). Snow covers the plateau from June to September.

It is thought that Baron Ferdinand von Mueller made the first recorded European ascent of Baw Baw in 1860, naming Christmas Creek on one of his major collecting expeditions. It was on this trip that he collected the Baw Baw Berry, Wittsteinia vacciniacea. There are two routes up the mountain; one via Noojee and Icy Creek which is very winding, and the unsealed South Face Road via Erica.

Mount Baw Baw is home to the critically endangered Baw Baw Frog.

== Climate ==
Mount Baw Baw has a Subpolar oceanic climate (Cfc). The mountain summit receives more annual precipitation than most places in mainland Australia, with frequent and heavy snow between May and October but can occur at any time of the year (as well as a persistent snowpack). Frequent, heavy cloud cover and strong winds mean that minimum temperatures rarely drop below −5 °C (23 °F), whereas maximum temperatures are frequently at or below 0 °C (32 °F); the mountain is often shrouded in low cloud or mist in winter, reducing diurnal range. The mean afternoon humidity of 80%, is extreme (especially for a mainland Australian region).

Summers are cool with temperatures rarely rising above 25 °C (77 °F); summers can also be very cold, with a maximum temperature of just −0.4 °C (31.3 °F) recorded on 25 December 2006, and 1.0 °C (33.8 °F) on both 11 January 2012 and 16 February 1998. During the 2009 Victorian heatwave most of the state saw highs of above 45 °C (113 °F), while the temperature on Mount Baw Baw's summit reached a comparatively cool maximum of just 31.3 °C (88.3 °F).

Climate data for Mount Baw Baw (1997–2025); 1,561 m AMSL; 37.84° S, 146.27° E
Month	Jan	Feb	Mar	Apr	May	Jun	Jul	Aug	Sep	Oct	Nov	Dec	Year
Record high °C (°F)	30.9 (87.6)	31.3 (88.3)	26.2 (79.2)	20.6 (69.1)	16.2 (61.2)	12.6 (54.7)	10.0 (50.0)	13.1 (55.6)	16.7 (62.1)	21.2 (70.2)	26.0 (78.8)	27.7 (81.9)	31.3 (88.3)
Mean daily maximum °C (°F)	17.5 (63.5)	16.5 (61.7)	14.1 (57.4)	10.0 (50.0)	6.4 (43.5)	3.4 (38.1)	2.3 (36.1)	3.1 (37.6)	5.8 (42.4)	8.9 (48.0)	12.1 (53.8)	14.5 (58.1)	9.5 (49.2)
Mean daily minimum °C (°F)	8.8 (47.8)	8.1 (46.6)	6.5 (43.7)	4.0 (39.2)	1.5 (34.7)	−0.6 (30.9)	−1.5 (29.3)	−1.4 (29.5)	−0.1 (31.8)	1.7 (35.1)	4.1 (39.4)	5.9 (42.6)	3.1 (37.6)
Record low °C (°F)	−2.0 (28.4)	−1.4 (29.5)	−2.2 (28.0)	−5.7 (21.7)	−5.8 (21.6)	−7.0 (19.4)	−6.6 (20.1)	−8.5 (16.7)	−6.3 (20.7)	−6.4 (20.5)	−4.5 (23.9)	−3.1 (26.4)	−8.5 (16.7)
Average precipitation mm (inches)	97.6 (3.84)	92.7 (3.65)	109.0 (4.29)	142.5 (5.61)	123.8 (4.87)	156.0 (6.14)	175.0 (6.89)	172.3 (6.78)	162.1 (6.38)	158.5 (6.24)	167.5 (6.59)	137.5 (5.41)	1,677.7 (66.05)
Average precipitation days (≥ 0.2 mm)	12.4	11.6	13.5	15.0	15.0	16.3	19.6	19.3	16.4	16.8	16.1	14.8	186.8
Average afternoon relative humidity (%)	71	73	75	81	83	88	89	87	85	82	77	73	80
Source: Australian Government Bureau of Meteorology

== Ski resort ==
The summit is located within the boundaries of the Mount Baw Baw Alpine Resort, an unincorporated area of Victoria. There are about 30 hectares (74 acres) of mainly beginner-intermediate ski runs. Seven lifts service a variety of runs, with the highest going almost to the top of Mount Baw Baw with a 91 m (299 ft) rise. The resort village is at the bottom of the lifts, offering ski in-ski out access. In addition to the downhill runs there are a number of cross country trails offering access to other parts of the Baw Baw plateau. Like most lower-lying Australian ski resorts, snow cover varies greatly from year to year, but is regularly available for the local ski season from about July to the end of September.

The alpine resort village has modern facilities and caters for both day-trippers and long-term visitors, with accommodation, ski hire, food outlets, medical and information centres all within walking distance of the car parks.

== Walking ==
During the summer months, Mt Baw Baw is popular for hiking and bushwalking given its location in the Baw Baw National Park. The alpine grasses are blanketed with wildflowers and walks at a higher elevation pass through snow gum forest.

Popular walks include the Great Walhalla Alpine Trail, which starts at the gold mining town of Walhalla and finishes at the Mt Baw Baw Alpine Resort. The hike is the first 40 km (25 mi) of the Australian Alps Walking Track. The Mt Baw Baw Summit Walk arrives at the highest peak of the Baw Baw plateau, elevation 1564m. Situated at the summit is the historic cairn used as a survey reference in 1903.

== Cycling ==
The access road to the resort, the Mount Baw Baw Tourist Road, features one of the toughest climbs accessible by road bicycles in Australia. The final climb of 6.2 km (3.9 mi) rises 718 m (2,356 ft) at an average grade of 11.5%, maxing out at 20.3%. The climb is not as long as, but considerably steeper than, any of the hors catégorie climbs featured in the Tour de France. The Mount Baw Baw Classic, which began in 2001, is an annual cycling race held by the Warragul Cycling Club, and ends at the Mount Baw Baw village.

=== Downhill mountain biking ===
There is a purpose-built downhill track located on the south western side of the mountain, facing towards the sea. The course has hosted the Victorian Downhill Championships as well as a number of state rounds. The track is around 3 1/2 min in duration, comprising a good mix of cambered dirt, rocks, fire road and technical sections. A shuttle service is provided from the base of the track along the Mount Baw Baw Tourist Road back to the Baw Baw Village, so that the venue is very mountain bike friendly.

== See also ==
- Alpine National Park
- List of mountains in Australia § Victoria
- List of reduplicated Australian place names
- Skiing in Australia
