= Baw Baw National Park =

National park in Victoria, Australia

- IUCN category II (national park)
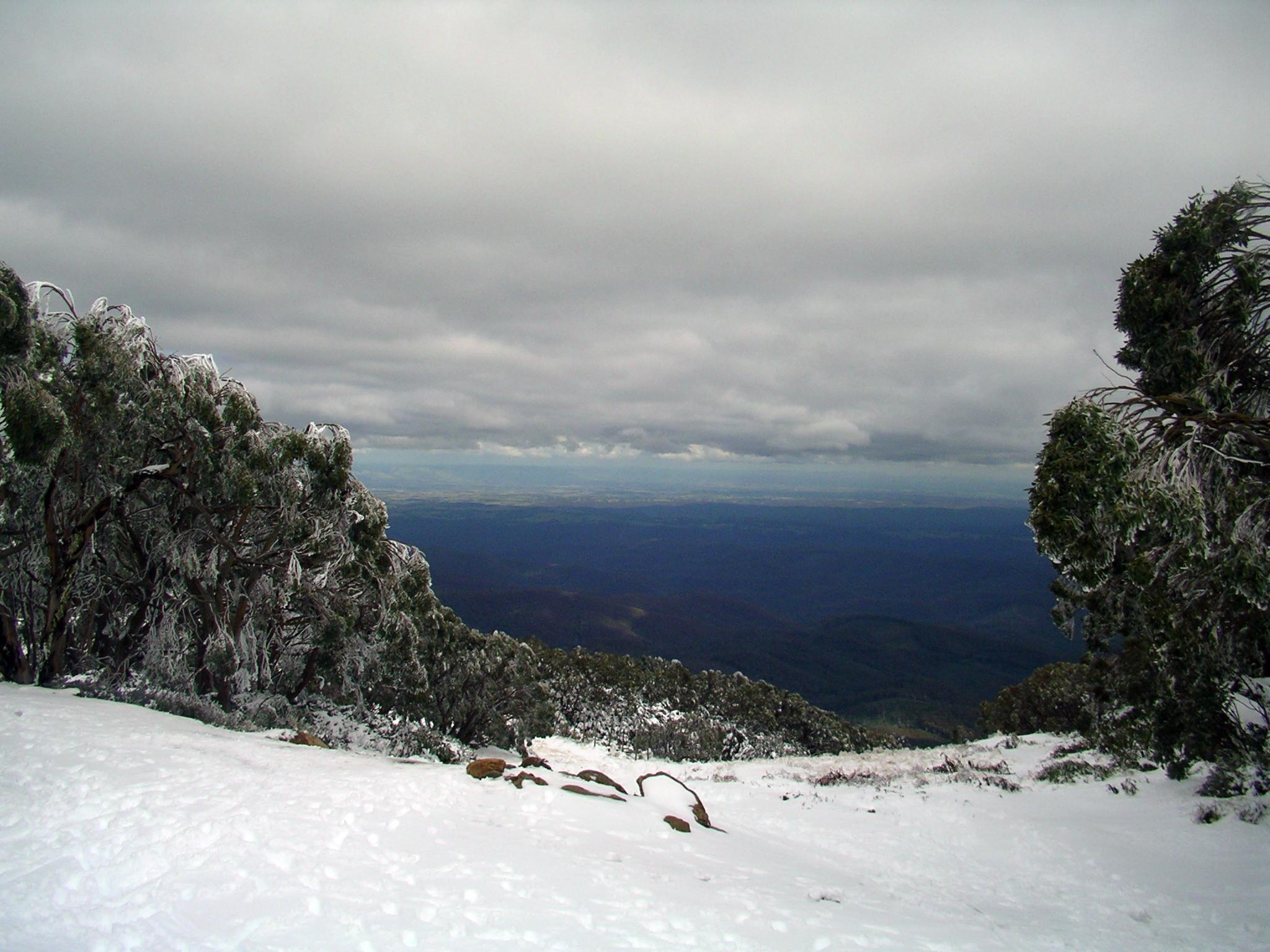
- The view from Mount Baw Baw looking east across the Gippsland, in autumn 2006.

- Location within Victoria
- Location: Victoria
- Nearest city: Rawson
- Coordinates: 37°45′50″S 146°13′23″E
- Area: 135.3 km^{2} (52.2 sq mi)
- Established: April 1979
- Governing body: Parks Victoria
- Website: https://www.parks.vic.gov.au/places-to-see/parks/baw-baw-national-park

The Baw Baw National Park (/ˈbɔː ˈbɔː/) is a national park located on the boundary between the Victorian Alps and Gippsland regions of Victoria, Australia. The 13,530-hectare (33,400-acre) national park is situated approximately 120 kilometres (75 mi) east of Melbourne and 50 kilometres (31 mi) north of the Latrobe Valley. The park contains the forest covered Baw-Baw Plateau and surrounds the Mount Baw Baw Alpine Resort.

The Baw-Baw Plateau has a number of peaks, that includes Mount Baw Baw, Mount St Gwinear, Mount St Phillack, Mount Erica and Mount Whitelaw; all largely subalpine terrane outcrops of weathered granite boulders rising from the plateau, which is covered by a forest of snow-gums, punctuated by meadows. Mount St Phillack, a granite hill on the Baw-Baw plateau standing at 1,566 metres (5,138 ft) above sea level is the park's highest peak as the slightly higher Mt Baw Baw peak is part of the ski resort area. The slopes of the plateau within the national park form the catchment areas for the Thomson River and the Thomson Reservoir, and the Tanjil and Tyers rivers.

== History ==
The traditional custodians of the land surrounding Baw Baw National Park are the Wurundjeri people of the Kulin nation. Through their cultural traditions, the Gunaikurnai people identify the Baw Baw National Park as their traditional country.

The area was first explored by Europeans in 1860 by botanist Ferdinand von Mueller, and he named the peaks Mount Mueller and Mount Erica after himself. Mueller also used this trip as a way to clarify his theories about the similarities and differences in vegetation in Tasmania and Victoria. The area was settled in the 1880s and 1890s, after the discovery of gold in the area. Baw Baw National Park was declared in April 1979. On 7 November 2008 the park was added to the Australian National Heritage List as one of eleven areas constituting the Australian Alps National Parks and Reserves. The Baw Baw National Park represents the southerly extent of the sub-alpine environment on mainland Australia.

== Geography ==
Baw Baw typically consists of regions with low lying grasses, snow gums, and heathlands. The Australian Alps also have a magnitude of mushroom rock, as well as giant granite towering over the forest.

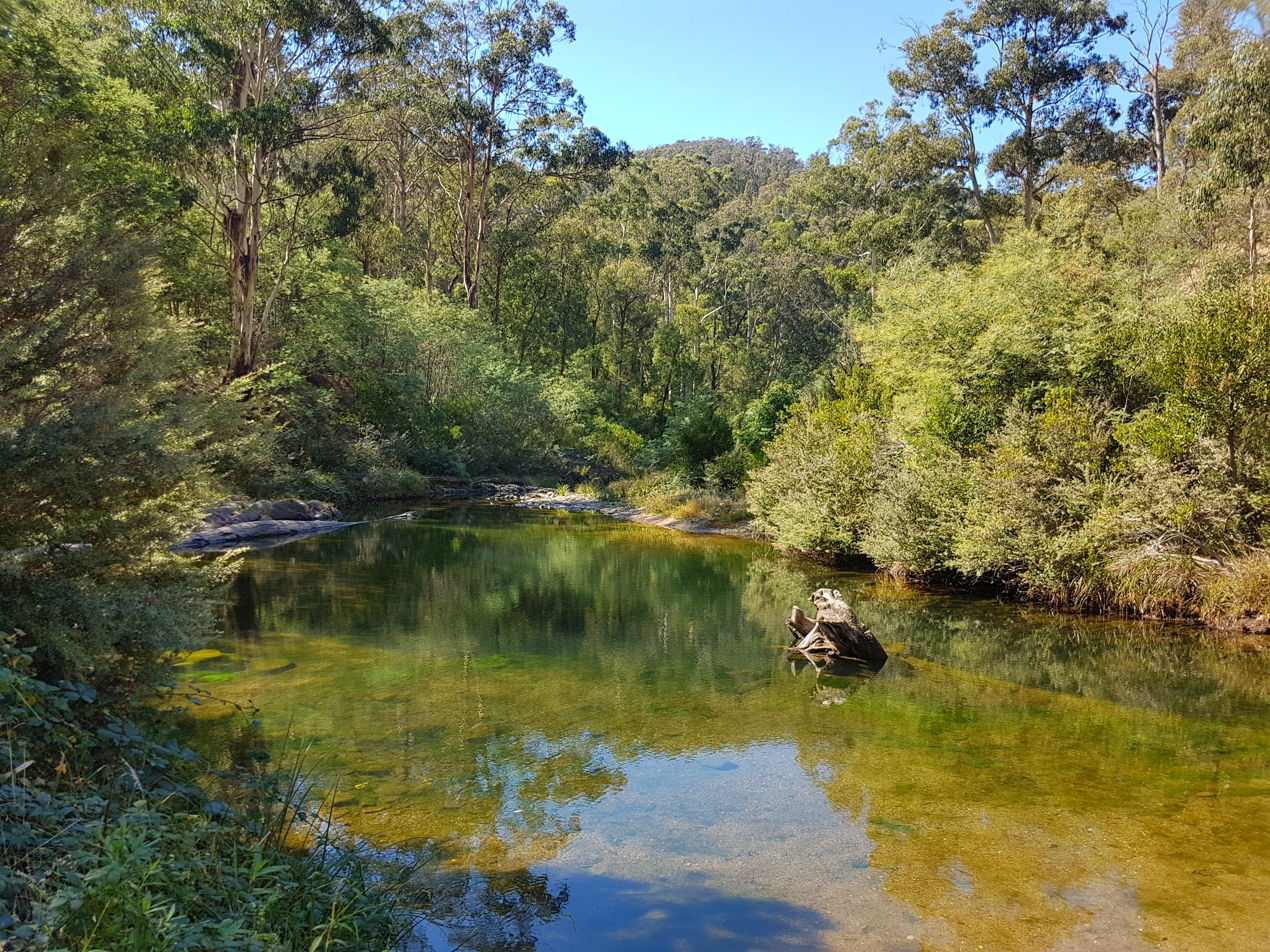
Aberfeldy River, Baw Baw National Park

== Flora and fauna ==
The typical vegetation in the park is low-lying grasses, heathlands and snow gums, this is typically described as sub-alpine. Fauna abounds on the foothills to Baw Baw Plateau, including Leadbeater's possum, which is now critically endangered as of 2015, due to the "Saturday Bushfires" impact on their population and habitat. The Leadbeater's possum is also Victoria's state fauna emblem. The critically endangered Baw Baw frog (Philoria frosti), listed on the IUCN Red List, population has started to disappear from its earlier range, and is now limited to a small range on the Mount Baw Baw Plateau.

The deciduous Baw Baw berry (Wittsteinia vacciniacea) may be found on the plateau. It is a red and yellow flower species, and is the only species of Wittsteinia in Australia. It is also one of four genera in the Alseuosmiaceae family. The berry is scattered throughout the mountainous region of Victoria, and its population within these regions vary.

The Epracis breviflora, or drumstick heaths flowering time is from November to January. This flower is native to the Baw Baw Plateau, and also occasionally found in moist crevices in rocks on the mountain as well.

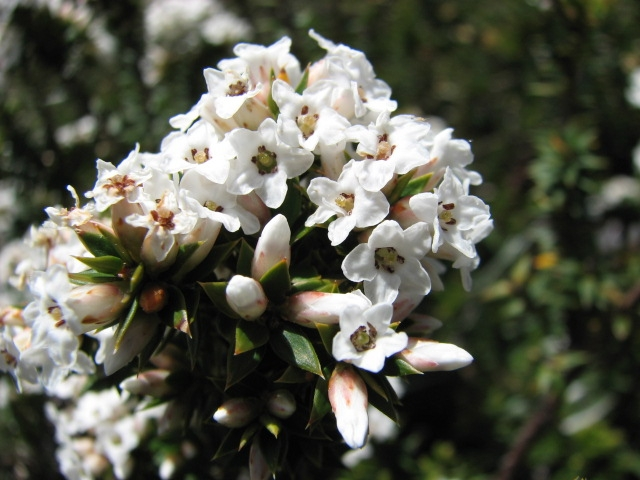
The native flower, Epacris breviflora

== Climate ==
The overnight temperature minimums fall between 6 and 13 degrees Celsius on average. The mean annual rainfall in this region is 606–2344 mm, with a monthly average minimum of 44–126 mm, and a monthly average maximum of 63–295 mm

== Etymology ==
The national park draws its name from Mount Baw Baw. In the Australian Aboriginal Woiwurrung language the name for the mountain was thought to be variously bo-ye, meaning "ghost"; or bo-bo, meaning bandicoot. In the Bunurong language, the mountain was thought to be named Bore Bore and in the Gunai language, Bo Bo, both meaning "echo".

== Activities ==
The major uses of the park are skiing in winter and bushwalking in summer. It is popular for cross country skiing, downhill skiing, summer bushwalking, rafting and canoeing, fishing, scenic drives and picnics. The Australian Alps Walking Track traverses its entire length, starting at Walhalla and continuing north towards the Alpine National Park. The Baw Baw section takes a bit less than three days to walk with plenty to see for those interested in botany or geology.

There is popular ski touring along the Baw Baw Plateau between Mount Baw Baw, past Mount St Phillack to Mount St Gwinear. There is a volunteer ski patrol group who run on weekends and patrol around the St Gwinear portion of the national park. They access the park from the opposite side of the plateau to the ski resort at Mount Baw Baw. Other popular skiing is Nordic skiing at Mount Baw Baw, introduced in 1972 including championship races and a ski school.

== See also ==
- Australian Alps National Parks and Reserves
- List of reduplicated Australian place names
- Protected areas of Victoria
