= Rawson, Victoria =

Rawson
- Town

- Coordinates: 37°57′S 146°24′E
- Country: Australia
- State: Victoria
- LGA: Shire of Baw Baw
- Location: 171 km (106 mi) E of Melbourne; 37 km (23 mi) N of Moe

Government
  - State electorate: Narracan
  - Federal division: Monash

Population
  - Total: 296 (2016 census)
- Postcode: 3825

Rawson is a town in Victoria, Australia, located on Tyers - Thomson Valley Road, in the Shire of Baw Baw. The town was established for workers involved in the construction of the Thomson Dam, which was completed in 1983, Rawson Post Office opening on 17 April 1979.

The first buildings were constructed in 1977. They were initially named Robertson after Alan Robertson.

The history of the town and surrounding area is the focus of the Erica and District Historical Society, located in the old Rawson Police Station.

At the 2016 census, Rawson had a population of 296.

On 4 October 2021, a 2.9-magnitude earth tremor was felt in Rawson at approximately 11:11 p.m.

Rawson may be a holiday destination for residents of Melbourne for activities such as bushwalking, hiking, 4WD exploration, mountain biking, trout fishing, whitewater adventuring, historical exploration, cross-country skiing, gold fossicking, deer hunting, and trail bike riding.
