= Noojee =

- Town
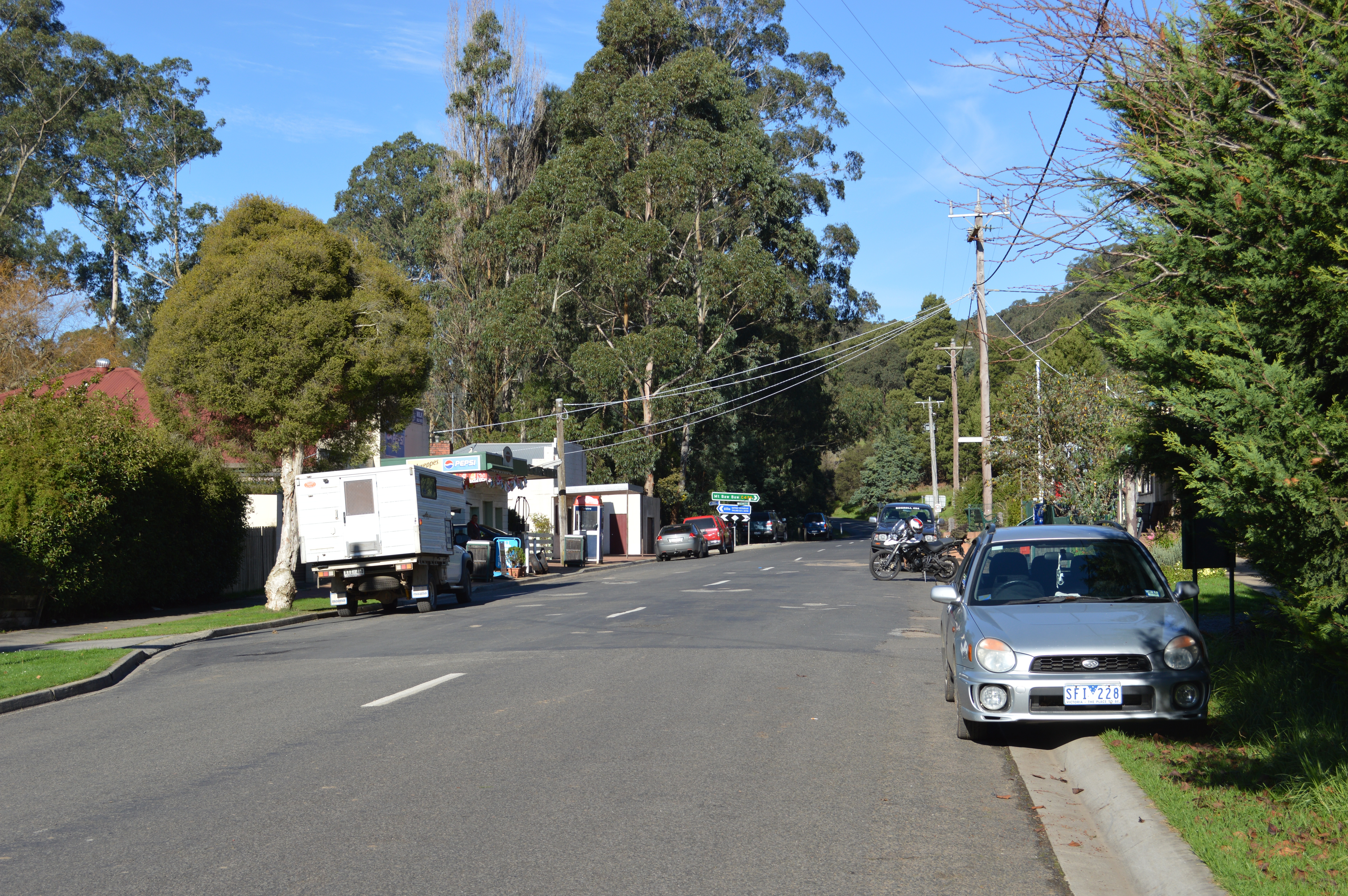
- Bennett Street

- Coordinates: 37°53′0″S 146°00′0″E
- Country: Australia
- State: Victoria
- LGA: Shire of Baw Baw
- Location: 128 km (80 mi) E of Melbourne; 38 km (24 mi) N of Warragul; 20 km (12 mi) N of Neerim South

Government
  - State electorate: Narracan
  - Federal division: Monash
- Elevation: 275 m (902 ft)

Population
  - Total: 157 (2016 census)
- Postcode: 3833
- County: Buln Buln
- Mean max temp: 18.4 °C (65.1 °F)
- Mean min temp: 7.1 °C (44.8 °F)
- Annual rainfall: 1,116.3 mm (43.95 in)
Localities around Noojee
Warburton Powelltown	McMahons Creek	Erica
Hoddles Creek	Noojee	Tanjil Bren
Labertouche	Neerim Junction	Hill End

Noojee is a town in the Gippsland region of Victoria, Australia, north of Warragul and east of Melbourne, in the Baw Baw local government area. At the 2016 census, Noojee and the surrounding area had a population of 157. The town benefits from tourists passing through to the Mount Baw Baw Alpine Resort, 48 kilometres away, as it is the last stop with tourism services. There are also a number of walks in the area, including the Noojee Trestle Bridge, a 100m wooden rail bridge.

== History ==
"Noojee" is an Aboriginal word meaning "valley of or place of rest".

It was first settled after gold was found in the area in the 1860s. Noojee became a major timber town when the railway connected the town to Warragul in 1919. Noojee Post Office opened on 3 May 1920, though an earlier office had been open between 1902 and 1904.

The town was destroyed by bushfires in 1926 and again in the Black Friday fires of 1939. The only building left standing after both fires was the Noojee Hotel which served as community meeting point during the emergency. The hotel also served as the school after the one room school was destroyed.

== Economy ==
Noojee is well known for its trout fishing. A trout farm is located on the outskirts of the town.

== See also ==
- Toorongo Falls Reserve
