= Erica, Victoria =

Erica Victoria
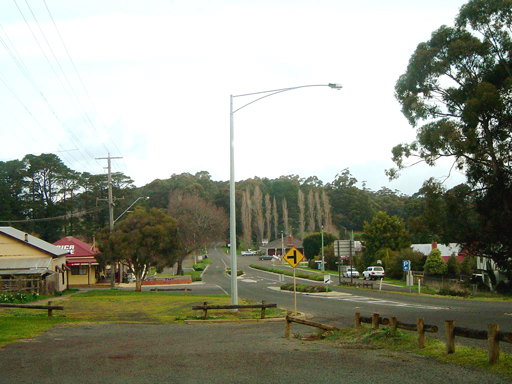
- The township of Erica

- Coordinates: 37°59′0″S 146°22′0″E
- Population: 184 (SAL 2021)
- Postcode(s): 3825
- Elevation: 445 m (1,460 ft)
- Location: 170 km (106 mi) E of Melbourne; 36 km (22 mi) N of Moe; 23 km (14 mi) SW of Walhalla
- LGA(s): Shire of Baw Baw
- State electorate(s): Narracan
- Federal division(s): Monash
Mean max temp	Mean min temp	Annual rainfall
16.7 °C; 62 °F	7.9 °C; 46 °F	1,104.6 mm 43.5 in
Localities around Erica:
McMahons Creek	Woods Point	Glenmaggie
Tanjil Bren	Erica	Heyfield
Moondarra	Tyers	Glengarry

Erica is a town in Victoria, Australia, on Rawson Road, in the Shire of Baw Baw.

The area was generally known as Upper Moondarra in the early 1900s, the township of Erica beginning to grow after construction of the railway line from Moe to Walhalla, which passed through the area. When the station opened in 1910 it was named Harris, but had been renamed Erica after a nearby mountain by 1914. As a consequence, the Post Office opened on 14 July 1910 as Upper Moondarra and was renamed Erica in 1914.

The township of Erica lived mainly from forestry and agriculture, and owing to Walhalla's decline by the 1920s was the largest town on the Moe-Walhalla railway. The section of line past Erica closed to traffic in 1944, save for occasional goods services to Platina station, and the line from Moe to Erica closed completely in 1954.

The Erica Court of Petty Sessions closed in 1968.

Erica still maintains agricultural and timber industry connections, as well as being a service town for local tourist destinations such as the Thomson Dam, the Walhalla Goldfields Railway, Mount Baw Baw and Mount St Gwinear.

The history of the town and surrounding area is the focus of the Erica and District Historical Society, located in the old Rawson Police Station.

At the 2011 census, Erica and the surrounding area had a population of 324. The newer town of Rawson is located a few kilometres away.
