= Darnum =

- Town
- Coordinates: 38°11′0″S 146°01′0″E
- Country: Australia
- State: Victoria
- LGA: Shire of Baw Baw
- Location: 110 km (68 mi) from Melbourne; 10 km (6.2 mi) from Warragul

Government
  - State electorate: Narracan
  - Federal division: Monash

Population
  - Total: 751 (2016 census)
- Postcode: 3822
- County: Buln Buln

Darnum is a town in West Gippsland, Victoria, Australia, located 110 km east of Melbourne and a short distance to Warragul, in the Shire of Baw Baw. It is nestled between the Great Dividing Range and Strzelecki Ranges. The Moe River meanders through the edge of the township which the historic Darnum Butter Factory overlooks.

The origins of the town's name is disputed with Language of the Aborigines of the Colony of Victoria and other Australian Districts cited as its meaning "Parrot". Later sources posit that it could be an exclamation uttered by Sir Thomas Bent.

The post office opened on 1 December 1882 after the arrival of the railway.

Darnum was originally a timber producing town and boasts a large stump in memory of the original timber mill's owner Clarrie Weir. Today the principal industry is dairy farming, with Fonterra, previously Bonlac Foods, operating a milk processing plant just north of town.

Between 1981 and 2017, Darnum was also home to the Darnum Musical Village. A large and important collection of musical instruments, where concerts and events were held. Visitors could play some of the exhibits as tour guides explain the history of different pieces.

The town in conjunction with neighbouring township Nilma has an Australian Rules football team competing in the Ellinbank & District Football League.
