= Neerim =

Neerim Victoria
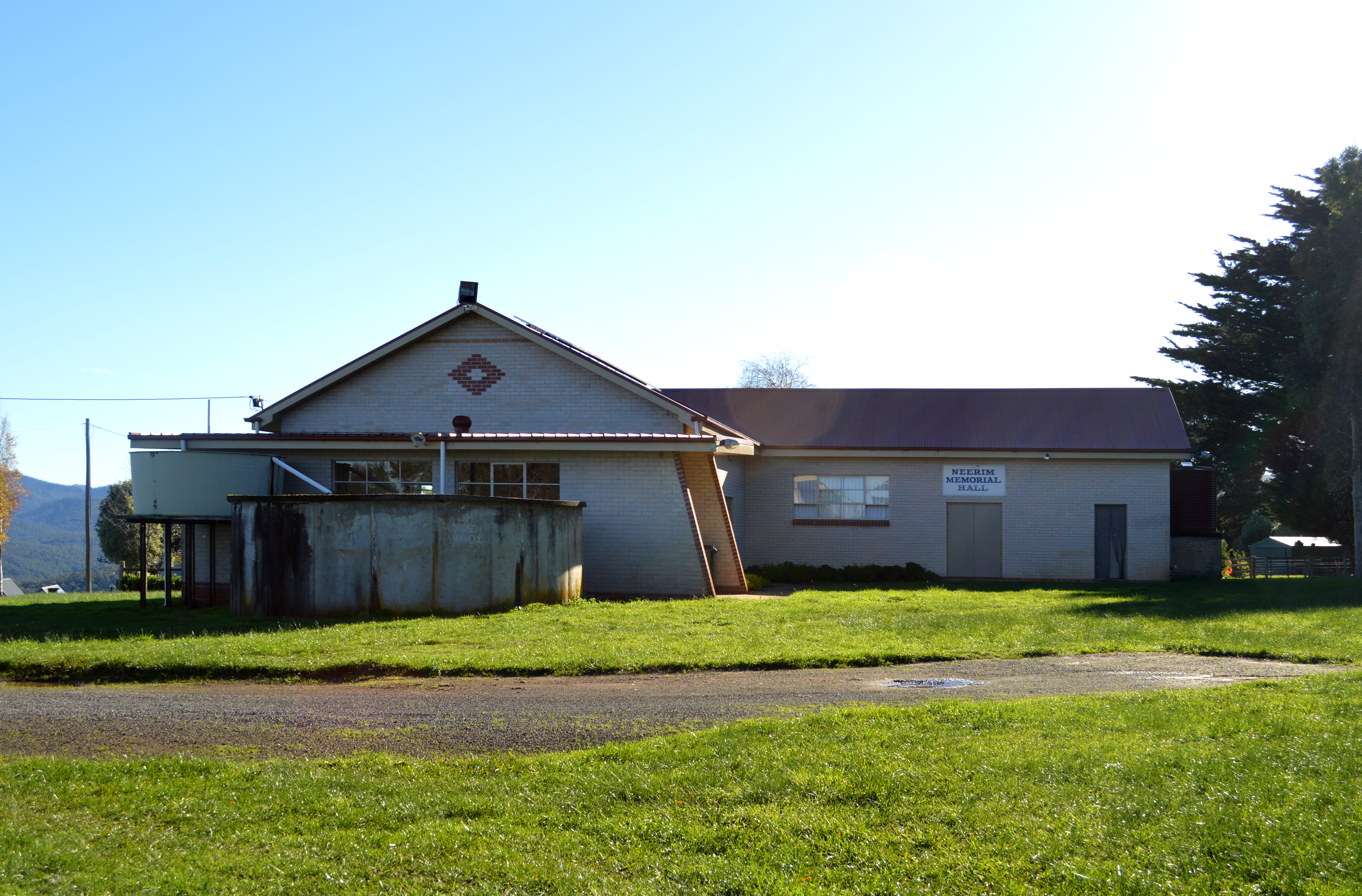
- Memorial Hall

- Coordinates: 37°58′0″S 145°57′0″E
- Population: 218 (SAL 2021)
- Postcode(s): 3831
- Location: 106 km (66 mi) E of Melbourne; 26 km (16 mi) N of Warragul; 27 km (17 mi) NE of Drouin
- LGA(s): Shire of Baw Baw
- County: Buln Buln
- State electorate(s): Narracan
- Federal division(s): Monash

Neerim is a locality in Victoria, Australia, on Main Neerim Road in the Shire of Baw Baw.

The locality was connected to the Victorian Railways network when on 27 March 1917 an extension of the line from Warragul to Neerim South was opened, later connecting to Noojee in 1919. The line closed in 1958.

The Post Office opened on 25 August 1877 and closed in 1967.

The locality, in conjunction with neighbouring township Neerim South, has an Australian Rules football team competing in the Ellinbank & District Football League.
