= Mount St Gwinear =

Mountain in Victoria, Australia

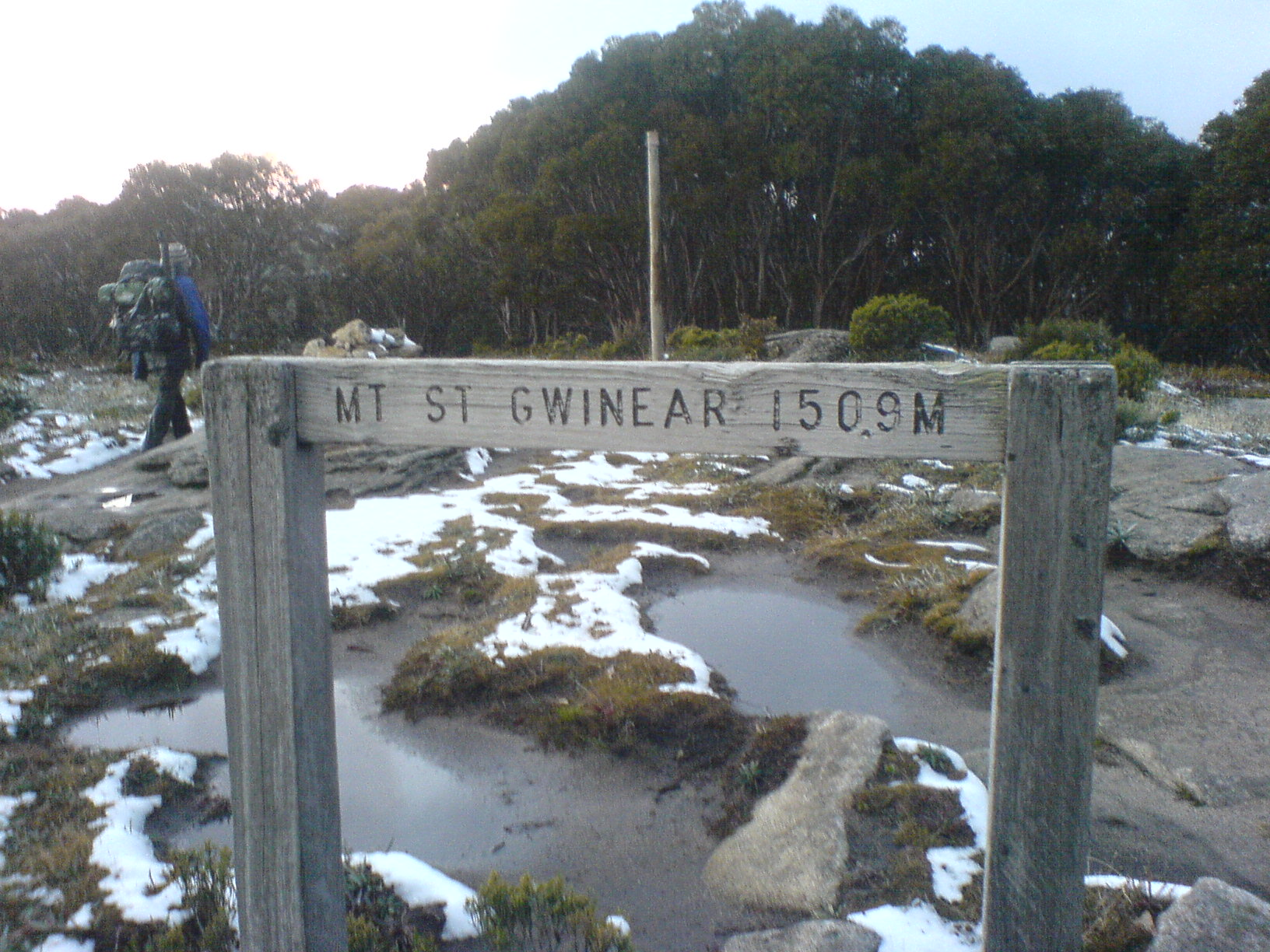
- Mount St Gwinear

Highest point
- Elevation: 1,509 m (4,951 ft)AHD
- Coordinates: 37°50′S 146°19′E

Geography
- Location: Victoria, Australia
- Parent range: Baw Baw Plateau

Climbing
- Easiest route: Hike/ski

Mount St Gwinear is a mountain in Victoria, Australia, located at the north-east end of the Baw Baw National Park in the Gippsland high country. It is popular with families looking for a cheap and accessible snow-play/tobogganing destination and cross-country skiers. The Baw Baw Plateau provides an abundance of easy touring terrain. Mount Baw Baw downhill ski village is approximately nine km away across the Baw Baw plateau to the south-west and trails link the resorts.

Mount St Gwinear was named by the geologist William Baragwanath after Saint Gwinear of Cornwall. He also named the nearby Mt St Phillack.

== See also ==
- Alpine National Park
- List of mountains in Australia § Victoria
- Skiing in Victoria, Australia
