= Ripplebrook =

- Town
- Coordinates: 38°12′S 145°45′E
- Country: Australia
- State: Victoria
- LGA: Shire of Baw Baw
- Location: 98 km (61 mi) SE of Melbourne

Government
  - State electorate: Narracan
  - Federal division: Monash

Population
  - Total: 221 (2016 census)
- Postcode: 3818

Ripplebrook is a locality in the Shire of Baw Baw. As of the 2016 Australian Census, Ripplebrook has a population of 221.

Ripplebrook is mainly farmland used for horse agistment and stud farms. It has a primary school and a Bed & Breakfast Ripplebrook Cottages.
