= Shire of Baw Baw =

Coordinates: 37°57′00″S 146°07′00″E

- Local government area
- Location in Victoria

- Interactive map of Shire of Baw Baw
- Country: Australia
- State: Victoria
- Region: Gippsland
- Established: 1994
- Council seat: Warragul

Government
  - Mayor: Cr Annemarie McCabe
  - State electorate: Narracan
  - Federal division: *Monash; Gippsland

Area
  - Total: 4,028 km^{2} (1,555 sq mi)

Population
  - Total: 57,626 (2021)
  - Density: 14.3064/km^{2} (37.053/sq mi)
- Gazetted: 2 December 1994
- Website: Shire of Baw Baw
LGAs around Shire of Baw Baw
Yarra Ranges	Mansfield	Wellington
Cardinia	Shire of Baw Baw	Latrobe
South Gippsland	South Gippsland	Latrobe

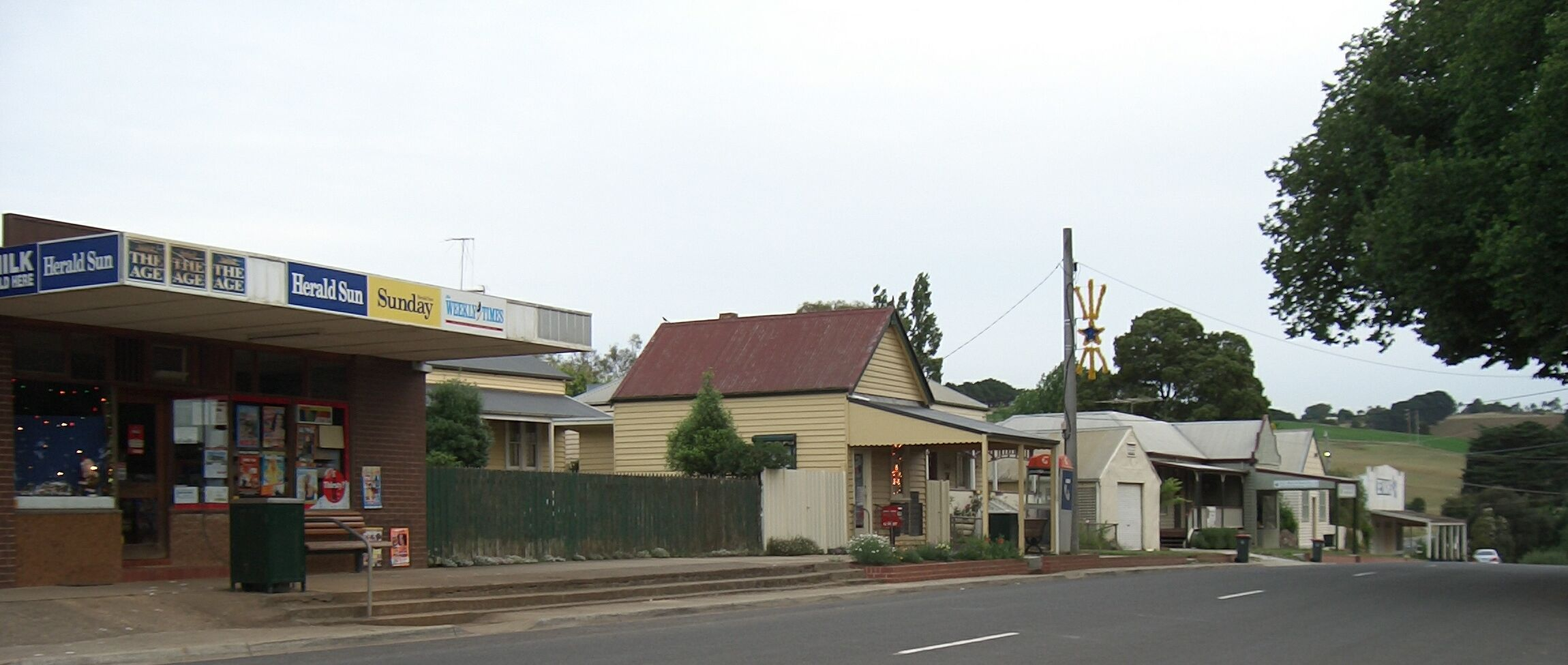
Thorpdale, one of the towns administered by the Shire of Baw Baw

The Shire of Baw Baw (/ˈbɔː ˈbɔː/) is a local government area in Victoria, Australia, in the eastern part of the state. It covers an area of 4,028 square kilometres (1,555 mi^{2}) and in 2021 had a population of 57,626. It includes the towns of Drouin, Longwarry, Neerim South, Trafalgar, Warragul and Yarragon.

The shire is governed and administered by the Baw Baw Shire Council; its seat of local government and administrative centre is located at the council headquarters in Drouin, and it has a service centre located in Warragul. The shire is named after the major geographical feature in the region, the Baw Baw Plateau; Mount Baw Baw is the second highest peak in the region. An unincorporated area, the Mount Baw Baw Alpine Resort, is enclaved within the shire.

== History ==
The Shire was formed in 1994 from the amalgamation of the Shire of Buln Buln, Shire of Narracan, Rural City of Warragul, and the part of the Shire of Upper Yarra that lay in the Thomson River catchment.

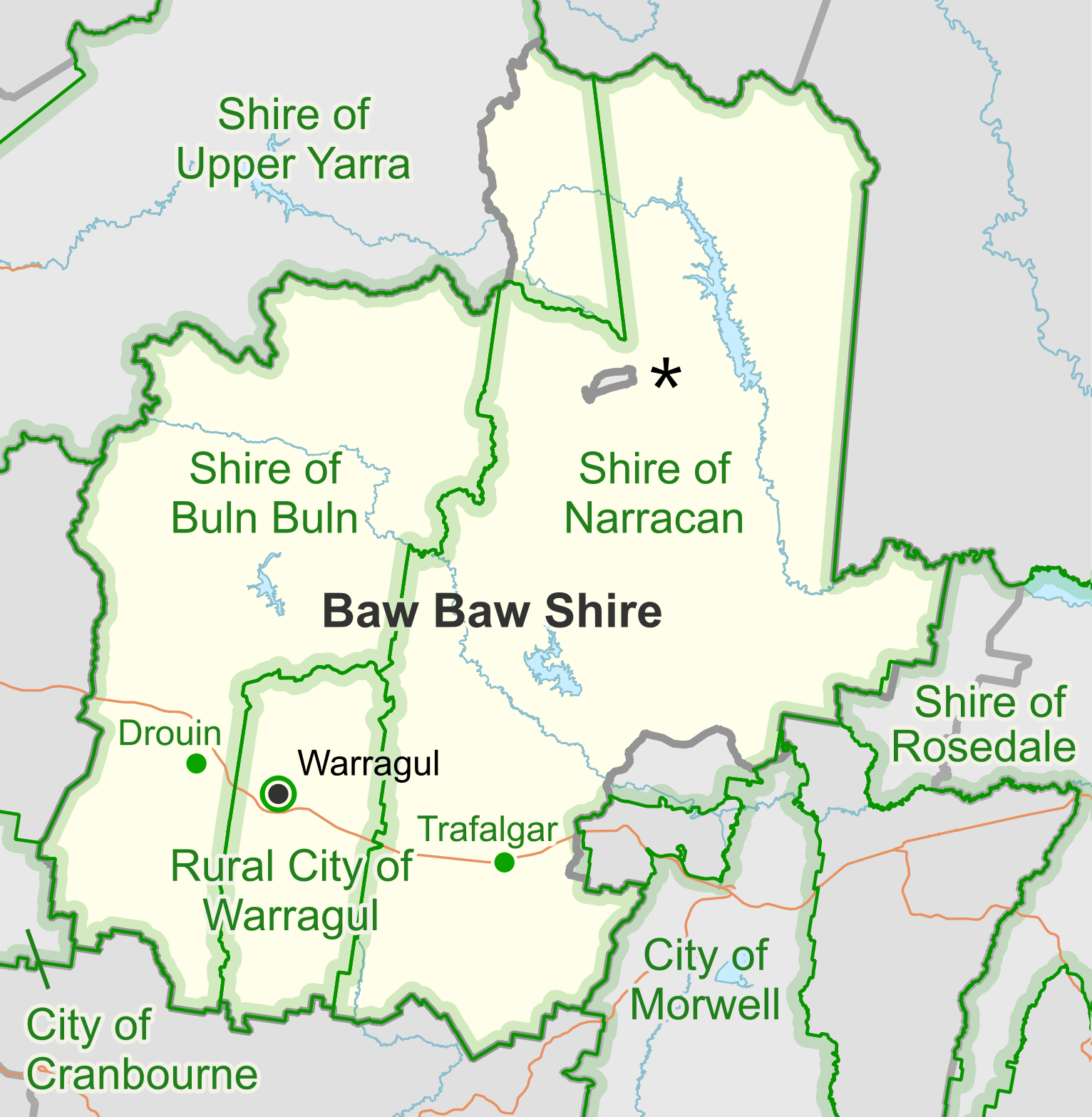
Baw Baw Shire's predecessor LGAs (green) as they were in 1994. The administrative centres of the former LGAs are marked by green dots. 🞲 The Mount Baw Baw Alpine Resort was excised in 1997

== Location and geography ==
The more densely populated southern half of the shire consists of low rolling hills given over primarily to dairy farming and other agriculture. The northern half lies in the Great Dividing Range and its foothills, where forestry remains an important industry. Tourism is also important in the region, aided by its proximity to and easy access from Melbourne. The shire is known for its rural scenery and natural environment, as well as gourmet foods and wines. The historic gold-mining town of Walhalla, located in the northeast of the shire, is a major tourist drawcard. The major electricity-producing region of the Latrobe Valley lies immediately to the shire's east and south.

Many of the shire's larger towns are located along the Princes Highway and Gippsland railway line, which cross the southern part of the shire. From west to east these include: Longwarry, Drouin, Warragul, Darnum, Yarragon, and Trafalgar. North of Warragul are Buln Buln, Neerim South, and Noojee, while south of Trafalgar in the Strzelecki Ranges lies the town of Thorpdale. The towns of Rawson, Erica, and Parkers Corner are located near Walhalla amongst the foothills of the Baw Baw Plateau. Aberfeldy is located in the far north east of the shire above the Thomson Dam, which supplies 50% of Melbourne's water.

== Council ==
=== Composition up to November 2016 ===
The council was composed of four wards and nine councillors, with three councillors elected to represent the Warragul Ward and two councillors per remaining ward elected to represent each of the other wards.

Ward	Party	Councillor	Notes
Drouin	Independent	Tricia Jones	
Drouin	Independent	Terry Williamson	
Mount Worth	Independent	Murray Cook	Mayor 2012/2013 and 2013/2014
Mount Worth	Independent	Peter Kostos	
North	Independent	David Balfour	
North	Independent	Deborah Brown	Mayor 2014/2015
Warragul	Independent	Joe Gauci	Mayor 2015/2016
Warragul	Independent	Gerard Murphy	
Warragul	Independent	Mikaela Power	

=== Composition November 2016 to November 2020 ===
The council was changed to a three-ward structure with three councillors per ward, with the new council sworn in on 2 November 2016. The new wards are West [660sq km] (primarily Drouin with some rural areas north/south), Central [66sq km] (Warragul town) and East [3,302sq km] making up the balance of the shire.

Ward	Party	Councillor	Notes
West	Independent	Tricia Jones	
West	Independent	Keith Cook	
West	Independent	Jessica O'Donnell	
East	Independent	Michael Leaney	
East	Independent	Peter Kostos	
East	Independent	Darren Wallace	
Central	Independent	Danny Goss	Mayor 2019/2020
Central	Independent	Mikaela Power	Mayor 2018/19
Central	Independent	Joe Gauci	Mayor 2016/2017 and 2017/18

=== Current composition ===
The council's three-ward structure continued with three councillors per ward, with the new council sworn in from November 2024. The wards are West [660sq km] (primarily Drouin with some rural areas north/south), Central [66sq km] (based on Warragul) and East [3,302sq km] making up the balance of the shire.

Ward	Party	Councillor	Notes
Central	Independent	Danny Goss	
Central	Independent	Paul Pratt	
Central	Independent	Suzanne Allen	Deputy Mayor
East	Independent	Adam Sheehan	
East	Independent	Brendan Kingwill	
East	Independent	Kate Wilson	Mayor
West	Independent One Nation	Ben Lucas	
West	Independent	Tricia Jones	
West	Independent	Jess Hamilton	

=== Administration and governance ===
The council meets monthly in the Fountain Room of the West Gippsland Arts Centre. The council's administrative activities are centred in Drouin in the former offices of the Buln Buln Shire. It also provides customer services at both Warragul and the council offices in Drouin. Service centres in Trafalgar and on Smith Street in Warragul were closed in 2015.

== Townships and localities ==
In the 2021 census, the shire's population was 57,626, up from 48,479 in the 2016 census.

Population
Locality	2016	2021
Aberfeldy	0	7
Ada	0	0
Allambee	19	24
Allambee Reserve^	95	96
Allambee South	76	61
Amor	0	4
Athlone	122	147
Baw Baw	0	0
Bona Vista	109	107
Boola	0	0
Brandy Creek	100	94
Bravington	17	14
Buln Buln	548	551
Buln Buln East	164	182
Caringal	19	16
Childers	106	91
Cloverlea	192	178
Coalville	49	55
Coopers Creek	*	#
Crossover	158	161
Darnum	751	759
Delburn^	32	37
Drouin	12,349	15,287
Drouin East	182	177
Drouin South	335	343
Drouin West	330	361
Ellinbank	236	229
Erica	191	184
Ferndale	37	48
Fumina	11	11
Fumina South	67	65
Gainsborough	45	61
Gentle Annie	0	0
Hallora	126	136
Heath Hill^	161	189
Hill End	166	171
Icy Creek	11	28
Jacob Creek	23	28
Jericho	0	0
Jindivick	491	584
Labertouche	356	386
Lardner	117	110
Lillico	86	94
Loch Valley	0	0
Longwarry^	2,004	2,436
Longwarry North	215	230
Modella^	148	169
Moe^	8,778	9,375
Moe South^	541	529
Moondarra	46	49
Mountain View	90	85
Narracan^	253	262
Nayook	75	70
Neerim	200	218
Neerim East	192	196
Neerim Junction	127	139
Neerim North	42	41
Neerim South	1,305	1,599
Nilma	342	410
Nilma North	319	344
Noojee	157	177
Nyora^	1,527	1,644
Piedmont	46	52
Poowong East^	82	88
Poowong North^	186	202
Rawson	296	296
Ripplebrook	221	268
Rokeby	180	213
Seaview	125	140
Shady Creek	180	186
Strzelecki^	89	107
Tanjil	0	0
Tanjil Bren	14	7
Tanjil South^	544	540
Tetoora Road	66	93
Thalloo	*	#
Thomson	0	0
Thorpdale	471	475
Thorpdale South^	30	27
Toombon	0	0
Toongabbie^	989	1,085
Toorongo^	0	0
Torwood	50	49
Trafalgar	3,912	4,349
Trafalgar East	426	401
Trafalgar South	276	305
Trida^	62	87
Vesper	42	50
Walhalla^	20	35
Warragul	15,757	19,856
Warragul South	253	280
Warragul West	19	33
Westbury	157	163
Willow Grove	590	654
Yallourn North^	1,545	1,511
Yarragon	1,650	1,893
Yarragon South	164	204

^ - Territory divided with another LGA
* - Not noted in 2016 Census
# - Not noted in 2021 Census

== See also ==
- List of localities (Victoria)
- List of reduplicated Australian place names
- Local government in Australia
