= Mount Baw Baw Alpine Resort =

Ski resort in Victoria, Australia

Mt. Baw Baw Alpine Resort
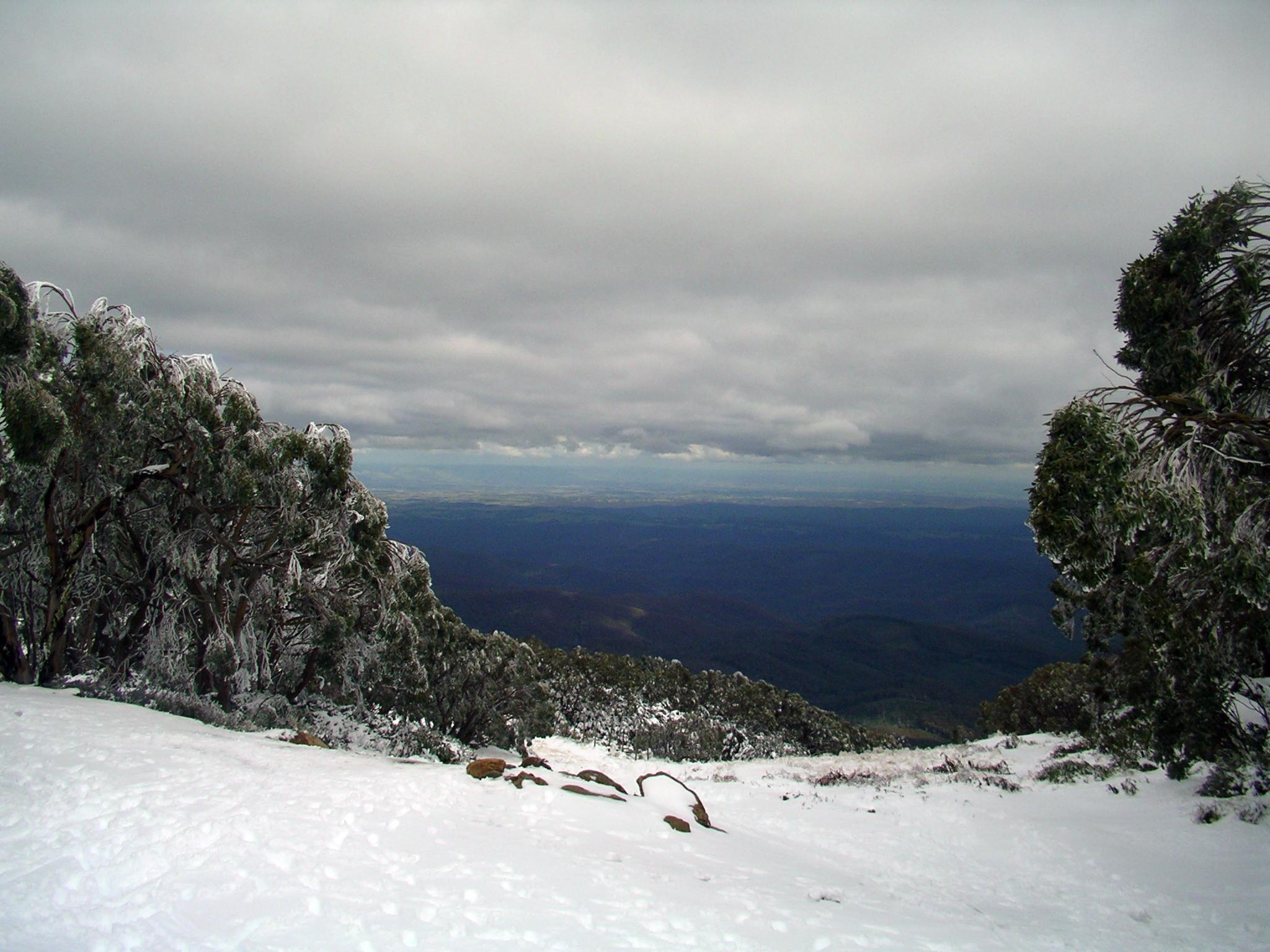
- View from the summit of Mt. Baw Baw
- Interactive map of Mt. Baw Baw Alpine Resort
- Location: Mount Baw Baw
- Nearest city: Melbourne
- Vertical: 107 metres (351 ft) AHD
- Top elevation: 1,567 metres (5,141 ft) AHD
- Base elevation: 1,460 metres (4,790 ft) AHD
- Skiable area: 35 hectares (86 acres)
- Trails: 15+
- Longest run: 750 metres (2,460 ft)
- Lift system: 7 lifts
- Terrain parks: 3 (snow dependent)
- Website: www.mountbawbaw.com.au

Mt. Baw Baw Alpine Resort is an Australian downhill ski resort located approximately 120 kilometres (75 mi) east of Melbourne and 50 kilometres (31 mi) north of the Latrobe Valley in Victoria. The Alpine Resort is an unincorporated area which is surrounded by the Baw Baw National Park and the Australian Alps Walking Track passes nearby. The summit of Mount Baw Baw (1567m) falls within the boundaries of the resort and is accessible by lift or walking trail. The resort is also a base for cross-country skiing on the Baw-Baw Plateau.

The resort is the closest downhill ski resort to Melbourne and takes 2.5 hours to reach. Road access to the resort is via the Mount Baw Baw Tourist Road (from the west) or the unsealed South Face Road (from the east).

In 2018, Mt. Baw Baw became the second ski resort in Australia to operate a TechnoAlpin Snow Factory capable of producing snow in any outdoor temperature.

== Ski runs ==
The Mt Baw Baw alpine resort has 7 surface lifts which provide access to its 15 ski runs and toboggan areas: Maltese Cross T-Bar, Summit T-Bar, Big Hill Poma, Painted Run T-Bar, Tank Hill Platter, Hut Run Platter and the Magic Carpet. The resort categorises 25% of runs as beginner, 64% intermediate and 11% advanced. Mt Baw Baw is considered an ideal resort for novice downhill skiers and boarders and for families. The resort also provides access to over 10 km of groomed cross country ski trails.

== Climate ==
Mount Baw Baw has a Subpolar oceanic climate (Cfc). The mountain summit receives more annual precipitation than most places in mainland Australia, with frequent and heavy snow between May and October but can occur at any time of the year (as well as a persistent snowpack). Frequent, heavy cloud cover and strong winds mean that minimum temperatures rarely drop below −5 °C (23 °F), whereas maximum temperatures are frequently at or below 0 °C (32 °F); the mountain is often shrouded in low cloud or mist in winter, reducing diurnal range. The mean afternoon humidity of 80%, is extreme (especially for a mainland Australian region).

Summers are cool with temperatures rarely rising above 25 °C (77 °F); summers can also be very cold, with a maximum temperature of just −0.4 °C (31.3 °F) recorded on 25 December 2006, and 1.0 °C (33.8 °F) on both 11 January 2012 and 16 February 1998. During the 2009 Victorian heatwave most of the state saw highs of above 45 °C (113 °F), while the temperature on Mount Baw Baw's summit reached a comparatively cool maximum of just 31.3 °C (88.3 °F).

Climate data for Mount Baw Baw (1997–2025); 1,561 m AMSL; 37.84° S, 146.27° E
Month	Jan	Feb	Mar	Apr	May	Jun	Jul	Aug	Sep	Oct	Nov	Dec	Year
Record high °C (°F)	30.9 (87.6)	31.3 (88.3)	26.2 (79.2)	20.6 (69.1)	16.2 (61.2)	12.6 (54.7)	10.0 (50.0)	13.1 (55.6)	16.7 (62.1)	21.2 (70.2)	26.0 (78.8)	27.7 (81.9)	31.3 (88.3)
Mean daily maximum °C (°F)	17.5 (63.5)	16.5 (61.7)	14.1 (57.4)	10.0 (50.0)	6.4 (43.5)	3.4 (38.1)	2.3 (36.1)	3.1 (37.6)	5.8 (42.4)	8.9 (48.0)	12.1 (53.8)	14.5 (58.1)	9.5 (49.2)
Mean daily minimum °C (°F)	8.8 (47.8)	8.1 (46.6)	6.5 (43.7)	4.0 (39.2)	1.5 (34.7)	−0.6 (30.9)	−1.5 (29.3)	−1.4 (29.5)	−0.1 (31.8)	1.7 (35.1)	4.1 (39.4)	5.9 (42.6)	3.1 (37.6)
Record low °C (°F)	−2.0 (28.4)	−1.4 (29.5)	−2.2 (28.0)	−5.7 (21.7)	−5.8 (21.6)	−7.0 (19.4)	−6.6 (20.1)	−8.5 (16.7)	−6.3 (20.7)	−6.4 (20.5)	−4.5 (23.9)	−3.1 (26.4)	−8.5 (16.7)
Average precipitation mm (inches)	97.6 (3.84)	92.7 (3.65)	109.0 (4.29)	142.5 (5.61)	123.8 (4.87)	156.0 (6.14)	175.0 (6.89)	172.3 (6.78)	162.1 (6.38)	158.5 (6.24)	167.5 (6.59)	137.5 (5.41)	1,677.7 (66.05)
Average precipitation days (≥ 0.2 mm)	12.4	11.6	13.5	15.0	15.0	16.3	19.6	19.3	16.4	16.8	16.1	14.8	186.8
Average afternoon relative humidity (%)	71	73	75	81	83	88	89	87	85	82	77	73	80
Source: Australian Government Bureau of Meteorology

== Ownership and operation ==
The resort is operated by Alpine Resorts Victoria who are responsible for management of all 6 Victorian ski resorts.

== See also ==
- Skiing in Australia
- Mount Baw Baw
- Australian Alps Walking Track
- Lake Mountain (Victoria)
- Baw baw frog, A critically endangered frog, which lives on the Baw Baw Plateau.
