= County of Buln Buln =

Coordinates: 38°30′S 146°50′E

Buln Buln
- Cadastral division
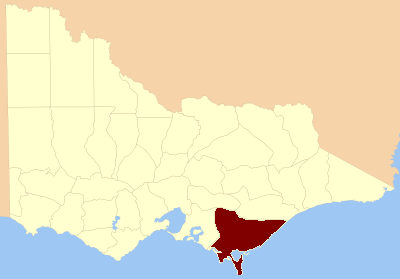
- Location in Victoria
- Country: Australia
- State: Victoria
- Established: 24 February 1871

Area
  - Total: 9,684 km^{2} (3,739 sq mi)
Lands administrative divisions around Buln Buln
Evelyn	Tanjil	Tanjil
Mornington	Buln Buln	Tasman Sea
Bass Strait	Bass Strait	Bass Strait

The County of Buln Buln is one of the 37 counties of Victoria which are part of the cadastral divisions of Australia, used for land titles. It was first proclaimed in government gazette on 24 Feb 1871 together with others from the Gipps Land District. It includes Wilsons Promontory, and the Victorian coast from around Venus Bay in the west to Lake Wellington in the east. Sale is near its north-eastern edge. Some time earlier maps showed proposed counties of Bass, Douro, and part of Haddington and Bruce occupying the area of Buln Buln.

== Parishes ==
Parishes include:

- Alberton East, Victoria
- Alberton West, Victoria
- Allambee, Victoria
- Allambee East, Victoria
- Balloong, Victoria
- Beek Beek, Victoria
- Binginwarri, Victoria
- Boodyarn, Victoria
- Booran, Victoria
- Bruthen, Victoria
- Budgeree, Victoria
- Bulga, Victoria
- Callignee, Victoria
- Carrajung, Victoria
- Coolungoolun, Victoria
- Churchill, Victoria
- Darnum, Victoria
- Darriman, Victoria
- Devon, Victoria
- Doomburrim, Victoria
- Drouin East, Victoria
- Drouin West, Victoria
- Drumdlemara, Victoria
- Dulungalong, Victoria
- Dumbalk, Victoria
- Ellinging, Victoria
- Fumina, Victoria
- Giffard, Victoria
- Glencoe, Victoria
- Glencoe South, Victoria
- Gunyah Gunyah, Victoria
- Hazelwood, Victoria
- Holey Plains, Victoria
- Jeeralang, Victoria
- Jindivick, Victoria
- Jumbuk, Victoria
- Kirrak, Victoria
- Koorooman, Victoria
- Korumburra, Victoria
- Kulk, Victoria
- Leongatha, Victoria
- Longford, Victoria
- Longwarry, Victoria
- Loy Yang, Victoria
- Mardan, Victoria
- Maryvale, Victoria
- Meeniyan, Victoria
- Mirboo, Victoria
- Mirboo North, Victoria
- Moe, Victoria
- Morwell, Victoria
- Mullungdung, Victoria
- Narracan, Victoria
- Narracan South, Victoria
- Nayook, Victoria
- Nayook West, Victoria
- Neerim, Victoria
- Neerim East, Victoria
- Nerrena, Victoria
- Noojee, Victoria
- Noojee East, Victoria
- Poowong, Victoria
- Poowong East, Victoria
- Rosedale, Victoria
- Seacombe, Victoria
- Snake Island (Victoria)
- St Margaret, Victoria
- Stradbroke, Victoria
- Sunday Island (Victoria)
- Tallang, Victoria
- Tarra Tarra, Victoria
- Tarwin, Victoria
- Tarwin South, Victoria
- Tong Bong, Victoria
- Toora, Victoria
- Toorongo, Victoria
- Traralgon, Victoria
- Waratah, Victoria
- Waratah North, Victoria
- Warragul, Victoria
- Warren, Victoria
- Welshpool, Victoria
- Willung, Victoria
- Wonga Wonga, Victoria
- Wonga Wonga South, Victoria
- Wonwron, Victoria
- Wonyip, Victoria
- Woodside, Victoria
- Woorarra, Victoria
- Woranga, Victoria
- Wull Wullock, Victoria
- Yanakie, Victoria
- Yanakie South, Victoria
- Yarragon, Victoria
- Yarram, Victoria
- Yinnar, Victoria

== See also ==
- List of reduplicated Australian place names
