= Neerim South =

Neerim South Victoria
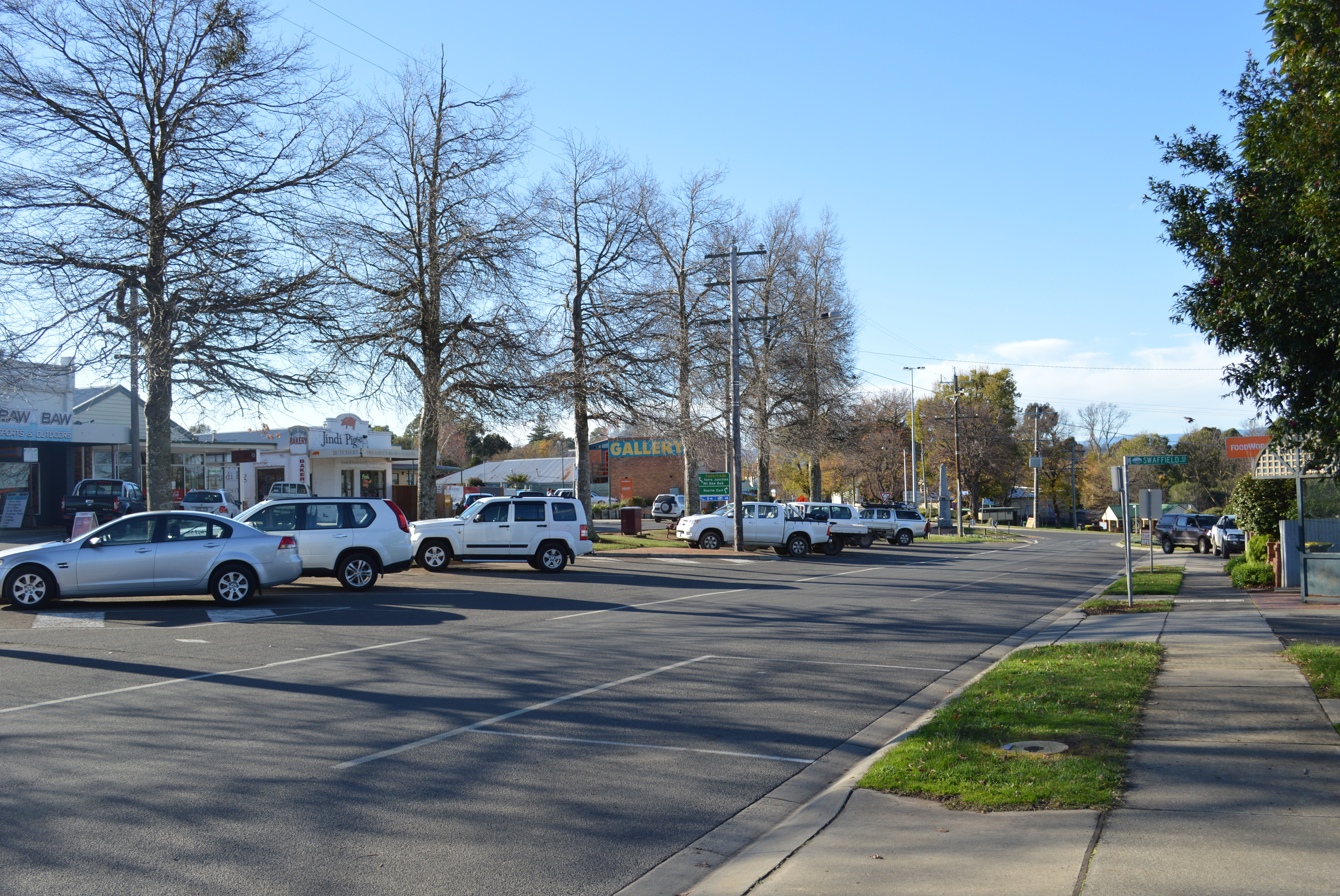
- Main street

- Coordinates: 38°01′0″S 145°58′0″E
- Population: 1,599 (2021 census)
  - Density: 24.98/km^{2} (64.7/sq mi)
- Postcode(s): 3831
- Elevation: 238 m (781 ft)
- Area: 64 km^{2} (24.7 sq mi)
- Location: 110 km (68 mi) E of Melbourne; 20 km (12 mi) N of Warragul
- LGA(s): Shire of Baw Baw
- State electorate(s): Narracan
- Federal division(s): Monash

Neerim South is a town in West Gippsland, Victoria, Australia, located in the Shire of Baw Baw, 110 kilometres (68 mi) east of Melbourne and 20 kilometres (12 mi) north of Warragul. At the 2021 census, Neerim South had a population of 1,599.

The Post Office opened on 1 February 1883.

The town was connected to the Victorian Railways network with the opening of a branch line from the main Gippsland line at Warragul on 18 March 1892, later connecting to Noojee in 1919. The line closed in 1958.

The Neerim South Court of Petty Sessions closed in 1968.

Elementary education is provided by Neerim South Primary School. Secondary education is provided at Neerim District Secondary College

The town's main industry is service to the local farming community. It contains art galleries, a working Alpaca farm with an Alpaca product shop, cafés, restaurants, a pub and bed and breakfasts. Until 2008, the bakery still cooked bread in the wood-fired oven built in 1880. The area has numerous wineries, and is known for its blue cheese.

The town in conjunction with neighbouring township Neerim has an Australian Rules football and netball team (Neerim Neerim South Cats) competing in the Ellinbank & District Football League.
