= West Gippsland =

Region of Gippsland in Victoria, Australia

West Gippsland is a region of Gippsland in Victoria, Australia. It covers an area of 19,639 km^{2} (7,583 sq mi) around the eastern shores of the Western Port Bay, extending from San Remo in the west to the Strzelecki Ranges in the east, up to Mount Howitt in the north.

The Shire of Cardinia and Phillip Island both are parts of West Gippsland geographically, although administratively those are assigned to the Greater Melbourne metropolitan area (due to urban sprawl) and South Gippsland, respectively.

== Geography ==
The western part of the region around Western Port Bay and the Bunyip River is mostly flat (much of it having been reclaimed from the drained Koo-Wee-Rup Swamp), while the eastern part consists of low rolling hills.

To the north these hills become steeper as they merge into the Great Dividing Range. In the mountainous north around Noojee logging remains an important industry, while a small winter resort is located to the northeast at Mount Baw Baw. Further to the east are the small township of Erica and the historic gold mining town of Walhalla.

Nature reserves in the region include Bunyip State Park, Mount Worth State Park and Baw Baw National Park. Principal towns of West Gippsland include (from west to east along the Princes Highway) Drouin, Warragul and Trafalgar.
