= Stratford railway station, Victoria =

Railway station in Victoria, Australia

Stratford
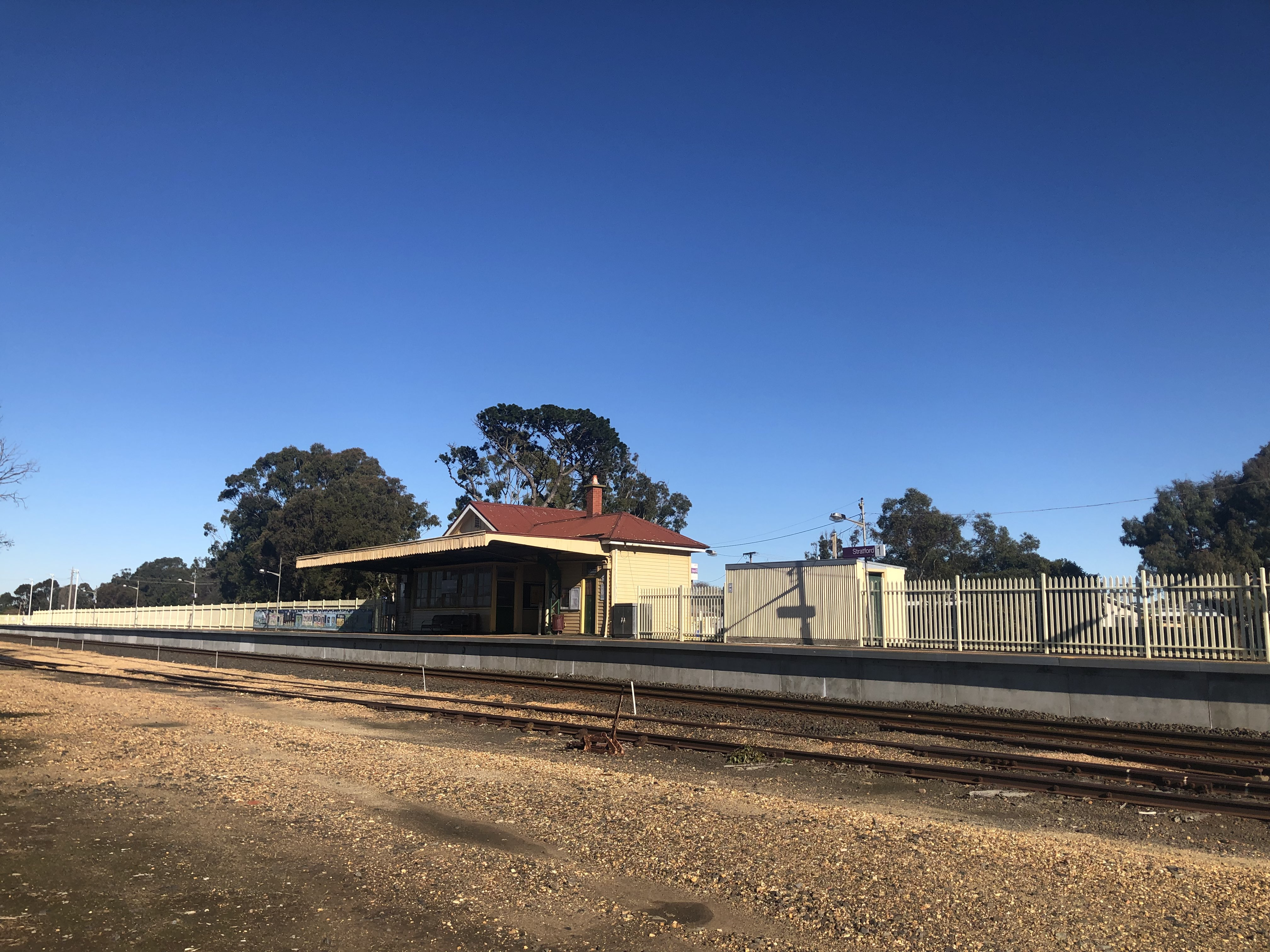
- Westbound view of the station building and platform, June 2021

General information
- Location: Dixon Street, Stratford, Victoria 3862; Shire of Wellington; Australia
- Coordinates: 37°58′02″S 147°04′53″E
- System: PTV regional rail station
- Owner: VicTrack
- Operator: V/Line
- Line: Gippsland
- Distance: 222.11 kilometres from Southern Cross
- Platforms: 1
- Tracks: 4

Construction
- Structure type: At-grade
- Parking: Yes
- Accessible: Yes

Other information
- Status: Operational, unstaffed
- Station code: SFD
- Fare zone: Myki zone 18
- Website: Public Transport Victoria

History
- Opened: 8 November 1887; 138 years ago
- Closed: August 1993
- Rebuilt: 3 May 2004

Services
Preceding station	V/Line	Following station
Sale towards Southern Cross	Gippsland line	Bairnsdale Terminus

Former service
Preceding station	Disused railways	Following station
Sale	Orbost line	Munro
Powerscourt	Maffra line	Terminus
List of closed railway stations in Victoria
Location
- Location within Victoria

Stratford railway station is a regional railway station on the Gippsland line, part of the Victorian railway network. It serves the town of Stratford, in Victoria, Australia, and opened on 8 November 1887. It was closed in August 1993 and reopened on 3 May 2004.

== History ==
When Stratford opened, it was a temporary terminus of the line from Stratford Junction, a few kilometres to the west. On 8 May 1888, the line was extended to Bairnsdale.

In 1985 a spur siding was provided from Stratford, to provide access to a works depot where teams of workers would live during a rebuild project covering the Gippsland line.

Major signalling changes occurred at the station in 1986, including the abolition of the electric staff sections Sale - Stratford Junction and Stratford Junction - Stratford, which were replaced by the electric staff section Sale - Stratford, with an intermediate electric staff instrument provided at Stratford Junction. All signals and interlocking at Stratford Junction were abolished at that time.

Under the Kennett government, V/Line passenger services to Stratford were suspended in August 1993, when the line to Bairnsdale was closed. The passenger service was restored by the Backs government on 3 May 2004. The platform was lengthened by 39 metres in 2024.

As part of the Regional Rail Revival project to upgrade the Gippsland line, a new railway bridge was built over the Avon River, south of the station. It replaced the bridge which dated from 1888, on which train speeds had been restricted to 10 km/h for safety reasons. The new bridge was opened in December 2020.

Until their closure, Munro, Fernbank, Lindenow and Hillside stations were located between Stratford and Bairnsdale stations.

== Platforms and services ==
Stratford has one platform and is served by V/Line Bairnsdale line trains.

Stratford platform arrangement
Platform	Line	Destination
1	Bairnsdale line	Southern Cross, Bairnsdale

== Gallery ==
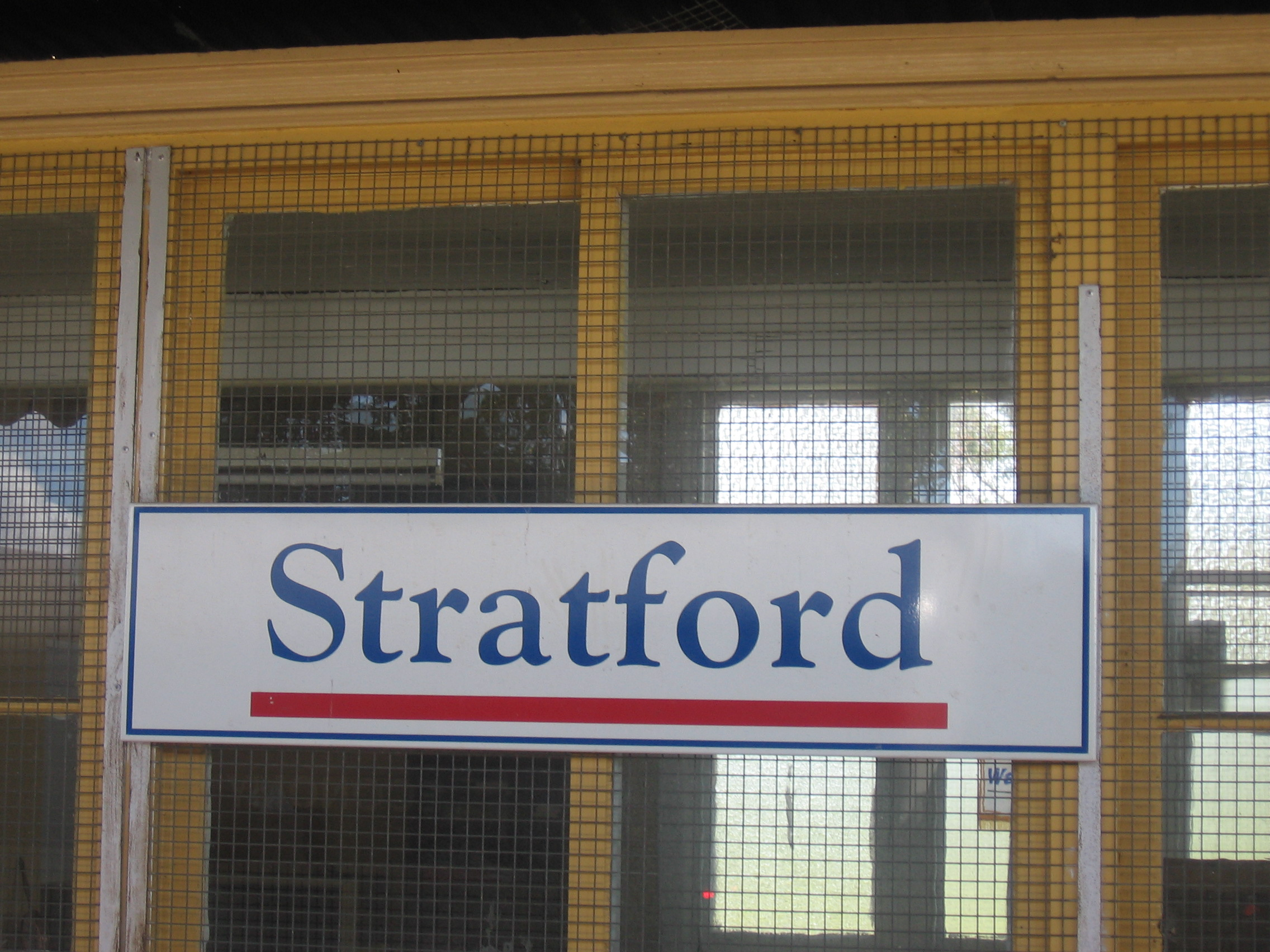
Former V/Line platform signage, September 2008

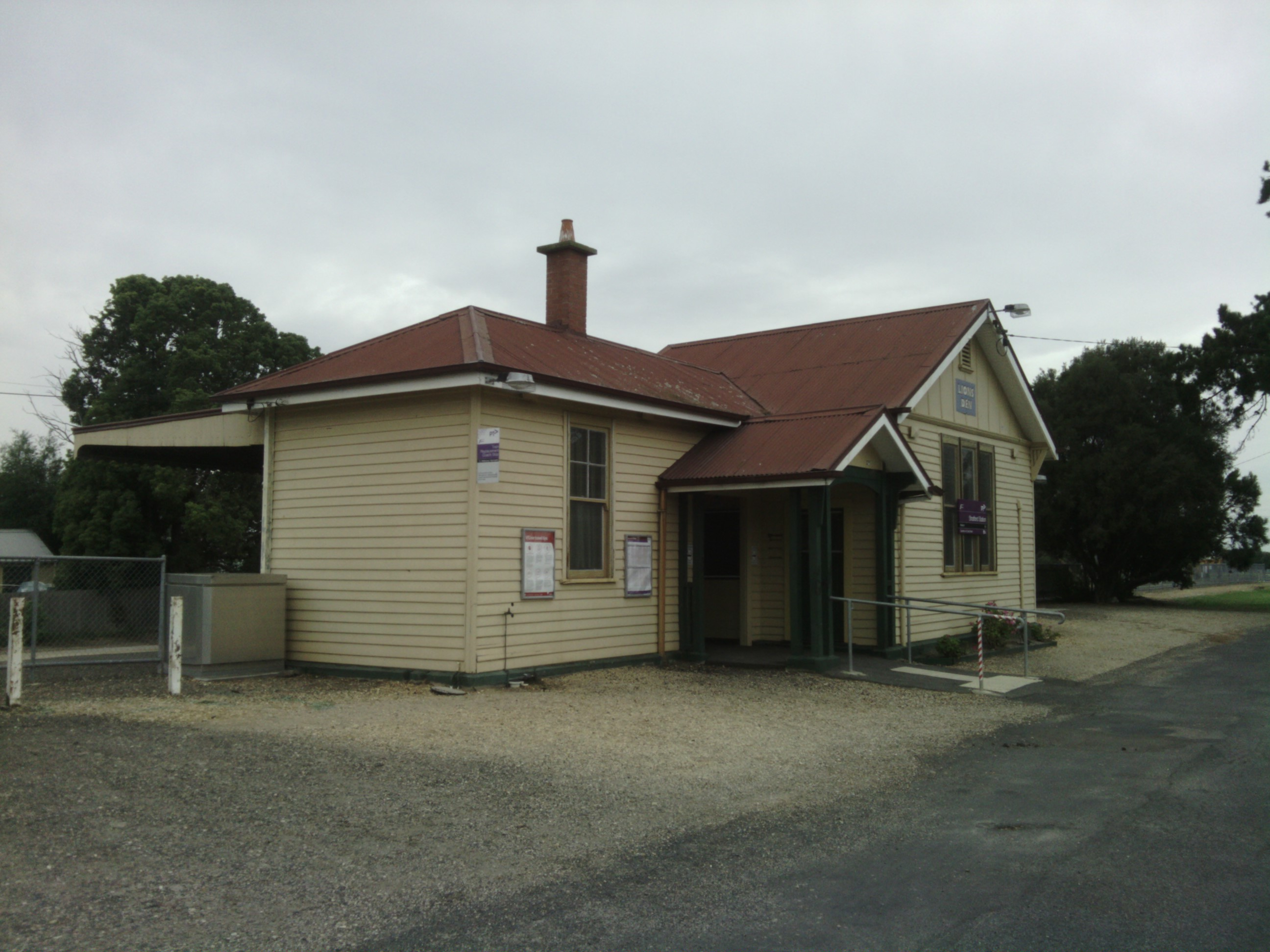
Station building and entrance, February 2015

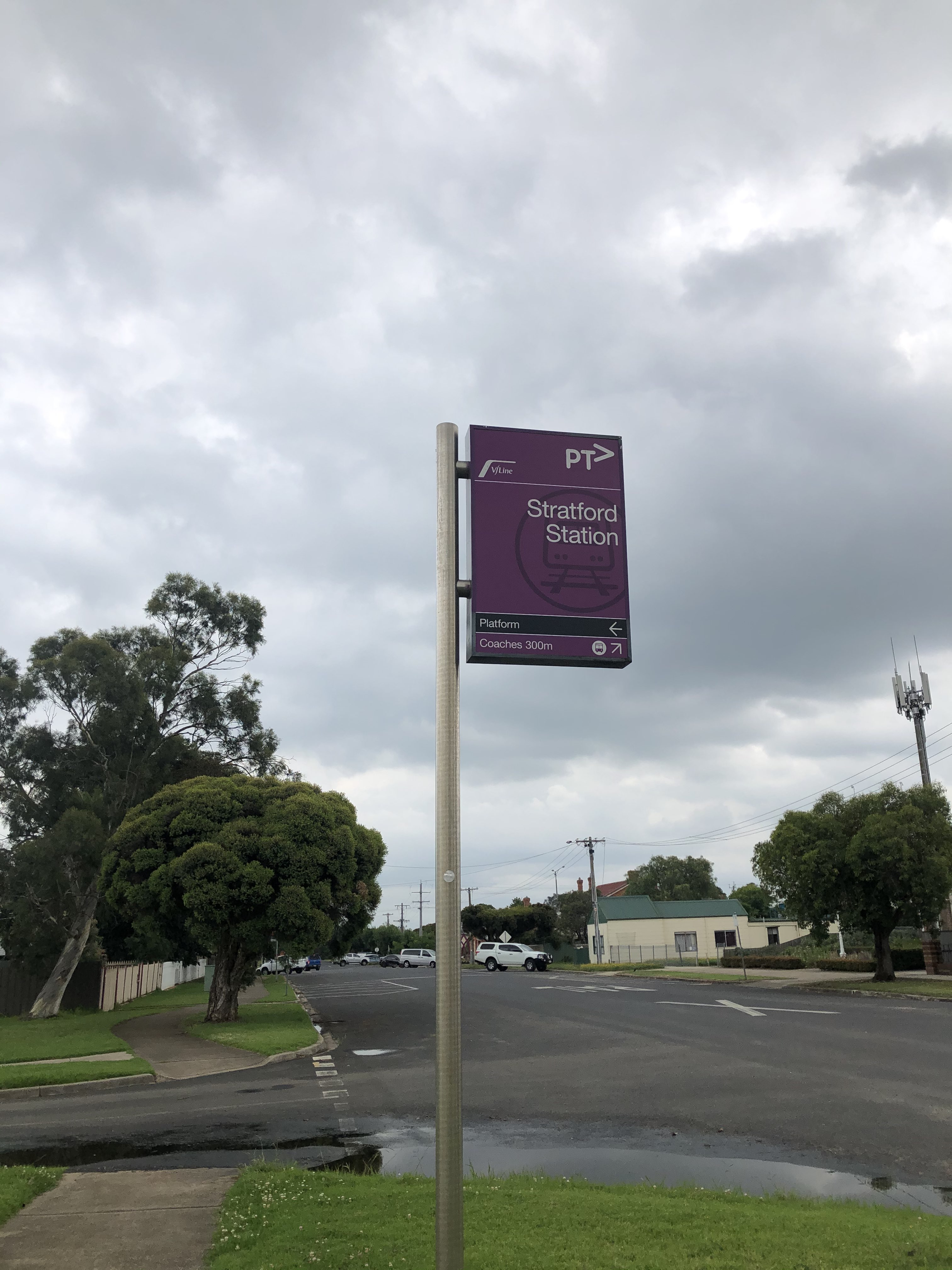
Station entrance signage, January 2021

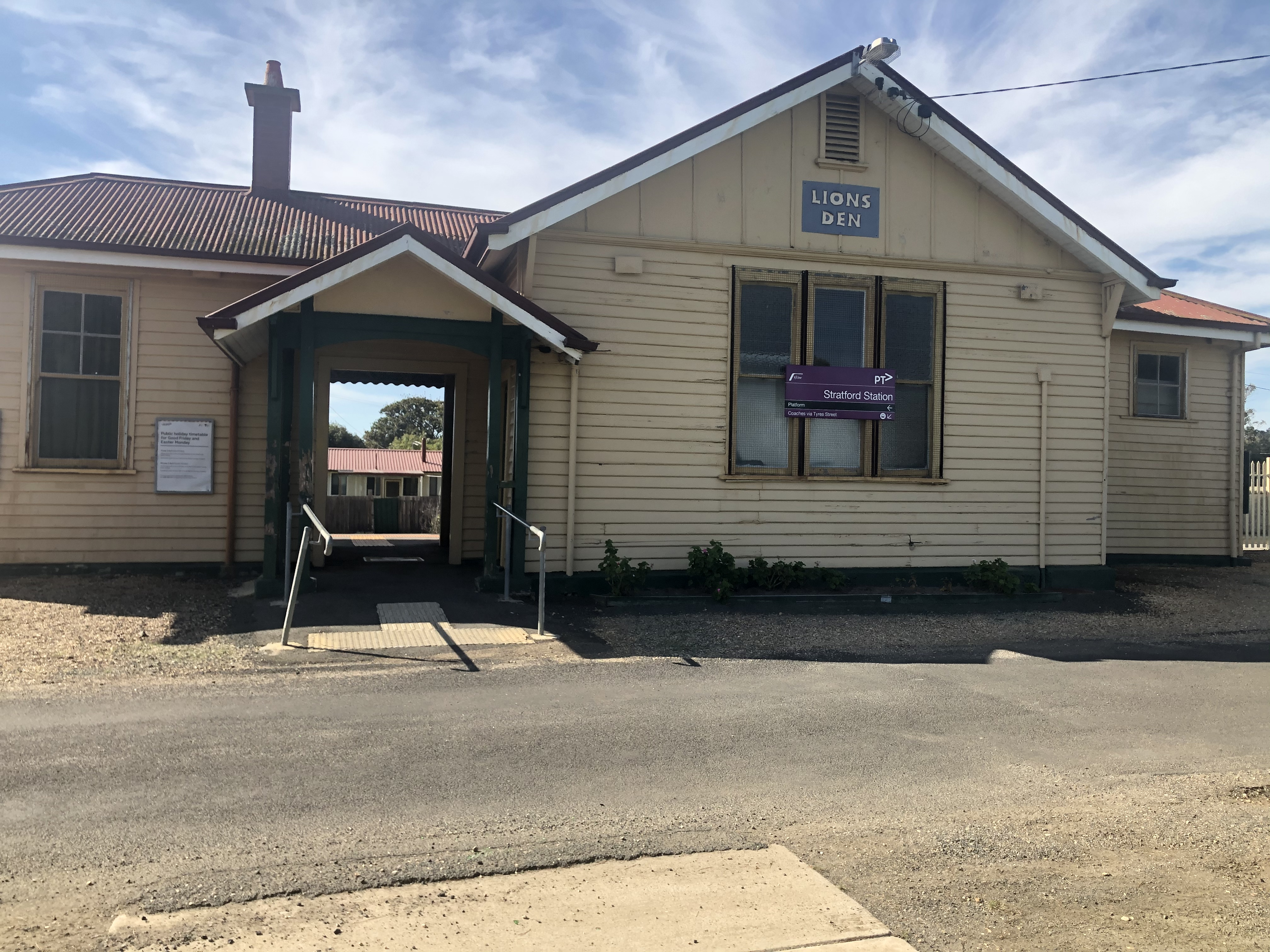
Station building and entrance, April 2021

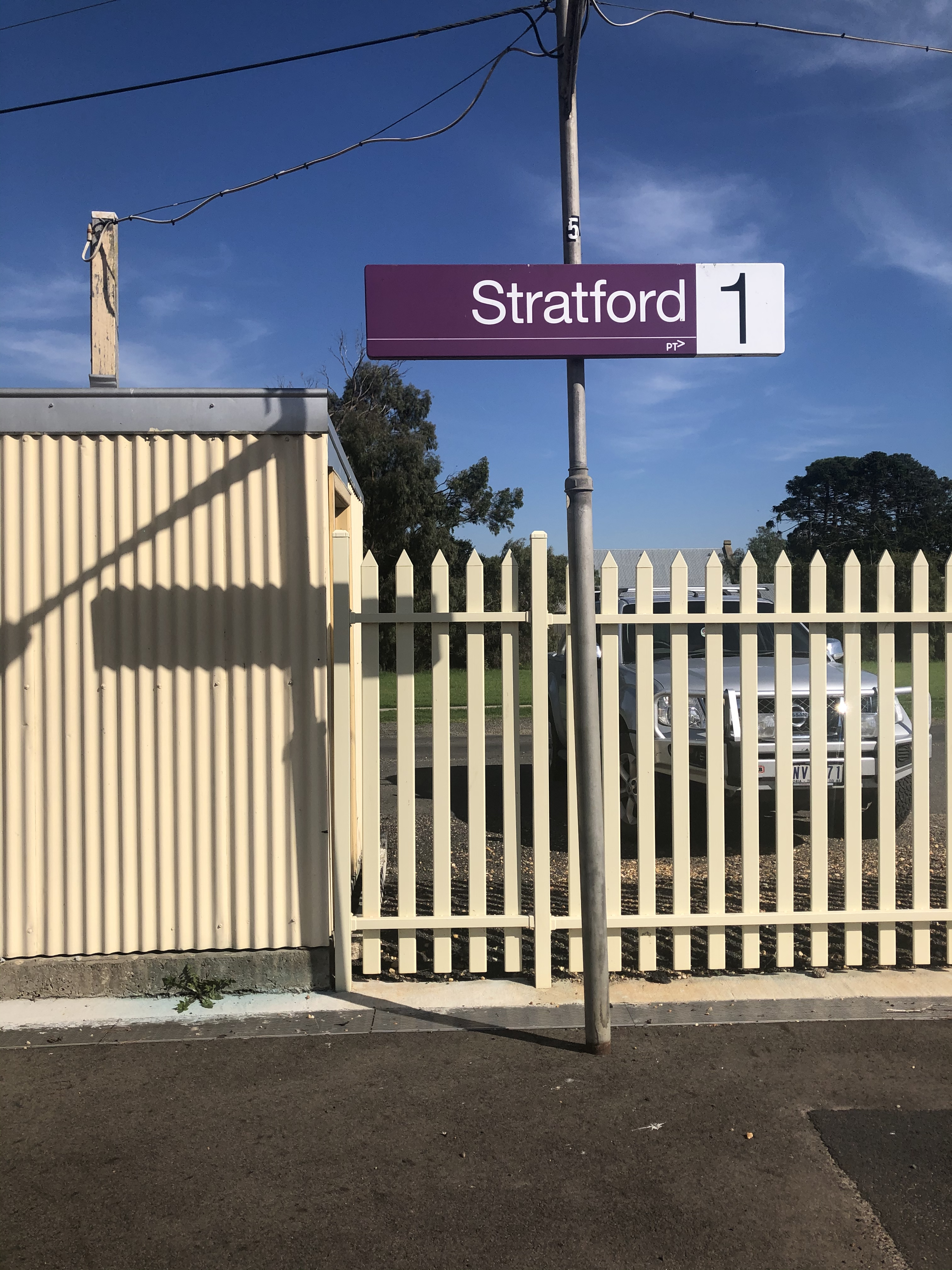
Platform signage, April 2021

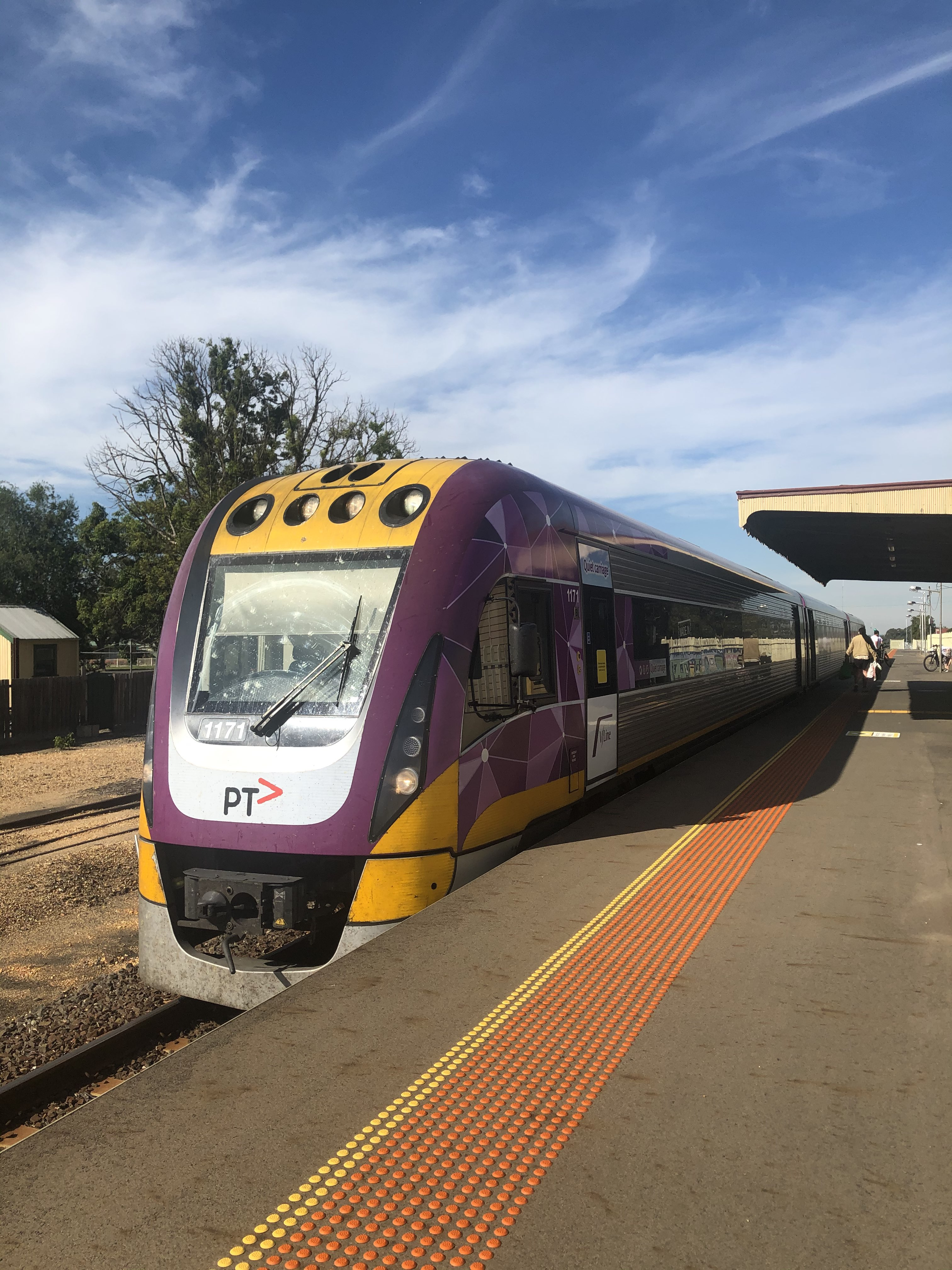
Rear of Southern Cross-bound VLocity train, April 2021
