= Little River (Avon, West Gippsland) =

River in Victoria, Australia

Little
- Mouth of the Little River in Victoria

Location
- Country: Australia
- State: Victoria
- Region: Victorian Alps (IBRA), West Gippsland
- LGA: Wellington

Physical characteristics
- Source: Great Dividing Range
  - location: Avon Wilderness Park
  - coordinates: 37°41′34″S 146°49′32″E
  - elevation: 869 m (2,851 ft)
- Mouth: Ben Cruachan Creek
  - coordinates: 37°43′25″S 146°47′40″E
  - elevation: 224 m (735 ft)
- Length: 7 km (4.3 mi)

Basin features
- River system: West Gippsland catchment
- National park: Avon Wilderness Park, Alpine NP

The Little River is a perennial river of the West Gippsland catchment, in the Alpine region of the Australian state of Victoria.

== Location and features ==
The Little River rises in remote country in the southern portion of the Avon Wilderness Park, south of Mount Hump, part of the Great Dividing Range within the Alpine National Park. The river flows generally southwest, then northwest, then southwest, then south, before reaching its confluence with the Ben Cruachan Creek within the Shire of Wellington. The Ben Cruachan Creek flows into the Avon River. Little River descends 645 metres (2,116 ft) over its 7-kilometre (4.3 mi) course.

== See also ==
- List of rivers of Australia § Victoria
