= Turton River =

River in Victoria, Australia

Turton Turton Creek
- Location of the Turton River mouth in Victoria

Location
- Country: Australia
- State: Victoria
- Region: South East Coastal Plain (IBRA), West Gippsland
- Local government area: Shire of Wellington

Physical characteristics
- Source: Mount Wellington, Great Dividing Range
  - location: below Trapyard Hill
  - elevation: 1,340 m (4,400 ft)
- Mouth: confluence with the Avon River
  - location: northwest of Briagolong
  - coordinates: 37°41′49″S 146°53′46″E
  - elevation: 221 m (725 ft)
- Length: 31 km (19 mi)

Basin features
- River system: West Gippsland catchment
- National park: Avon Wilderness Park

The Turton River is a perennial river of the West Gippsland catchment, in the Gippsland region of the Australian state of Victoria.

== Location and features ==
The Turton River rises below Trapyard Hill, drawing its source from the southeastern slopes of Mount Wellington and the southwestern slopes of the Moroka Range, both part of the Great Dividing Range. The river flows in a highly meandering course generally south, then west, before reaching its confluence with the Avon River northwest of Briagolong. The entire course of the river is contained within the Avon Wilderness Park. The river descends 1,120 metres (3,670 ft) over its 31-kilometre (19 mi) course.

== See also ==
- List of rivers of Australia § Victoria
