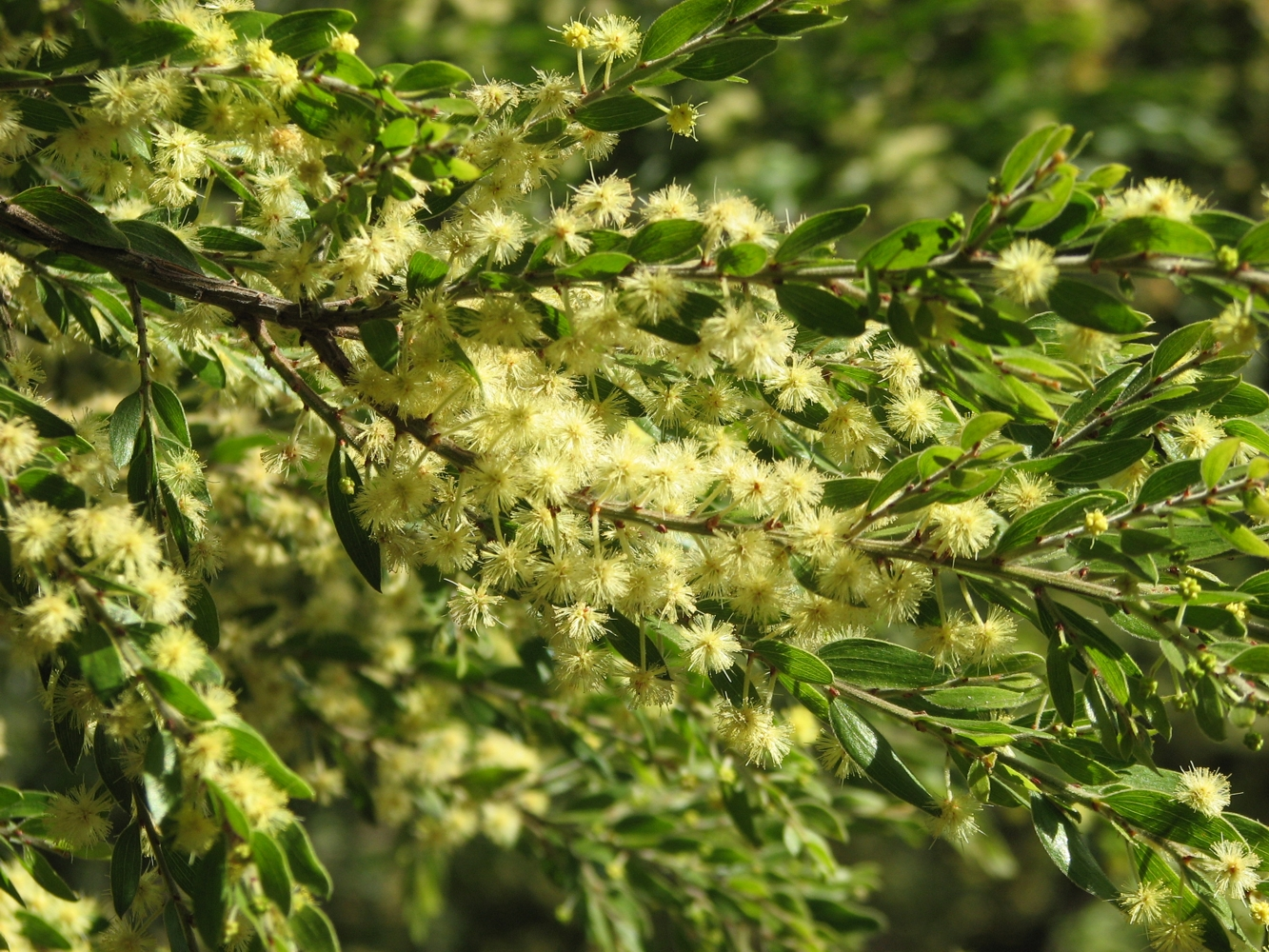

Conservation status
- Vulnerable (IUCN 3.1)

Scientific classification
- Kingdom: Plantae
- Clade: Tracheophytes
- Clade: Angiosperms
- Clade: Eudicots
- Clade: Rosids
- Order: Fabales
- Family: Fabaceae
- Subfamily: Caesalpinioideae
- Clade: Mimosoid clade
- Genus: Acacia
- Species: A. howittii

Binomial name
- Acacia howittii F.Muell.
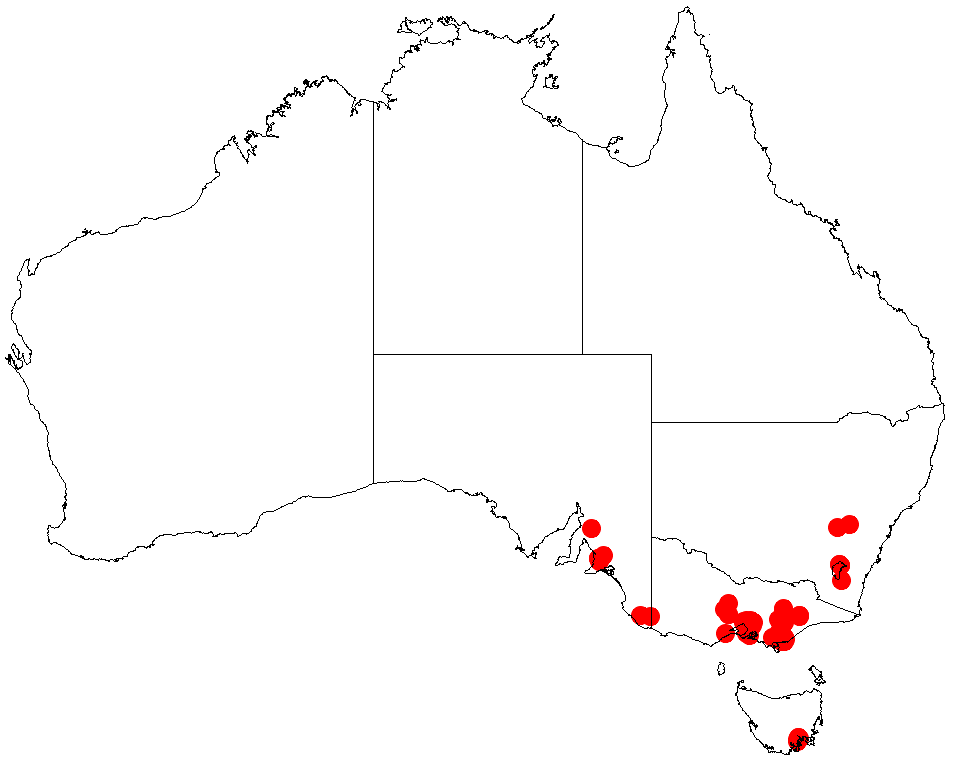
- Occurrence data from AVH

Synonyms
- Acacia howitti F.Muell. orth. var.; Racosperma howittii (F.Muell.) Pedley

= Acacia howittii =

Species of legume

Acacia howittii, commonly known as sticky wattle or Howitt's wattle, is a species of flowering plant in the family Fabaceae and is endemic to Victoria, Australia. It is a graceful shrub or small tree with pendulous branchlets, narrowly elliptic to lance-shaped phyllodes, spherical heads of pale lemon yellow flowers and narrowly oblong to linear, firmly papery to thinly leathery pods.

== Description ==
Acacia howittii is a graceful shrub or three that typically grows to a height of up to 9 m (30 ft) and it has slender, pendulous branchlets with hairy ribs. Its phyllodes are narrowly elliptic to lance-shaped, usually 15–25 mm (0.59–0.98 in) long, 4–8 mm (0.16–0.31 in) wide, dark green and glabrous with two or three veins on each face. The flowers are borne in one or two spherical heads in axils on peduncles 3–10 mm (0.12–0.39 in) long, each head with 12 to 20 pale lemon yellow flowers. Flowering mostly occurs in October, and the pods are narrowly oblong to linear, up to 60 mm (2.4 in) long, 4–5 mm (0.16–0.20 in) wide and firmly papery to thinly leathery and brown. The seeds are oblong, 3.5–4.0 mm (0.14–0.16 in) long, somewhat shiny dark brown with an aril on the end.

== Taxonomy ==
Acacia howittii was first formally described in 1893 by Ferdinand von Mueller in The Victorian Naturalist based on material collected by Alfred William Howitt, for whom the species is named.

== Distribution and habitat ==
Sticky wattle is native to eastern Victoria, from around the upper reaches of the Macalister River area near Mount Howitt in the north, and around Yarram in the south, extending east to around Tabberabbera where it is usually grows in moist forest environments. Although regarded as a rare species, it is commonly cultivated, and has become naturalised in areas outside its original range.

== See also ==
- List of Acacia species
