= Hillside railway station (disambiguation) =

Hillside railway station is a railway station in Southport, England.

It may also refer to:

== Australia ==
- Hillside railway station, Queensland, a closed station on the Fassifern line
- Hillside railway station, Victoria, a closed station on the Bairnsdale line

== United States ==
- Hillside station (LIRR), a closed station on the Long Island Rail Road in New York
