= Little River (Moroka River, Victoria) =

River in Victoria, Australia

Little
- Location of the Little River mouth in Victoria

Location
- Country: Australia
- State: Victoria
- Region: Australian Alps (IBRA), Victorian Alps
- LGA: Shire of Wellington

Physical characteristics
- Source: Moroka Range, Great Dividing Range
  - location: below Castle Hill
  - coordinates: 37°30′1″S 147°3′12″E
  - elevation: 1,230 m (4,040 ft)
- Mouth: confluence with the Moroka River
  - location: Alpine National Park
  - coordinates: 37°27′45″S 146°59′21″E
  - elevation: 991 m (3,251 ft)
- Length: 10 km (6.2 mi)

Basin features
- River system: Mitchell River catchment
- National park: Alpine NP

The Little River is a perennial river of the Mitchell River catchment, in the Alpine region of the Australian state of Victoria.

== Location and features ==
The Little River rises below Castle Hill, part of the Moroka Range within the Great Dividing Range, north of Avon Wilderness Park and flows generally northwest, before reaching its confluence with the Moroka River in remote country south of the Moroka Gorge within the Alpine National Park in the Shire of Wellington. The river descends 239 metres (784 ft) over its 10-kilometre (6.2 mi) course.

== See also ==
- List of rivers in Australia
