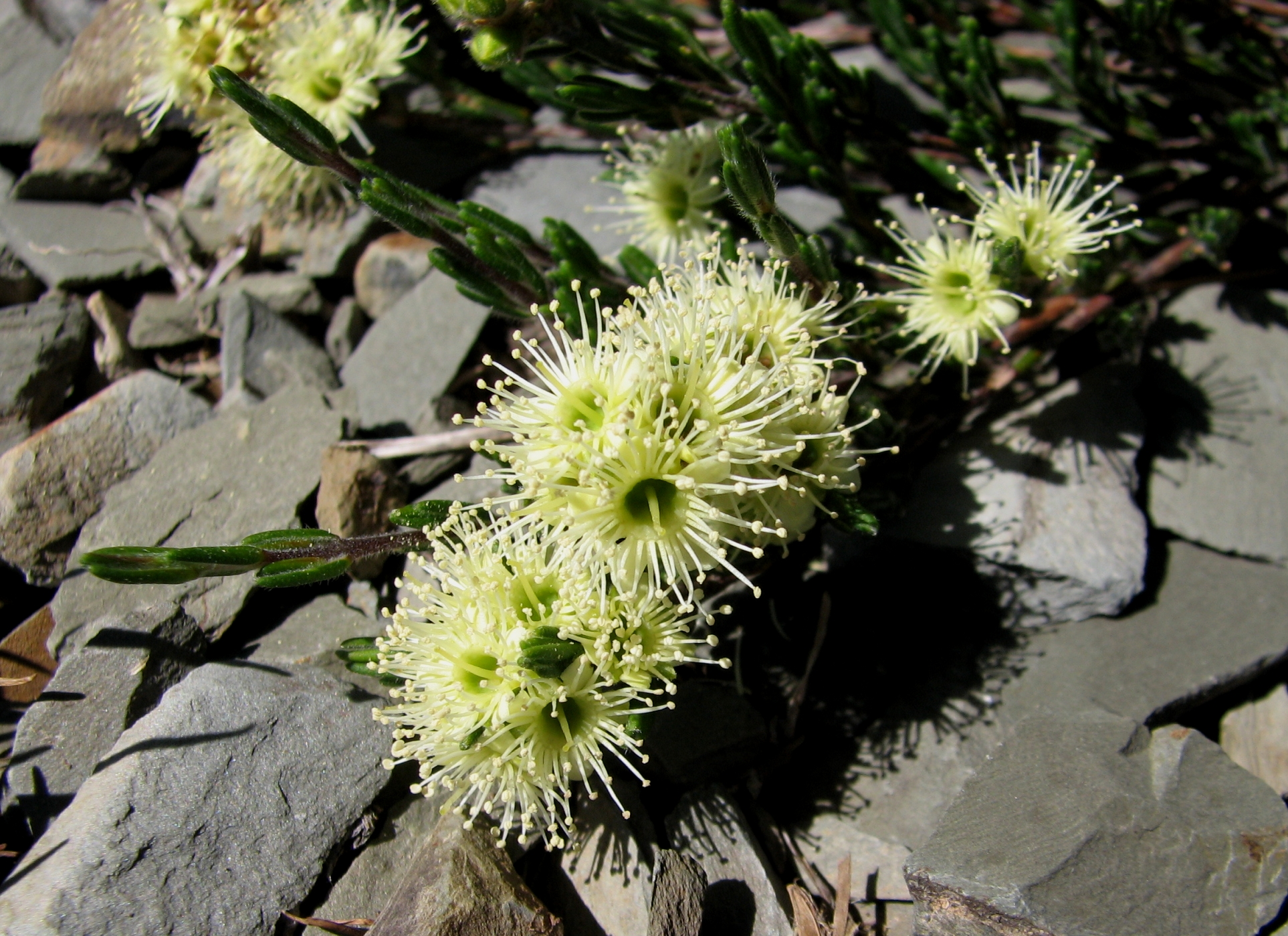
- Plant in flower at Mount Hotham, Victoria

Scientific classification
- Kingdom: Plantae
- Clade: Tracheophytes
- Clade: Angiosperms
- Clade: Eudicots
- Clade: Rosids
- Order: Myrtales
- Family: Myrtaceae
- Genus: Kunzea
- Species: K. muelleri

Binomial name
- Kunzea muelleri Benth.

= Kunzea muelleri =

Yellow kunzea

Species of flowering plant

Kunzea muelleri, commonly known as yellow kunzea, is a flowering plant in the myrtle family, Myrtaceae and is endemic to mountainous areas of south-eastern Australia. It is a low-growing, spreading shrub with linear leaves and small groups of pale yellow, stalkless flowers that appear in the summer.

== Description ==
Kunzea muelleri is a spreading shrub which grows to a height of 0.3–0.8 m (1–3 ft) with its branches sometimes forming adventitious roots. The leaves are arranged in more or less opposite pairs and are linear, more or less cylindrical in shape, 2.5–4.5 mm (0.1–0.2 in) long and less than 1 mm (0.04 in) wide with a petiole less than 0.5 mm (0.02 in) long. The flowers are arranged in groups of mostly two or three near the ends of the branches. There are egg-shaped bracts 3–4 mm (0.1–0.2 in) long and 1–1.5 mm (0.04–0.06 in) wide and similar-sized paired bracteoles at the base of the flowers. The floral cup is hairy and 3–4 mm (0.1–0.2 in) long. The sepal lobes are egg-shaped to triangular, 1–1.5 mm (0.04–0.06 in) long and hairy. The petals are pale yellow, more or less round and about 1.5 mm (0.06 in) long. There are about 24-35 stamens which are 3.5–4.5 mm (0.1–0.2 in) long. Flowering occurs from November to January and is followed by fruit which are drupes which are about 4 mm (0.2 in) long and 3 mm (0.1 in) wide.

== Taxonomy and naming ==
Kunzea muelleri was first formally described in 1867 English botanist George Bentham in his publication Flora Australiensis from a specimen collected by Victorian Government Botanist Ferdinand von Mueller. Mueller collected plants from the Haidinger Range, Mount Wellington and the Munyang Mountains and had given the species the name Kunzea ericifolia in 1855. This name was later deemed illegitimate as it has been previously assigned to another species. The specific epithet (muelleri) honours Mueller.

== Distribution and habitat ==
This kunzea grows in alpine, subalpine and montane heath and is common in rocky areas. It sometimes forms extensive stands and in the Kosciuszko National Park, groups of plants up to 20 cm (8 in) high cover large areas.
