= Moroka River =

Moroka
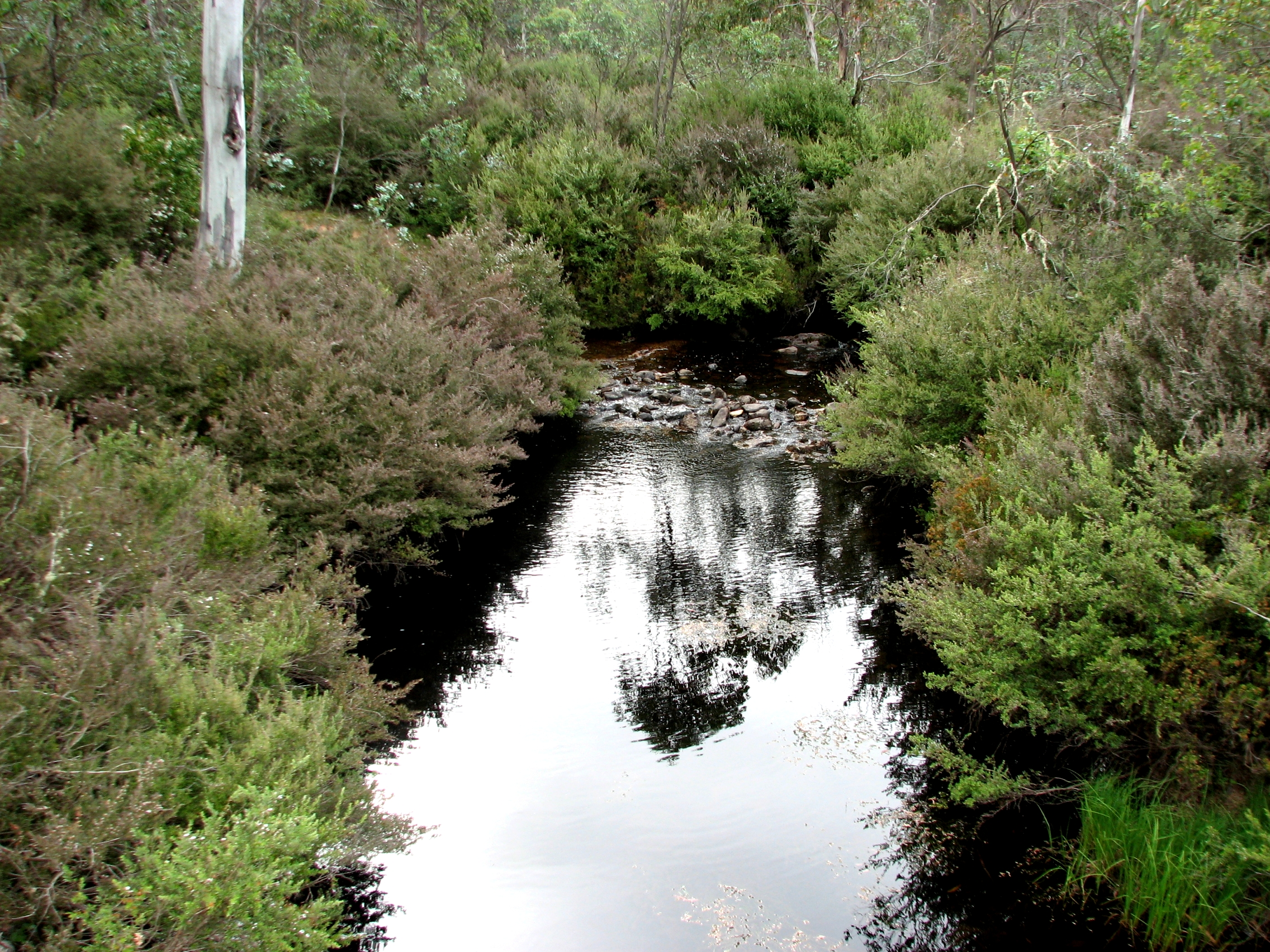
- The upper reaches of the Moroka River, viewed from Moroka Road bridge

- Location of the Moroka River mouth in Victoria

Location
- Country: Australia
- State: Victoria
- Region: Australian Alps (IBRA), Victorian Alps
- Local government area: Shire of Wellington

Physical characteristics
- Source: Mount Wellington, Great Dividing Range
  - location: below Picture Point
  - coordinates: 37°29′36″S 149°49′15″E
  - elevation: 1,580 m (5,180 ft)
- Mouth: Wonnangatta River
  - location: Alpine National Park
  - coordinates: 37°20′16″S 146°55′2″E
  - elevation: 353 m (1,158 ft)
- Length: 48 km (30 mi)

Basin features
- River system: Mitchell River catchment
- Tributaries
  - left: Playboy Creek
  - right: Carey Creek, Little River (Moroka)
- National park: Alpine NP

The Moroka River is a perennial river of the Mitchell River catchment, in the Alpine region of the Australian state of Victoria.

== Location and features ==
The Moroka River rises below Picture Point near Mount Wellington on the Great Dividing Range, north of Avon Wilderness Park. This river flows generally east, then northeast, then north, then in a highly meandering course generally northwest, then north, and finally northeast, joined by three tributaries including the Little River (Moroka), before reaching its confluence with the Wonnangatta River in remote country within the Alpine National Park in the Shire of Wellington. The river descends 1,220 metres (4,000 ft) over its 48-kilometre (30 mi) course.

The river flows through the Moroka Gorge, nestled below Mount Kent, Mount Dawson, Cromwell Knob, and Billy Goat Bluff. A walking track commences at Horseyard Flat near Moroka Road and follows the river for approximately 3 kilometres (1.9 mi) downstream to the First Falls, which can be viewed from a rock platform. Beyond First Falls, the route is unmarked and difficult.

== See also ==
- List of rivers in Australia
