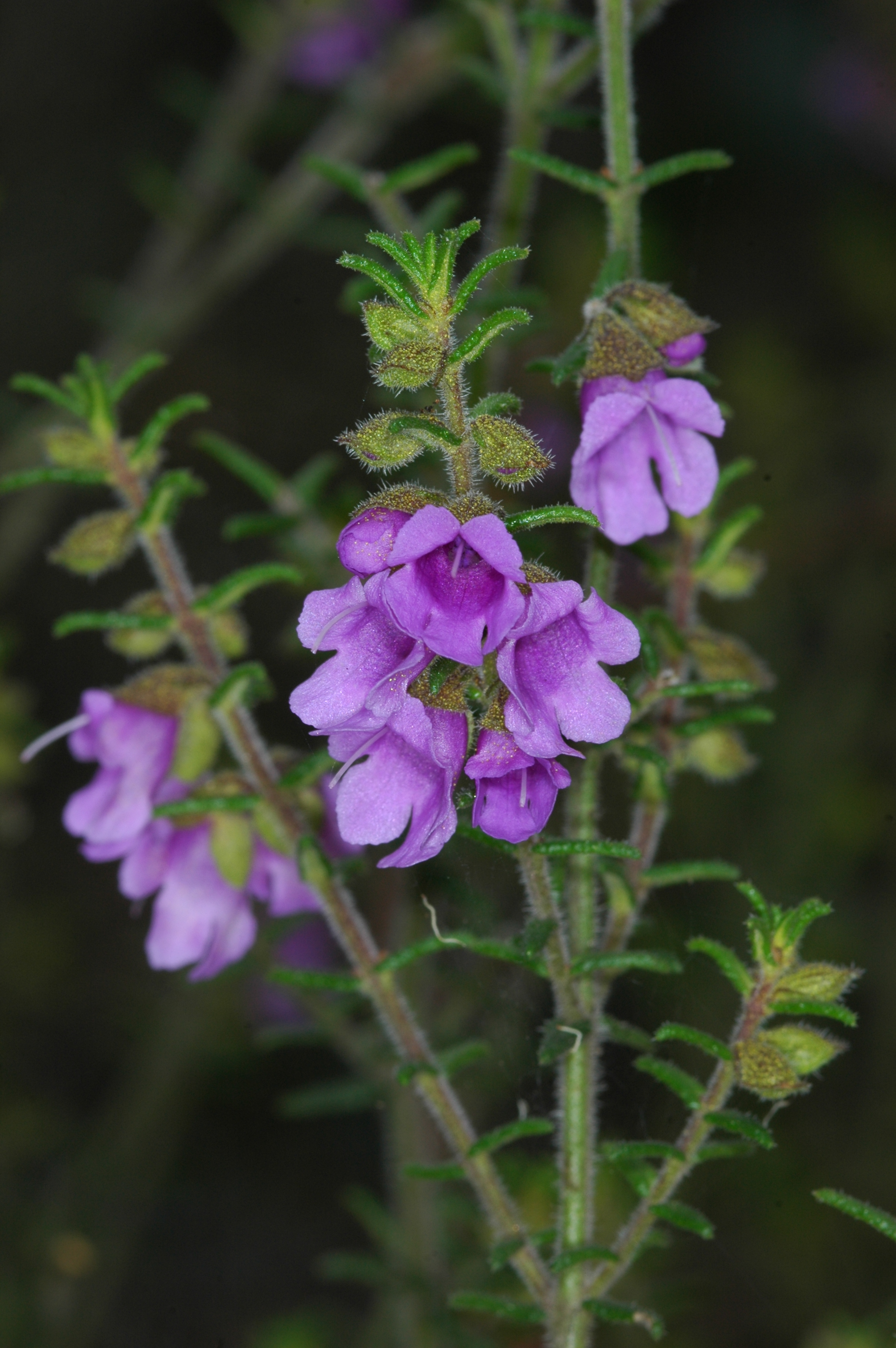

Scientific classification
- Kingdom: Plantae
- Clade: Tracheophytes
- Clade: Angiosperms
- Clade: Eudicots
- Clade: Asterids
- Order: Lamiales
- Family: Lamiaceae
- Genus: Prostanthera
- Species: P. decussata

Binomial name
- Prostanthera decussata F.Muell.
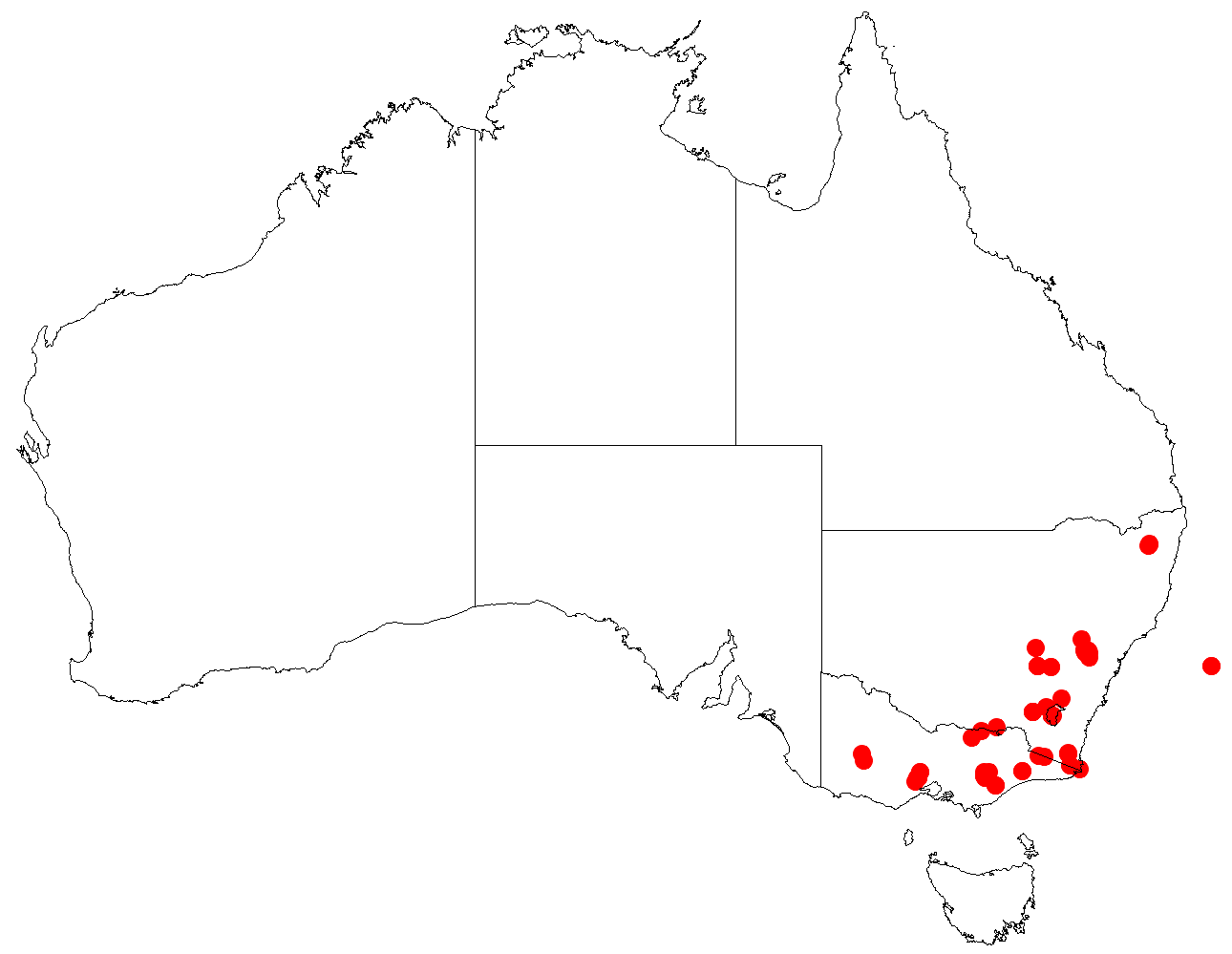
- Occurrence data from AVH

= Prostanthera decussata =

Dense mintbush

Species of plant

Prostanthera decussata, commonly known as dense mintbush, species of flowering plant that is endemic south-eastern Australia. It is a dense, compact, strongly aromatic shrub with egg-shaped leaves and mauve to violet flowers with yellow streaks, arranged in leaf axils near the ends of branchlets.

== Description ==
Prostanthera decussata is a dense, compact, strongly aromatic shrub that typically grows to a height of up to 2 m (6 ft 7 in). The leaves are egg-shaped, 4–7 mm (0.16–0.28 in) long, 1–3.5 mm (0.039–0.138 in) wide and sessile or on a petiole up to 0.6 mm (0.024 in) long. They are dark green on top and paler on the underside. The flowers are arranged in leaf axils near the ends of branchlets with bracteoles 2.5–3 mm (0.098–0.118 in) long at the base. The sepals are 3.5–4 mm (0.14–0.16 in) long forming a tube 1–1.5 mm (0.039–0.059 in) long with two lobes, the upper lobe 2–2.5 mm (0.079–0.098 in) long. The petals are mauve to violet, occasionally pinkish, 6–8 mm (0.24–0.31 in) long. Flowering occurs from October to March.

== Taxonomy and naming ==
This species was formally described in 1859 by Victorian Government Botanist Ferdinand von Mueller in Fragmenta phytographiae Australiae, based on plant material collected in mountainous country near the Macalister River in Victoria. The specific epithet (decussata) is from the Latin decussatus meaning "formed crosswise like the letter X".

== Distribution and habitat ==
Dense mintbush grows in heath, forest and woodland in the eastern half of Victoria, in the Australian Capital Territory and mainly in the south-eastern part of New South Wales.
