= Rosedale station =

Rosedale station may refer to:

- Rosedale (LIRR station), a commuter rail station in Queens, New York City, New York, United States
- Rosedale railway station, a railway station in Victoria, Australia
- Rosedale station (Toronto), a subway station in Ontario, Canada
- Rosedale Station, Alberta, a community in Canada
