= Lake Tali Karng =

Lake in Victoria, Australia

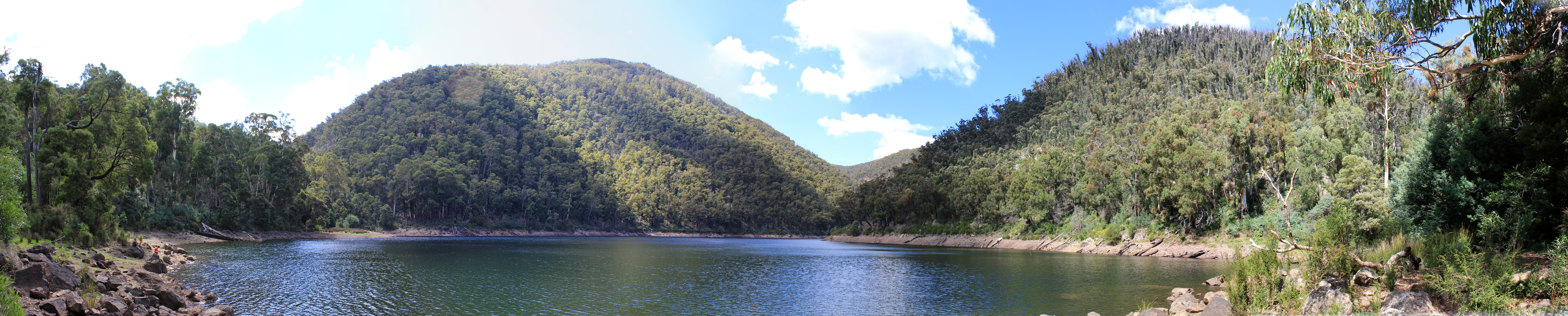
- Tali Karng

- Location in Victoria
- Location: Alpine region, Victoria
- Coordinates: 37°32′35″S 146°47′47″E
- Primary inflows: Snowden Creek; Nigothoruk Creek
- Primary outflows: underground to Wellington River
- Basin countries: Australia
- Surface area: 14 ha (35 acres)
- Max. depth: 51 m (167 ft)

Lake Tali Karng is a natural lake in the Alpine region of Victoria, in eastern Australia. At 14 hectares (35 acres) in area and 51 metres (167 ft) in depth, it is the only deep highland lake in Victoria. It was formed by a landslide 1,500 years ago.

Unlike alpine lakes in the Snowy Mountains, Lake Tali Karng is the only permanent, deep, highland lake in Australia that is not of glacial or volcanic origin. It was formed by debris falling from the Sentinel, which is 700 metres (2,300 ft) above the valley. The landslide dammed the Wellington River with the area of the landslide now known as the Valley of Destruction. The lake has no stream outlet, and has never been known to overflow, with water seeping away through the Valley of Destruction.

Two creeks feed the lake, Snowden Creek and Nigothoruk Creek. Nigothoruk Creek has three waterfalls, collectively called the Snowden Falls. There is no vegetation in the lake itself because the water is slightly acidic. Its maximum depth is 51 metres (167 ft) and, due to the minimal sunlight falling on it, together with the snow-melt which feeds it, it remains cold throughout the year.

== Traditional custodians ==
Tali Karng lies in the traditional lands of the Gunai Kurnai people, who hold it as a sacred place. In keeping with their law, uninitiated Aboriginal people are forbidden to visit the lake. Young Kurnai visit the lake with elders as part of initiation. They walk to the lake from the downstream and leave upstream, travel the Wellington high plains to Moroka, and down the valley to the Blue Pool near Briagolong, making the connection to the two important places. The journey takes at least four days. The Gunai Kurnai are, however, tolerant of non-indigenous people visiting Tali Karng provided they treat the area with respect. That includes requesting visitors not to camp at the lake. Visitors are asked to camp either above the lake at the southern end of the Wellington Plains or below the lake in the Valley of Destruction along the Wellington River.

== Recreation activities ==
=== Camping ===
The most popular camping area has traditionally been the western end of the lake, where there are large grassy areas. Camping is also possible at the eastern end, although that area is hard to access. Water from the lake must be boiled, although water coming from the side creeks is drinkable. Fires are not permitted near the lake so all campers must be equipped with a fuel stove.

Camping at the lake is now discouraged and alternative camping, with basic facilities, is available at Nyimba campsite, near the site of the former Riggall Hut at the southern end of the Wellington Plains. Campfires are allowed there and water is generally available from a nearby creek. There is also informal camping along the Wellington River below the lake. Permits are not required.

The area can be quite crowded at Easter, Melbourne Cup Weekend and other holidays, but compared to other areas in the Alps, which are accessible by motor vehicles, it is a peaceful location.

=== Access ===
Tali Karng is difficult to access, with the quickest route, from MacFarlanes Saddle via the Wellington Plains track, involving a hard five-hour walk. That includes an 800 metres (2,600 ft) descent, either via the Gillios Track or the Riggalls Spur track. Riggalls Spur has the only view of the lake from Echo Point, but is a little overgrown. Alternative access to the lake is by a 15 kilometres (9.3 mi) walk up the Wellington River. That necessitates 15 river crossings, and can be quite dangerous, particularly under high river conditions. The final passage through the Valley of Destruction can be particularly challenging, given the small boulders which must be traversed. That is a difficult area for camping, with space only for small tents.

A further access route approaches via Mount Margaret, which begins a short distance from Licola.

The bushfires of December 2006 burnt much of the surrounding forest although, as of January 2008, regrowth was well under way. Trees along the Wellington Plains track had not re-grown as well due to the exposed nature of the area, so there is little shade on that section of walk. All approaches are now open.

=== Surrounding attractions ===
Although the lake itself is likely to be the focus of a bushwalk, the surrounding high plains are also of interest. Mount Spion Kopje, about 3.7 kilometres (2.3 mi) to the north east, is one of the higher nearby mountains, and provides an excellent view over much of Gippsland from its dolerite-capped summit. The Wellington Plains offer expansive views, as does Mount Wellington.

== See also ==
- List of lakes of Australia § Victoria
