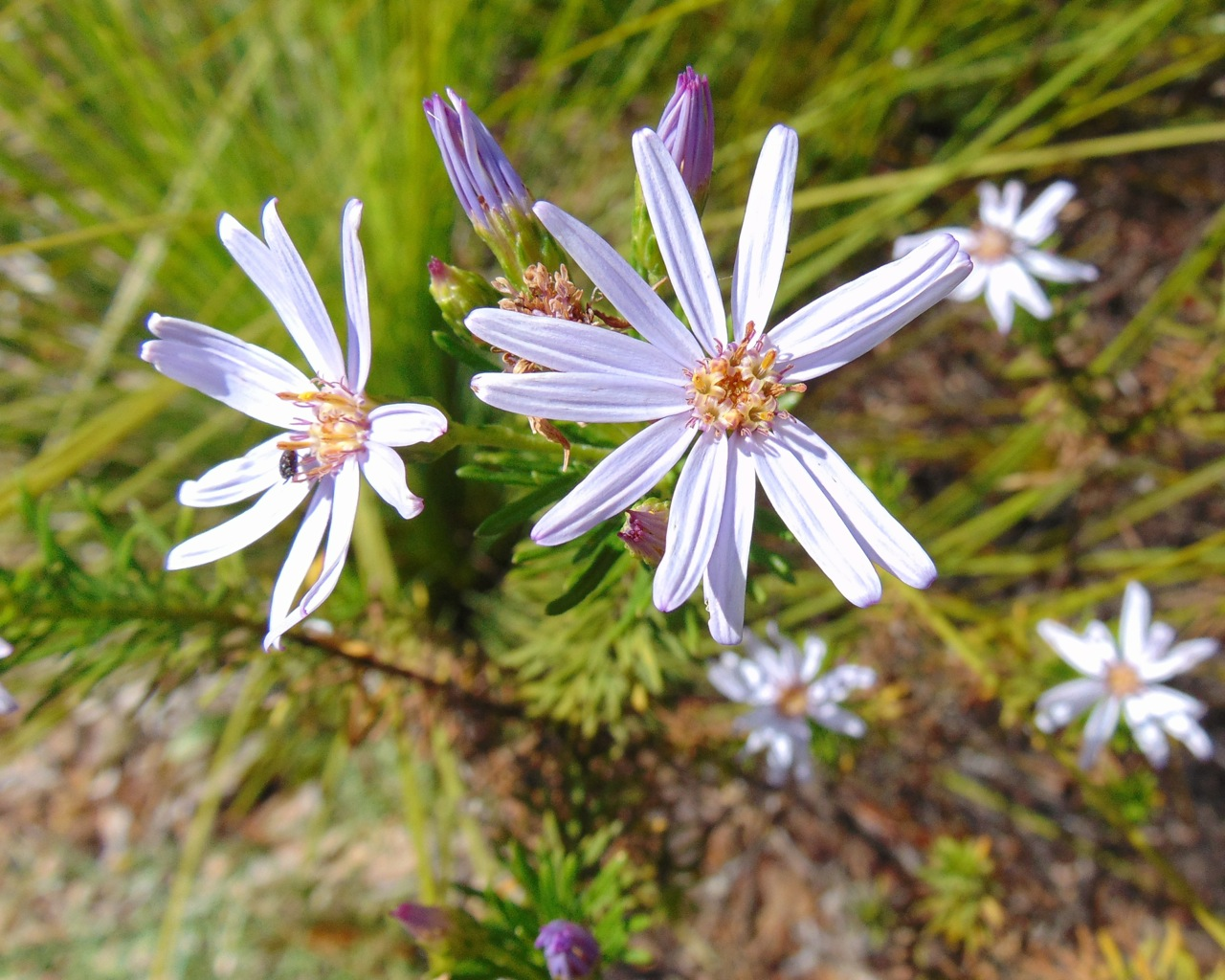
- Olearia tenuifolia growing in the ANBG

Scientific classification
- Kingdom: Plantae
- Clade: Tracheophytes
- Clade: Angiosperms
- Clade: Eudicots
- Clade: Asterids
- Order: Asterales
- Family: Asteraceae
- Genus: Olearia
- Species: O. tenuifolia

Binomial name
- Olearia tenuifolia (D.C) Benth.

= Olearia tenuifolia =

Thin-leaf daisy-bush

Species of shrub

Olearia tenuifolia, commonly known as the thin-leaf daisy-bush, is a small shrub that is endemic to the south-east of continental Australia and has narrow leaves and clusters of blue, deep mauve to purple flowers.

== Description ==
Olearia tenuifolia is a shrub to 2 m (6 ft 7 in) high with scattered leaves arranged alternately along the stem. The leaves are linear shaped, 5–35 mm (0.20–1.38 in) long, 1–2.5 mm (0.039–0.098 in) wide, pointed at the apex, margins smooth or toothed and distinctly rolled under, both surfaces glandular. The flowers are mauve, purple or blue with a yellow disc floret, borne singly or in loose clusters at the end of branches on a peduncle 30 mm (1.2 in) long. Flowering may occur anytime throughout the year and the fruit is a dry, silky achene.

== Taxonomy and naming ==
Olearia tenuifolia was first formally described in 1867 by George Bentham and the description was published in Flora Australiensis. The specific epithet (tenuifolia) means "slender".

== Distribution and habitat ==
Thin-leaf daisy-bush grows in New South Wales in woodland, mallee and sclerophyll forests mostly in rocky locations south of Dunedoo and west of Griffith. In Victoria it is considered rare and grows in rocky, dry locations in the Licola Creek and Valencia Creek area, and the upper Buchan River valley and Pine Mountain district.
