= Perry River (Victoria) =

River in Victoria, Australia

Perry Providence Ponds
- Location of the Perry River mouth in Victoria
- Etymology: In honour of Captain Samuel Perry
- Native name: Goomballa (Kurnai)

Location
- Country: Australia
- State: Victoria
- Region: South East Coastal Plain (IBRA), East Gippsland
- Local government area: Shire of Wellington

Physical characteristics
- Source
  - location: Fernbank
  - elevation: 66 m (217 ft)
- Mouth: confluence with the Avon River
  - location: southeast of Stratford
  - coordinates: 38°2′38″S 147°15′50″E
  - elevation: 3 m (9.8 ft)
- Length: 29 km (18 mi)

Basin features
- River system: East Gippsland catchment
- Tributaries
  - right: Sandy Creek (Perry River, Victoria), Jones Creek (Perry River, Victoria), Fiddlers Creek
- National park: The Lakes National Park

The Perry River is a perennial river of the East Gippsland catchment, in the Gippsland region of the Australian state of Victoria.

== Location and features ==
The Perry River rises near Fernbank on the East Gippsland plain and flows in a highly meandering course generally south, joined by three minor tributaries before reaching its confluence with the Avon River before the Avon empties into Lake Wellington southeast of Stratford. Within Lake Wellington, the Avon forms its confluence with the Latrobe River, empties into Bass Strait via the Mitchell River south of Lakes Entrance. The river descends 63 metres (207 ft) over its 29-kilometre (18 mi) course.

== Etymology ==
In the Aboriginal Brataualung language the name for the river is Goomballa, meaning "climbing".

The river was named in 1840 by Count Paweł Strzelecki after Captain Samuel Perry, deputy Surveyor General of New South Wales.

== See also ==
- List of rivers of Australia § Victoria
