= Carey River =

Carey Wellington River Left Branch
- Location of the Carey River mouth in Victoria

Location
- Country: Australia
- State: Victoria
- Region: Victorian Alps (IBRA)
- Local government area: Shire of Wellington

Physical characteristics
- Source: Snowy Range, Great Dividing Range
  - location: below Nre Surveyors Creek Camp
  - coordinates: 37°25′14″S 146°47′20″E
  - elevation: 1,370 m (4,490 ft)
- Mouth: confluence with the Wellington River
  - location: in remote state forest
  - coordinates: 37°32′14″S 146°43′2″E
  - elevation: 473 m (1,552 ft)
- Length: 17 km (11 mi)

Basin features
- River system: West Gippsland catchment
- Tributaries
  - left: McFarlane Creek
- National parks: Alpine NP

The Carey River is a perennial river of the West Gippsland catchment, in the Alpine region of the Australian state of Victoria.

== Features and location ==
The Carey River rises below Nre Surveyors Creek Camp within the Snowy Range of the Great Dividing Range. The river flows through parts of the Alpine National Park, generally south by west, joined by one minor tributary, before reaching its confluence with the Wellington River in a remote state forestry area in the Shire of Wellington. The river descends 900 metres (3,000 ft) over its 17-kilometre (11 mi) course.

== See also ==
- List of rivers of Australia § Victoria
