= Dolodrook River =

River in Victoria Australia

Dolodrook Wellington River Right Branch, Doledrook
- Location of the Dolodrook River mouth in Victoria

Location
- Country: Australia
- State: Victoria
- Region: Victorian Alps (IBRA)
- Local government area: Shire of Wellington

Physical characteristics
- Source: Snowy Range, Great Dividing Range
  - location: below Gable End
  - coordinates: 37°32′7″S 146°47′2″E
  - elevation: 1,080 m (3,540 ft)
- Mouth: confluence with the Wellington River
  - location: in remote state forest
  - coordinates: 37°34′30″S 146°47′45″E
  - elevation: 436 m (1,430 ft)
- Length: 13 km (8.1 mi)

Basin features
- River system: West Gippsland catchment
- National parks: Alpine NP

The Dolodrook River is a perennial river of the West Gippsland catchment, in the Alpine region of the Australian state of Victoria.

== Features and location ==
The Dolodrook River rises below Gable End within the Snowy Range of the Great Dividing Range. The river flows through parts of the Alpine National Park, generally west, then west by north, then north, before reaching its confluence with the Wellington River in a remote state forestry area in the Shire of Wellington. The river descends 639 metres (2,096 ft) over its 13-kilometre (8.1 mi) course.

== See also ==
- List of rivers of Australia § Victoria
