= Powerscourt siding =

Former railway siding in Victoria, Australia

Coordinates: 37°58′35″S 147°1′28″E

Powerscourt

General information
- Line: Maffra
- Platforms: 1
- Tracks: 1

Other information
- Status: Closed

Services
Preceding station	Disused railways	Following station
Maffra	Maffra line	Stratford
List of closed railway stations in Victoria
Location

Powerscourt is a closed railway siding located 5 km (3 mi) east of Maffra, on the Maffra railway line in Victoria, Australia. It was 223 km (139 mi) from Southern Cross station. The siding was used to load sugar beet.

== History ==
In 1914, it was reported that Aboriginal bones were found while excavating at the siding, as well as stone axes and other similar materials. As of 1915, a weighbridge from Kilmany railway station was to be erected at the siding. An accident took place at the siding on 3 June 1919, where a horse carrying beet heading up to the siding slipped. The horse was not injured. As of 2005, the siding can still be seen with a "keen eye".
