= Samuel Augustus Perry =

Welsh officer and professor

- Born: 17 March 1787; Wales
- Died: 15 January 1854 (aged 66); Kiama, New South Wales, Australia
- Occupations: Soldier; Surveyor
- Spouse: Caroline Johnson

Samuel Augustus Perry (17 March 1787 – 15 January 1854) was an English-born soldier and surveyor.

== Biography ==
=== Early life ===
Samuel Augustus Perry was born on 17 March 1787 in Wales. He was baptized on 12 September 1791 in Holborn, London. He was the son of Jabez Perry, goldbeater, and his wife Ann.

=== Career ===
He was appointed an ensign in the Royal Staff Corps in 1809 and promoted to lieutenant in 1811.

In 1819, he was appointed professor of topographical drawing at the Royal Military College, a position he occupied until 1823. He then served in the Peninsular war under Sir George Murray and was present at Badajoz, Nivelle and Nive. When the bridge over the Tagus at Alcantara was broken, he distinguished himself by filling the gap with a 'flying bridge' to carry the guns. Perry, with Captain William Dumaresq, was responsible for returning to Venice the four bronze horses of St Mark's which Napoleon had removed to Paris.

In 1824 he went to Dominica as private secretary and colonial aide-de-camp to the governor, Major-General William Nicolay. Because of ill health he was compelled in 1827 to return to England where he lived on half-pay at Ampfield, Hampshire. In 1829, Perry was appointed Deputy Surveyor General of New South Wales by Sir George Murray (who was by then secretary of state), and arrived in Sydney in August 1829 aboard the Sovereign with his wife, Caroline, and six children. Perry was responsible for surveying much of Sydney and the surrounding areas, as well as Queensland. In August 1852 Perry was given leave on the grounds of ill health. In April 1853 his leave was extended but in July he felt compelled to ask permission to retire, and his retirement became effective in October of that year.

=== Personal life ===
On 12 April 1817 at St Paul's Church, Hammersmith, London, he married Caroline Elizabeth Johnson, daughter of James Johnson of Baker Street, London. They had ten children. Samuel Augustus Perry was a watercolorist, surveyor and soldier. He also owned 100 acres of land and developed a neighborhood that he called Broughton, in what is now called the Leichhardt area of Sydney. Upon his retirement in October 1853, he and his wife spent their remaining years at Kiama. Mrs. Caroline Perry died in December 1853. S A Perry died on 15 January 1854. They were survived by nine of their ten children.

=== Death ===
He died on 15 January 1854 in Kiama, New South Wales.

=== Legacy ===
- Perry River (Victoria) was named after Perry by Paweł Edmund Strzelecki (1797–1873) in 1840.
