= Fernbank, Victoria =

Fernbank
- Town
- Coordinates: 37°52′S 147°20′E
- Country: Australia
- State: Victoria
- Region: Gippsland
- LGA: Shire of East Gippsland
- Location: 310 km (190 mi) E of Melbourne; 40 km (25 mi) NE of Sale; 30 km (19 mi) W of Bairnsdale

Government
  - State electorate: Gippsland East
  - Federal division: Gippsland
- Elevation: 122 m (400 ft)

Population
  - Total: 152 (2016 census)
- Postcode: 3864
- County: Australia
- Mean max temp: 19.6 °C (67.3 °F)
- Mean min temp: 7.4 °C (45.3 °F)
- Annual rainfall: 510.9 mm (20.11 in)

Fernbank is a locality on the Perry River in Victoria, Australia, approximately 310 km east of Melbourne. In the 2016 census, it had a population of 152. With the main highway, Princes Highway close by, the small community not only services itself, but travellers along the main highway that stop for a break.

== History ==
The origin of the Fernbank's name is somewhat of a mystery. It is commonly believed that the locality was named after the plants that grow by the banks of the Perry River, the fern, giving rise to the name, Fern-bank.

Fernbank Post Office opened on 1 January 1868 and closed in 1977.

== Today ==
Approximately 2.5 km south-west of Fernbank is the Fernbank Landscape and Flora Reserve, just off of the main highway, Princes Highway. There are some walking tracks and picnic spots.

== Transport ==
Fernbank used to be serviced by the Bairnsdale railway line, but the station closed to passengers in 1981 and then fully closed in 1996.
