= Rosedale railway station =

Railway station in Victoria, Australia

Rosedale
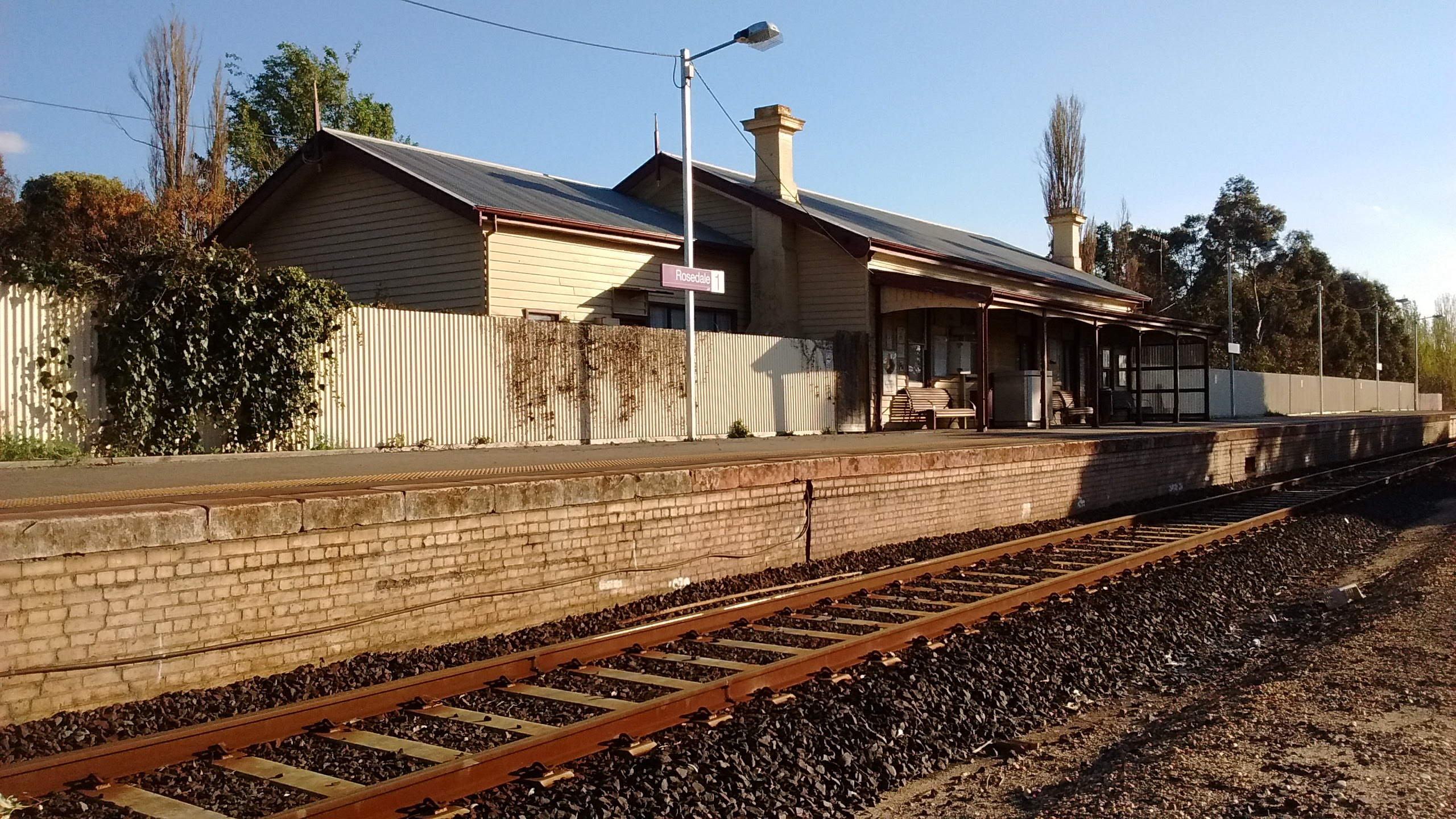
- North-east bound view of the station building and platform, September 2017

General information
- Location: Willung Road, Rosedale, Victoria 3847; Shire of Wellington; Australia
- Coordinates: 38°09′24″S 146°47′13″E
- System: PTV regional rail station
- Owner: VicTrack
- Operator: V/Line
- Line: Gippsland
- Distance: 180.37 kilometres from Southern Cross
- Platforms: 1
- Tracks: 1

Construction
- Structure type: At-grade

Other information
- Status: Operational, unstaffed
- Station code: ROE
- Fare zone: Myki zone 14
- Website: Public Transport Victoria

History
- Opened: 1 June 1877; 149 years ago

Services
Preceding station	V/Line	Following station
Traralgon towards Southern Cross	Gippsland line	Sale towards Bairnsdale

Victorian Heritage Register
- Official name: Rosedale Railway Station Complex
- Designated: 20 August 1982
- Reference no.: VHR H1589
Location
- Location within Victoria

Rosedale railway station is a regional railway station on the Gippsland line, part of the Victorian railway network. It serves the town of Rosedale, in Victoria, Australia. Rosedale station is a ground level unstaffed station, featuring one side platform. It opened on 1 June 1877.

== History ==
Rosedale opened on 1 June 1877, when the line was extended from Morwell to Sale. The station, like the township itself, was named after the wife of the leaseholder of Snakes Ridge, a pastoral run which was taken up in 1842 and was located to the north and south of present day Rosedale.

In June 1987, Rosedale was abolished as an electric staff station, and was replaced with the electric staff section Traralgon – Sale.

== Platforms and services ==
Rosedale has one platform. It is serviced by V/Line Bairnsdale line services.

Rosedale platform arrangement
Platform	Line	Destination
1	Bairnsdale line	Southern Cross, Bairnsdale
