= Munro railway station =

Former railway station in Victoria, Australia

Coordinates: 37°55′05″S 147°11′08″E

Munro

General information
- Line: Bairnsdale
- Platforms: 2
- Tracks: 2

Other information
- Status: Closed

History
- Opened: 1862
- Closed: 1982

Services
Preceding station	V/Line	Following station
Stratford towards Southern Cross	Bairnsdale line	Fernbank towards Bairnsdale
List of closed railway stations in Victoria
Location

Munro is a closed station located in the town of Munro, on the Bairnsdale railway line railway line in Victoria, Australia. It was 233 km from Southern Cross station.

The passenger platform was abolished by mid 1975, along with the goods platform. In March 1977, the Munro and Stockdale Parents and Citizens' Committee was formed, in part as a result of VicRail reviewing the viability of the siding. The group wrote to parliamentarians and the Avon Shire Council, asking them to support the siding. Avon Shire Council ultimately ended up writing to VicRail, requesting that the siding be retained.
