= Wellington River =

River in Victoria, Australia

Wellington
- Location of the Wellington River mouth in Victoria

Location
- Country: Australia
- State: Victoria
- Region: Victorian Alps (IBRA)
- Local government area: Shire of Wellington

Physical characteristics
- Source: Snowy Range, Great Dividing Range
  - location: below The Sentinels
  - coordinates: 37°32′7″S 146°47′2″E
  - elevation: 1,030 m (3,380 ft)
- Mouth: confluence with the Macalister River
  - location: north of Licola
  - coordinates: 37°36′14″S 146°38′7″E
  - elevation: 213 m (699 ft)
- Length: 40 km (25 mi)

Basin features
- River system: West Gippsland catchment
- Tributaries
  - left: Dolodrook River
  - right: Carey River, Breakfast Creek (Victoria)
- National parks: Alpine NP, Avon Wilderness

The Wellington River is a perennial river of the West Gippsland catchment, in the Alpine region of the Australian state of Victoria.

== Features and location ==
The Wellington River rises below The Sentinels within the Snowy Range of the Great Dividing Range. The river flows through parts of the Alpine National Park and Avon Wilderness Park in a highly meandering course, generally southwest then west, then southwest, then west, then west by north, before heading south, joined by three tributaries including the Carey and Dolodrook rivers, and reaching its confluence with the Macalister River, north of Licola, in the Shire of Wellington. The river descends 820 metres (2,690 ft) over its 40-kilometre (25 mi) course.

== See also ==
- List of rivers of Australia § Victoria
