= Caledonia River =

Caledonia
- Location of the Caledonia River mouth in Victoria

Location
- Country: Australia
- State: Victoria
- Region: Victorian Alps (IBRA)
- Local government area: Shire of Wellington

Physical characteristics
- Source: Snowy Range, Great Dividing Range
  - location: below Minogues Lookout
  - coordinates: 37°14′40″S 146°41′33″E
  - elevation: 1,100 m (3,600 ft)
- Mouth: confluence with the Macalister River
  - location: near The Sisters
  - coordinates: 37°27′39″S 146°33′17″E
  - elevation: 354 m (1,161 ft)
- Length: 34 km (21 mi)

Basin features
- River system: West Gippsland catchment
- Tributaries
  - left: Caledonia River East Branch, Pipe Creek (Victoria), Dingo Creek (Victoria), Shaw Creek
  - right: Pine Creek (Victoria)
- National parks: East Caledonia Reference Area, Alpine NP

The Caledonia River is a perennial river of the West Gippsland catchment, in the Alpine region of the Australian state of Victoria. It is known for packrafting opportunities, especially after winter snowmelt or heavy spring rains, with grade 2–3 rapids. Access involves a 15 km (9.3 mi) hike through 4WD tracks from Licola, Victoria.

== Features and location ==
The Caledonia River rises below Minogues Lookout within the Snowy Range of the Great Dividing Range. The river flows generally south then south by west and then south, joined by the five tributaries including the Caledonia River East Branch (which is also joined by the Caledonia River Middle Branch), before reaching its confluence with the Macalister River, near The Sisters, in the Shire of Wellington. The river descends 743 metres (2,438 ft) over its 34-kilometre (21 mi) course.

== See also ==
- List of rivers of Australia § Victoria
