= Barkly River =

River in Victoria, Australia

Barkly Barkly River Mount Clear Branch, Barkly River East Branch, Barkly River West Branch
- Mouth of the Barkly River in Victoria
- Etymology: In honour of Sir Henry Barkly

Location
- Country: Australia
- State: Victoria
- Region: Victorian Alps (IBRA), West Gippsland
- Local government area: Shire of Mansfield

Physical characteristics
- Source: Great Dividing Range
- 2nd source: Barkly River East Branch
  - location: near The Nobs Spur
  - elevation: 1,370 m (4,490 ft)
- 3rd source: Barkly River West Branch
  - location: below Mount McDonald
  - elevation: 1,440 m (4,720 ft)
- Source confluence: East and West branches of the Barkly River
  - location: below Mount McKinty
  - coordinates: 37°22′56″S 146°27′49″E
  - elevation: 672 m (2,205 ft)
- Mouth: confluence with the Macalister River
  - location: south of Glencairn
  - coordinates: 37°33′35″S 146°34′53″E
  - elevation: 274 m (899 ft)
- Length: 30 km (19 mi)
- Discharge
  - location: mouth

Basin features
- River system: West Gippsland catchment
- Tributaries
  - left: Mountain Ash Creek, Sardine Creek
  - right: Mount Skene Creek, Glencairn Creek
- National park: Alpine NP, Lake Eildon NP

The Barkly River, a perennial river of the West Gippsland catchment, is located in the Alpine region of the Australian state of Victoria.

== Location and features ==
Formed by the confluence of the Barkly River East Branch that drains a state forestry area of the Great Dividing Range from an elevation of 1,370 metres (4,490 ft) AHD near The Nobs Spur; and the Barkly River West Branch that drains Mount McDonald within the Alpine National Park at an elevation of 1,440 metres (4,720 ft) AHD , the Barkly River rises in remote country east of the Mount Skene Scenic Reserve, below Mount McKinty. The river flows generally south by east, joined by four minor tributaries, before reaching its confluence with the Macalister River, south of the locale of Glencairn. From its highest elevation including the east and west branches of the river, the Barkly River descends 1,165 metres (3,822 ft) over its combined 42-kilometre (26 mi) course.

== Etymology ==
The river was named in honour of Sir Henry Barkly, the second Governor of Victoria, serving between 1856 and 1863.

== See also ==
- List of rivers of Australia § Victoria
