= Sale railway station, Victoria =

Railway station in Victoria, Australia

Sale
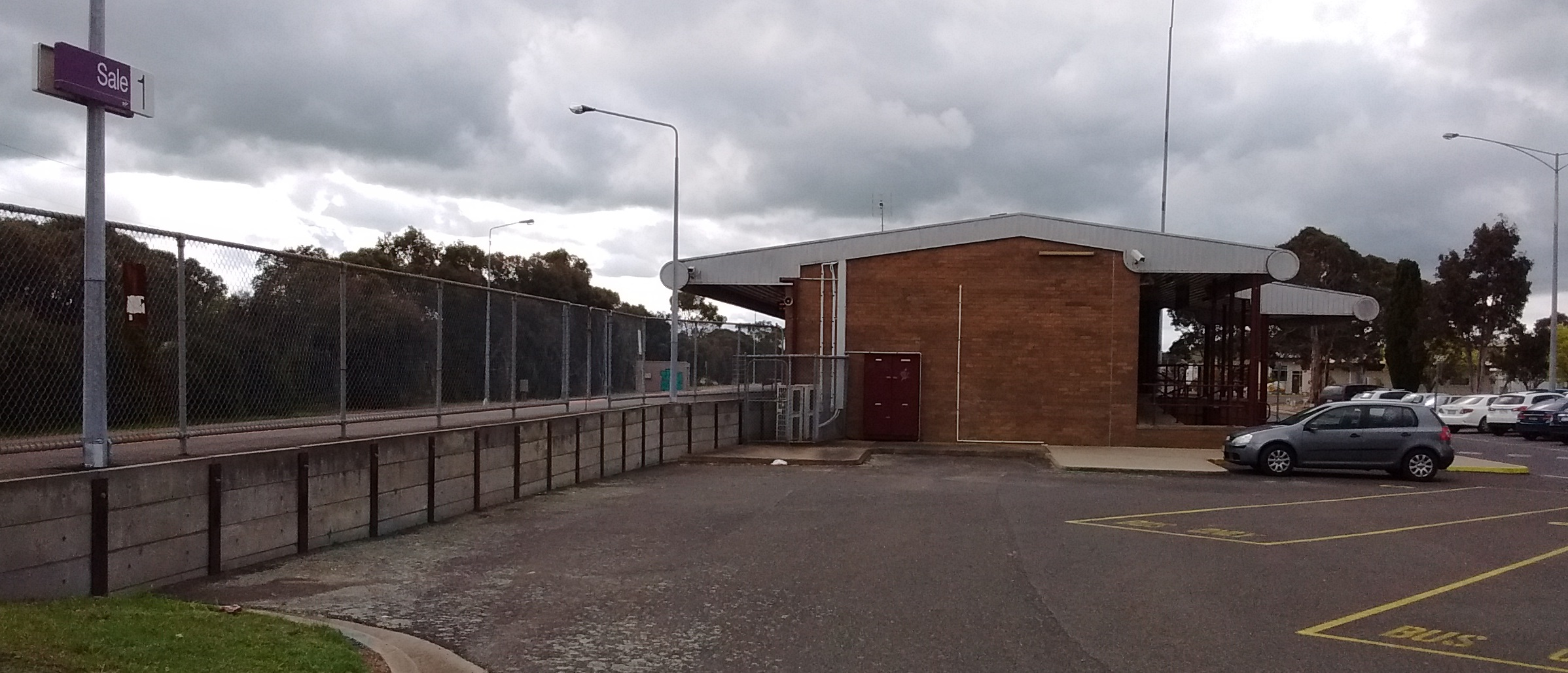
- Station carpark, entrance, platform and building, September 2015

General information
- Location: Pettit Drive, Sale, Victoria 3850; Shire of Wellington; Australia
- Coordinates: 38°06′12″S 147°03′14″E
- System: PTV regional rail station
- Owner: VicTrack
- Operator: V/Line
- Line: Gippsland
- Distance: 206.02 kilometres from Southern Cross
- Platforms: 1
- Tracks: 3
- Connections: Bus

Construction
- Structure type: At-grade
- Parking: Yes
- Accessible: Yes

Other information
- Status: Operational, staffed
- Station code: SAE
- Fare zone: Myki zone 16/17
- Website: Public Transport Victoria

History
- Opened: 1 June 1877; 149 years ago
- Rebuilt: 4 December 1983

Services
Preceding station	V/Line	Following station
Rosedale towards Southern Cross	Gippsland line	Stratford towards Bairnsdale
Location
- Location within Victoria

Sale railway station is a regional railway station on the Gippsland line, part of the Victorian railway network. It serves the town of the same name, in Victoria, Australia, and originally opened on 1 June 1877. The current station, on a different site, was opened in December 1983.

== History ==
The original Sale station was opened as the terminus of the line from Morwell, before the line was extended to Stratford Junction on 8 May 1888. The station was located in the town of Sale itself, east of Reeve Street. It was a dead-end terminus, with the line from Melbourne and the line to Stratford both entering from the west. Trains continuing along the line beyond Sale had to reverse at the station, or use the Traralgon-Maffra-Stratford line which bypassed Sale altogether. At the peak of operations, the yard had five roads, passenger and goods platforms, a goods shed, a 47-lever signal box, a cattle yard, an engine shed, a coal stage, and a turntable.

There was also a short branch line to the Sale Wharf, as well as a number of industrial sidings in the area, serving cool stores, fuel depots, a gas works, a flour mill, woollen mills, and stockyards.

After many years of discussions between the local council and rail authorities, the station was relocated to a site outside the town in 1983, on a new section of track which linked the Melbourne and Stratford lines, without the need to run in and out of the original station, which formed a rail triangle for a short period of time.

The goods facilities were first to be moved from the former station, which occurred on 28 September 1983, using part of the Sale – Stratford line as the base of the yard. The last train ran into the old station on 12 November 1983, with the new station officially opening on 4 December of that year. The last remnant of the railway line running into Sale was abolished in 1985, when parts of the former Port of Sale branch line were removed. Signals was not provided until 1987; that work included disconnecting the former Livestock and Felt and Textiles sidings between Raglan and Dawson streets were disconnected. The last, disconnected remnants of the Sale Wharf line were removed by May 1985. Station staff were withdrawn in 1993, but have since been restored.

In December 1995, rail traffic beyond Sale ceased, and Sale became the terminus for all trains on the line. Road coach services for passengers continued to Stratford, Bairnsdale, Lakes Entrance, Orbost, and further east, with some continuing into southern New South Wales. However, in mid-1999, log trains began operating from Bairnsdale again, and the passenger rail service to Bairnsdale was reinstated on 3 May 2004.

The site of the first Sale station is now the Gippsland Centre Shopping Centre, although the signal box, level crossing gates, and two semaphore signals are statically preserved in situ. To the west of the former station, the Sale industrial sidings remain in place but are unused, as are the goods sidings. The sidings across from the platform were regularly used to allow the Bairnsdale to Geelong log trains to cross passenger services, but log trains have ceased running.

== Platforms and services ==
Sale has one platform and is served by V/Line Bairnsdale line trains.

Sale platform arrangement
Platform	Line	Destination
1	Bairnsdale line	Southern Cross, Bairnsdale

== Transport links ==
Dysons operates two routes via Sale station, under contract to Public Transport Victoria:

- 4 : to Sale (Gippsland Centre Shopping Centre)
- 7 : Sale – Loch Sport

== Gallery ==
Southbound view, with a 707 Operations heritage special stabled in the siding, June 2018

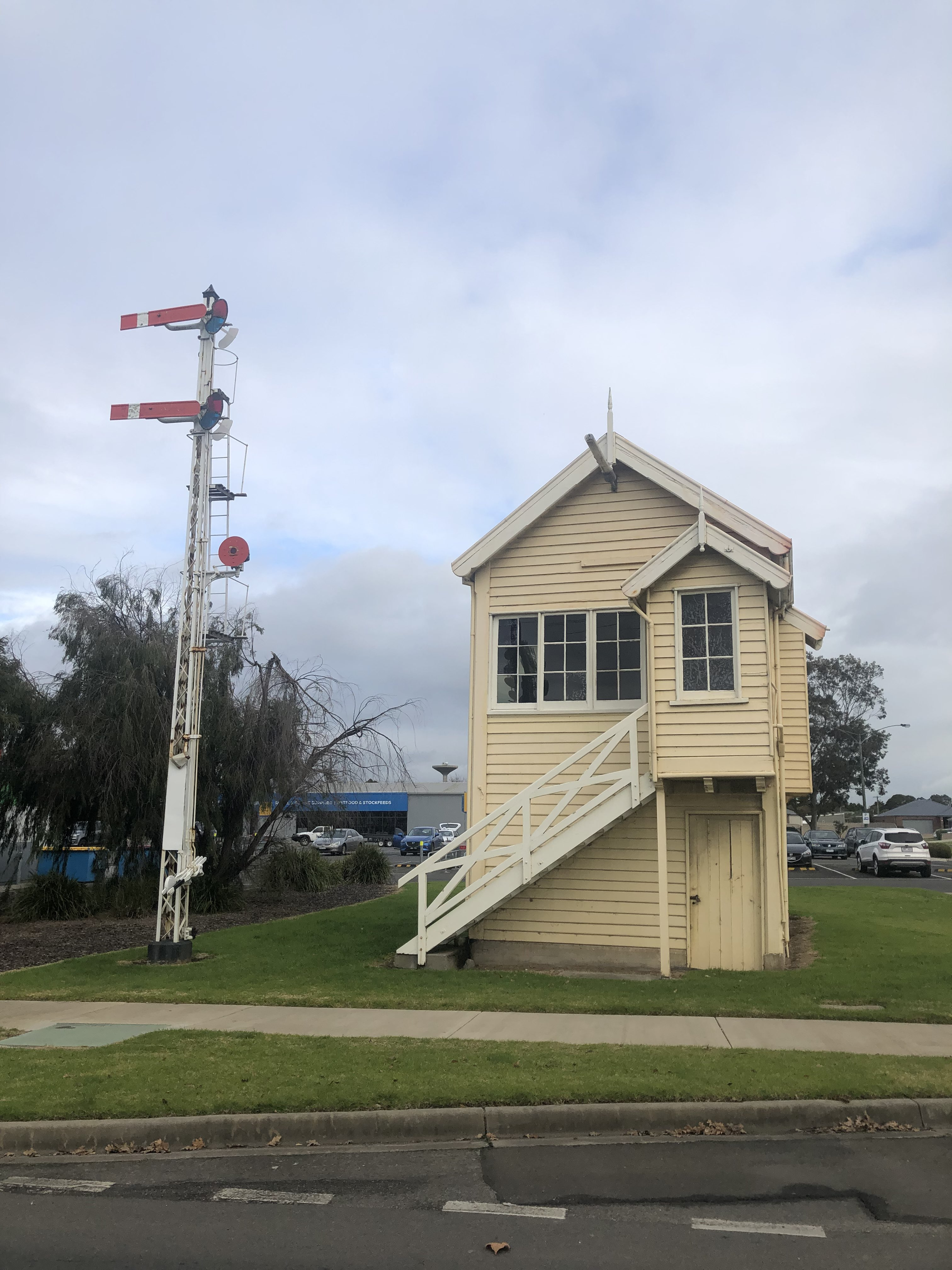
Disused signal box and semaphore signals, preserved in situ, June 2021
