= Macalister River =

Macalister
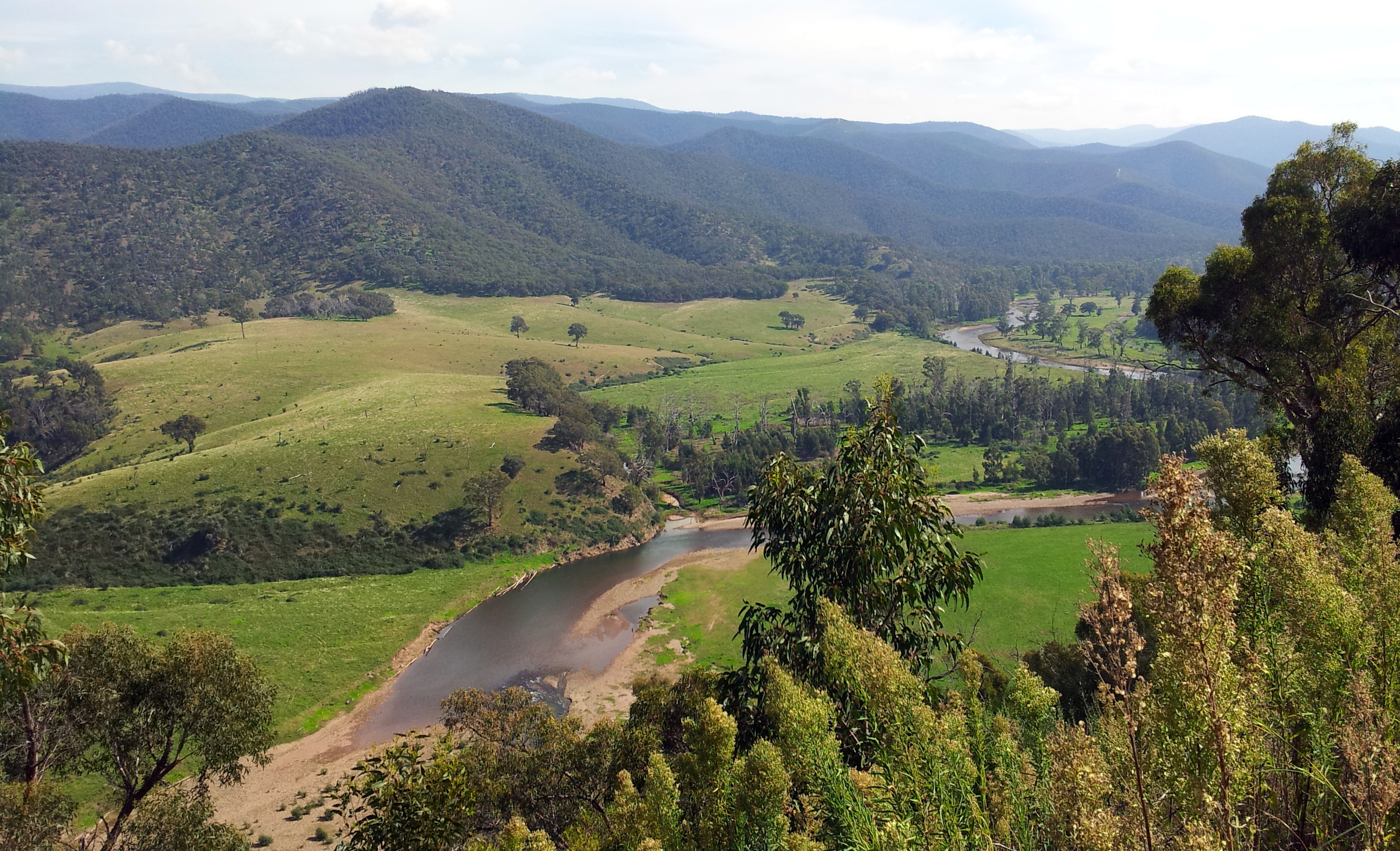

- Mouth of the Macalister River in Victoria
- Etymology: Captain Lachlan Macalister
- Native name: Wirnwirndook'yeerung (Kurnai)

Location
- Country: Australia
- State: Victoria
- Region: Victorian Alps (IBRA), South East Coastal Plain (IBRA), West Gippsland
- Local government area: Shire of Wellington
- Settlements: Maffra

Physical characteristics
- Source: Great Dividing Range
  - location: below Mount Howitt
  - coordinates: 37°10′18″S 146°39′37″E
  - elevation: 1,550 m (5,090 ft)
- Mouth: confluence with the Thomson River
  - location: south of Maffra
  - coordinates: 38°2′18″S 146°58′52″E
  - elevation: 14 m (46 ft)
- Length: 177 km (110 mi)
- Discharge
  - location: mouth

Basin features
- River system: West Gippsland catchment
- Tributaries
  - left: Caledonia River, Wellington River, Stony Creek 2 (Macalister River, Victoria), Main Northern Channel
  - right: Peters Creek (Victoria), Coleman Creek (Victoria), Grimme Creek, Barkly River, Target Creek, Serpentine Creek, Mount Useful Creek, Cheyne Creek, Stony Creek 1 (Macalister River, Victoria), Glenmaggie Creek, Main Serpentine Drain
- National park: Alpine NP, Avon Wilderness Park

The Macalister River, a perennial river of the West Gippsland catchment, is located in the Alpine and Gippsland regions of the Australian state of Victoria.

== Location and features ==
The Macalister River rises below Mount Howitt, part of the Great Dividing Range in the southern portion of the Alpine National Park; and flows generally south by east in a highly meandering course. The river is joined by fifteen tributaries including the Caledonia, Wellington, and Barkly rivers, impounded by the Glenmaggie Dam that creates Lake Glenmaggie, before reaching its confluence with the Thomson River, south of Maffra. The river descends 1,530 metres (5,020 ft) over its 177-kilometre (110 mi) course. The fertile flats and valley floor of the Macalister River support agriculture around the town of Licola.

== Etymology ==
In the Aboriginal Braiakaulung language the river was named Wirnwirndook'yeerun, meaning the "song of some bird", purportedly an emu wren.

The river was later named the Macalister River by explorer Angus McMillan, after his employer, Captain Lachlan Macalister.

== See also ==
- List of rivers of Australia § Victoria
