= Bairnsdale railway station =

Railway station in Victoria, Australia

Bairnsdale
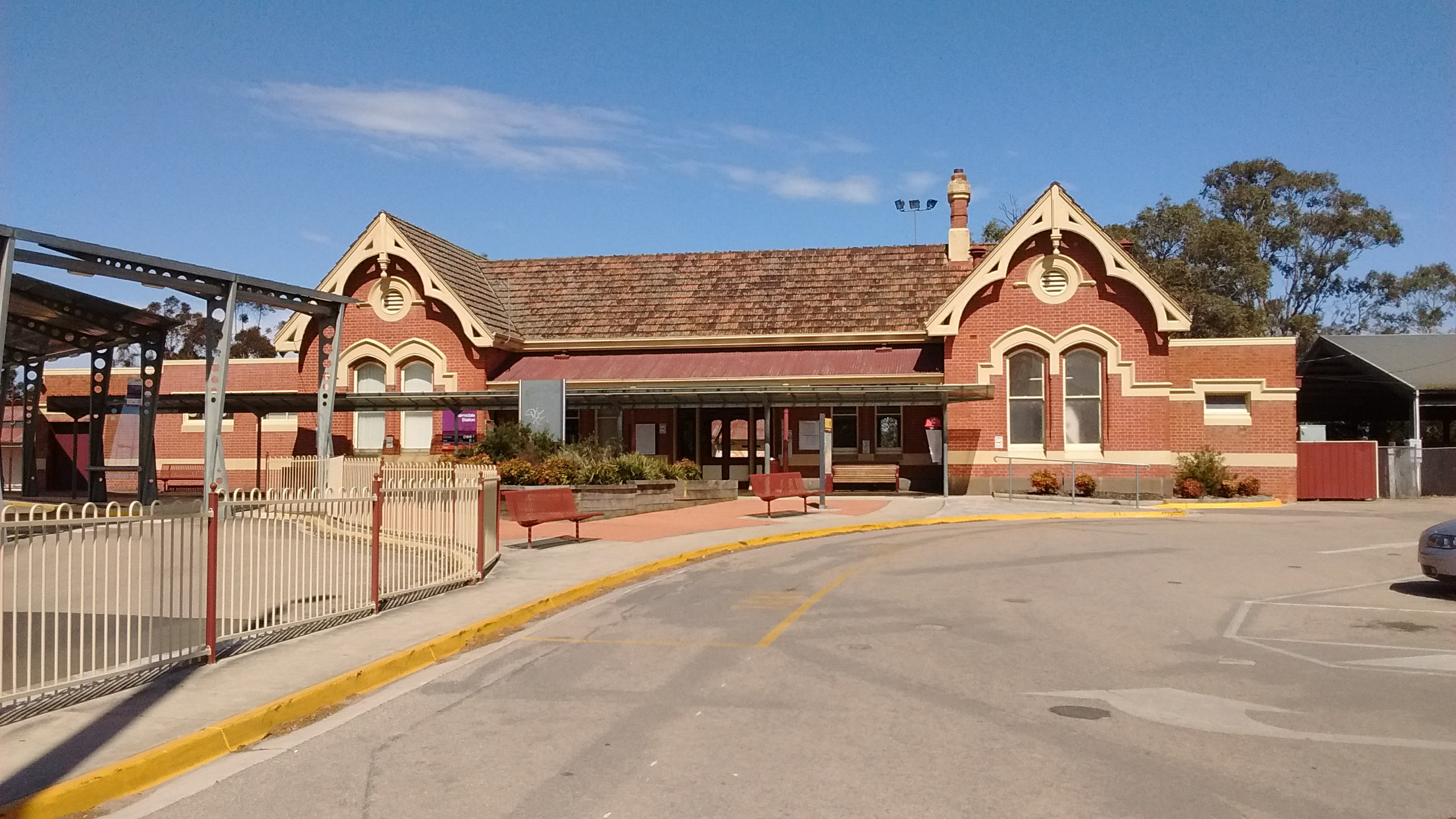
- Station entrance and building, September 2017

General information
- Location: Macleod Street, Bairnsdale, Victoria 3875; Shire of East Gippsland; Australia
- Coordinates: 37°49′44″S 147°37′39″E
- System: PTV regional rail station
- Owner: VicTrack
- Operator: V/Line
- Line: Gippsland
- Distance: 274.85 kilometres from Southern Cross
- Platforms: 1
- Tracks: 3
- Connections: Bus; Coach

Construction
- Structure type: At-grade
- Parking: Yes
- Accessible: Yes

Other information
- Status: Operational, staffed
- Station code: BDE
- Fare zone: Myki zone 23
- Website: Public Transport Victoria

History
- Opened: 8 May 1888; 138 years ago
- Closed: August 1993 for an extended period
- Rebuilt: Reopened 3 May 2004

Services
Preceding station	V/Line	Following station
Stratford towards Southern Cross	Gippsland line	Terminus
Former service
Preceding station	V/Line	Following station
Stratford towards Spencer Street	Gippsland line	Nicholson towards Orbost
Location
- Location within Victoria

Bairnsdale railway station is a regional railway station and the terminus of the Gippsland line, part of the Victorian railway network. It serves the city of Bairnsdale, in Victoria, Australia. Bairnsdale station is a ground level premium station, featuring one side platform. It opened on 8 May 1888, with the current station provided in 2004. It initially closed in August 1993, then reopened on 3 May 2004.

Until 1987, the line continued to Orbost. This has been redeveloped as the East Gippsland Rail Trail, a shared bicycle, walking, and horse-riding track.

== History ==
The railway line opened to Bairnsdale in 1888, and from 1916, continued through to Orbost, until this section was closed in 1987. The passenger service to the town was named The Gippslander in 1954, but services were suspended beyond Sale in August 1993.

Following the cessation of log trains in December 1995, the line between Sale and Bairnsdale was closed, until it was partially reopened for log trains in mid-1999. Following major infrastructure repairs, the passenger service was restored on 3 May 2004, as part of the Linking Victoria program. Until mid-2009, a five-day-a-week freight train hauling logs from Bairnsdale to North Geelong Yard operated from a siding approximately 2.5 km west of the station.

Until their demolition, Hillside, Lindenow, Fernbank and Munro stations were located between Bairnsdale and Stratford stations.

=== Location ===
Bairnsdale station is 14 metres (46 ft) above sea level, and 275 kilometres (171 mi) from Melbourne.

== Platforms and services ==
Bairnsdale has one platform. It is serviced by V/Line Bairnsdale line services.

Bairnsdale platform arrangement
Platform	Line	Destination
1	Bairnsdale line	Southern Cross

== Transport links ==
V/Line operates road coach services via Bairnsdale station to:

- Paynesville
- Marlo
- Batemans Bay
- Canberra

== Gallery ==
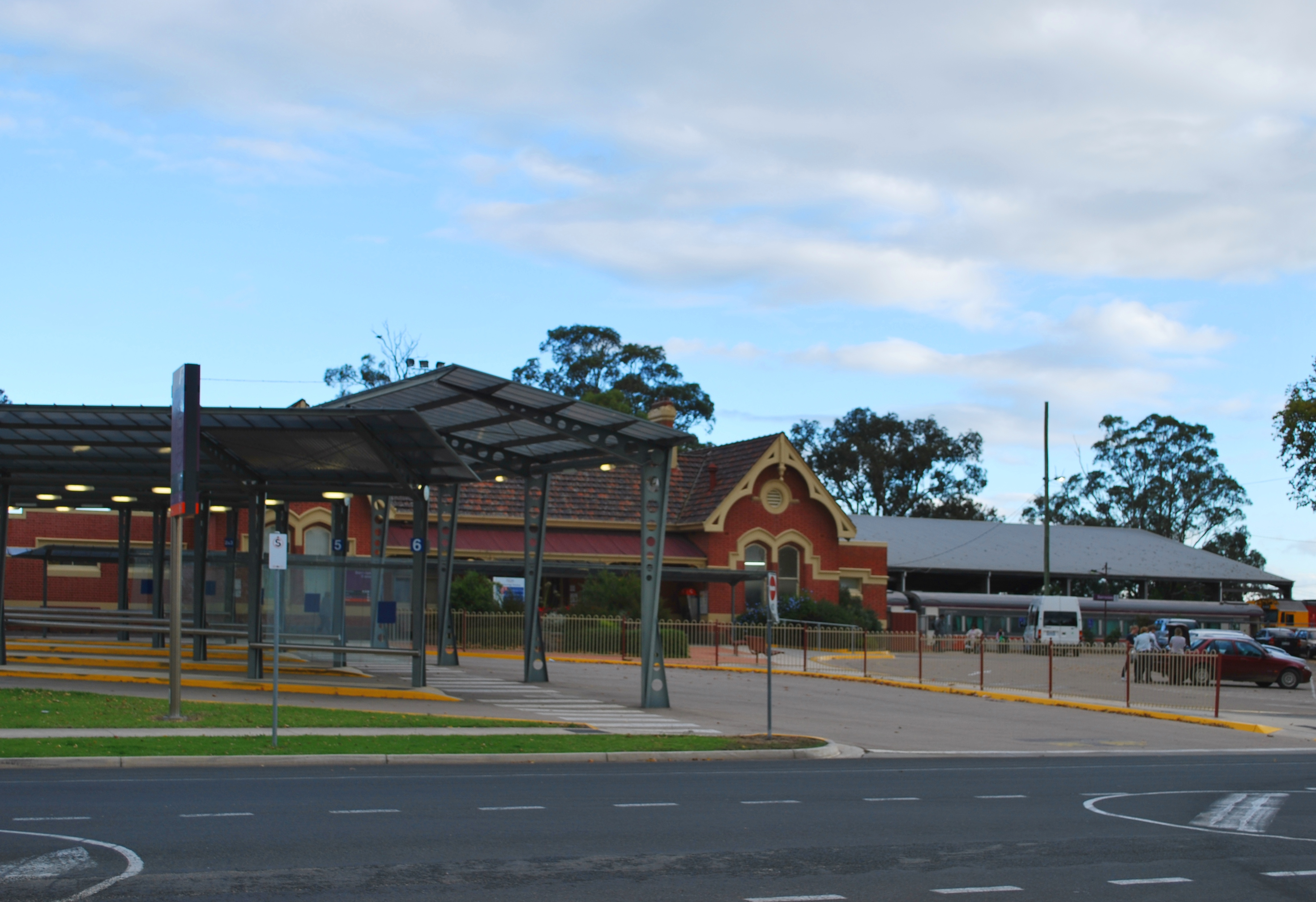
Station building and bus interchange, April 2011

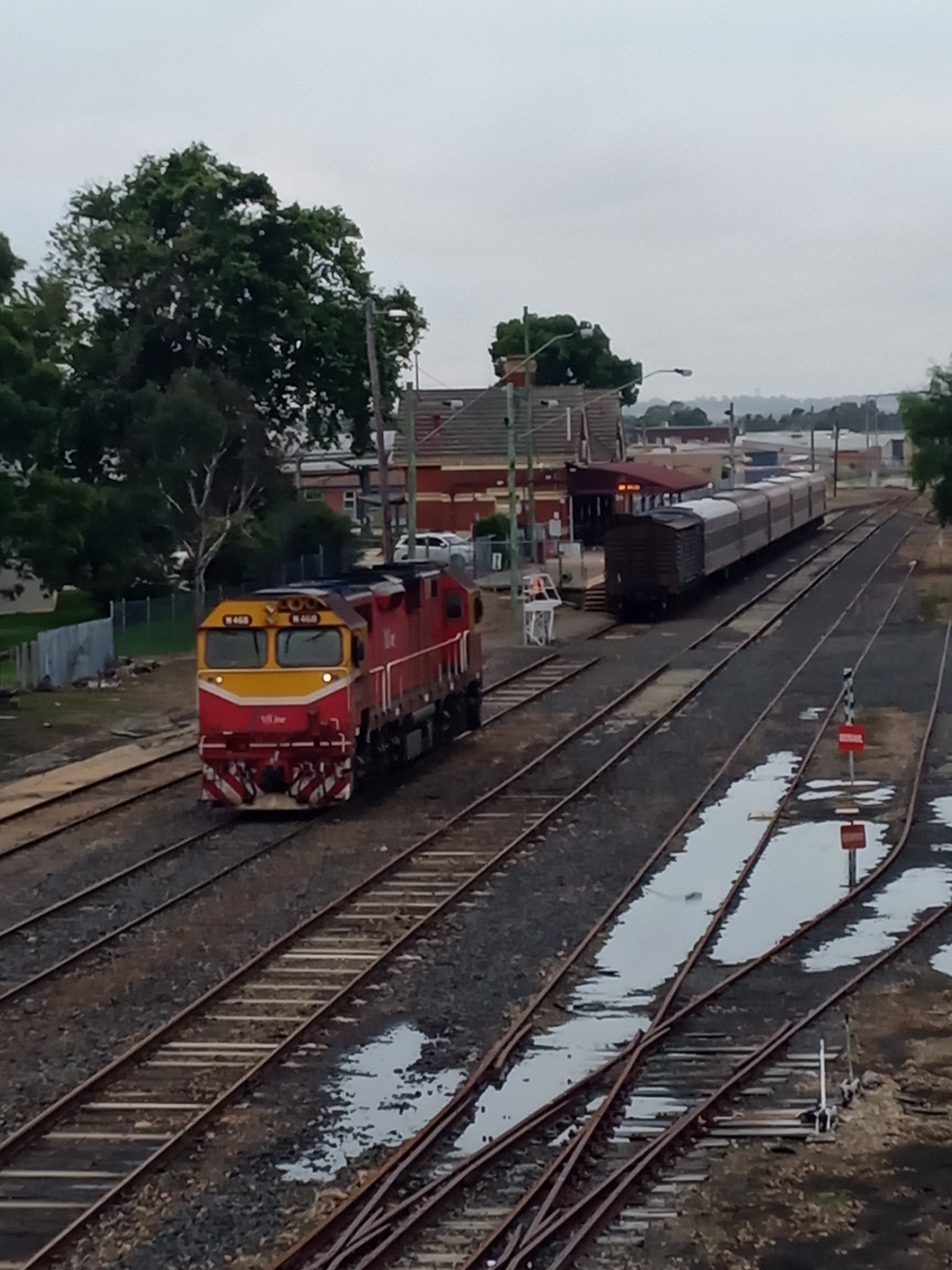
N468 running around an N set, January 2022

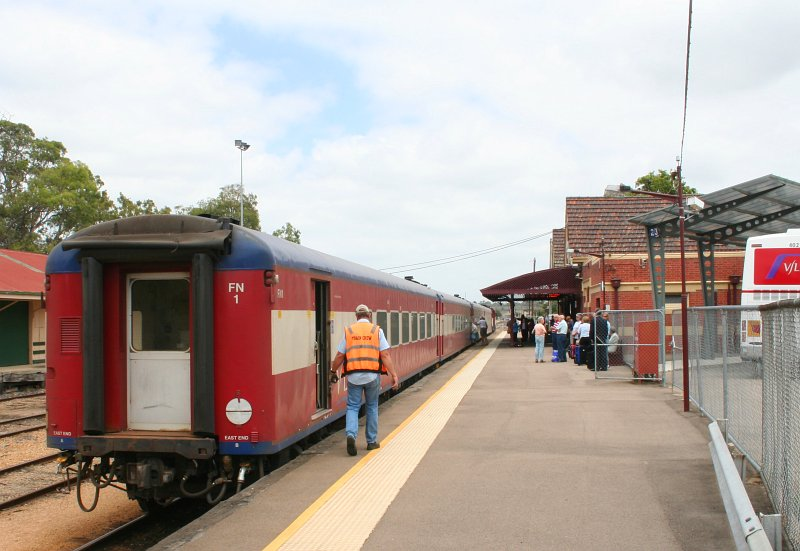
A view along platform 1 with an N set in the platform, April 2008

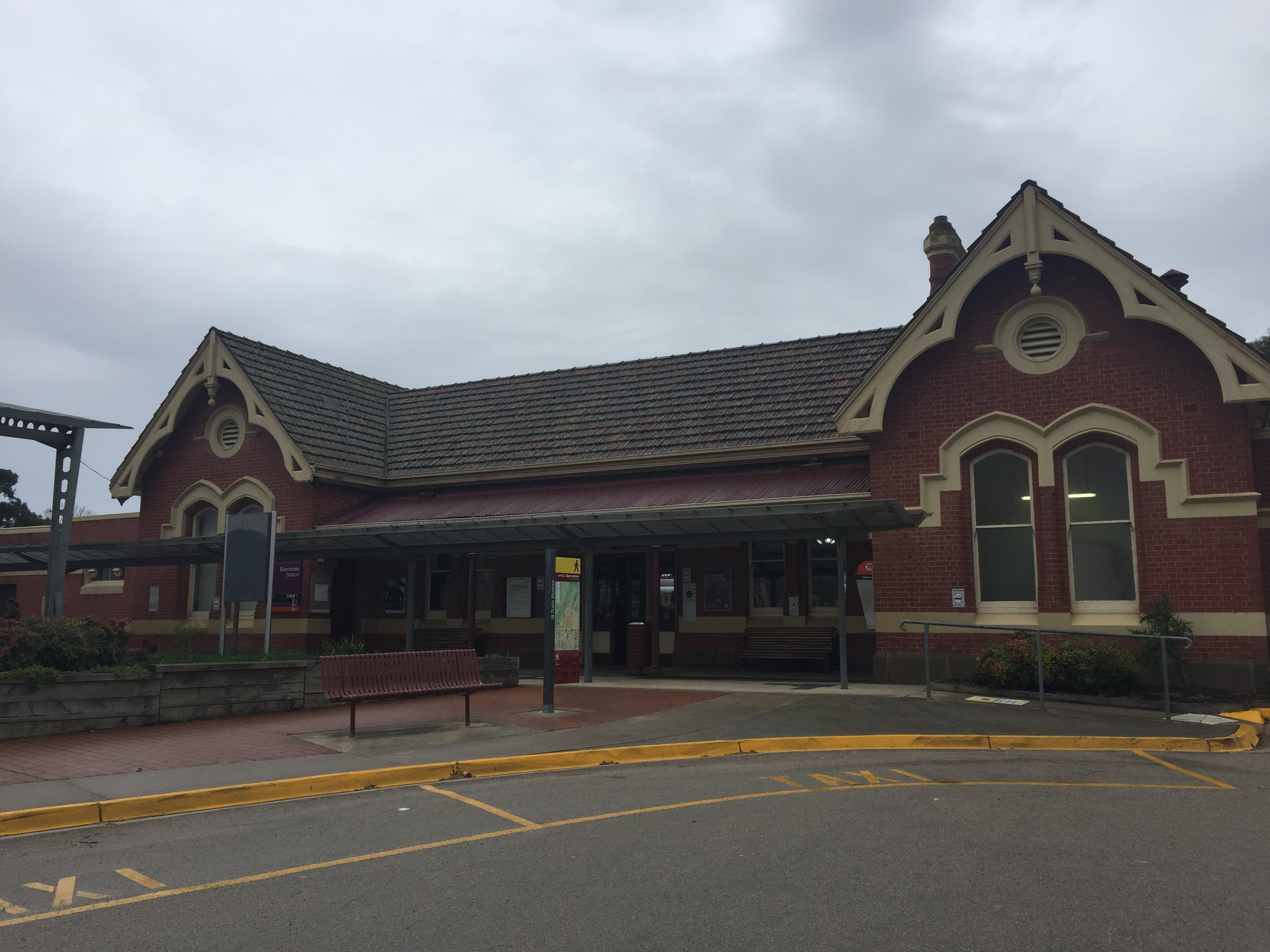
A view of the station building, April 2022
