= Fernbank railway station =

Former railway station in Victoria, Australia

Coordinates: 37°52′15″S 147°19′27″E

Fernbank

General information
- Line: Bairnsdale
- Platforms: 2
- Tracks: 1

Other information
- Status: Closed

History
- Opened: 1888
- Closed: 1981

Services
Preceding station	V/Line	Following station
Munro towards Southern Cross	Bairnsdale line	Lindenow towards Bairnsdale
List of closed railway stations in Victoria
Location

Fernbank is a closed station in the town of Fernbank, on the Bairnsdale railway line railway line, in Victoria, Australia. The station was one of 35 closed to passenger traffic on 4 October 1981, as part of the New Deal timetable for country passengers.

It was disestablished as a Staff station on 1 December 1986, with the crossing loop spiked out of service. The crossing loop remains, along with a disused goods platform.
