= Avon River (Gippsland, Victoria) =

River in the Gippsland region of Victoria, Australia

Avon
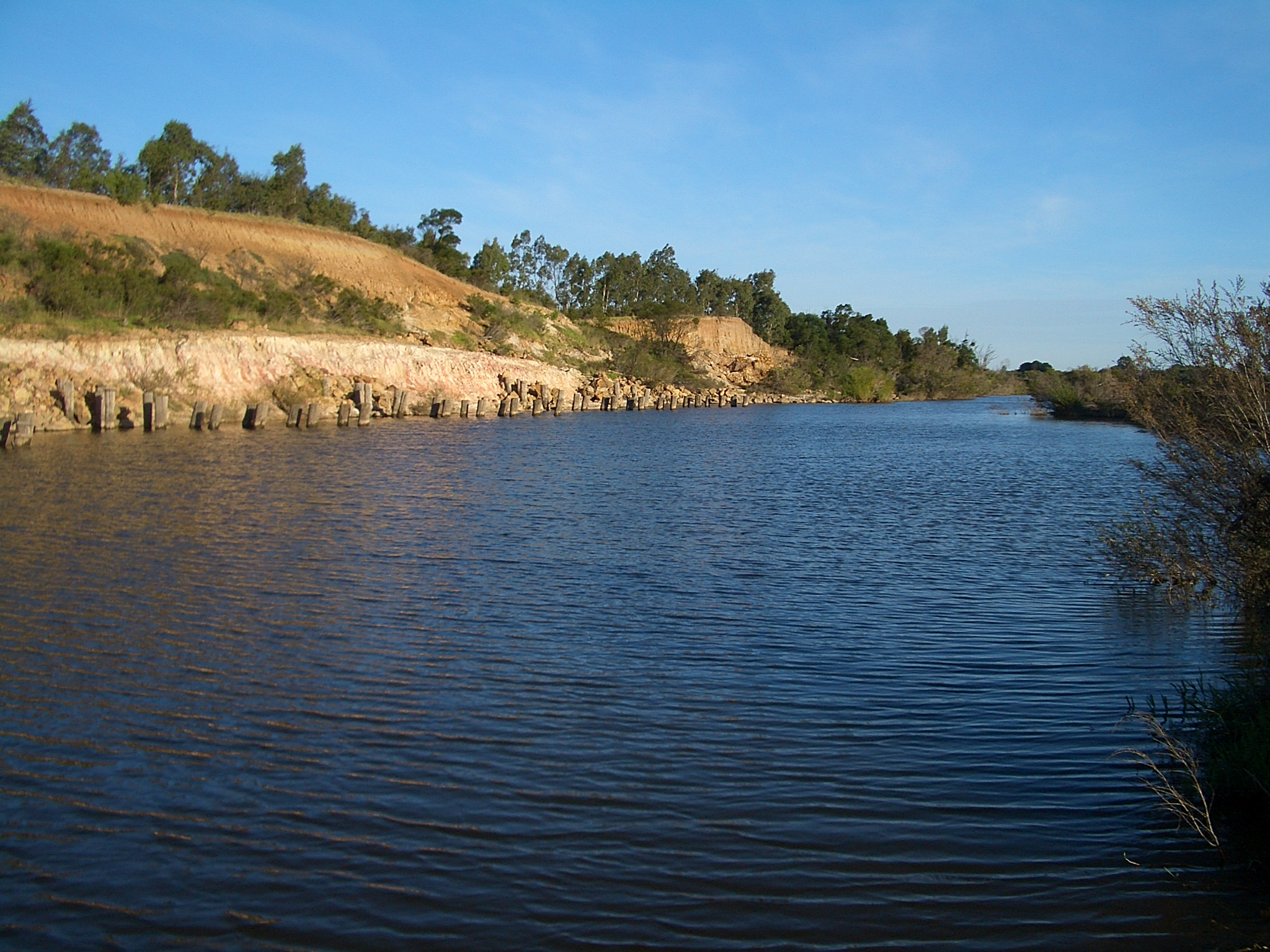
- Avon River near Stratford, 2008

- Location of the Avon River mouth in Victoria
- Etymology: Originally called the Avoca; named the Avon by Angus McMillan
- Native name: Dooyeedang (Kurnai); Adige (Kurnai)

Location
- Country: Australia
- State: Victoria
- Region: South East Corner (IBRA), South East Coastal Plain (IBRA), West Gippsland
- Local government area: Wellington

Physical characteristics
- Source: Mount Wellington, Great Dividing Range
  - location: Miler Spur, Avon Wilderness Park
  - coordinates: 37°30′38″S 146°51′44″E
  - elevation: 664 m (2,178 ft)
- Mouth: Lake Wellington
  - location: east of Sale; southeast of Stratford
  - coordinates: 38°2′57″S 147°16′7″E
  - elevation: 0 m (0 ft)
- Length: 122 km (76 mi)

Basin features
- River system: West Gippsland catchment
- Tributaries
  - left: Turton River, Valencia Creek, Freestone Creek, Blackall Creek, Perry River
  - right: Mount Hump Creek, McColl Creek, Ben Cruachan Creek, Navigation Creek, Nuntin Creek
- National park: Avon Wilderness Park

The Avon River is a perennial river of the West Gippsland catchment, in the West Gippsland region, of the Australian state of Victoria. The Avon, forms an important part of the Latrobe sub-catchment, draining the south eastern slopes of the Great Dividing Range, to form the Gippsland Lakes.

== Location and features ==
The Avon River rises on the south eastern slopes of Mount Wellington, below Miller Spur, part of the Great Dividing Range within the Avon Wilderness Park. The rivers flows in a highly meandering course generally south, then east, then south by southeast, joined by ten tributaries including the Turton River and the Perry River, before reaching its mouth to form Lake Wellington east of Sale and southeast of Stratford. Within Lake Wellington, the Avon forms its confluence with the Latrobe River, empties into Bass Strait via the Mitchell River south of Lakes Entrance. The river descends 664 metres (2,178 ft) over its 122-kilometre (76 mi) course.

The upper reaches are contained in the rugged, heavily forested and largely inaccessible, Avon Wilderness Park. The river passes through forested hillsides, then cleared agricultural land. Around Stratford the river has dug a wide channel up to 500 metres (1,600 ft) across, composed mainly of sand banks and pebble banks. The river then forms a boundary for the Macallister Irrigation District, with Nuntin Creek joining 10 kilometres (6.2 mi) downstream of Stratford contributing a large amount of irrigation drainage to the river.

Considerable demand is placed on the Latrobe and Thomson Rivers for supply of Melbourne's water, industrial use in Australia's largest pulp and paper mill and the power industry in the Latrobe Valley, and for irrigation. The Avon escapes any major impoundment or diversion.

The river was important to the indigenous Gunai/Kurnai people, highlighted by Knob Reserve, 3 kilometres (1.9 mi) south of Stratford, being part of the Gunai/Kurnai Bataluk Cultural Trail. The trail highlights the places of cultural significance to the first inhabitants across East Gippsland.

== Etymology ==
In the Brataualung language, two names have been recorded for the river, Dooyeedang, with no defined meaning; and Kutbuntaura-wurk, Kurbuntaura referring to a section of the Brataua clan meaning "fire carriers" who lived on the upper Avon River, and wurk, meaning "land" or "country". Kutbuntaura-wurk may therefore be considered a description: 'the land of the Kutbuntaura'.

At one point named the Avoca River by Thomas Mitchell, the river was named the Avon by Angus McMillan in circa 1840.

== See also ==
- List of rivers of Victoria
