= Valencia Creek, Victoria =

Valencia Creek
- Town
- Coordinates: 37°50′S 146°59′E
- Country: Australia
- State: Victoria
- LGA: Shire of Wellington
- Location: 243 km (151 mi) E of Melbourne; 47 km (29 mi) N of Sale; 27 km (17 mi) N of Maffra; 14 km (8.7 mi) NE of Briagolong

Government
  - State electorate: Gippsland East
  - Federal division: Gippsland

Area
  - Total: 79.7 km^{2} (30.8 sq mi)

Population
  - Total: 187 (2021 census)
  - Density: 2.346/km^{2} (6.077/sq mi)
- Postcode: 3860
- Mean max temp: 25.6 °C (78.1 °F)
- Mean min temp: 5.7 °C (42.3 °F)

Valencia Creek is a locality in East Gippsland, Victoria, Australia on the Valencia Creek-Briagolong Road, north of Maffra in the Shire of Wellington. The junction of Valencia Creek and the Avon River are a short distance upstream. The foothills of the Great Dividing Range start immediately north of Valencia Creek, while dairy farms lie to the south along the Avon River flats to Boisdale.

Valencia Creek Post Office opened on 23 July 1895, closed next year, reopened in 1900 and closed again in 1974.

The town centre comprises a fire station, hall and church (no longer doing services), and the former Post office. The local school was consolidated with a number of other surrounding schools to form Boisdale Consolidated School #6207.
