= Lindenow railway station =

Former railway station in Victoria, Australia

Coordinates: 37°49′30″S 147°25′59″E

Lindenow

General information
- Line: Bairnsdale
- Platforms: 2
- Tracks: 1

Other information
- Status: Closed

History
- Opened: 1888
- Closed: 4 October 1981

Services
Preceding station	V/Line	Following station
Fernbank towards Southern Cross	Bairnsdale line	Hillside towards Bairnsdale
List of closed railway stations in Victoria
Location

Lindenow was a former railway station located in the town of Lindenow South, on the Bairnsdale railway line railway line in Victoria, Australia. The station was one of 35 closed to passenger traffic on 4 October 1981 as part of the New Deal timetable for country passengers. A disused passenger platform was located at the station but was removed in mid 2015, while the goods siding and cattle yards had been removed in the early 1980s.
