= Mount Wellington (Victoria) =

Mountain in Victoria, Australia

- Location within Victoria

Highest point
- Elevation: 1,634 metres (5,361 ft) AHD
- Coordinates: 37°30′29″S 146°50′47″E

Geography
- Location: Victoria, Australia
- Parent range: Great Dividing Range

Mount Wellington is a mountain located to the north-east of Licola in Victoria, Australia.

== History ==
Mount Wellington was named by Angus McMillan, who was also the first European to ascend the mountain.

In November 1854, Victorian Government Botanist Ferdinand von Mueller climbed the mountain on the third of his three expeditions to the Victorian Alps, collecting many plants, including alpine wattle, dwarf buttercup and lilac berry.

== Location ==
It is on the border of the Alpine National Park and Avon Wilderness Park. The Avon River rises on its south-eastern slopes.

The mountain is accessible via a seasonally-open four-wheel drive track that traverses the ridge line. Features along the track include Millers Hut (originally built in 1916), Taylors Lookout, The Sentinels, and Gable End. To the near west lies Lake Tali Karng.

== See also ==
- List of mountains in Australia § Victoria
