= Hillside railway station, Victoria =

Former railway station in Victoria, Australia

Coordinates: 37°49′59″S 147°29′53″E

Hillside

General information
- Line: Gippsland
- Platforms: 1
- Tracks: 2

Other information
- Status: Closed

History
- Opened: 1 October 1888
- Closed: 1 May 1972

Services
| Preceding station | V/Line | Following station |
|---|---|---|
| Lindenow towards Southern Cross | Bairnsdale line | Bairnsdale Terminus |
List of closed railway stations in Victoria
Location

Hillside is a closed railway station located in the East Gippsland town of Hillside, on the Gippsland line in Victoria, Australia.

Opening on 1 October 1888 as Quiggan's Siding, it was closed to passengers on 1 May 1972. By 11 February 1975, the passenger platform was removed. It was located 262 km from Southern Cross station.

Although the station has been demolished, a siding is located at the station, which was last used by Freight Australia for log trains prior to the reopening of the line to Bairnsdale. It also served for many years, with most of this infrastructure remaining, as a siding where bitumen was transported via rail for storage and on-distribution for road surfacing works in eastern Victoria.
