= Avon Wilderness Park =

Alpine protected area in Victoria, Australia

- IUCN category Ib (wilderness area)
- Location within Victoria
- Location: Victoria
- Nearest city: Licola
- Coordinates: 37°36′45″S 146°50′34″E
- Area: 395.58 km^{2} (152.73 sq mi)
- Established: 27 November 1987
- Governing body: Parks Victoria
- Website: http://parkweb.vic.gov.au/explore/parks/avon-wilderness-park

The Avon Wilderness Park is a protected area in the southern part of the Victorian Alps, located in Australia.

== Location and features ==
The reserve is contiguous with the southern border of the Alpine National Park and was declared in 1987. It protects 39,650 hectares (98,000 acres) of mountain ash and sub-alpine woodlands. Although there are no walking or vehicle tracks inside the park, hiking is possible with the use of topographic maps. The nearest point of access is via Licola. Along with Big Desert Wilderness Park and Wabba Wilderness Park, it is one of three such parks in Victoria, managed by Parks Victoria.

On 7 November 2008, the park was added to the Australian National Heritage List as one of 11 areas constituting the Australian Alps National Parks and Reserves.
