= Victorian Railways S type carriage =

Class of passenger carriage used in Australia

S type carriage
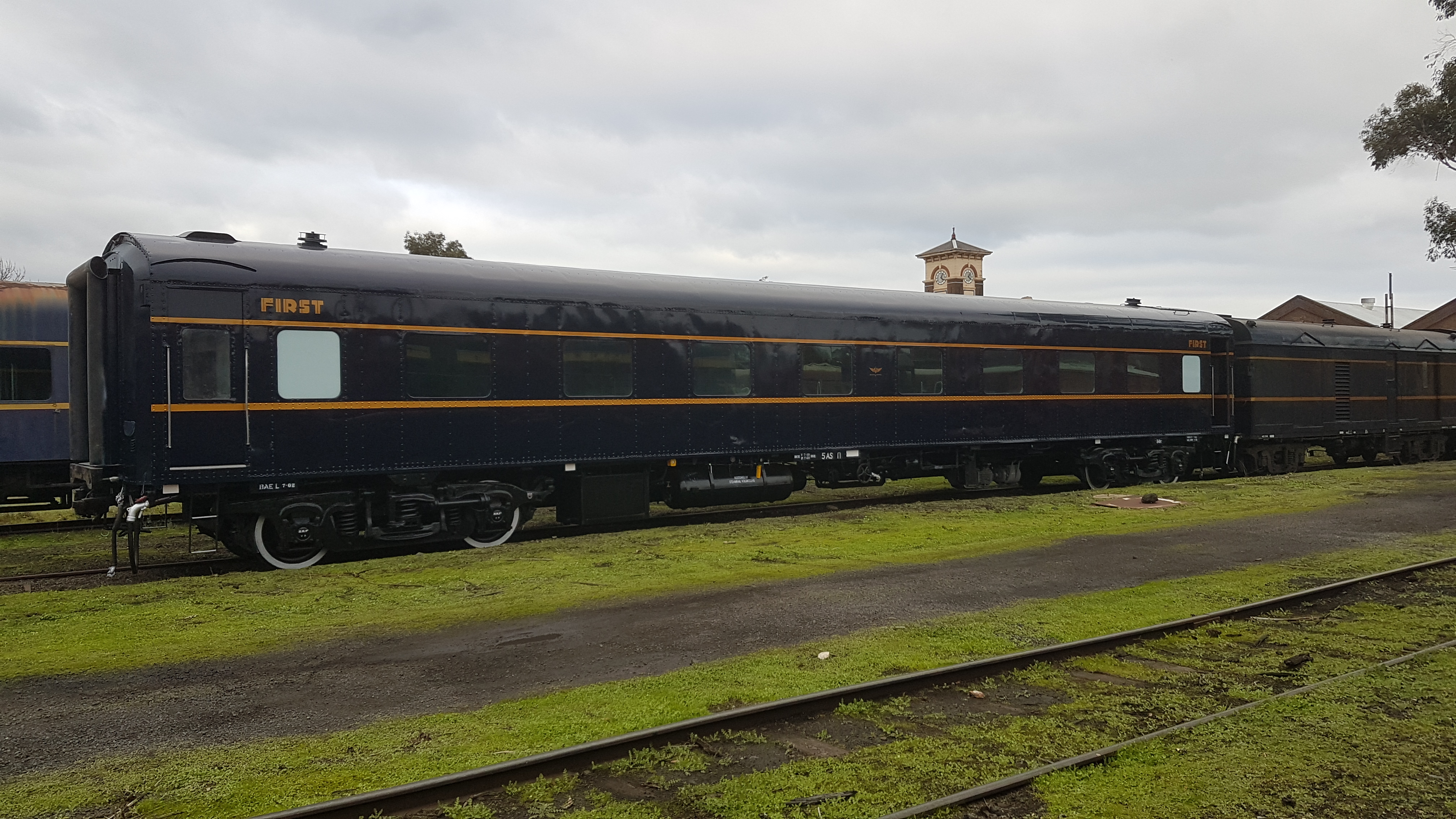
- 5AS, as preserved by Steamrail Victoria

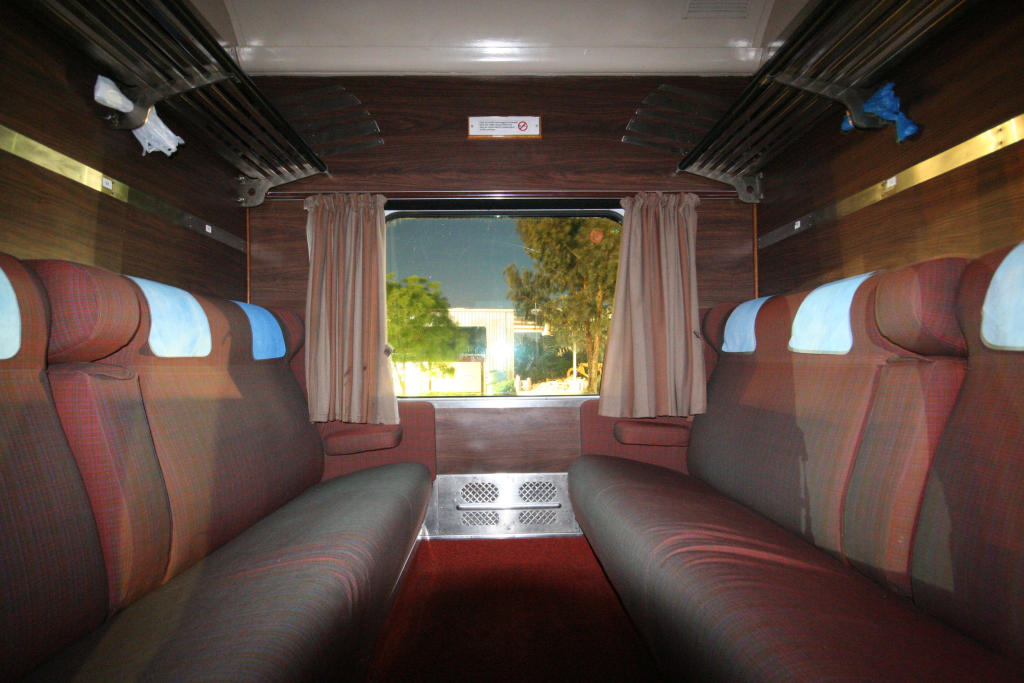
- Interior of a BS car compartment
- Manufacturer: Victorian Railways
- Built at: Newport Workshops
- Family name: S type carriage
- Replaced: E type carriage
- Constructed: 1937–1956
- Entered service: 1937–2010 (1990s to present day with heritage operators)
- Refurbished: 1980s
- Scrapped: 1972 (7AS); 1984 (2VHN ex 1DS/2CS)
- Operators: Victorian Railways, V/Line, West Coast Railway

Specifications
- Car body construction: 71 ft 6 in (21.79 m) for passenger cars; 59 feet 8 inches (18.19 m) for vans; 72 feet 1 1/4 inches (21.98 m) for State Car No. 5
- Car length: 74 ft 8 in (22.76 m) for passenger cars; 56 feet 10 inches (17.32 m) for vans;
- Width: 9 ft 9 in (2.97 m) (all); 10 ft 1 11/16 in (3.09 m) over handrails (broad gauge); 10 ft 5/8 in (3.06 m) over handrails (standard gauge); 10 ft 2 in (3.10 m) over tail-lights (Norman)
- Height: 13 ft 6 11/16 in (4.13 m) for all except four Buffet cars; 13 ft 2 13/16 in (4.03 m) for buffet cars
- Articulated sections: Rubber corridor connectors
- Wheel diameter: 3 ft 0 in (0.91 m)
- Wheelbase: 8 ft 0 in (2.44 m)
- Maximum speed: 70 mph (113 km/h)
- Power supply: Head-end power, previously axle driven generator
- Bogies: 53 ft (16.15 m) centres, all except vans 38 ft (11.58 m) centres for vans
- Braking system: Westinghouse air brake
- Coupling system: Automatic
- Headlight type: Incandescent, later fluorescent
- Track gauge: 5 ft 3 in (1,600 mm), have operated on 4 ft 8 1/2 in (1,435 mm) standard gauge

The S type carriages are a corridor-type passenger carriage used on the railways of Victoria, Australia. The first carriages were constructed by the Victorian Railways in 1937 for use on the Spirit of Progress, with additional carriages built for other trains until the mid-1950s.

Introduced by Victorian Railways Chairman of Commissioners Harold Clapp for the Spirit of Progress service between Melbourne and Albury, the carriages lasted through many decades of regular service, with more than one operator.

Two major variants of the S-type carriage were constructed: AS first-class cars with 3+3 seating in each compartment, and BS second-class cars with 4+4 seating. A handful of other cars were constructed for various specialist purposes. A number of conversions were carried out in later years, with the addition of beds to some to create sleeping cars, and buffet modules fitted to others to provide on-board catering facilities. The BRS buffet cars were the most recent conversion, made as part of the New Deal reforms on Victorian regional railways in the early 1980s.

The cars saw little use after the early 1990s, due to the introduction of the Sprinter railcars, and most were disposed of. A number were sold to West Coast Railway (WCR), with others being allocated to preservation groups such as Steamrail Victoria, 707 Operations and the Seymour Railway Heritage Centre. After the demise of WCR, some of their cars were converted to crew cars for interstate trains, while others were on-sold to the same preservation groups listed above. A handful of sitting carriages were retained by V/Line to bolster their normal fleet.

The five BS cars owned by V/Line were retired in July 2006, almost 69 years after their introduction. However, owing to a boom in patronage, and the Kerang rail accident, from late September 2007 they were re-introduced to service as a dedicated train set on the Geelong line, to replace set N7. That set was finally withdrawn from service on 9 August 2010, running the 7:47am service from South Geelong to Southern Cross. All of V/Line's remaining S-type carriages have since been sold or allocated to preservation groups.

== Development and design ==
When the Spirit of Progress concept was being developed as a replacement for the Sydney Limited, it was made known that the Victorian Railways Chairman of Commissioners, Harold Clapp, wanted the train to be a rival to the greatest trains in the world – modern, smooth, streamlined and with an air of efficiency. To achieve this, it was decided that a new all-steel train would be constructed from scratch, using the most recent developments in rollingstock design and the most exquisite creature comforts.

Clapp had visited the United States in 1934–35, to learn about the latest developments in the field. Included were visits to the American Car and Foundry, Missouri, as well as a sampling of the services provided by the Baltimore and Ohio Railroad's trains, the Royal Blue and Abraham Lincoln. Both of these trains were of metal construction, the former with CorTen steel (developed by the United States Steel Corporation) and the latter with aluminium. Both trains were hauled by steam locomotives at the time of the visit, and both were of much smaller dimensions than those typically provided on American trains – but closer to the normal Australian railways loading gauge.

Based on the findings of his visit, Clapp insisted that the new train would have the best possible insulation (from track sound and vibrations, as well as extremes of temperature), air-conditioning, and yet to be of similar weight and capacity of the then-standard E carriage fleet. Indeed, advertising at the time declared that the materials selected "reduced train noises to an almost imperceptible minimum".

After testing, the design of the Royal Blue, with riveted CorTen steel, was selected as the basis for the new carriages and train. With the new design, it was found that a Spirit of Progress carriage of identical capacity was 6 1/2 long tons (6.6 t; 7.3 short tons) lighter than an air-conditioned E type carriage. However, the new carriages retained the compartment layout already in use in the AE and BE carriages.

Twelve carriages were ordered for construction at Newport Workshops; five first-class carriages, numbered 1 to 5; four second-class carriages, 6 to 9; the guard's van, the Dining car and the Parlor car. The latter was always spelled in the American way, without the "u". Each of the sitting cars were 71 ft 6 in (21.79 m) long over body with a further 1 ft 9 in (533 mm) at either end being occupied by the interconnecting diaphragm, for a total length of 75 feet (22.86 m). These diaphragms could compress by up to two inches (51 mm) each. The guards' van was 60 ft (18.29 m) over diaphragms, 58 ft 8 in (17.88 m) when coupled at both ends.

Each passenger carriage featured eight compartments, with the only differences being the number of seats per compartment: six, wider seats for first class, or eight, slightly narrower seats, for second class. Each seat had its own reading lamp and at least one folding armrest, which could be raised to be flush with the rest of the seat if preferred. Soft, diffused lighting was provided, hidden inside the walls and aimed at the ceiling to avoid blinding the passengers. Each compartment was fitted with a large, double-pane, single window, claimed at the time to be "unshatterable". At the time these windows were the first the railways had used, which could not be opened; instead they were sealed to ensure the efficiency of the air-conditioning system. This glass was also used in all doors, whether for the compartment or along the corridor, separating various portions. Three of the eight compartments, at the No. 1 end of the carriage, were designated for smoking passengers – although curiously, all compartments were fitted with ashtrays.

All onboard systems were powered by axle-mounted generators, with a large under-slung battery available for use when the train was not moving. Additionally, carriages could be connected individually to an external power supply, if something suitable was available and the train was to be stationary for a long time.

Extensive testing was carried out to ensure maximum comfort with the type of seat selected. The final seat design was sprung, and padded with horsehair manually inserted to give the right contour as tested against a template. Then the seats were upholstered with leather, designed, cut and fitted to each seat before installation in the carriage. When installed, seats were a little over 2 ft 6 in (0.76 m) deep. Each passenger compartment also included roller blinds over the windows, and an individual radiator fitted to the outer wall and protected with a steel grille. On the opposite side, each compartment door was fitted with a hand-crafted louvre to permit air recycling.

Rubber linoleum was used as the floor covering, directly over the steel carriage underframe. This covered the entire floor surface, and met a rubber curbing along the sides of the corridors which was placed over the wall coverings to protect from foot marks. Otherwise, the walls were sheeted with a veneer of selected Australian timbers; different timbers were used in the first and second class carriages, to match the colours of the seats. Toilets in each carriage had Terrazzo flooring applied, finely ground, then polished.

A different type of chair was custom-designed for use in the Parlor and Dining cars, each one handcrafted "with due regard to comfort and durability". The dining car was also fitted with an on-board kitchen section, again designed and built to the highest standards possible at the time. The stove, for example, was insulated with rock-wool, noted for high levels of insulation resulting in an appreciable level of fuel economy. Venetian blinds were used exclusively in the rounded end of the Parlor car.

The guards van was designed somewhat differently from previous types, which had had a guards' compartment at either end of the carriage with a cupola, and a mail/baggage section in the middle of the van. The steel CE Van instead had, from the "front" end, a single luggage compartment, then a single guards compartment, then two further luggage compartments. Both ends of the van were fitted with walk-through, full-width, collapsible diaphragms. The central guards compartment was fitted with periscopes aimed in each direction, allowing the guard to observe signals and perform other duties as required. The three luggage sections could between them take around 20 long tons (20 t; 22 short tons) of luggage. Van-side doors were each fitted with three windows initially, and the door sliding mechanisms were designed to allow the doors to run flush with the shell of the carriage when closed. Additionally, a dog-box was provided in each corner of the van, accessible only from the outside.

To give the proper feel of a streamlined train, the S class locomotives would be fitted with a steel sheeting matching the train; diaphragms on the ends of the locomotive tenders and all the passenger carriages were full-width instead of inset, and painted to match the rest of the train, and van doors were designed to run flush to the sides of the carriages. All this was done both to reduce air resistance at the train's maximum official speed of 115 km/h (71 mph), and to give the impression of one long, solid unit. However, the wider design of diaphragm meant that any locomotive with full buffers could not be coupled to, or used to shunt, these carriages, as the buffers would pierce or otherwise damage the vestibule fittings. As a result, a number of D4 locomotives were fitted with half-buffers to avoid this problem.

== Construction ==
All carriages were built at Newport Workshops, using CorTen steel.

After completion, the carriages were spray-painted with two coats of Dulux Royal Blue, product number 041. Over this, two parallel lines of gold leaf were manually applied; a two-inch-thick (51 mm) line above the window line, and a three-inch-thick (76 mm) line below the window line. These stripes extended the full length of the train, from the streamlined sides of the S Class locomotives, along the tender sides, across all of the diaphragms and carriage sides, then around the rounded end of the Parlor car and back around to the other side of the locomotive. The majority of this gold leaf had to be applied over rivets, making for a difficult application process. Gold leaf was also used for the external signage, such as "First", "Second", "Dining Car" and "Parlor Car".

== Operations ==
=== Original Spirit of Progress fleet, riveted sides ===
Late 1937 saw all of the original order of twelve carriages delivered, bar one of the first-class sitting cars, No. 4. The other eight sitting cars entered service on 14 November 1937; the Dining and Parlor cars on the 17th, and the steel CE van on the 18th.

This gave the maximum-length 11-car train for the debut of the Spirit of Progress at 6:30pm, 23 November 1937. Before this date the train ran a number of demonstration runs to Geelong, Ballarat and Bendigo on the 18th, 19th and 22nd respectively, being displayed at those locations from lunchtime to around 9pm before running back to Melbourne. The train was also displayed at Platform 7 at Spencer Street, from 9am to 9pm on Saturday 20 November. The first run, hauled by locomotive S302 "Edward Henty", included from the Albury end, the steel CE van, cars 6 to 9, the Dining Car, cars 1 to 3 and 5, and the Parlor Car. (The order of passenger cars either side of the dining car is not known.)

As at the time the code for the new carriages had not yet been decided, the passenger cars were released to service unclassed and simply numbered 1 to 9. Some official correspondence refers to the carriages as "Steel E type carriage" – for example, "Steel AE 1" when referring to the first of the passenger cars. The Dining and Parlor cars apparently began life with those identities, and the guards van was known as the Steel CE Van.

April 1938 saw a further two steel cars delivered; the missing first class carriage, Number 4, on the 4th, and a new addition to the fleet, Steel Bulk Mail, on the 5th. The former was identical to cars 1 to 3 and 5, and is believed to have suffered fire damage during construction delaying its entering service. The latter was similar to the Steel CE van but without the guards compartment, and the end diaphragms, while present, were blanked off and as such could not be used to access another carriage. As a result, the van compartments were of varying lengths and the doors were not evenly spaced. The trade-off was that the mail van had a total capacity of 25 long tons (25 t; 28 short tons).

With the completion of the Steel Bulk Mail van, one second-class carriage was deleted from the standard Spirit of Progress consist leaving eleven cars in daily use. The train was then composed of four first-class and three second-class sitting cars, plus the mail, guard, Dining and Parlor cars. This left one of each class of sitting carriage spare for a rotating maintenance schedule; if one of the other cars was unavailable, Dining Car could be replaced with Avoca (a Long W type carriage), Steel Bulk Mail could be replaced with 1D (a 1929-build steel replacement for a destroyed E-type mail van), and the Steel CE could be replaced with a standard timber CE. There was no official replacement for the Parlor car, although in theory it could have been replaced with one of the open-end Parlor cars (Murray or Yarra) which had previously graced the rear of the Melbourne/Sydney Express.

=== New dining cars, construction method experimentation ===
Shortly after Clapp's visit to America, the rollingstock branch used the new lessons to produce a design for an altered E type carriage with an internal buffet. The new car, Buffet Car No. 1 and later named Taggerty, was introduced to the Bendigo line on 5 April 1937, then used daily except Sundays.

From the experience gained with Buffet Car No. 1, four all-steel S type buffet cars were constructed using a similar body shell to that of the previous builds. Two buffet cars were constructed initially, Number 2, released to service on 19 December 1938, and Number 3, released to service on 14 Feb 1939. Both these cars were fitted with a kitchen area and a full-length buffet seating 27 diners, with no regular passenger seating or compartments. A few months later, cars 5 (1 June 1939) and 4 (31 July 1939) were released to service. These later cars were classified as compartment buffets, having two first-class compartments at one end and a shorter buffet counter allowing for 18 diners. All cars were later named after rivers in Victoria; respectively, these were Wimmera, Mitta Mitta, Tanjil and Moorabool. All four cars, when built, were painted in a deep red intended as a rough approximation of the red scheme then in use on the timber passenger fleet; this red extended over the roof. Additionally, a pair of silver stripes, 2 in (51 mm) above the window line and 3 in (76 mm) below the window line, were added. The silver colour was also used when applying the Art Deco style carriage names and Buffet Car lettering; the former about halfway between the 3-inch line and the underframe of the car, and the latter immediately above the 2-inch line. All lettering was located centrally on the car. Window frames were painted silver. The kitchen of each car included an Esse Fuel Stove, similar in design to that included in the Spirit of Progress's Dining Car. In all cases the kitchen area was located at one end of the car, rather than being placed centrally like in Taggerty.

Each carriage was under the charge of an all-female staff of a supervisor, three to five waitresses as required, a cook and an assistant. The buffet stocked cigarettes, tobacco and confectionery, in addition to light meals and refreshments.

Wimmera and Mitta Mitta weighed 51 long tons (52 t; 57 short tons) each, while Tanjil and Moorabool came in at just over 50 long tons (51 t; 56 short tons).

==== Recycled names ====
While Tanjil and Moorabool were new names, the other two were recycled from previous rollingstock. The name Mitta Mitta had previously been applied to a special-purpose car, built in 1910 using the bodies of two Ministerial vehicles dating back to 1880; the car was renamed Edinburgh in 1889, then Mitta Mitta in December 1910. In July 1924 the car was rebuilt as a Medical Test and Vision car, used with a travelling doctor to ensure that all Victorian Railways staff were healthy enough to safely work. The car was pulled from service and demolished in May 1939. In its place, E type carriage Wimmera was removed from passenger service, refitted and renamed as the new Medical Test and Vision car from October 1938. This vehicle may have been selected once Taggerty was deemed an appropriate replacement. So the selection of names "Wimmera" and "Mitta Mitta" could be deemed appropriate, given their association with each other.

==== Changes to design ====
The full buffet cars did not feature side doors for passengers whilst the compartment buffets had doors on each side at the compartment end in the same style as all other sitting cars. A single side door was provided for accessing the staff and kitchen area. Other changes included a thin aluminium plate over the ends of the full-width diaphragms, to hide the open-end framework.

Wimmera was fitted with indirect, central-trough lighting, while the other three were fitted with semi-recessed circular light units recessed into the ceiling.

While Wimmera, Mitta Mitta and Moorabool used the same construction method as the first Spirit of Progress carriages, research by Peter Clark has indicated that Tanjil was constructed differently. This car was used as a test-bed for all-welded construction methods, which Clapp had seen on the Milwaukee Road, in 1934 during his trip to America. This gives Tanjil a smooth finish on the sides, rather than the riveted sides of all earlier carriages.

==== In service ====
At this time, the Spirit of Progress was still operating as a maximum 11-car train, leaving one first class and one second class carriage spare. Often, the Steel Bulk Mail van was not required.

Wimmera and Mitta Mitta were attached to The Overland in place of Goulburn, Campaspe, Avoca and Hopkins.

Tanjil and Moorabool were rostered on alternate daily (except Sunday) runs from Melbourne to Warrnambool and Horsham, with the former first running on 8 August 1939, although this practice was terminated not long after due to wartime restrictions. The pair were stored in Newport Workshops, along with E type carriages 21AE and 26AE, which were planned to be converted to further buffet cars with a similar layout to Taggerty.

=== 1939 – Introduction of the S carriage class ===
By mid 1939, it was becoming clear that referring to the new steel carriages as "Steel (timber class)" was becoming unworkable. As a result, the more sensible S type carriage group was created and on 30 August 1939 the cars were officially re-classed; cars 1 to 5 became 1AS to 5AS; cars 6 to 9 became 1BS to 4BS, and the Steel CE and Steel Bulk Mail vans became 1CS and 1DS respectively (note DS had previously been used by an E-Type mail sorting van). The Dining Car and Parlor Car retained those identities, while the four buffet cars were known alternately by their names or as Buffet Car No.X.

==== First all-welded passenger cars ====
Following the success of the electric-arc welding construction method for Tanjil, six further passenger cars were ordered from Newport Workshops. 1940 saw delivered three new AS carriages, 6, 7 and 8, and three new BS carriages, 5, 6 and 7. These six cars were painted in the same livery as the buffet cars; red with silver lines and text in an Art Deco font. As the cars were under construction at the outbreak of World War II, they could not be finished to the same high standard as the previous builds. The internal timber veneer linings were disposed of; instead the surfaces were painted a pastel grey shade, later changed to cream. This proved to be a much less durable covering in service.

=== Operations during World War 2 ===
The six new red carriages were used on the Albury Express, replacing E type carriages which had been fitted with air-conditioning. This train was effectively a second-division run of the Spirit of Progress, further proven by the locomotive roster for this train also being an S class locomotive. (Note that the four S class locomotives had all been painted in blue with gold leaf by 1938, with the two red streamliners the first so treated – in 1937. Therefore, it was never possible to have had a red S Class locomotive on the front of an all-steel, red Albury Express.)

AE and BE air-conditioned carriages removed from the Albury Express were then moved to other services, like the Bendigo midday.

=== 1945 to 1952 ===
==== New carriages, 9AS to 16AS & State Car 5 ====
As part of the war recovery, more S type carriages were built. Starting from 1948 further AS cars were constructed, with 9AS and 10AS released to service on 2 December 1948; 11AS on the 22nd and 12AS on 29 March 1949, and 13AS on 20 May that year. 14AS entered service a year later, on 9 May 1950, while 15AS and 16AS were added on 4 and 12 December 1952. All of these carriages were released to service in the same livery as the previous red cars, with silver lines. The only noticeable change is the picking-out of some large underframe equipment in silver.

However, these carriages were not identical to the war-time built cars (6 to 8AS), with some of the modifications from the original design not applied. For instance, the end diaphragm units did not have the flat aluminium ends applied, and the carriages were all fitted with varnished timber wall linings. One new alteration to the design was the division of the toilet compartments at each end of the carriage into two smaller areas, thus separating the toilet from the sink. These carriage bodies were mostly welded, although some cars were built with a line of rivets along the bottom of the sides.

In 1951, State Car 5 was built in preparation for upcoming 1952 Royal Tour, as the previous State Car (Number 4, built in 1912) was beginning to show its age. This new car was initially painted in the same dark red as the other cars, albeit without any sort of lining; instead the Royal Coat of Arms was placed on the centre of the carriage sides: transfers of the proper design were obtained from the Canadian Pacific Railway for this. By the time of the 1954 Royal tour, the car had been painted into VR Blue and Gold, with a new application of the royal insignia in the middle of each side. This insignia was covered by sheet-metal when not used by members of royalty (or their representatives in Australia).

==== In service ====
From 1945, Wimmera and Mitta Mitta ran alternate journeys as part of the Albury Express. Tanjil was stored at the Spencer Street dining car depot as a spare vehicle, and Moorabool was rostered on the Gippslander from 1952. The new sitting carriages, when not being used on the Albury Express or taking over a spot on the Spirit of Progress, would have been available for use on other services.

==== Repaints and changing schemes ====
Moorabool, and probably the other buffet cars, received a repaint in 1950 – for the first time since their construction prior to the Second World War. No changes were made to the livery at this time, but the paint had faded quite drastically over the intervening decade. A second repaint occurred in 1953. However, by this time the railways had stopped using gold-leaf or gold paint on the blue carriages, instead switching to yellow transfers for lining and lettering. These were applied to at least some of the red carriages in lieu of painted silver lines, and the different base resulted in cream-coloured lines and lettering. 5BS and 6BS were repainted to blue with gold paint to serve as spares for the Spirit of Progress, although it is not known when this occurred.

=== 1953 to 1962 – New carriages 7BS to 14BS, The Overland and The Intercapital Daylight ===
==== The Overland (ABS) ====
In early 1953, the South Australian Railways withdrew their 750-class excursion carriages from The Overland, as these, while of steel construction, were not air-conditioned. These carriages had provided 22 first- and 24 second-class seats, and a replacements were required. The Victorian Railways decided to convert two AS carriages, and so in autumn of that year cars 12AS and 13AS were altered to composite carriages 1ABS and 2ABS respectively. Each car retained the existing compartments at the first class end, but had second-class seats installed in the other half, providing accommodation for a total of 24 first- and 32 second-class passengers. Two compartments of each class (half of the total seats) were reserved for smokers, and intermediate doors were installed in the corridor to separate these sections. Both carriages were painted deep red with thick silver stripes to match the then-new Overland J type carriages, however the black roof was not applied to the S cars. Window frames were red on the vertical and silver on the horizontal, to match the silver stripes. Lettering was in a plain silver with no special fonts.

The new cars were used to provide the same roadside service as the 750-class carriages, which had previously been used for passengers wishing to travel only part of the length of The Overland – for example, to and from Stawell or Horsham. This was done to allow passengers from those towns to travel to Melbourne or Adelaide and return in the same day; arrival at Melbourne would be at 9am, and departure at 8pm.

It is not clear whether 12AS and 13AS spent any time in VR Blue and Gold between the red/silver and Overland liveries, although this is unlikely.

==== Change from red/silver to blue/gold ====
1954 saw an official change of colour scheme following the Royal Tour, and it was decided that the red/silver carriages (other than the two Overland ABS vehicles) would be repainted to a standard blue and yellow scheme, perhaps to better match the blue diesels that were quickly arriving. The carriages previously fitted with gold leaf had this replaced with Dulux 16078 Yellow, which better matched the paint of the new diesels and was much cheaper to apply and touch-up. It was also decided to paint the air-conditioned E type carriages and a number of CE vans in the blue and yellow livery.

Repainting was slow, and in the short term the railways chose to use transfers instead of liquid paint with stencils, to ensure accuracy when applying class designations and the 2" and 3" stripes along the sides of the carriages. Occasionally a yellow transfer would be placed on a red carriage where the silver stripes had previously been; this would result in a cream colour, both for lines and lettering. This scheme first appeared on the debut run of The Gippslander, hauled by a L Class on 21 July 1954.

Wimmera and Mitta Mitta were painted blue in 1956, and Moorabool followed in 1958. It is thought that the latter was the last car in the red and silver livery. It is not known when Tanjil changed colour schemes.

==== New-build BS vehicles ====
In 1955–56, a further eight BS vehicles were constructed, numbered 8BS to 14BS. These new cars were fitted with fluorescent lighting from new, as had been installed in State Car 5 in 1951. 8BS was released in April 1955, then cars were delivered on a production line with a new one appearing every two to three months until December 1956. All were painted in blue and yellow from the outset, and were constructed in a similar fashion to the last of the AS fleet, with smooth sides other than the dual line of rivets down the bottom of the carriage. It is not known whether these carriages were fitted with full-width diaphragms from the beginning or at all, but this is unlikely.

Additional underframes were prepared for further construction, but these were utilised in the following Victorian Railways Z type carriage builds instead. This explains why some of the early Z type carriages have rivets along the lower edge of the body sides.

==== The Intercapital Daylight (ABS & Lounge/Club Car) ====
In September 1956, car 9AS was similarly altered internally to become 3ABS. However, the car was not repainted into the Overland colour scheme. This car was occasionally used on the Overland service to replace one of the other two, but for the most part its conversion was for the new The Daylight service running from Melbourne to Albury.

This new train, which had been introduced on 26 March 1956, initially ran only three days per week; to Albury on one day, then running back to Melbourne/Sydney the next. From 24 September the trains ran daily except Sunday, and the Melbourne half ran non-stop. The train towards Sydney ran in the early morning and connected at Albury, then turned on the Wodonga triangle and stabled until time to meet the arrival from Sydney and run back to Melbourne.

This train also included the former Parlor Car, now renamed the Lounge Car, in its eight-carriage standard consist. In 1958 the car was renamed again, this time to the Club Car (not to be confused with the three Overland Club Cars built in 1970).

Notably, around this time the Z type carriages were introduced; these were of a similar design but with a saloon layout internally, with two rows of seats either side of a central walkway in lieu of compartments.

==== Upgraded bogies ====
From the late 1950s, the S fleet were provided with upgraded bogies; Tanjil for instance was refitted at Newport Workshops and re-entered service on 4 June 1959.

By 1987 the original fabricated S car bogies needed replacement, and were being progressively swapped out for recycled bogies from withdrawn Harris cars. The Commonwealth bogies were numbered VCP1-100, and were distinguished by a double spring next under each side of the bolster. Mainline bogies were numbered VMP101-200 and were similar but featured bogie-mounted brake cylinders. Vickers-Ruwolt bogies, as used under the N cars, were numbered VVBP201-400. Ex-Harris bogies had single spring nests and were coded VHP401-500, and original Spirit bogies were VSP501-600 and designed with leaf springs rather than coils in the centre.

=== Standard gauge classes, 1962-on ===
To provide rollingstock for the service to Sydney after the 1962 standardisation project, a number of carriages were converted to standard gauge. Because the codes would have overlapped with existing New South Railways codes, the cars were reclassed; the new codes were an approximation of appropriate NSW carriage codes, but with a "V" prefix to indicate the Victorian Railways as the owner.

The cars converted in 1962 were:

- 5BS and 6BS to VAC, as composite first class sitting/sleeping cars 2VAC and 1VAC respectively.
- VFS cars 1 to 4 from BS 10, 11, 14, and 9 respectively. No changes made aside from gauge and identity, and a slightly altered external handrail design to cater for the NSW loading gauge. In 1964 cars 3 and 4 were converted to 1 and 2VFR respectively, by removing two compartments and inserting a short buffet section.
- 12BS and 13BS to 1VFX and 2VFX, a subtype of the VFS class with six of the eight compartments for passengers, and the final two compartments made staff-only, for use by the train hostesses and waitresses.
- Mitta Mitta, Wimmera and Tanjil to 1VRS to 3VRS respectively; Moorabool was not converted. Tanjil modified to a full-length buffet but with 28 seats instead of 27, and the external passenger doors were welded shut. On all three, plates with the train name were attached over the carriage names.
- 1VHN and 2VHN (ex 1CS and 2CS).
- Additional carriages of the VBW and VFW classes were sourced from the W type carriage fleet, van 35CE as 1VHE, and VFK, VBK and VAM carriages from the Z type carriage fleet, for a total of 36 carriages.

The steel carriages had art-deco font "VR" logos added at the corners, as well as car-number holding plates; however these were not applied in time for the inaugural run. The three VRS carriages had "Spirit of Progress" plates attached over the carriage names.

=== Broad gauge in the 1960s and 1970s ===
After the Intercapital Daylight and Spirit of Progress had been moved to the standard gauge, the Victorian Railways' fleet of broad gauge steel carriages was cut quite drastically. This was not an immediate problem because the trains were transferred across with their stock, but some services to Albury were retained on the broad gauge. As a result, more carriages were needed. Around the same time, the air-conditioned first class E type carriages, 1AE, 3AE, 12AE and 36AE, were converted to second class vehicles, to replace the second-class steel carriages that had been transferred across and to equalise the first- and second-class fleet sizes. Including the E and Z type fleets, there were then 21 first-class, 3 composite and 23 second-class air-conditioned sitting carriages on the broad gauge, along with special cars Moorabool, Avoca, Murray and Norman.

The dining car Moorabool was retained on The Gippslander, having replaced E type carriage Avoca.

7AS was the first air-conditioned steel carriage to enter regular service on the Yarram line, starting from December 1962.

The Parlor/Lounge/Club Car was renamed Norman in 1963, taking its name from another carriage. The rounded end was modified with a diaphragm plate and door added to allow regular coupling to other vehicles as required, if and when the vehicle visited locations without suitable turning facilities. From this date, Norman was used as the Railway Commissioner's personal vehicle, used whenever they had to travel on official business or on their yearly inspection tours.

The Dining Car was renamed Murray in January 1963 and from 10 April 1964 it was transferred to standard gauge, as a spare vehicle which could be used if one of the three VRS buffet cars had to be pulled from service at short notice. To allow for this, the car was fitted with head-end power cables, but it retained its axle generators as an alternative power source much like Z type carriages 3AZ and 3BZ. In practice Murray proved surplus to standard gauge requirements and by 24 July 1964 it was restored to broad gauge as a spare dining car available for hire, or, like Avoca, it could be used to replace Taggerty on the Bendigo line or Moorabool on the Gippsland line when either of those was due for maintenance. The name Murray was recycled from another E type carriage, one of two former parlor cars used from 1906 on the Melbourne/Sydney express.

As of mid-1963, the broad gauge S type fleet included:

- AS 1, 2, 3, 4, 5, 6, 7, 8, 10, 11, 14, 15, & 16
- ABS 1, 2, & 3
- BS 1, 2, 3, 4, 7, & 8
- Moorabool, Murray & Norman

All were painted in blue and yellow, except 1ABS and 2ABS which were painted in a red and silver scheme to match the new Overland livery on the Melbourne to Adelaide service.

Other air-conditioned cars included:

- AZ 1, 2, 3, 4, 5, 6, 7, & 8
- BZ 1, 2, 3, 4, 5, 6, & 7
- Taggerty, Sleeper No. 4, 4BE, 19BE, 31BE, 34BE, 49BE, 50BE, 51BE, 52BE, 1BG, & 2BG
- Avoca, Sleeper Nos. 1, 2 and 3

In October 1963, 3ABS was converted back to 9AS, by restoring the first class layout to the half of the carriage which had been converted.

==== MBS "Mini-buffet" cars ====
In 1965, it was decided to provide buffet services on broad gauge trains, based on the service provided in the VFR cars and Taggerty. Cars 2BS and 3BS were released to service in 1966 as 1MBS and 2MBS. In 1968 9AS (formerly 3ABS) was converted to 3MBS. The cars were marked externally as "Mini-Buffet". Of the eight original sitting compartments, five were retained. Two of the others were replaced with a serving counter and small eating area for twelve, while the final compartment and the toilet at that end was replaced with a kitchen. 3MBS had originally been allocated to the Mildura Sunlight up to April 1967; when that train was cancelled in favour of The Vinelander the vehicle was temporarily stored then re-allocated to the Albury Express in July of the same year.

In 1983, 1MBS was converted back to BS configuration, firstly to 13BS as its original number had since been taken, then as BS 213 when the New Deal struck. 2MBS and 3MBS retained their food preparation capability, modified to the BRS configuration as BRS227 and BRS9 then BRS229 respectively.

==== Changed lettering ====
In 1966, the previously utilised Art Deco font was replaced with Sans Serif lettering, to match the air-conditioned E type carriages and to keep the Art Deco font exclusively with Spirit of Progress rolling stock.

In 1970, all references to "Second" class were abolished, but his led to passenger confusion so in 1975, cars previously categorised as such were re-labelled as "Economy" class. Rather than markings at the ends of the cars above the doors, the new class markings were applied in the centre. As previously, the art deco font was utilised on standard gauge for the Spirit train, and the sans serif font was applied to the broad gauge carriages.

In 1972, 1ABS was converted back to 12AS, and 2ABS was converted to 15BS. Shortly afterwards, 7AS was destroyed in a derailment.

=== VicRail period (1976 to 1983) ===
In 1977, four carriages were modified and reallocated to the Vinelander service, operating between Spencer Street Station and Mildura. Two sleeping carriages, 1VAC and 2VAC, were recalled from standard gauge operations and modified at Newport Workshops. Their sitting compartments were replaced with additional twinette accommodation, and the cars were reclassed as Sleepers No. 15 and No. 16. Two other carriages, 4BS and 1BS, had five of their eight sitting compartments removed and replaced with an extended buffet and kitchen area, for a total capacity of 24 diners and 24 passengers in the remaining three compartments. These were labelled "Refreshment cars" and coded 1 and 2MRS respectively.

In 1981, a new livery was introduced with an all-over orange body, black below platform level, and two thick silver stripes along the sides at window height.

Under the New Deal, the sleeping cars were recoded SS285 and 286, while the MRS cars had some compartments restored during conversion to the BRS design, becoming 225 and 226 respectively.

==== AS to BS conversions ====
In 1982, two AS carriages, 11 and 2, were converted to 1 and 2BS respectively, recycling the identities of the first two-second class S type carriages. This was around the time of the introduction of the N type carriages and conversion of AZ cars to ACZ, which meant that all trains automatically included first class accommodation; as a result loose first class carriages were generally no longer required.

==== 2VHN scrapped ====
On 17 June 1982, the standard gauge Spirit of Progress with 2VHN trailing had broken down at Barnawatha, Victoria and was struck in the rear by locomotive S317. The van was demolished, being was recorded as "Off Register" on 3 March 1983. The remains were scrapped on 21 September 1984.

=== New Deal (1983 to 1993) ===
One of the first moves of the New Deal was to provide food services on all the long-distance trains, replacing refreshment stops en route to accelerate the timetable and allow better service with fewer train sets. To provide for this, and because passengers generally preferred saloon seating over compartments, ten carriages from the S fleet were converted to the BRS arrangement; six compartments were retained (or restored, in some cases), and the remaining two replaced with a buffet module.

A total of fifteen S type carriages were reconfigured, either from first class to economy seating at $62,000 each or from AS, MRS and MBS to buffet cars at $200,000 each, with the works taking place at Ballarat Workshops. The non-buffet cars retained axle-driven generators and 48VDC power supplies, and so unlike the N type carriages then being introduced it was not possible to share the electrical load between vehicles. A proposal was floated to fit the cars with fluted sides like the then-modern Hitachi and Comeng electric trains, but the concept was rejected following a trial on BRN19.

1983 was the beginning of the New Deal, and many carriages were modified, recoded and renumbered to suit the new arrangements. Notably, under the new scheme the code was placed before the carriage number. Initially 6, 16, and 12AS, 1VFS, 3MBS, and 1VFR were converted to BRS carriages 1 to 3 and 8 to 10 respectively; notably, 1VFS and 1VFR had been returned from standard gauge, reflecting a downturn in interstate travel. Near the end of the year 7BS, 1MRS, and 2MBS were converted to BRS224, 225, and 227 respectively. VRS1 was renumbered 231. The following year the first six BRS vehicles were renumbered to 221 to 223 and 228 to 230 respectively, tying-in with the new system, and 2MRS was converted to BRS226 completing the series of ten. Sleepers 15 and 16 were re-coded SS285 and 286 respectively but were retained on the Vinelander service, though Moorabool was withdrawn from the Gippslander train when that roster was swapped to N sets. 15BS was renumbered to 12BS, and 5AS was converted to 7BS, the latter notable as the original 7BS was still in the workshops being converted at the time. These were later renumbered 212 and 207 while the second 1BS and 2BS became BS201 and BS202 respectively. 4AS and 14AS were directly converted to BS204 and BS205. Further conversions were 8AS to AS206, 1AS to BS209, 15AS to AS210, 10AS to BS3, 8BS to BS208, and VHN1 to VHN241.

Operation of fixed carriage sets was part of the New Deal, as was the introduction of the N type carriages. Before this time S cars could appear on various intrastate trains with other Z type steel carriages, as well as older wooden bodied stock. From the 1980s most of the S cars were placed into Z type carriage sets, and from the mid-1990s were also added to N type sets to increase capacity.

Norman was refurbished in 1985 for hiring out on special services. It was fitted with lateral dampers to reduce swaying at high speeds and given polished woodwork interior fittings, upholstered chairs with capacity for 30 passengers and a modern kitchen. The hiring fee was listed as A$800 to A$1,000 plus catering.

A plan existed in 1987 to convert the three standard gauge buffet cars to combined lounge and snack cars, but this was not practical in the start of the year due to a New South Wales RS dining car not being available, so all three VRS cars were in service and none could be spared for workshop attention. At the same time, 1VFX re-entered service as VFX216 after a long period in the workshops. Around this period the BS and BRS carriages were converted from Commonwealth bogies to recycled Harris motor car bogies, which looked similar but had a different brake cylinder placement. The Z type carriages, along with S cars converted from standard gauge and the two former Overland ABS cars, retained the Commonwealth bogies. The Harris, Mainline and Commonwealth bogies were all licensed from Bradford Kendall, with the former two names being created internally by V/Line. The name "Commonwealth" as applied to bogies was a product name referring to the General Steel Castings Corporation of Granite City, Illinois, and Eddystone, Pennsylvania, USA.

In 1988, three cars (Norman, Murray, and State Car 5) were repainted into the short-lived V/Line Corporate livery for use on the Royal Train. A fourth car, ACZ252, only spent a few weeks in the scheme.

=== 1990s ===
When the V/Line Sprinter fleet was delivered in the early 1990s a considerable number of the S and Z type carriages were rendered surplus to requirements, and withdrawn.

In 1993, six S type carriages were leased to West Coast Railway as part of fixed consists for use on the Warrnambool Line. These were BRS222 and BS203 in set FZ52, BRS224 and BS205 in set FZ55 and BRS221 and BS207 in set FZ57, and each car retained the orange, green and white V/Line scheme but with "W" decals applied over the V/Line logos on the carriage sides.

In 1994, BRS228 was deemed surplus to regular requirements, and so was re-allocated as the staff car on the Royal Train to replace Goulburn. It entered Newport Workshops in December 1993 and emerged in August 1994, renamed as Mitta Mitta after the buffet car. The new interior had three compartments converted to two-berth accommodation (thought to have used components from SS285 and SS286), plus an extended dining area, showers, one normal eight-seater compartment, and retention toilets fitted. The car was never used in service.

In April 1995, the carriages leased to West Coast Railway were directly sold, as that company had earned the right to operate its own trains directly. That sale included the above-listed six vehicles, plus BRS225. In September 1995, a derailment at Werribee damaged BS203 and BRS222 (among other vehicles), so these were traded for V/Line's then-surplus BS212 and BRS223. October 1995 saw an additional set of carriages – BS201, BS208, BS210, and BRS229 – sold to West Coast Railway. That left V/Line Passenger with only five active vehicles, BS215 to BS219, all painted orange and placed in what was intended as long-term storage.

In 1997, some Sprinter vehicles were damaged (and one unit was written off), so BS216 was reactivated on 25 December 1997 followed by BS217, BS218, and BS219. BS215 was kept in storage for longer before finally re-joining the active fleet. In December 1997, 1BS was leased from the Seymour Railway Heritage Centre by National Rail for use as a radio test vehicle. It was fitted with standard gauge bogies and travelled as far afield as Brisbane, Alice Springs and Perth before being returned in April 1998.

In the early 1990s, van 1CS (ex 241VHN) was converted to a test car for accompanying rolling stock testing activities. After fulfilling that role for a short period of time, the vehicle was sold to Great Northern Railway. When that operation closed down, the van was sold to Southern Shorthaul Railroad; shortly after that it was purchased by the Seymour Railway Heritage Centre.

=== 21st century ===
==== Crew cars ====
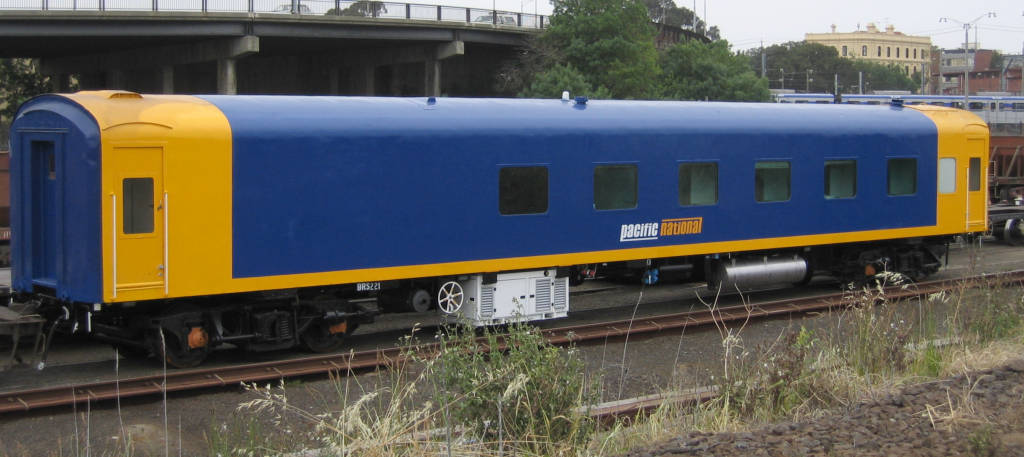
Carriage BRS221, converted into a crew car for Pacific National

Many of the carriages from West Coast Railway were on-sold to various operators and refurbished for use as crew cars on long-haul services.

==== SN7 / Z57 / SZ7 ====
The five BS carriages 215 to 219 operated with V/Line as part of various consists up to 2006, when they were once again placed in storage following deliveries of the VLocity railcar fleet. However, the Kerang rail accident in 2007 saw some N type carriages damaged, so the five BS carriages were recalled to service and coupled to ACN21. The new set, SN7, ran for about two years before BCZ257 was substituted for ACN21; the S cars were withdrawn again in 2010.

In April 2017, V/Line finally decided that the S type carriages were surplus to requirements, and a tendering process was organised to dispose of them. In March 2018, it was announced that the Seymour Railway Heritage Centre had acquired 216, 218, and 219, while 707 Operations purchased 215. 217 was made available to both groups as a source of spare parts. In the intermediate period 2010–2017, the carriages had some parts removed for use elsewhere, including bogies. For depot transfers and future use, the new operators are to replace those pieces. Many of the carriages have suffered external damage and one had been broken into, with a dry powder fire extinguisher being exhausted over the seats. Apart from this, they are still in good condition.

==== Current status ====
By original S-type identity, with current identity in brackets.

===== With mainline operators =====
- In service, Pacific National: 6AS (BRS 221), 12AS (BRS 223), 16AS (BRS 222), 4BS (BRS225) – Crew Cars
- In service, Aurizon: 15AS (QBCY 10-W), 8BS (QBCY 8-R) – Crew Cars
- Scrapped: 7AS, 1DS

===== Preserved =====
- In service, 707 Operations, Newport West Block: 13AS (BS212), 14AS (BS205), 7BS (Williamstown BRS224), 9BS (BS215)
- In service, Seymour Railway Heritage Centre: 3AS, 4AS, 1BS, 3BS owned by the Victorian Railways (formerly GSRS) on loan to the SRHC, 10BS (Mitta Mitta), 11BS, 1CS (owned outright, purchased ex SSR), Dining Car, Parlor Car, State Car 5.
- Stored, Seymour Railway Heritage Centre: 1AS, 2AS, 10AS, 5BS (BS219), 6BS (BS218), 12BS (BS216), 13BS (BS217), & Buffet 4 (VRS233) .
- In service, Steamrail Victoria, Newport West Block: 5AS (BS207), 8AS (BS206), 9AS (BRS9), 11AS, 2BS (BS213), 14BS (BRS14), & Buffet 5 (Moorabool)
- Privately Owned: Buffet 2 (VRS232), stored at Tailem Bend, SA.
- Static display: Buffet 3 (VRS231), Australian Railway Historical Society Museum, Williamstown North

Codes & Status of S type Carriage Fleet
Original Code							Current Code	Location
1	1AS	9BS	209BS	1AS			1AS	SRHC
2	2AS	2BS	202BS	2AS			2AS	SRHC
3	3AS	11BS	211BS	3AS			3AS	SRHC (Currently on Standard Gauge)
4	4AS	204BS	4AS				4AS	SRHC (Currently on Standard Gauge)
5	5AS	5BS	7BS	207BS	5AS		5AS	Steamrail
6AS	1BRS	221BRS					221BRS	PN
7AS	Scrapped 1972						-	Scrapped
8AS	206AS	206BS	8AS				8AS	Steamrail
9AS	3ABS	9AS	3MBS	9BRS	229BRS	9BRS	9BRS	Steamrail
10AS	3BS	203BS					10AS	SRHC
11AS	1BS	201BS	11AS				11AS	Steamrail
12AS	1ABS	12AS	3BRS	223BRS			223BRS	PN
13AS	2ABS	15BS	12BS	212BS			212BS	707 OPS
14AS	205BS						205BS	707 OPS
15AS	210AS	210BS					QCBY10W	Aurizon
16AS	2BRS	222BRS					222BRS	PN
6	1BS	2MRS	226BRS	1BS			1BS	SRHC (Currently on Standard Gauge)
7	2BS	1MBS	13BS	213BS	2BS		2BS	Steamrail
8	3BS	2MBS	227BRS	3BS			3BS	SRHC
9	4BS	1MRS	225BRS				225BRS	PN
5BS	2VAC	Sleeper 16	286SS	219BS			219BS	SRHC
6BS	1VAC	Sleeper 15	285SS	218BS			218BS	SRHC
7BS	224BRS						224BRS	707 OPS
8BS	208BS	QCBY8R					QCBY8R	Aurizon
9BS	4VFS	2VFR	215VFR	215BS			215BS	707 OPS
10BS	1VFS	8BRS	228BRS	Mitta Mitta (3rd)			Mitta Mitta	SRHC
11BS	2VFS	214VFS	214BS	11BS			11BS	SRHC (Currently on Standard Gauge)
12BS	1VFX	216VFX	216BS				216BS	SRHC
13BS	217VFX	217BS					217BS	SRHC
14BS	3VFS	1VFR	10BRS	230BRS	14BRS		14BRS	Steamrail
Mitta Mitta (2nd)	Buffet 2	1VRS	231VRS	Mitta Mitta			Mitta Mitta	ARHS
Wimmera	Buffet 3	2VRS	232VRS	Wimmera			Wimmera	Tailem Bend
Tanjil	Buffet 4	3VRS	233VRS	Tanjil			Tanjil	SRHC
Moorabool	Buffet 5	RS234	Moorabool				Moorabool	Steamrail
Dining	Murray	RS236	Murray				Dining	SRHC
Parlor	Norman	OS237	Parlor				Parlor	SRHC (Currently on Standard Gauge)
State No. 5							State No. 5	SRHC
Steel CE	1CS	1VHN	241VHN	241CS	1CS		1CS	SRHC (Currently on Standard Gauge)
Steel Bulk Mail	1DS	2CS	2VHN	Scrapped 1984			-	Scrapped

== Fleet details ==
=== Sitting cars ===
Sitting cars
- Constructed: 1937-1956
- Number built: 30
- Number scrapped: 1 (7AS in 1972)
- Fleet numbers: No's 1-9; 1-16AS & 206, 210AS; 1-15BS; & BS201-219; 1-3ABS; 1-4VFS & VFS214; 1-2VFX & 216-217VFX
- Capacity: 48 1st class passengers (AS); 64 2nd class passengers (BS, VFS); 24 1st & 32 2nd class passengers (ABS); 48 2nd class passengers plus two crew compartments (VFX)

Specifications
- Doors: inside-swinging, four corners
- Weight: 48 LT 15 cwt 0 qtr (49.53 t) (AS with diaphragm plates) 44 LT 6 cwt 0 qtr (45.01 t) (BS); 44 LT 16 cwt 0 qtr (45.52 t) (ABS); 46 LT 2 cwt 0 qtr (46.84 t) (VFS) 45 LT 6 cwt 0 qtr (46.03 t) (VFX)
- Axle load: 12 LT 3 cwt 3 qtr (12.38 t) (AS with diaphragm plates) 11 LT 1 cwt 2 qtr (11.25 t) (BS); 11 LT 4 cwt 0 qtr (11.38 t) (ABS); 11 LT 10 cwt 2 qtr (11.71 t) (VFS) 11 LT 6 cwt 2 qtr (11.51 t) (VFX)

The S type carriage sitting cars all used a fairly straightforward arrangement, with eight compartments opening onto a side corridor accessed by a vestibule at either end with doors to the outside on each side, and inter-carriage diaphragms. First class carriages, later AS class, seated six passengers across two black leather benches in each compartment for a total capacity of 48, and each bench had two retractable arm-rests fitted. The second class carriages, later BS, used green leather seating with a single central retractable armrest, and were rated at 64 passengers with eight per compartment.

==== AS ====
Sixteen AS carriages were built in total from 1937 to 1952. The first five were intended for the Spirit of Progress, and painted royal blue with gold leaf lining applied to the sides. The remaining 11 cars entered service in a red scheme with two silver painted lines in lieu of the gold leaf.

9AS, 12AS, and 13AS were temporarily classed ABS from 1953; 9AS was restored in 1963, and 12AS in 1972. 9AS became 3MBS in 1968.

2ABS (ex 13AS) became 15BS in 1972, around the same time that 7AS was scrapped following a derailment near Werribee in 1970.

From the early 1980s, the cars were recycled to other types, as first class demand had dropped off significantly. Eight AS cars (1 to 5, 10, 11, and 14) were converted directly to BS (numbers 209, 2/202, 211, 204, 7/207, 3/203, 1/201, 205) followed by AS206 (ex 8AS) and AS210 (ex 15AS), which became BS206 and BS210 immediately when parts became available. 6AS, 12AS, and 16AS were used to create BRS buffet cars 1/221, 3/223, and 2/222. 9AS was converted to 9BRS, and shortly after renumbered to BRS229.

BS cars 207, 203, and 205 (ex AS cars 5, 10, and 14) and BRS cars 221 and 222 (ex AS cars 6 and 16) were sold to West Coast Railway in April 1995 following a nearly two-year lease. They were later joined by BRS223 (ex 12AS) and BS201 (ex 11AS), leaving V/Line with cars BS202, 204, 206, 209, and 211 (ex cars 2AS, 4AS, 8AS, 1AS, and 3AS respectively). Of those, BS206 and BS209 were sold to Steamrail Victoria; the former is now in service, while the latter is stored awaiting restoration. Seymour Railway Heritage Centre acquired BS204 and BS211, with the latter renumbered to 3AS and both in service.

West Coast Railway ceased operations in 2004, and their fleet was dispersed. BS cars 201 (ex 11AS), 203 (ex 10AS), 207 (ex 5AS), and 229BRS (ex 9AS) went to Steamrail Victoria; the latter of those was renumbered 9BRS, and they are all now in service in blue and yellow. 707 Operations purchased BS205 (ex 14AS) and BS212 (ex 13AS), now both in maroon and operational. BRS 221, 222, and 223 (ex AS 6, 16, and 12) were sold to Pacific National for use as crew cars. BRS229 (ex 9AS) was renumbered an unorthodox 9BRS and painted in blue and yellow by Steamrail Victoria. BS210 (ex 15AS) went to Queensland Rail, now Aurizon, and now operates as crew car QBCY10W.

==== ABS ====
Three ABS carriages were converted from first class carriages. Four compartments had their first class seats removed, and second class seats were substituted. 1ABS and 2ABS were converted in 1953 and painted in maroon with silver to provide short-distance capacity on the Melbourne to Adelaide Overland train, and were generally marshalled adjacent to the van; when the train stopped at short platforms, it made sense to have the van and the short-distance cars near each other as very few sleeping passengers would be exiting. The other two were painted in blue and yellow from around 1967, and in 1972 1ABS was restored to 12AS, while 2ABS (ex 13AS) became 15BS instead.

3ABS was converted in 1956 and painted in blue and yellow (over its previous red with silver scheme as 9AS), for use on the Daylight Express from Melbourne to Albury, connecting with a train to Sydney. In 1963 the car reverted to its previous identity of 9AS.

==== BS, VFS, VFX and VFR ====
Fourteen BS carriages were built in total from 1937 to 1956. The first four were intended for the Spirit of Progress, and painted royal blue with gold leaf lining applied to the sides. The remaining 10 cars entered service in a red scheme with two silver painted lines in lieu of the gold leaf.

Eight of the fourteen cars then in service (5, 6, and 9 to 14BS) were moved across to standard gauge in 1962, becoming 2VAC, 1VAC, 4VFS, 1VFS, 2VFS, 1VFX, 2VFX, and 3VFS respectively. The VAC cars were converted to a sleeping car interior; the VFS and VFX cars were largely unchanged, though two compartments in the VFX cars were reserved for staff. In 1964 3 and 4VFS each had a single compartment (second from the men's end) cleared out and converted to a supplementary food servery, to handle overflow from the buffet cars. These were renumbered 1VFR and 2VFR respectively.

In 1966, 2BS and 3BS became MBS "mini buffet" cars 1 and 2, with three compartments and one of the toilets removed to make way for a medium-sized food serving area. They were joined by 3MBS (ex 9AS, ex 3ABS) in 1968. As such, by 1970 there were only four BS carriages in service – 1, 4, 7, and 8.

2ABS (ex 13AS) was converted to 15BS in 1972.

In 1977, 1BS and 4BS became 2MRS and 1MRS respectively; these cars were similar to the MBS conversions but with five compartments removed instead of three. At the same time the two VAC sleepers, 1 and 2 (ex 6BS and 5BS) became Sleepers 15 and 16 on broad gauge.

In the early 1980s, mass changes were made in the then-V/Line fleet, with many of the changes overlapping. 7BS became BRS224 in 1983, while 8BS was renumbered BS208, and 15BS became the second 12BS, later 212BS. At the same time eight AS cars were converted to BS, taking open number slots 1, 2, 3, and 7, shortly after renumbered BS201, 202, 203, and 207, and joined by direct converts BS204, 205, 209, and 211. Additionally, 1MBS (ex 2BS) was modified and reclassed 13BS, later BS213. As such, six BS identities – 1, 2, 3, 7, 12, and 13 – have been used by two different cars each. At the same time, 1MRS, 2MRS, and 2MBS (ex 4BS, 1BS, and 3BS) became BRS225 to 227. Sleepers No. 15 and No. 16 were re-classed SS285 and SS286.

Changes were also applied to the remaining standard gauge fleet converted from BS cars. 1VFR and 1VFS were returned to broad gauge and converted to 10 and 8BRS, later BRS230 and 228 respectively. 2VFS became VFS214, 2VFR became VFR215, and 1 and 2VFX became VFX216 and 217.

In 1990, cars 214 to 217 were moved back to broad gauge as BS214 to BS217, joined by SS285 and SS286 converted to BS218 and BS219.

Overall, cars BS201 to 207 and BS209 to 212 were originally AS cars, while BS208 and BS213 to 219 were originally BS cars (and of those, 214 to 219 had all operated on standard gauge).

Under the New Deal, the BS cars were used in most long-distance loco-hauled sets, with one or two mixed in with BRS, BZ, BCZ, AZ, and ACZ cars to give three, four, or five carriage sets. From 1993 many of those regional sets were rendered obsolete, as the Sprinter railcars entered service. BS203, 205, and 207 were initially leased to West Coast Railway, and in April 1995 they were sold to WCR following that railway being allowed to run its own trains. By October 1995 they had been joined by BS201, BS208, BS210, and BS212.

The original plan for V/Line circa 1993 was to hold the leased BS cars for West Coast and a handful for themselves, and to sell off the remaining cars. Cars BS213 and BS214, (ex 2BS and 11BS) were sold to Steamrail Victoria and the Seymour Railway Heritage Centre respectively, and both restored to their original liveries and identities.

When V/Line Passenger was incorporated, their stock register included BS212 and BS215 to 219, though BS212 was quickly sold to West Coast Railway following a derailment at Werribee in 1995. The remaining cars were stored pending a future decision. After some of the Sprinter railcars were damaged in collisions in the early 1990s (one of them, 7019, was scrapped), the five remaining BS cars were pressed back into service. They were initially mixed in with the remaining Z sets until 2006, then later formed their own set initially with ACN21 (ex set N7) forming set SN7 in 2007, and later with BCZ257 in set Z57/SZ7, when a patronage spike demanded the extra cars be retained. These cars were stored again from 2010, and in 2017 they were sold with three going to the Seymour Railway Heritage Centre, one to 707 Operations, and the fifth used as a spare parts supply for both organisations.

West Coast Railway ceased operations in 2004, and their fleet was dispersed. Their only pure BS car, BS208 (ex 8BS) was sold to Queensland Rail (since rebranded Aurizon) and converted to crew car QBCY8R. BRS224 (ex 7BS) was restored to that identity and sold to 707 Operations, and now runs in a livery scheme with the name Williamstown applied to the side. 707 Operations also acquired BS212, and retained its West Coast Railway livery until 2021. BRS225 (ex 4BS) was sold to Pacific National, and now operates as a crew car.

==== BRS ====
Partial Buffet Cars
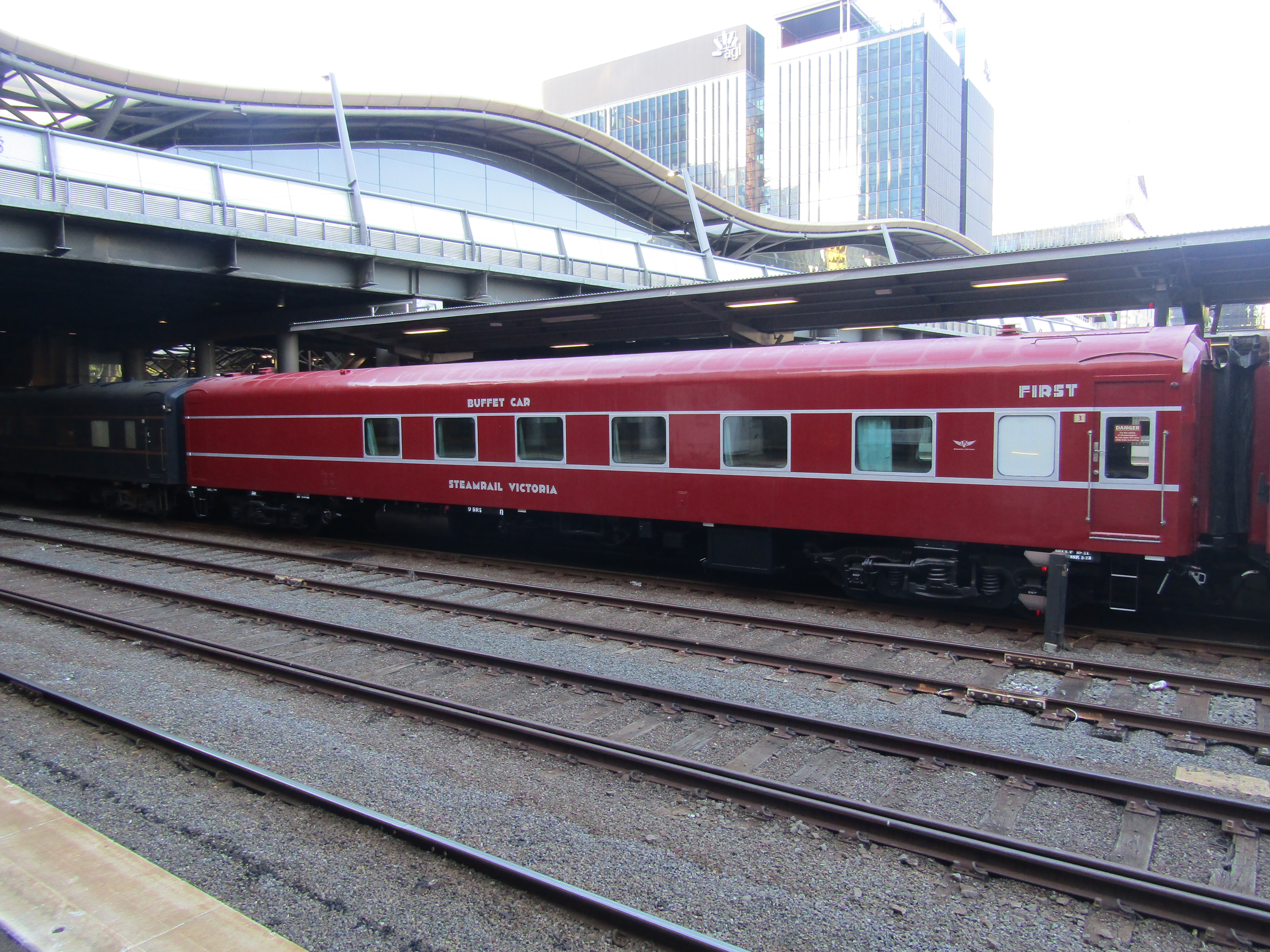
- 9BRS as preserved by Steamrail Victoria
- Constructed: 1938-1985
- Number built: 13 shells
- Number preserved: 3
- Design code: MBS, MRS & BRS (broad gauge); VFR (standard gauge)
- Fleet numbers: Tanjil (Buffet Car No.4); Moorabool (Buffet Car No. 5); 1 & 2 VFR; VFR215; 1-3MBS; 1-2MRS; 1-3 & 8-10BRS; BRS221-230
- Capacity: 12 1st class passengers & 19 diners (Buffet Cars 4 & 5); 56 2nd class passengers (VFR); 40 2nd class passengers & 12 diners (MBS); 24 2nd class passengers & 12 diners (MRS); 48 2nd class passengers (BRS)

Specifications
- Weight: 49 LT 10 cwt 4 qtr (50.35 t) (Buffet Cars 4 & 5) 44 LT 10 cwt 4 qtr (45.26 t) (VFR) 46 LT 2 cwt 0 qtr (46.84 t) (BRS, MBS & MRS)
- Axle load: 12 LT 7 cwt 3 qtr (12.59 t) (Buffet Cars 4 & 5) 11 LT 2 cwt 3 qtr (11.32 t) (VFR) 11 LT 10 cwt 2 qtr (11.71 t) (BRS, MBS & MRS)

Nine of the ten BRS cars were converted from various AS and BS cars during 1983, followed by 2MRS to BRS226 in April 1984. The cars had six of the eight original compartments set up for second class passengers, with capacity for 48. Two compartments and a toilet were removed and replaced with a short buffet counter, similar to that provided in the BRN cars. The first six converted were given numbers 1, 2, 3, 8, 9, and 10, because the New Deal numbering concept had not yet been developed. Those cars all had 220 added to their identities, and the final four converts entered service as 224 to 227, giving a final fleet of BRS221 to BRS230.

Respectively, the ten cars had been converted from 6AS, 16AS, 12AS (ex 1ABS), 7BS (the first), 1MRS (ex 4BS), 2MRS (ex the first 1BS), 2MBS (ex 3BS), 1VFS from standard gauge (ex 10BS), 3MBS (ex 9AS/3ABS), and 1VFR (ex 3VFS/14BS).

Under the New Deal, the BRS cars were used in most long-distance loco-hauled sets, with one or two mixed in with BS, BZ, BCZ, AZ, and ACZ cars to give three, four or five carriage sets. From 1993 those regional sets were rendered surplus, as the Sprinter railcars entered service. BRS221, 222, 224, and 225 were initially leased to West Coast Railway, and in April 1995 they were sold to WCR following that railway being allowed to run its own trains. By October 1995 they had been joined by BRS223 (replacing BRS222, damaged at Werribee) and BRS229.

That left V/Line with BRS cars 226, 227, 228, and 230. In 1994 BRS228 was reconfigured as a staff car and named Mitta Mitta to replace Goulburn, and painted in the V/Line corporate livery of grey with white, and orange and green bands above the window line. Mitta Mitta was subsequently obtained by Seymour Railway Heritage Centre and painted Blue & Gold. BRS230 was restored to its original number but not class, and now runs as 14BRS with Steamrail Victoria. 226BRS was sold to Seymour Railway Heritage Centre, painted in blue and yellow, and now operates as 1BS (converted 1997); 227BRS was sold to Great Southern Railway Society, and renumbered 3BS. SRHC leased 1BS to National Rail for radio testing in December 1997, and it travelled extensively on standard gauge, returning to Seymour in April 1998.

West Coast Railway ceased operations in 2004, and their fleet was dispersed. BRS221, 222, 223, and 225 (ex 6AS, 16AS, 12AS, and 4BS) were sold to Pacific National for use as crew cars. BRS224 (ex 7BS) was painted in red with the name Williamstown applied to the sides and now operates with 707 operations, while BRS229 was renumbered an unorthodox 9BRS and painted in red and silver by Steamrail Victoria.

=== Sleeping cars ===
Sleeping Cars
- Constructed: 1962
- Fleet numbers: 1VAC / Sleeper No. 15 / SS285 & 2VAC / Sleeper No. 16 / SS286

Specifications
- Doors: inside-swinging, four corners
- Weight: 52 LT 8 cwt 0 qtr (53.24 t)
- Axle load: 13 LT 2 cwt 0 qtr (13.31 t)

To provide for the Spirit of Progress's conversion to Standard Gauge from 1962, two of the BS class carriages were converted to composite sitting/sleeping cars, for the run from Melbourne to Canberra.

6BS became 1VAC, and 5BS became 2VAC. One car was attached to each train (with 1VAM as a spare). From the No. 1 end, compartment 1 was left unaltered and compartment 2 was converted to first class accommodation, with six seats in place of eight and additional armrests. The remaining six compartments were cleared out, and every second interior wall was removed. Compartment pairs 3 & 4, 5 & 6, and 7 & 8 had their separation walls shifted, so that each compartment could sit three or sleep two passengers, with wardrobes taking up the remaining space. The three-seat assembly at the outer wall of each compartment pair could fold down to provide one bed, while the other was permanently in-situ. Each car had a capacity of 8 second- and 24 first-class passengers in daytime, or 8 second-, 6 first-class, and 12 sleeping passengers at night.

Compartments 1 and 2 were refitted to the same pattern as the rest circa 1977, giving a capacity of 24 sitting passengers, or a night time capacity of 16 passengers.

In 1978, the two cars were returned to broad gauge, and took on the numbers No. 15 Sleeper (ex 1VAC) and No. 16 Sleeper (ex 2VAC) following on from Sleepers 1 to 10 (ex E type carriages) and Sleepers 11 to 14 (ex V&SAR Overland Carriages), for operation on The Vinelander service to Mildura. By 1982 they had been internally refitted as full sleeping carriages, rather than composite sitting/sleeping as they had been for standard gauge service.

In late 1984 and early 1985, the two were renumbered SS285 and SS286 in line with the New Deal numbering system. When The Vinelander sleeping car service started winding down in the late 80s/early 90s, the cars were converted back to their original BS format, as BS218 and BS219.

=== Dining car (Murray) ===
Dining Car
- Constructed: 1937
- Number built: 1
- Number preserved: 1
- Fleet numbers: Dining Car / Murray / RS236
- Capacity: 48 dining passengers

Specifications
- Weight: 52 LT 14 cwt 0 qtr (53.55 t)
- Axle load: 13 LT 3 cwt 2 qtr (13.39 t)

The original Dining Car built for the Spirit of Progress train entered service on 17 November 1937. This car had six tables either side of the central aisle in the dining saloon, and each of those could sit four, for a total capacity of 48 diners at any time. Given that the maximum-capacity Spirit of Progress set had capacity for over 400 passengers, so only a handful of them could be provided with the full dinner service in the short runtime.

The car was renamed Murray in 1963.

In September 1989, the car was repainted to V/Line's corporate livery of grey with white, and thin orange and green bands above the windows. It was repainted again at Seymour in November 1995 to the then-new V/Line Passenger livery, with all-over red, a blue roof and a white stripe in line with the corporate logo; the car did not receive the later version of the scheme with the white stripe at window-height. Later, it was painted in a "heritage" livery, with dark red as the base and yellow lining and dots to simulate the look of the original livery as applied to the AVE and BVE cars; and by 2007 it had been returned to the Victorian Railways scheme, though with yellow painted stripes in lieu of gold leaf.

=== Buffet cars ===
Full Buffet Cars
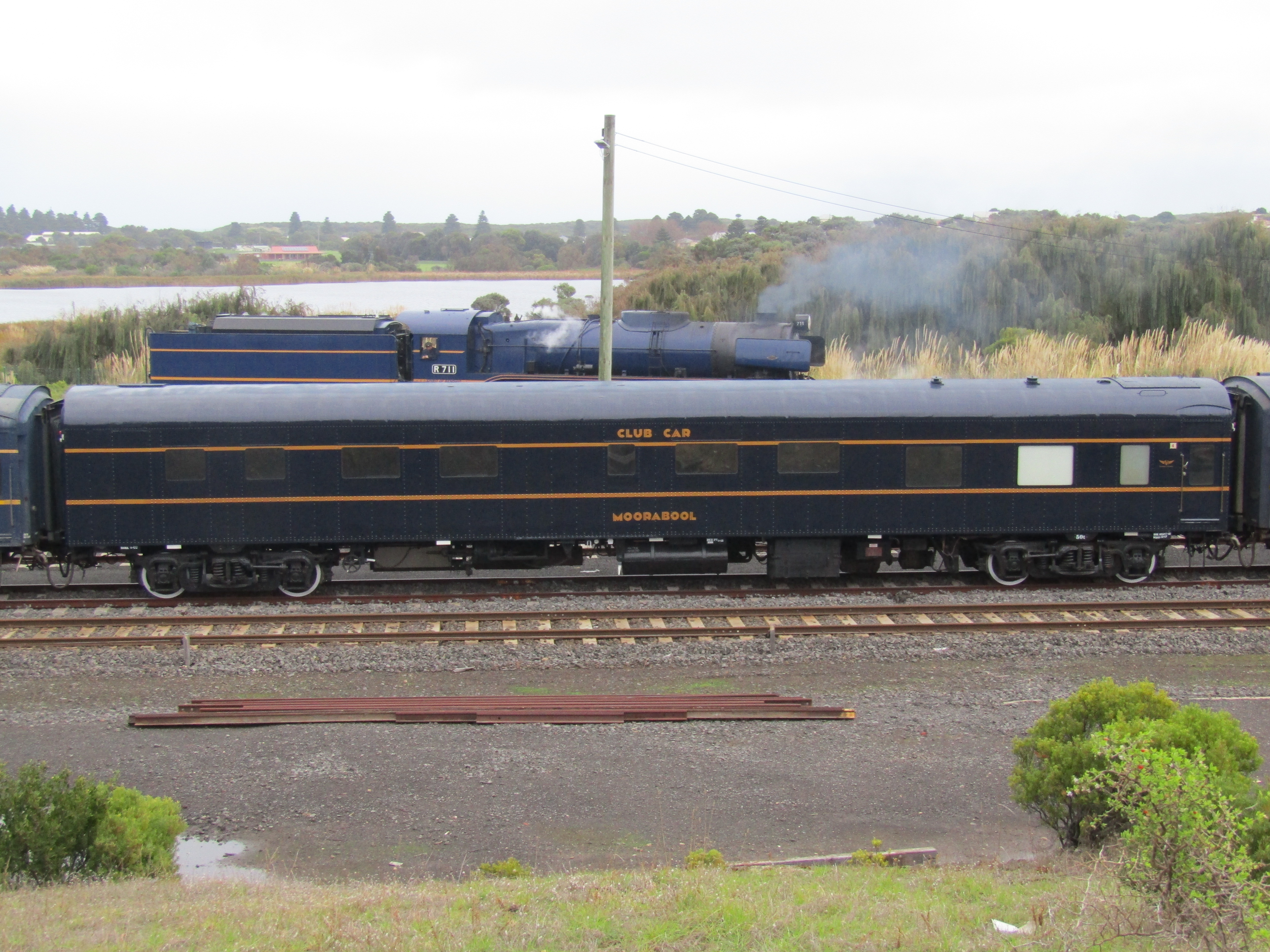
- Moorabool as preserved by Steamrail Victoria

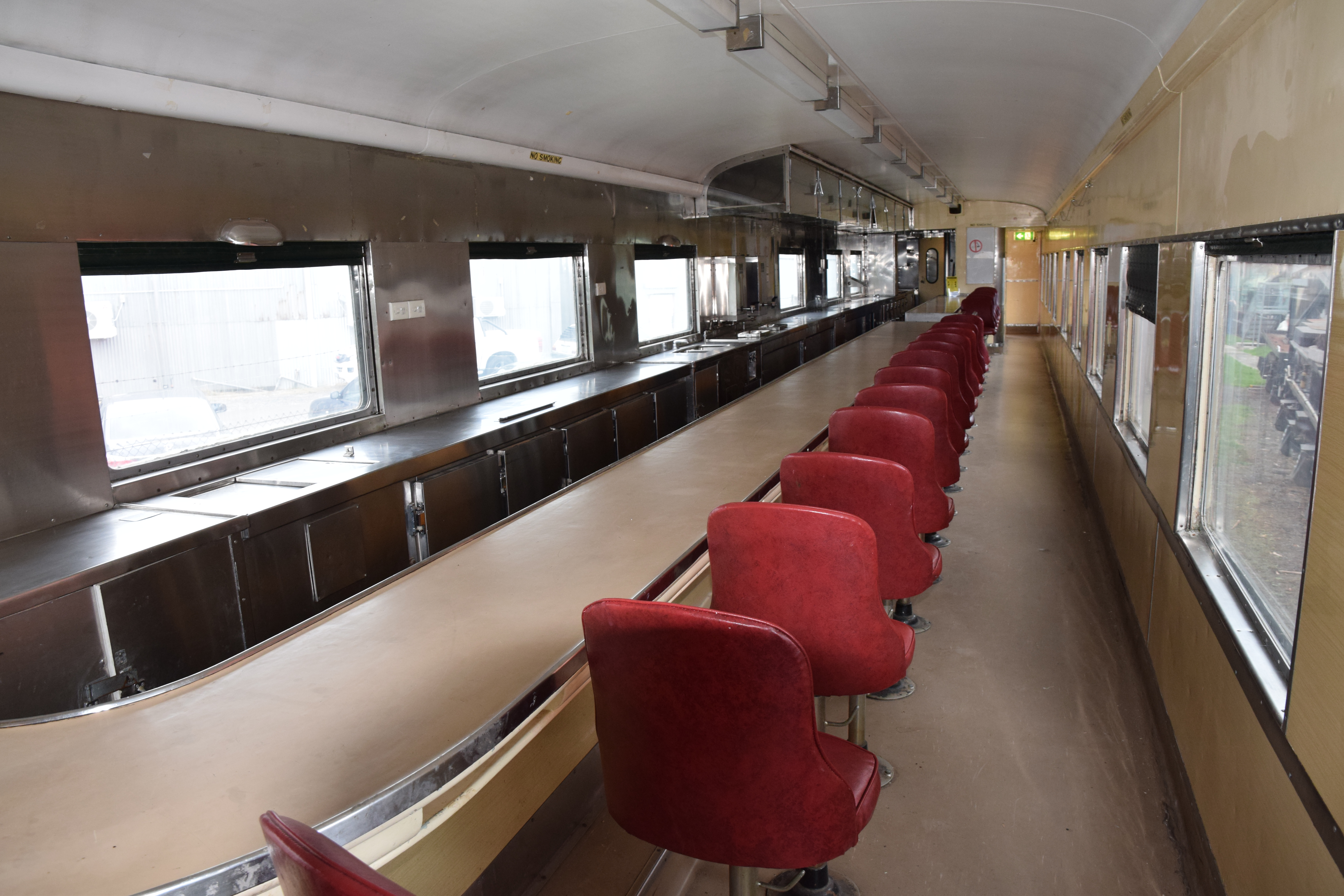
- Interior of Mitta Mitta at the Newport Railway Museum
- Constructed: 1938-1963
- Number built: 4
- Fleet numbers: Wimmera (Buffet Car No. 3), Mitta Mitta (Buffet Car No. 2), 1-3VRS, VRS231-233, RS234
- Capacity: 27 eating passengers (Buffet Car No. 2 / Wimmera / 2VRS / VRS232 & Buffet Car No. 3 & Mitta Mitta / 1VRS / VRS231); 28 eating passengers (3VRS / 233VRS); open room with portable furniture (Moorabool / RS234)

Specifications
- Weight: 51 LT 12 cwt 0 qtr (52.43 t)
- Axle load: 12 LT 18 cwt 0 qtr (13.11 t)

The buffet cars were initially allocated to longer-distance passenger services around Victoria. The four cars, plus E type carriage Taggerty, were used to provide lunch and dinner services on trains that needed to run express, and so couldn't afford to make stops at Railway Refreshment Rooms. These trains also generally used more powerful locomotives, which did not require the additional stops for refuelling and could handle the extra weight of the buffet cars. When they entered service the cars were painted red, to match the timber stock then in use on most trains, with a silver band to indicate their higher level of service.

==== Wimmera & Mitta Mitta ====
These two cars originally entered service on The Overland between Melbourne and Serviceton. The cars were fitted with a long counter serving 27 eating passengers taking up most of the car length, with the remainder of the area used as a small kitchen. No side doors were provided except for kitchen staff; passengers were expected to walk through the train to access the car's facilities. From 1945 the cars were transferred to run alternate journeys on the Albury Express run.

==== Tanjil & Moorabool ====
These two cars entered service on the Warrnambool and Horsham daily trains. As the roster included some stops at stations with refreshment facilities less onboard capacity was required, so the benches were reduced to only 19 eating passengers and the remainder of the car length was used for regular first-class compartments, as provided in AS-class sitting carriages. That end of the car was fitted with a vestibule and external passenger doors both sides. The cars were stored at Newport Workshops during the second world war, as onboard catering services were not practical with limited fuel and locomotive resources. After the war Tanjil ran on The Gippslander and Moorabool was a spare retained at the Spencer Street dining car depot; by 1952 these allocations had reversed.

In 1962 Tanjil was modified to internally match Wimmera and Mitta Mitta (though with 28 seats spaced slightly closer). All three were transferred across to standard gauge to provide onboard catering facilities for the new standard gauge Spirit of Progress, and became 1, 2, and 3VRS.

Moorabool was retained on the broad gauge system for The Gippslander until the mid-1980s, when it was withdrawn in lieu of BRN cars in fixed N sets. It was then reallocated to the Train of Knowledge.

=== Parlor car (Lounge Car, Club Car, Norman) ===
Parlor Car / Norman
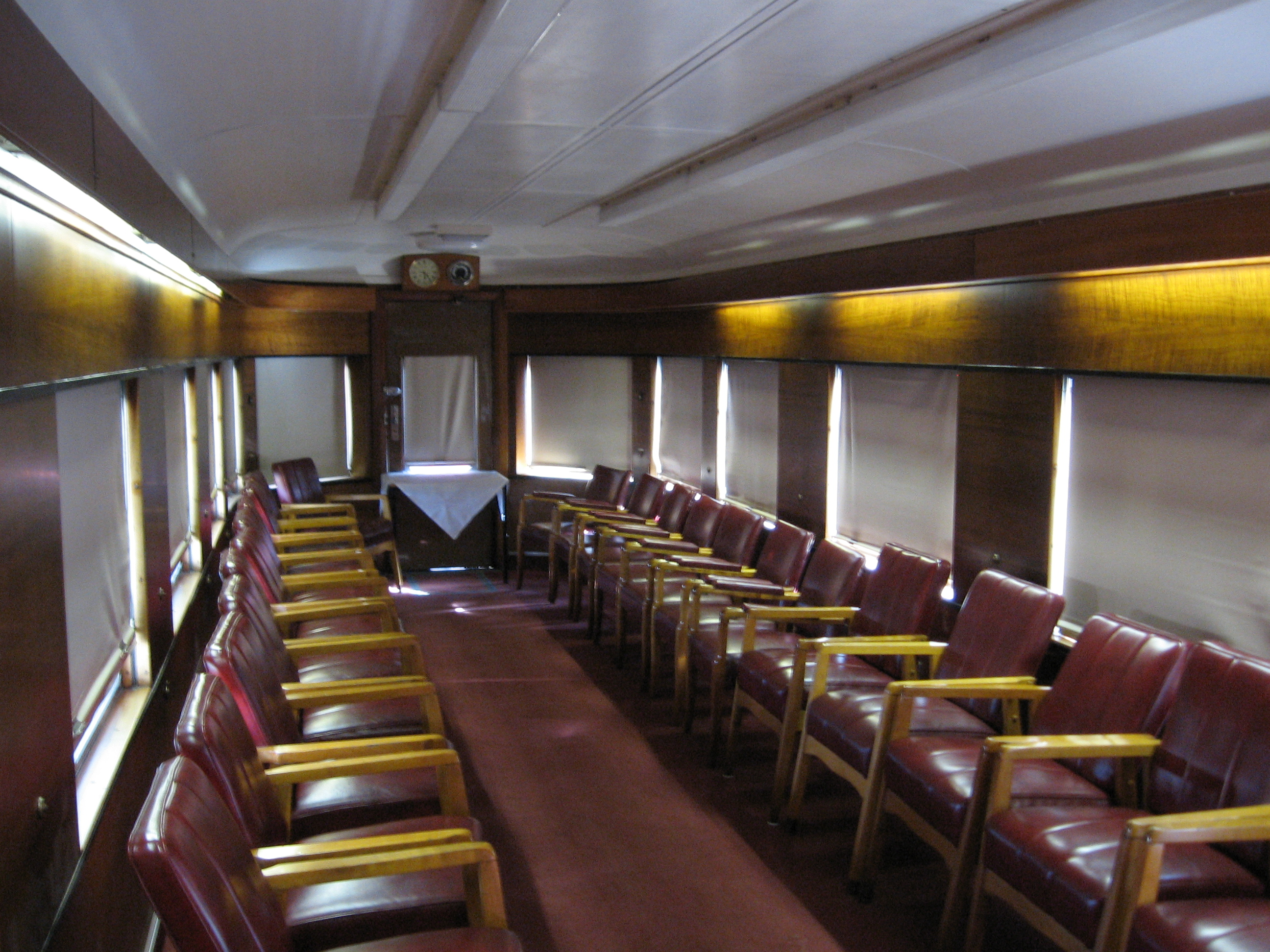
- Interior of the Parlor Car in its present-day configuration
- Constructed: 1937
- Number built: 1
- Number preserved: 1
- Fleet numbers: Parlor Car / Lounge Car / Club Car / Norman / RS237 / OS237
- Capacity: 33 as Parlor Car and Lounge Car, later 38 as Club Car38 passengers (Parlor, Lounge, Club formats); 25 (Norman / OS237 format)

Specifications
- Weight: 52 LT 0 cwt 0 qtr (52.83 t), later 52 LT 15 cwt 0 qtr (53.60 t) as Norman
- Axle load: 13 LT 0 cwt 0 qtr (13.21 t), later 13 LT 3 cwt 3 qtr (13.40 t) as Norman

The Parlor car was built as the final carriage in the Spirit of Progress consist. It entered service on 17 November 1937, in a royal blue scheme with two gold-leaf bands. Originally the car was planned to have flat ends, like the rest of the fleet. Later, the design was altered to provide for the rounded end, allowing for better views from the rear of the train. To ensure that the car was at the rear of the train on every run, the whole Spirit of Progress consist was reversed in the North Melbourne Reversing Loop in Melbourne, and on the triangle between Wodonga, Coal Sidings and Bandiana near Albury. This train, along with the wooden Albury Express with cars Yarra and Murray, were the only trains in Victoria where the guard was permitted to travel in a van adjacent to the locomotive, rather than in the rear carriage.

The interior arrangement of the car included a small 8 ft (2.44 m) conductor's compartment with doors both sides, then two 4 ft 3 in (1.30 m) bathrooms, then a 3 ft 6 in (1.07 m) corridor, followed by a 20 ft 7/8 in (6.12 m) smoking compartment for 13 passengers, and finally the round-ended observation compartment at 30 ft 4 in (9.25 m) with room for 20 seats.

In March 1956, a new Daylight Express was introduced between Melbourne and Sydney (with passengers changing trains at Albury), including an assortment of AS, BS, and AZ and BZ sitting carriages, and one of the S type buffet cars. In April 1957 the car was moved from the Spirit of Progress across to the Daylight train, allowing passengers to better enjoy the view form the rear carriage. It was renamed the Lounge Car for the new duty.

On 13 May 1958, the car was rebuilt internally. The conductor compartment was reallocated as the guard compartment, and all the seating was rearranged. The former smoking saloon was cleared out and replaced with a small buffet, plus five semicircle tables against the walls of the carriage and 12 loose chairs provided. The seats in the observation compartment were removed and replaced with AZ reclining and rotating seat pairs, with six units per side and two final couch seats either side of the flower table against the rear window. In this form, the rear lettering "SPIRIT OF PROGRESS" was replaced with "THE DAYLIGHT", but it is not clear whether the lettering was gold leaf, gold paint, or yellow paint. The Lounge Car remained allocated to "THE DAYLIGHT" until it switched to a standard gauge service on 21 April 1962.

After the full introduction of the standard gauge passenger service, new lounge cars were provided on the new premier train, the Southern Aurora, but the Spirit of Progress was down-rated to the second-tier service and it was not provided with any such service. The Club Car was rendered obsolete in that sense, so the car was returned to Newport Workshops and rebuilt again. It re-entered service on 21 March 1963, renamed Norman. The name and purpose had been recycled from the previous carriage, which had been reserved for use by railway officials on inspection tours around the state, and other high-profile events. The car was extensively rebuilt for the new purpose; a flexible diaphragm was fitted to the flat end in lieu of the full-width, collapsible steel-plated diaphragm, which had been intended to make the Spirit of Progress train look like one unit rather than individual carriages. End windows were cut into the body at that end either side of the doorway. An additional door was also cut into the rounded end of the carriage, allowing access/egress when the carriage was parked in a railmotor dock or similar; and both ends were fitted with external marker lights above the roofline and at around waist height. Internally the car was gutted and nearly everything was replaced. The flat end was refitted with a small 11 ft 2.6875 in (3.42 m) office/meeting area with four individual seats provided, replacing the former guard compartment and male bathroom. The ladies' bathroom was retained and made unisex. A 14 ft 9.5 in (4.51 m) kitchen area with buffet counter was fitted over where the former buffet and semicircle tables were placed, and expanding somewhat into the observation saloon. That saloon was fitted with a central table of 17 ft (5.18 m), surrounded with 21 seats. The three windows adjacent to the kitchen were partially filled in, allowing for a higher cooking surface.

The car had its axle-mounted generator system replaced with head-end power connections in 1977.

In the New Deal, the car was allocated the identity of OS237, and this was officially used from October 1985; though the name Norman was still in use. The car was repainted to the V/Line Corporate livery of white and grey with orange and green stripes above the windowline, for the 1988 royal tour. The code was rescinded in October 1995, when the car was allocated to V/Line Passenger. It was then repainted in an early version of the V/Line Passenger livery, with an all-over red body, white window frames, and a blue roof separated from the body with a thin white line . Then, around 2000, the car was repainted into a facsimile of the original E type carriage scheme, with a dark red body outlined with yellow lines and dots.

The car was allocated to the Seymour Railway Heritage Centre in early 2007, and repainted into blue and gold in November 2007.

=== Guards van ===
Vans
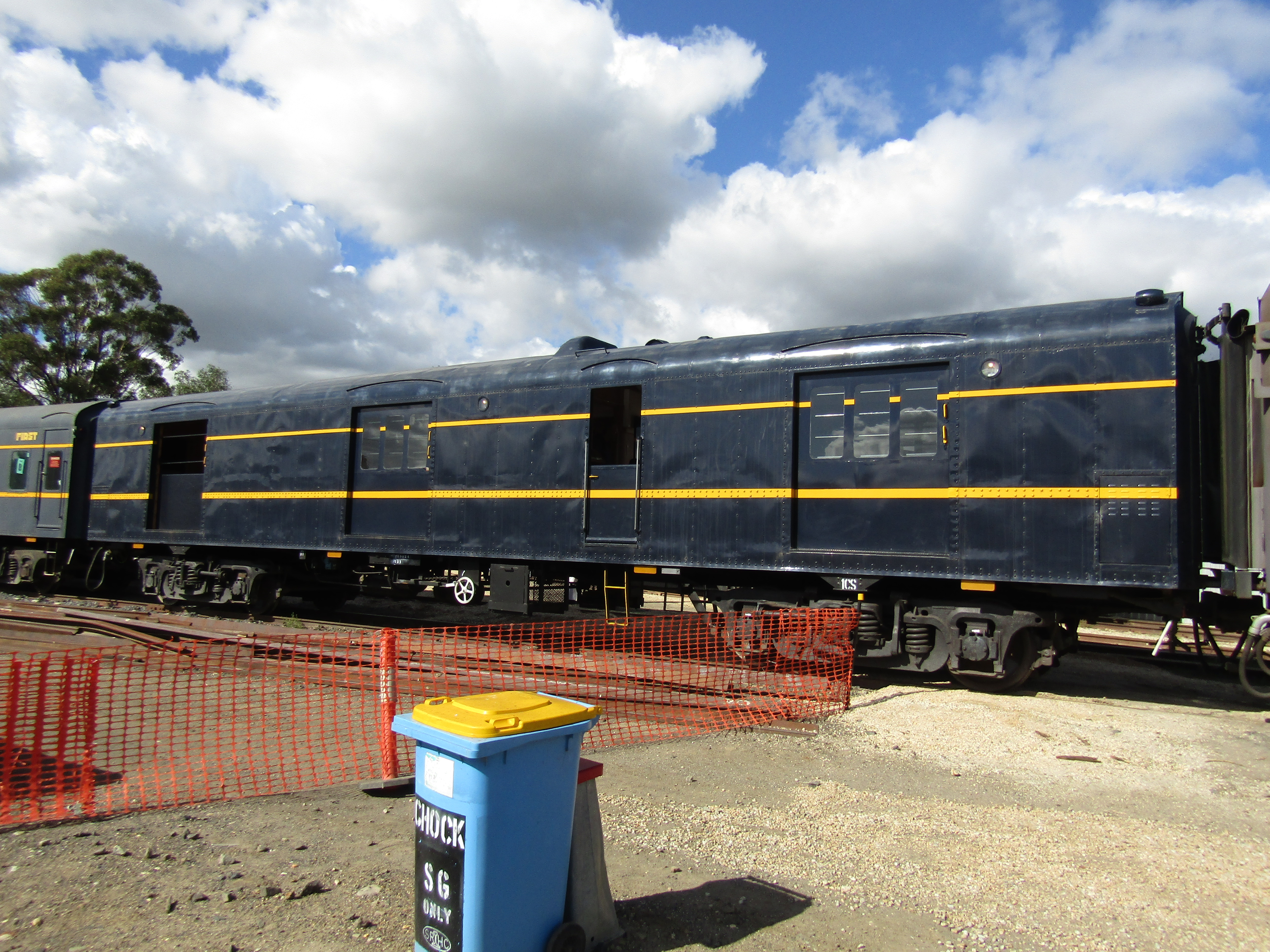
- 1 CS as preserved by the Seymour Railway Heritage Centre
- Constructed: 1937-1938
- Number built: 2
- Number preserved: 1
- Number scrapped: 1
- Design code: Steel CE / CS; Steel Bulk Mail / DS; VHN; P.T.C. Test Car
- Fleet numbers: 1CS / 1VHN / VHN241 / CS241 & 1DS / 2CS / 2VHN
- Capacity: 20 long tons (20.32 t) (CS & VHN); 25 long tons (25.40 t) (DS)

Specifications
- Doors: 4 per side (CS & VHN); 3 per side (DS)
- Weight: 38 LT 14 cwt 0 qtr (39.32 t) (CS, unloaded)
- Axle load: 9 LT 13 cwt 2 qtr (9.83 t) (CS, unloaded)

=== State Car 5 ===
State Car No. 5
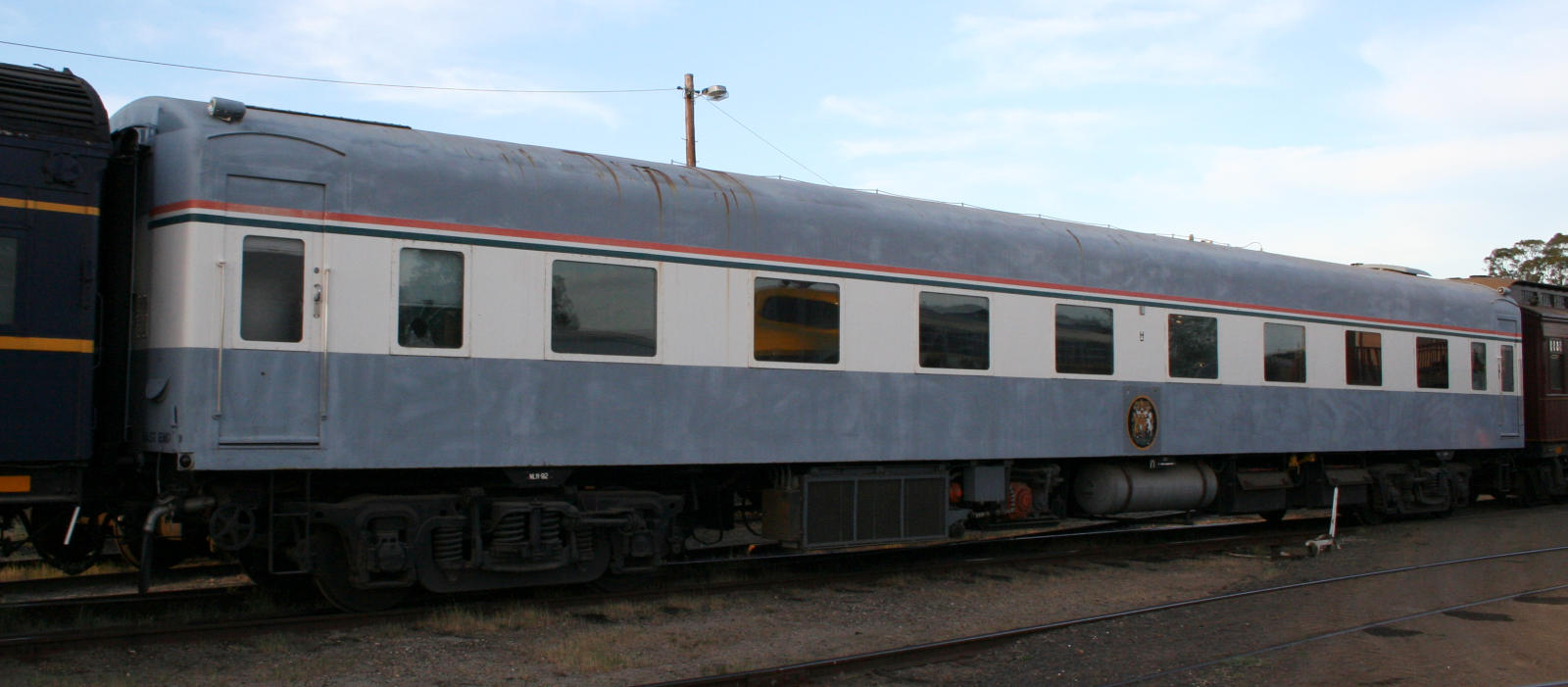
- State Car No.5 prior to restoration by Seymour Railway Heritage Centre
- Constructed: 1951
- Number built: 1
- Number preserved: 1
- Design code: State Car
- Fleet numbers: 5

Specifications
- Weight: 52 LT 12 cwt 0 qtr (53.44 t)
- Axle load: 13 LT 3 cwt 0 qtr (13.36 t)

=== Staff Car ===
Staff Car
- Constructed: 1994
- Number built: 1
- Number preserved: 1
- Fleet numbers: BRS228 / Mitta Mitta
- Capacity: 6 beds, 8 seats & four dining chairs

Specifications
- Doors: inside-swinging, four corners
- Weight: 44 LT 0 cwt 0 qtr (44.71 t)
- Axle load: 11 LT 0 cwt 0 qtr (11.18 t)
