= Lake Narracan =

Dam and reservoir in Victoria, Australia

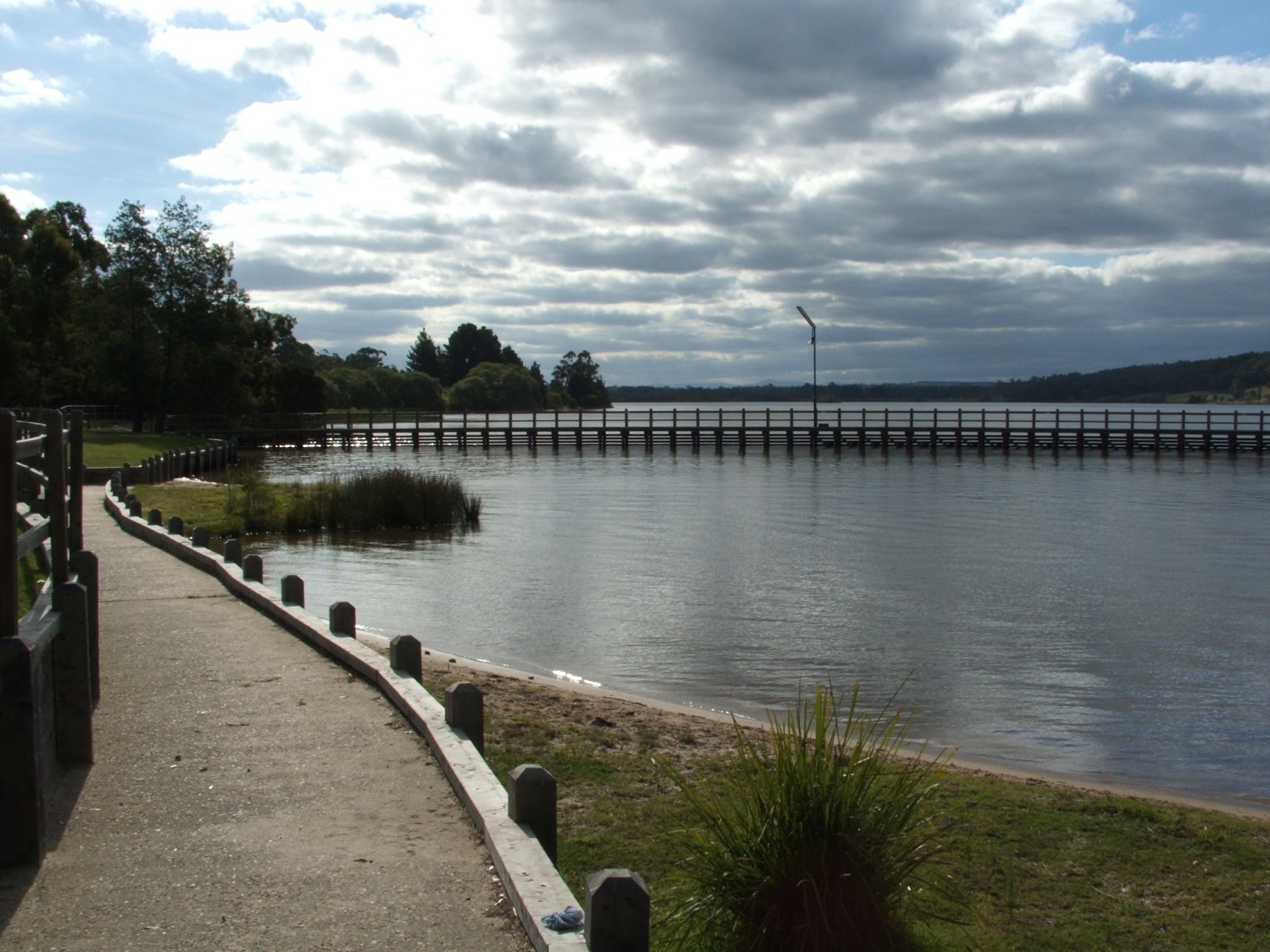
- The reservoir, 2005

- Location of the reservoir in Victoria
- Interactive map of Lake Narracan
- Country: Australia
- Location: Gippsland, Victoria
- Coordinates: 38°9′30″S 146°19′0″E
- Purpose: Industrial water supply
- Status: Operational
- Construction began: 1959
- Opening date: 1961
- Built by: State Electricity Commission of Victoria
- Operator: Southern Rural Water

Dam and spillways
- Type of dam: Gravity dam
- Impounds: Latrobe River
- Height: 23 m (75 ft)
- Length: 109 m (358 ft)
- Spillways: 1
- Spillway type: Controlled vertical lift gates (x4) with penstock

Reservoir
- Creates: Lake Narracan
- Total capacity: 7,230 ML (5,860 acre⋅ft)
- Catchment area: 1,942 km^{2} (750 sq mi)
- Surface area: 281 ha (690 acres)
- Website srw.com.au

Lake Narracan is a reservoir formed by a gravity dam across the Latrobe River, located near Newborough, in the Latrobe Valley, in the Gippsland region of Victoria, Australia. Completed in 1961, the reservoir was built to supply cooling water for the nearby brown coal–fired power stations.

== Dam and reservoir overview ==
=== Dam ===
The concrete gravity dam wall is situated approximately 1.5 kilometres (0.93 mi) upstream of the Yallourn Power Station, 10 kilometres (6.2 mi) east of Moe. Its upper reaches are approximately 6 kilometres (3.7 mi) further to the west, close to the confluence of the Narracan Creek with the Latrobe River. Formerly called the Yallourn Storage Dam, the dam was constructed by the State Electricity Commission of Victoria between 1959 and 1961 and, when full, the reservoir has capacity of 7,230 megalitres (5,860 acre⋅ft). The controlled four vertical lift gates, with a penstock gate were upgraded in 2002, including anchoring the dam wall to the foundation bedrock and strengthening the gates. The reservoir supplies water for cooling the generators of the power stations in the Latrobe Valley. This supply is supplemented with water from the Blue Rock Dam, approximately 15 kilometres (9.3 mi) upstream on the Tanjil River.

=== Reservoir ===
Lake Narracan is the largest industrial reservoir in Victoria that does not serve to supply potable water for domestic use. In addition to its industrial use, the reservoir is used for recreational purposes, including waterskiing, jet skiing, swimming, recreational fishing, and bush walking on the shore. A school camp (Woorabinda), on the northern shore of the lake, offers facilities for approximately 75 people. On the southern shore there is a caravan park and campground. The Moe Golf Club is also located on the southern shore, with a number of holes overlooking Lake Narracan.

The Latrobe Valley Model Aero Club is also located on the lake shore. The Hovercraft Club of Victoria uses the west end of the lake. The Moe-Yallourn Rail Trail passes close by the southern shore of the lake and the Halls Bay Loop track was installed connecting the Rail Trail with South Shore Road.

== See also ==
- List of power stations in Victoria
- List of reservoirs and dams in Victoria
