= Latrobe River =

River in Victoria, Australia

Latrobe La Trobe, LaTrobe
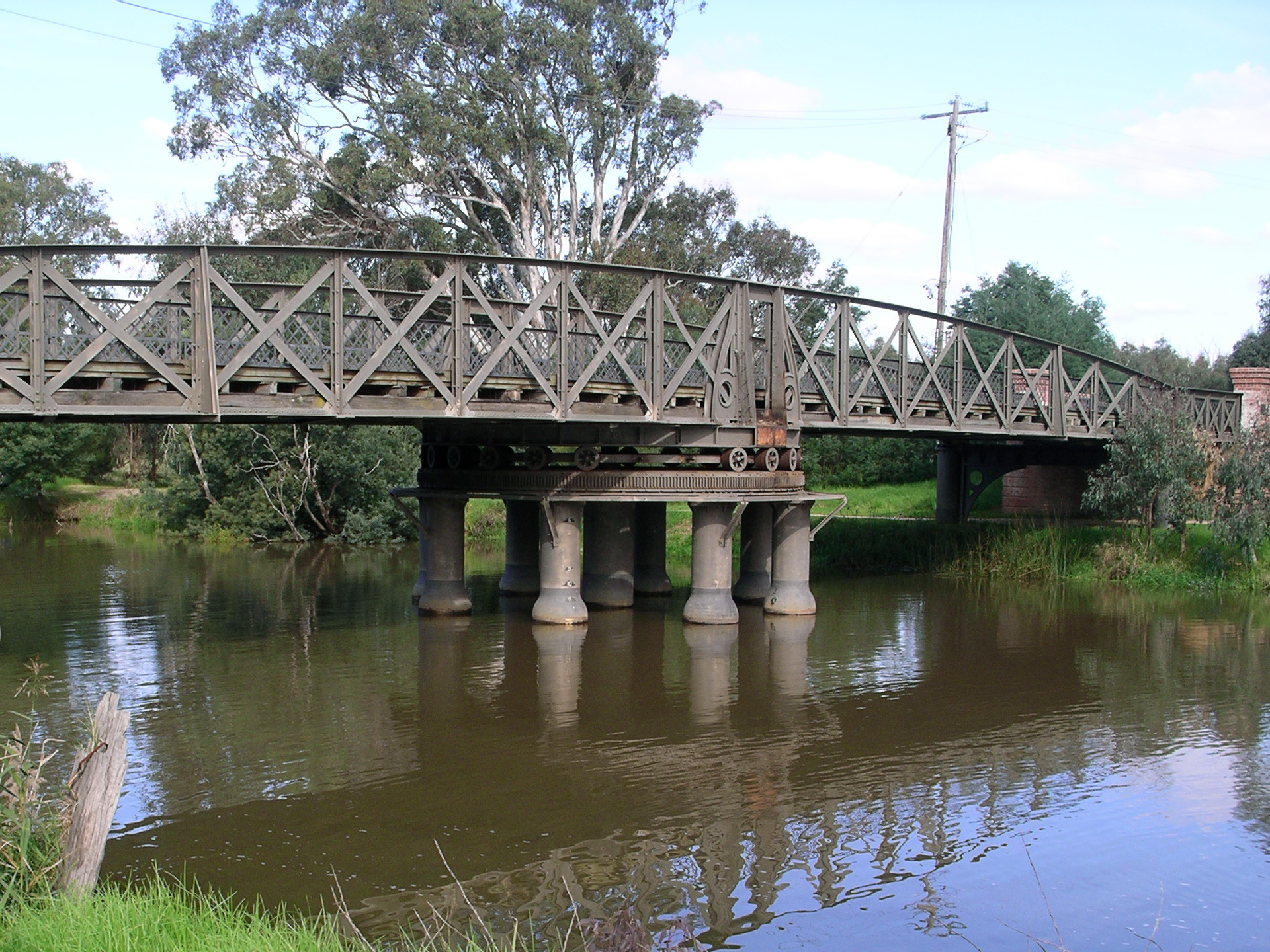
- The Sale Swing Bridge over the Latrobe River

- Location of the Latrobe River mouth in Victoria
- Etymology: In honour of Charles La Trobe, Lieutenant Governor of the Port Phillip District.
- Native name: Durt'yowan (Kurnai)

Location
- Country: Australia
- State: Victoria
- Region: South East Coastal Plain (IBRA), West Gippsland
- Local government areas: Baw Baw, Wellington, East Gippsland

Physical characteristics
- Source: Baw Baw plateau, Great Dividing Range
  - location: below Dick Hill, near Noojee
  - coordinates: 37°49′33″S 145°47′39″E
  - elevation: 764 m (2,507 ft)
- Mouth: Lake Wellington
  - location: east of Sale
  - coordinates: 37°54′11″S 147°37′20″E
  - elevation: 1 m (3 ft 3 in)
- Length: 270 km (170 mi)

Basin features
- River system: West Gippsland catchment
- Tributaries
  - left: Pioneer Creek, Ada River, Toorongo River, Loch River, Hawthorn Creek, Tanjil River, Anderson Creek, Tyers River, Rintoul Creek, Eaglehawk Creek, Thomson River, Avon River
  - right: Bennie Creek, Morwell River, Wade Creek, Traralgon Creek, Flynns Creek
- National parks: The Lakes NP, Gippsland Lakes CP

The Latrobe River (or sometimes La Trobe or LaTrobe) is a perennial river of the West Gippsland catchment, in the West Gippsland region of the Australian state of Victoria. The Latrobe River and its associated sub-catchment is an important source for the Gippsland Lakes, draining the south eastern slopes of the Great Dividing Range.

== Course and features ==
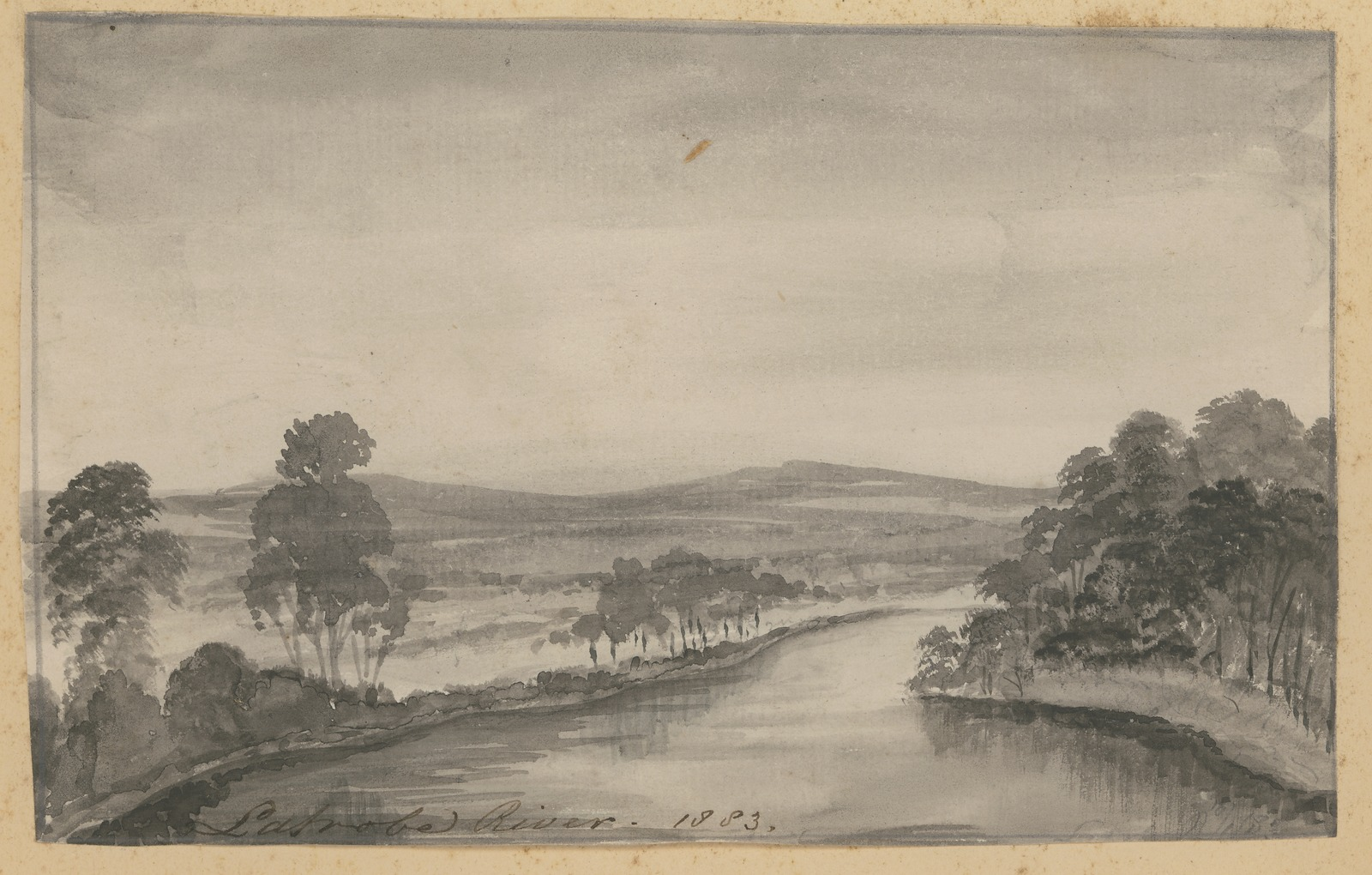
Latrobe River, 1883

The Latrobe River rises below Dick Hill, from the southern slopes of the Baw Baw plateau, part of the Great Dividing Range, between Powelltown and Noojee where it shares a watershed with the Little Yarra River, in a state forestry area. The river flows generally in an easterly direction, then south, and then east again through the Latrobe Valley, joined by seventeen tributaries including the Ada, Toorongo, Loch, Tanjil, Morwell, Tyers, and Thomson rivers, before reaching its mouth in Lake Wellington east of Sale where it forms its confluence with the Avon. It then goes to flow out of Lake Wellington and into Lake Victoria, Within Lake Victoria, south of Bairnsdale, the river forms its confluence with the Forge Creek and Mitchell River and empties into Bass Strait southwest of Lakes Entrance in the Shire of East Gippsland. The river descends 764 metres (2,507 ft) over its 270-kilometre (170 mi) course.

The Latrobe River flows through Lake Narracan, a storage reservoir near Newborough built to supply cooling water for the nearby brown coal fired power stations, and through Lake Victoria before emptying into the Bass Strait. In its upper reaches, the Latrobe River flows adjacent to the Noojee Streamside Reserve and the Tyers Streamside Reserve. As the river reaches its mouth, it flows adjacent to The Lakes National Park and the Gippsland Lakes Coastal Park.

Major road crossings of the river, from upstream to downstream, are located on the Yarra Junction-Noojee Road east of Powelltown; the Mount Baw Baw Road east of Noojee; the Willowgrove Road south of Willow Grove; the Moe-Rawson Road north of Moe; the Moe-Glengarry Road west of Yallourn North; and the Princes Highway north of Rosedale.

The Latrobe River sub-catchment area is managed by the West Gippsland Catchment Management Authority.

== Etymology ==
In the Aboriginal Brataualung language the river is given two names, Durt'yowan, meaning "finger", and Tanjil, with no defined meaning.

According to Les Blake, in 1841 William Adams Brodribb, an early settler, named the river in honour of Charles La Trobe, Lieutenant Governor of the Port Phillip District. A. W. Reed also attributes Brodribb to naming the river in honour of La Trobe; yet Reed claims that the river was discovered by Angus McMillan in 1840 who named the watercourse as Glengarry River.

The Australian Government Gazetteer lists the name of the watercourse as La Trobe River and the river is sometimes spelled as LaTrobe River; meanwhile the Victorian Government Registrar of Geographic Names list the name as Latrobe River.

== See also ==
- List of rivers of Australia
