= Ada River (Baw Baw, Victoria) =

River in Victoria, Australia

Ada
- Mouth of the Ada River in Victoria

Location
- Country: Australia
- State: Victoria
- Region: South East Coastal Plain (IBRA), West Gippsland
- Local government area: Shire of Baw Baw

Physical characteristics
- Source: Marney Hill
  - location: northeast of Powelltown
  - coordinates: 37°49′33″S 145°47′39″E
  - elevation: 843 m (2,766 ft)
- Mouth: confluence with the Latrobe River
  - location: west of Noojee
  - coordinates: 37°52′56″S 145°53′43″E
  - elevation: 297 m (974 ft)
- Length: 14 km (8.7 mi)

Basin features
- River system: West Gippsland catchment

The Ada River is a perennial river of the West Gippsland catchment, in the West Gippsland region of the Australian state of Victoria.

== Course and features ==
Ada River rises below Marney Hill, northeast of Powelltown, in a state forestry area, and flows generally northeast, then south by east, before reaching its confluence with the Latrobe River, north of the Yarra Junction-Noojee Road, west of the locality of Noojee in the Shire of Baw Baw. The river descends 546 metres (1,791 ft) over its 14-kilometre (8.7 mi) course.

The Ada River sub-catchment area is managed by the West Gippsland Catchment Management Authority.

== See also ==
- List of rivers of Australia
