= Loch River =

River in Victoria, Australia

Loch Lock
- Mouth of the Loch River in Victoria

Location
- Country: Australia
- State: Victoria
- Region: South East Coastal Plain (IBRA), West Gippsland
- LGA: Shire of Baw Baw
- Town: Noojee

Physical characteristics
- Source: Roy Hill, Great Dividing Range
  - location: State forestry area east northeast of Powelltown and southeast of Warburton East
  - coordinates: 37°49′01″S 145°55′51″E
  - elevation: 896 m (2,940 ft)
- Mouth: confluence with the Latrobe River
  - location: Noojee
  - coordinates: 37°53′30″S 145°59′51″E
  - elevation: 228 m (748 ft)
- Length: 19 km (12 mi)

Basin features
- River system: West Gippsland catchment

The Loch River is a perennial river of the West Gippsland catchment, in the West Gippsland region of the Australian state of Victoria.

== Course and features ==
Loch River rises below Roy Hill within the Great Dividing Range, in a remote state forestry area east northeast of Powelltown and southeast of Warburton East. The river flows generally north, then east, then south by east through the Loch Valley, before reaching its confluence with the Latrobe River at the locality of Noojee in the Shire of Baw Baw. The river descends 668 metres (2,192 ft) over its 19-kilometre (12 mi) course.

The Loch River sub-catchment area is managed by the West Gippsland Catchment Management Authority.

== See also ==
- List of rivers of Australia
