= Blue Rock Dam =

Dam in Victoria, Australia

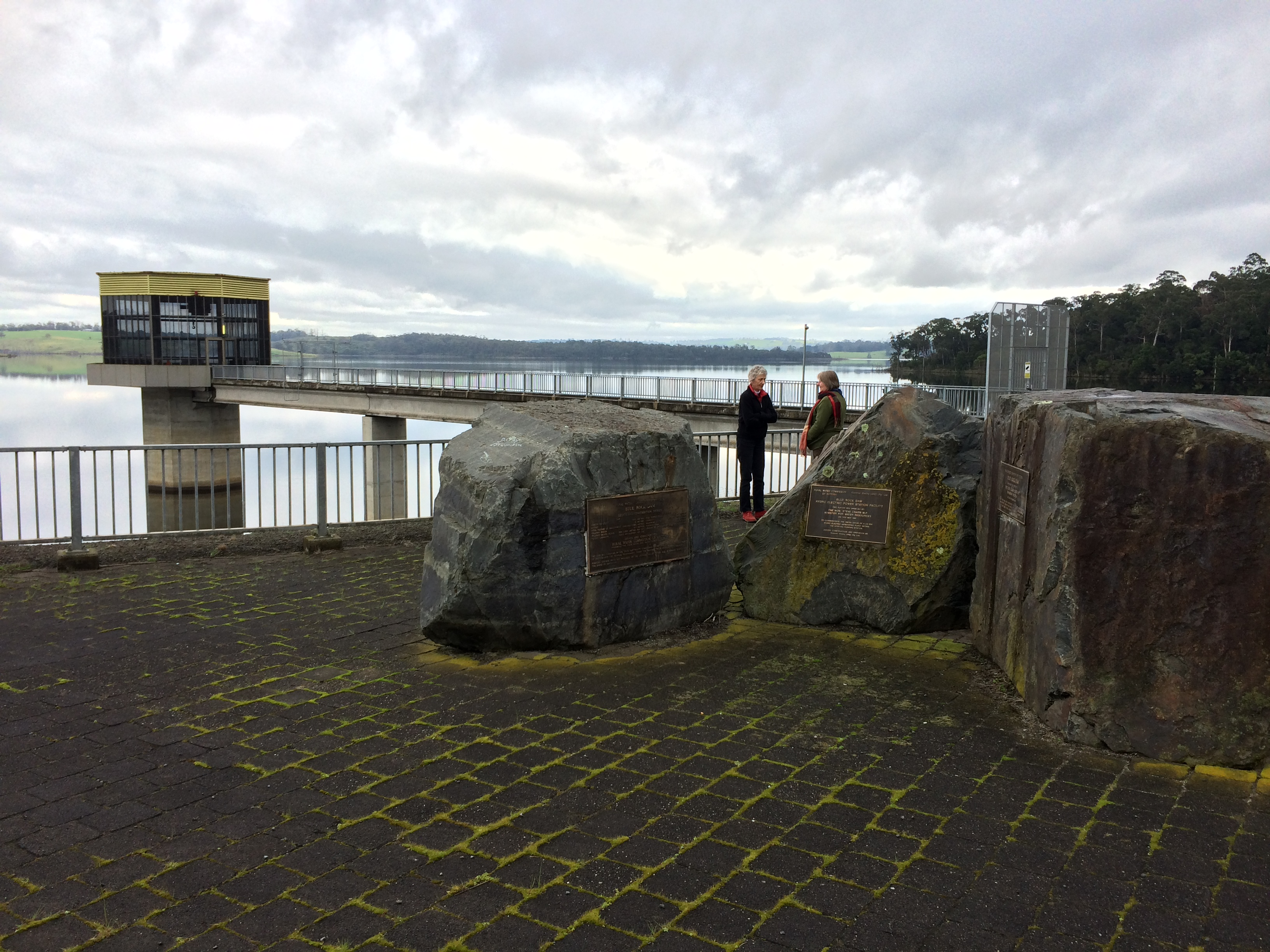
- Surrounds of plaques with intake tower at rear

- Location of the dam in Victoria
- Interactive map of Blue Rock Dam
- Country: Australia
- Location: Central Gippsland, Victoria
- Coordinates: 38°4′46.75″S 146°13′39.11″E
- Purpose: Power; Potable water supply
- Status: Operational
- Construction began: 1979
- Opening date: 1984
- Operator: Southern Rural Water

Dam and spillways
- Type of dam: Rock-fill dam
- Impounds: Tanjil River
- Height: 72 m (236 ft)
- Length: 600 m (2,000 ft)
- Dam volume: 1.514×10^{6} m^{3} (53.5×10^{6} ft^{3})
- Spillways: 1
- Spillway type: Controlled chute
- Spillway capacity: 1,200 m^{3}/s (42,000 cu ft/s)

Reservoir
- Creates: Blue Rock Lake
- Total capacity: 208 GL (169,000 acre⋅ft)
- Catchment area: 360 km^{2} (140 sq mi)
- Surface area: 873 ha (2,160 acres)

Blue Rock Dam Power Station
- Operator: Pacific Energy
- Commission date: 1992
- Type: Conventional
- Installed capacity: 2.6 MW (3,500 hp)
- Annual generation: 9 GWh (32 TJ)
- Website srw.com.au

The Blue Rock Dam is an embankment dam across the Tanjil River, located approximately 30 kilometres (19 mi) north of Moe, in the Central Gippsland region of Victoria, Australia. Completed in 1984, the dam created the Blue Rock Lake, to provide cooling water for the thermal power stations in the Latrobe Valley, and to augment domestic water supplies. The dam is operated by Southern Rural Water.

== Dam and reservoir overview ==
The rock-filled dam wall is 72 metres (236 ft) high and 600 metres (2,000 ft) long. When full, the resultant reservoir has a storage capacity of 208 gigalitres (169,000 acre⋅ft) and covers 873 hectares (2,160 acres), drawn from a catchment area of 360 square kilometres (140 sq mi). The controlled chute spillway has a discharge capacity of 1,200 cubic metres per second (42,000 cu ft/s).

The Blue Rock Lake has two recreation areas on its shore and small power boats are allowed to be used.

In 1992, Pacific Energy installed a small 2.4-megawatt (3,200 hp) conventional hydroelectric generator that is linked to the national grid.

== Body found ==
Jaidyn Leskie was a one-year-old child who disappeared from his babysitter's house in Moe on 15 June 1997. A large scale search was initiated in the hope of finding him alive; however, it was unsuccessful. Found deceased on 1 January 1998 at the Blue Rock Dam, his body was preserved by the cold waters of the lake through winter. His clothing was DNA tested in an effort to solve the crime. A subsequent trial for his murder was proven not guilty, and a 2006 inquest was inconclusive as to the perpetrator of the murder.

== Gallery ==
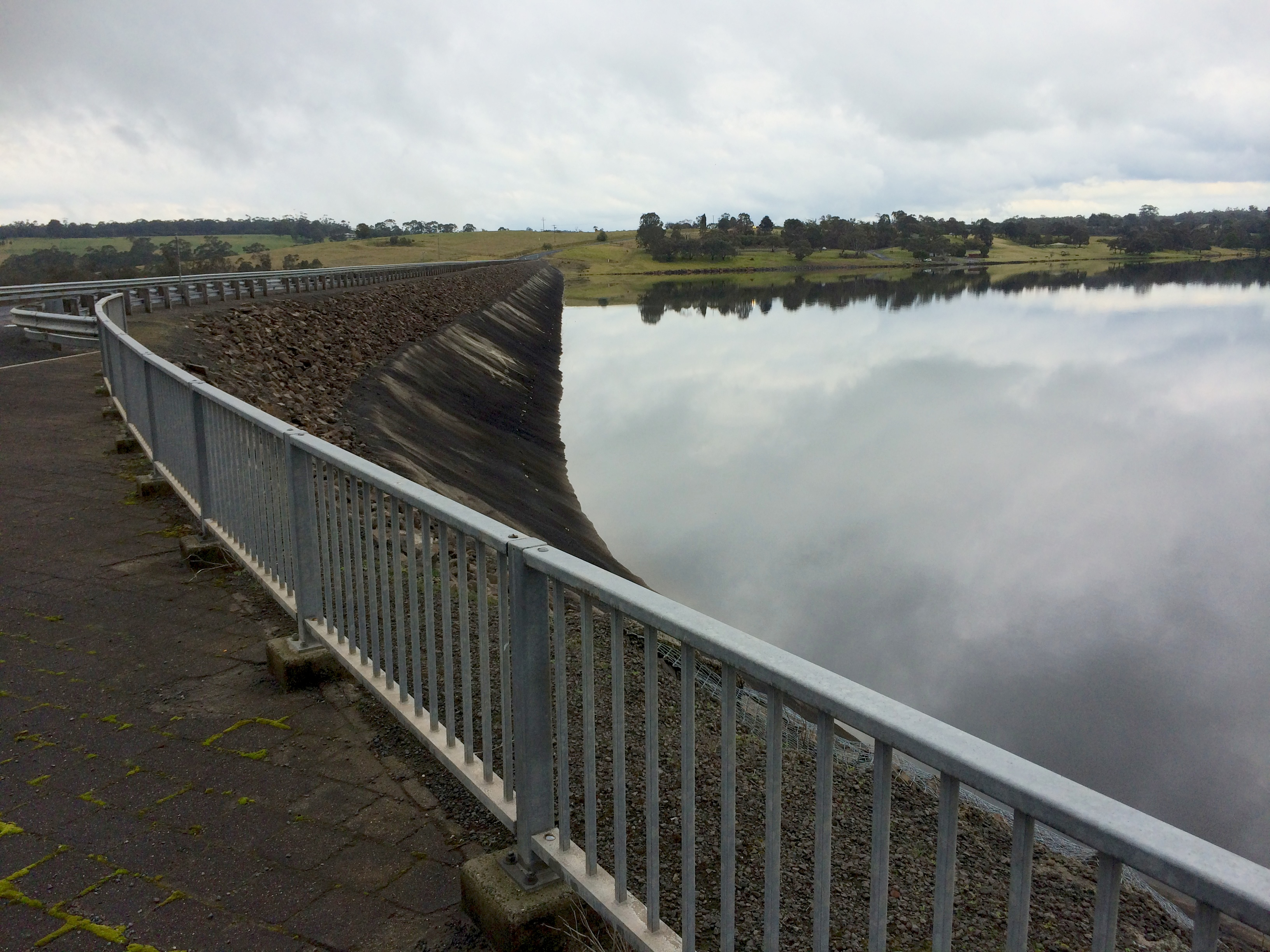
Road goes over wall

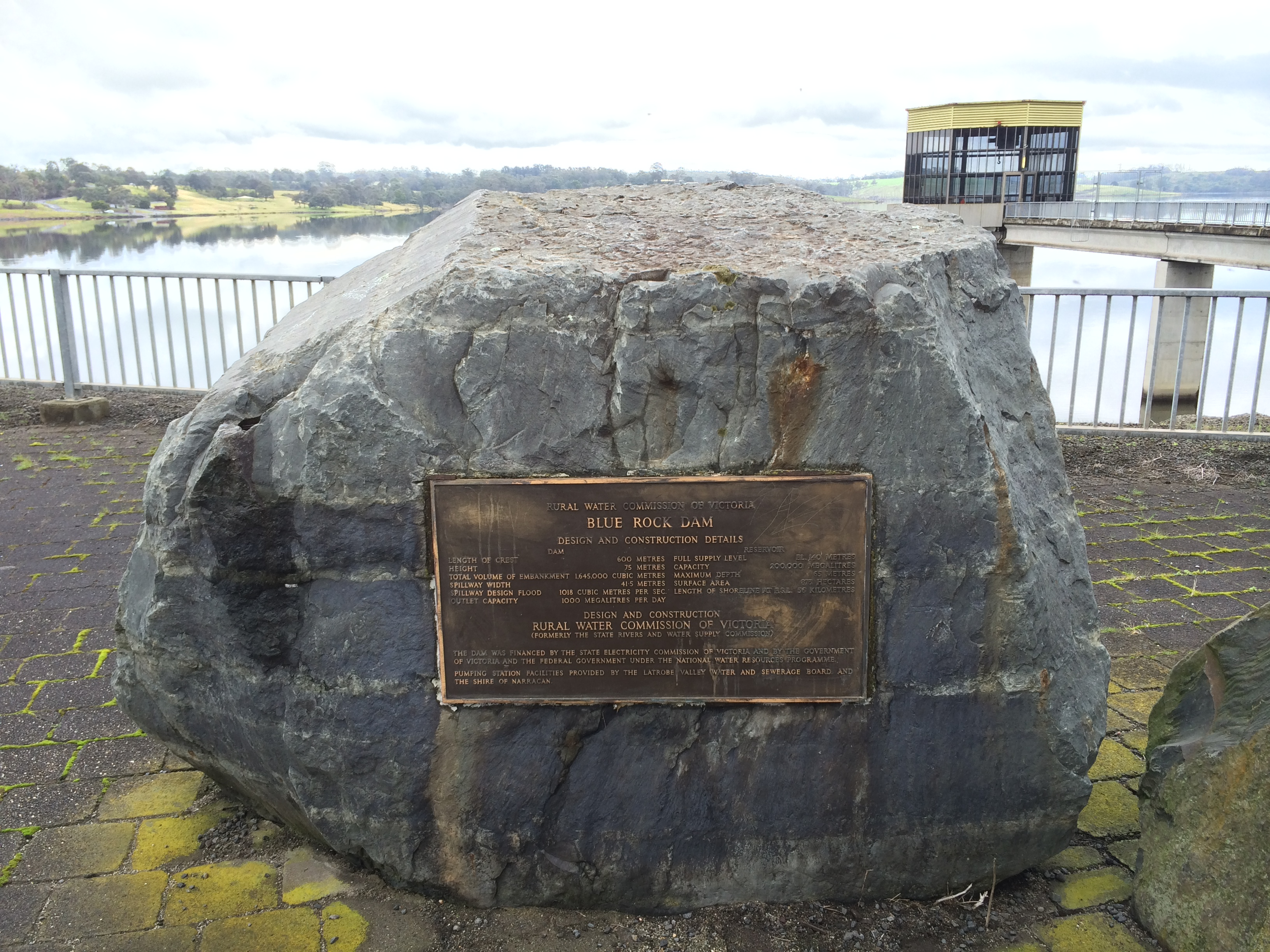
Plaque records design and construction details

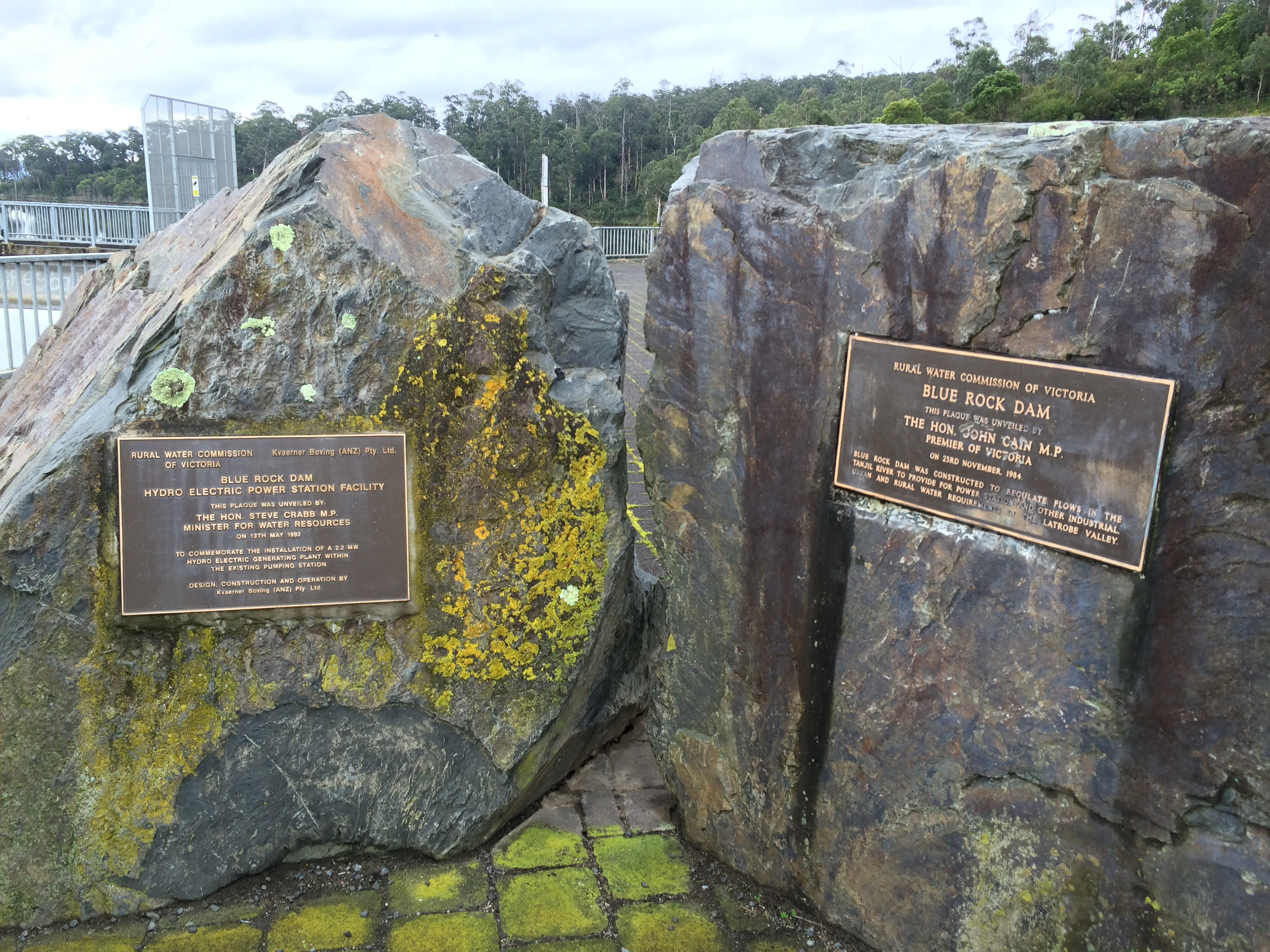
Plaques detail unveiling ceremonies

== See also ==
- List of power stations in Victoria
- List of reservoirs and dams in Victoria
