= Tanjil River =

River in Victoria, Australia

Tanjil
- Location of the Tanjil River mouth in Victoria

Location
- Country: Australia
- State: Victoria
- Region: South East Coastal Plain (IBRA), West Gippsland
- Local government areas: Shire of Baw Baw, Latrobe City

Physical characteristics
- Source: Tanjil River East Branch
  - location: below Mount Baw Baw
  - elevation: 1,250 m (4,100 ft)
- 2nd source: Tanjil River West Branch
  - location: below Mount Tooronga, Tanjil Bren
  - elevation: 677 m (2,221 ft)
- Source confluence: East and West branches of the Tanjil River
  - location: Mount Tanjil Nature Reserve, between Neerim South and Rawson
  - coordinates: 37°58′46″S 146°11′36″E
  - elevation: 202 m (663 ft)
- Mouth: confluence with the Latrobe River
  - location: west of Lake Narracan
  - coordinates: 38°9′1″S 146°16′46″E
  - elevation: 53 m (174 ft)
- Length: 34 km (21 mi)

Basin features
- River system: West Gippsland catchment
- Tributaries
  - left: Boggy Creek
  - right: Russell Creek (Victoria)

The Tanjil River is a perennial river of the West Gippsland catchment, in the West Gippsland region of the Australian state of Victoria.

== Course and features ==
Formed by the confluence of the Tanjil River West Branch that drains the eastern slopes of Mount Toorongo from an elevation of 677 metres (2,221 ft) and the northwestern slopes of the Mount Baw Baw from an elevation of 1,485 metres (4,872 ft) and the Tanjil River East Branch that drains the western slopes of Mount Baw Baw from an elevation of 1,520 metres (4,990 ft), the Tanjil River rises below Hill End within the Great Dividing Range, in the Mount Tanjil Nature Reserve east of Neerim South and southwest of Rawson. The river flows in a highly meandering course generally south, then south by east, joined by two minor tributaries, before reaching its confluence with the Latrobe River west of both Lake Narracan and Yallourn North in the Latrobe City local government area. The river descends 149 metres (489 ft) over its 34-kilometre (21 mi) course.

The Tanjil River is impounded by the Blue Rock Dam, that provides cooling water for thermal power stations sited in the Latrobe Valley, and to augment domestic water supplies. A small 2.4-megawatt (3,200 hp) hydroelectric power station is located on the river below the dam wall.

The Tanjil River sub-catchment area is managed by the West Gippsland Catchment Management Authority.

== See also ==
- List of rivers of Australia
