= Shire of Alberton =

Former local government area in Victoria, Australia

Coordinates: 38°33′S 146°40′E

Shire of Alberton Victoria
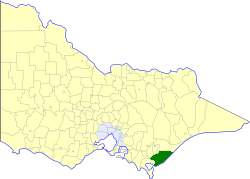
- Location in Victoria
- The Shire of Alberton as of its dissolution in 1994
- Population: 6,430 (1992)
  - Density: 3.4407/km^{2} (8.911/sq mi)
- Established: 1855
- Area: 1,868.83 km^{2} (721.6 sq mi)
- Council seat: Yarram
- Region: South Gippsland
- County: Buln Buln
LGAs around Shire of Alberton:
Morwell; Traralgon	Rosedale	Rosedale
South Gippsland	Shire of Alberton	Bass Strait
South Gippsland	Bass Strait	Bass Strait

The Shire of Alberton was a local government area about 220 kilometres (137 mi) southeast of Melbourne, the state capital of Victoria, Australia. The shire covered an area of 1,868.83 square kilometres (721.6 sq mi), and existed from 1855 until 1994.

== History ==
Alberton was first incorporated as a road district on 6 November 1855, one of the first ten in the colony, and became a shire on 2 February 1864. On 16 February 1894, part of the shire was excised, to become the Shire of South Gippsland. On 20 May 1914, it lost part of its North Riding to the Shire of Rosedale.

On 2 December 1994, the Shire of Alberton was abolished, and along with the City of Sale, the Shires of Avon and Maffra and parts of the Shire of Rosedale, was merged into the newly created Shire of Wellington.

== Wards ==
The Shire of Alberton was divided into three ridings, each of which elected three councillors:

- South Riding
- Central Riding
- North Riding

== Towns and localities ==
- Alberton
- Alberton West
- Balook
- Binginwarri
- Blackwarry
- Calrossie
- Carrajung
- Carrajung South
- Darriman
- Devon North
- Gelliondale
- Giffard
- Gormandale
- Hiawatha
- Jack River
- Landsborough
- Macks Creek
- Madalya
- Manns Beach
- McLoughlins Beach
- Port Albert
- Robertsons Beach
- Staceys Bridge
- Tarra Valley
- Tarraville
- Womerah
- Won Wron
- Woodside
- Woodside Beach
- Woodside North
- Woranga
- Yarram*

* Council seat.

== Population ==
Year	Population
1954	5,602
1958	5,820*
1961	5,926
1966	5,846
1971	5,803
1976	5,673
1981	5,922
1986	5,972
1991	5,972

* Estimate in the 1958 Victorian Year Book.
