= City of Morwell =

- Local government area
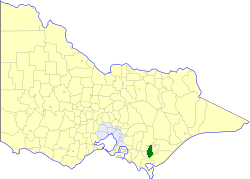
- Location in Victoria

- The City of Morwell as at its dissolution in 1994
- Country: Australia
- State: Victoria
- Region: Latrobe Valley
- Established: 1892
- Council seat: Morwell

Area
  - Total: 670.81 km^{2} (259.00 sq mi)

Population
  - Total: 27,320 (1992)
  - Density: 40.727/km^{2} (105.482/sq mi)
- County: Buln Buln, Tanjil
LGAs around City of Morwell
Narracan	Narracan	Traralgon
Mirboo	City of Morwell	Traralgon
Woorayl	South Gippsland	Alberton

The City of Morwell was a local government area about 150 kilometres (93 mi) east-southeast of Melbourne, the state capital of Victoria, Australia. The city covered an area of 670.81 square kilometres (259.0 sq mi), and existed from 1892 until 1994.

== History ==
Originally split between the Shires of Traralgon and Narracan, Morwell was first incorporated as a shire on 22 May 1892. On 11 December 1916, parts of the Boolarra and Yinnar ridings were annexed to the Shire of Mirboo. On 24 September 1947, under the terms of the State Electricity Commission (Yallourn Area) Act 1947, a town was proclaimed on 3.05 square kilometres (754 acres) at the Narracan-Morwell border; this self-governing area, under the auspices of the State Electricity Commission of Victoria, came to be known as the Yallourn Works Area, and at one point housed over 5,000 workers from the nearby coal mines. On 28 August 1955, the Borough of Moe was severed from Narracan and incorporated, and land from Morwell's western riding was annexed to it. On 23 September 1990, Morwell was proclaimed a city.

On 2 December 1994, the City of Morwell was abolished, and along with the Cities of Moe and Traralgon, the Shire of Traralgon, and parts of the Shires of Narracan and Rosedale, was merged into the newly created Shire of La Trobe.

== Wards ==
The City of Morwell was divided into six wards on 3 August 1991, each of which elected two councillors:

- Churchill Ward
- Rural Ward
- West Ward
- North Ward
- East Ward
- South Ward

== Towns and localities ==
- Boolarra
- Budgeree
- Churchill
- Darlimurla
- Driffield
- Gunyah
- Hazelwood
- Hazelwood North
- Jeeralang
- Jumbuk
- Livingston
- Morwell*
- Yallourn North
- Yinnar
- Yinnar South

* Council seat.

== Population ==
Year	Population
1954	13,033
1958	15,460*
1961	18,359
1966	20,773
1971	22,453
1976	22,654
1981	25,361
1986	26,743
1991	26,461

* Estimate in the 1958 Victorian Year Book.
