= Bena, Victoria =

Bena
- Town
- Coordinates: 38°24′40″S 145°45′41″E
- Country: Australia
- State: Victoria
- LGA: South Gippsland Shire

Government
  - State electorate: Gippsland South
  - Federal division: Monash

Population
  - Total: 303 (2021 census)
- Postcode: 3946

Bena is a town in the South Gippsland region of Victoria, Australia. It is located 100 km south-east of Melbourne and 8 km from Korumburra.

== History ==
The area was heavily timbered temperate rainforest when settlers began to arrive to take up land after a new settler-friendly Land Act was introduced by the Victorian government in 1878. The only access to the region was via McDonald's Track, a narrow path cut through the forest in 1862 by a team led by surveyor G. T. McDonald.

It took years for the first selectors to clear enough land on their blocks to earn a living from their properties. The lack of roads, and no rail access, was a major problem for the first arrivals. It initially restricted settlers to producing what they could walk out along the pack-tracks that connected the clearings of individual settlers with McDonald's Track.

A route was surveyed for the Great Southern Railway in the 1880s. One of the planned railway stations was to be on land owned by Robert Fuller (1819–1899), a master mariner. He and his son, also named Robert, had the land on either side of the railway station site privately surveyed in 1887. It was then subdivided into plots for a township they called Cromwell. Advertisements appeared for the sale of 50 residential and business allotments opposite the railway station in the Gippsland Independent newspaper in Drouin in February 1888.

A post office was established in 1890. By that time the settlement was known as Bena, an Aboriginal name for the lyrebird. Robert Fuller and his son built a 40-room hotel that was open for business by 1889. They also constructed a bakery and a coffee palace, which were then leased. The first store in the community was built by a Mr. Whittet in 1887. A butcher's shop was also built in 1887, and saleyards in 1889. Churches and a school (State School No. 3062) soon followed.

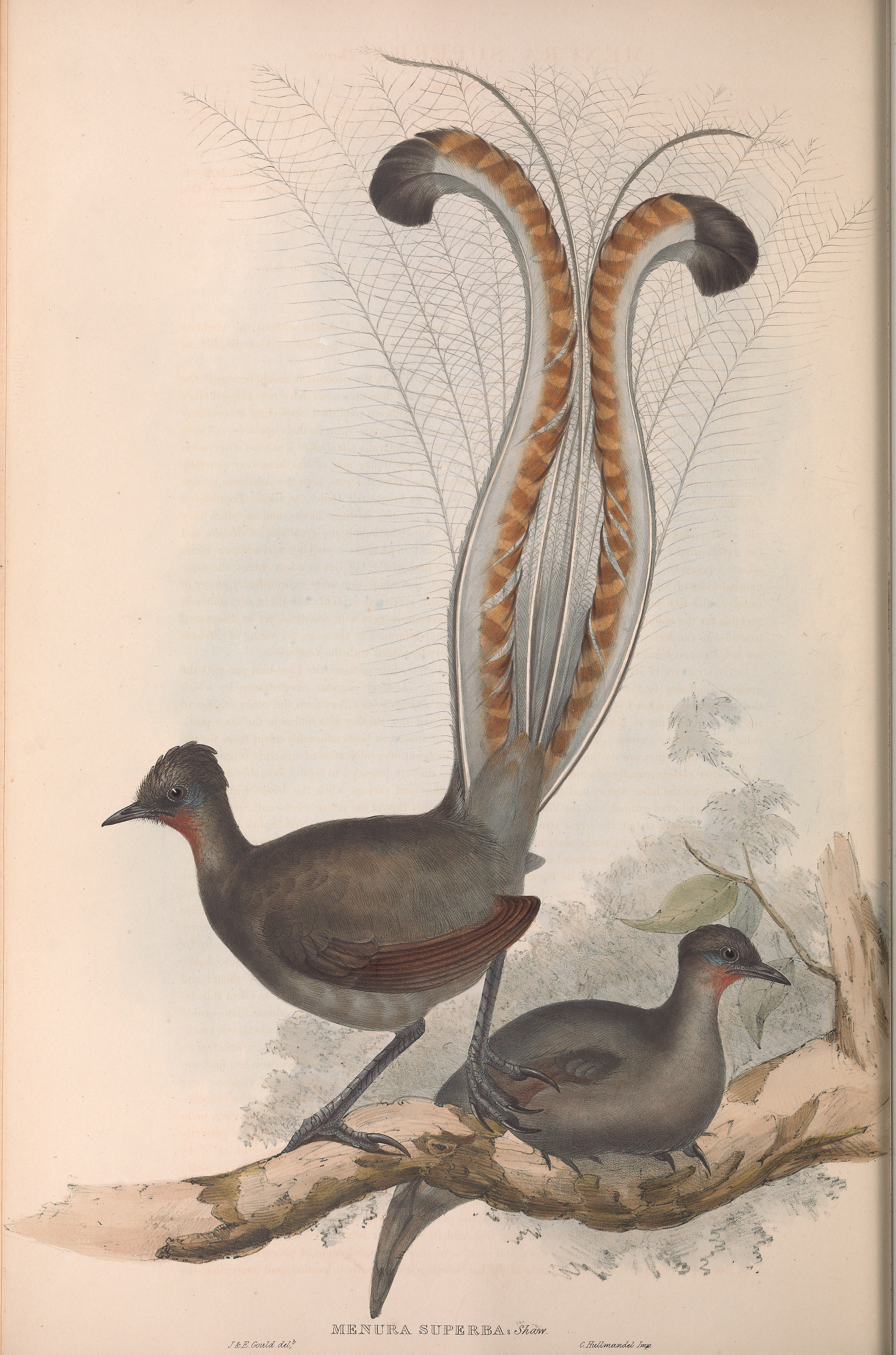
The lyrebird was once common in the area. This was reflected in the title of the first published history of the region, The Land of the Lyre Bird (1920).

Agricultural pursuits became important around Bena, particularly dairying. A butter factory was proposed by R. J. Fuller in 1892, and it opened for business the following year.

Local government in the area began with the creation of the Shire of Buln Buln in 1878. The southern part of the shire, including Bena, broke away and formed the Shire of Poowong and Jeetho in 1891. It was renamed the Shire of Korumburra in 1922. This in turn was absorbed into the Shire of South Gippsland in 1994.

== Sources ==
- Rees, Margaret N.G., Stories of Bena; The people and the country, Bena Community Group, 2013.
- The Land of the Lyre Bird; a story of early settlement in the Great Forest of South Gippsland, South Gippsland Development League, 1966.
- White, Joseph, The history of the shire of Korumburra, Shire of Korumburra, 1987.
