= Shire of Avon =

Coordinates: 37°58′S 147°05′E

Shire of Avon Victoria
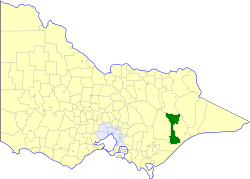
- Location in Victoria
- The Shire of Avon as at its dissolution in 1994
- Population: 4,360 (1992)
  - Density: 1.7213/km^{2} (4.458/sq mi)
- Established: 1864
- Area: 2,533 km^{2} (978.0 sq mi)
- Council seat: Stratford
- Region: Central Gippsland
- County: Tanjil, Dargo, Wonnangatta
LGAs around Shire of Avon:
Maffra	Bright	Omeo
Maffra	Shire of Avon	Bairnsdale
Sale (C)	Rosedale	Rosedale

The Shire of Avon was a local government area about 20 kilometres (12 mi) north of Sale, the major regional centre in central Gippsland, Victoria, Australia. The shire covered an area of 2,533 square kilometres (978.0 sq mi), and existed from 1864 until 1994.

== History ==
Avon was first incorporated as a road district on 13 September 1864, and became a shire on 10 October 1865. On 27 May 1914 and 1 October 1964, it annexed parts of the Shire of Bairnsdale, and on 2 May 1917, it annexed part of the eastern riding of the Shire of Maffra. During 1966 and 1967, parts of its area were annexed to the City of Sale.

On 2 December 1994, the Shire of Avon was abolished, and along with the City of Sale, the Shires of Alberton and Maffra and parts of the Shire of Rosedale, was merged into the newly created Shire of Wellington.

== Wards ==
The Shire of Avon was divided into three ridings, each of which elected three councillors:

- South Riding
- Central Riding
- North Riding

== Towns and localities ==
- Airly
- Cobains
- Clydebank
- Crooked River
- Dargo
- Hollands Landing
- Llowalong
- Meerlieu
- Montgomery
- Munro
- Perry Bridge
- RAAF Base East Sale
- Stockdale
- Stratford*
- The Heart
- Waterford

* Council seat.

== Population ==
Year	Population
1954	3,215
1958	3,400*
1961	3,295
1966	3,237
1971	3,090
1976	3,000
1981	3,520
1986	3,859
1991	4,025

* Estimate in the 1958 Victorian Year Book.
