= Jack River =

Jack River may refer to:

- Jack River (Queensland), a tributary of the Normanby River in Queensland, Australia
- Jack River (East Gippsland, Victoria), a river in the Shire of East Gippsland, Victoria, Australia
- Jack River, Victoria, a settlement in the Shire of Wellington, Victoria, Australia
- Jack River (Wellington, Victoria), a river in the Shire of Wellington (after which the settlement is named)
- Jack River (musician), stage name of Australian musician Holly Rankin

== See also ==
- Jacks River
- Jock River
