= City of Traralgon =

Coordinates: 38°11′S 146°32′E

City of Traralgon Victoria
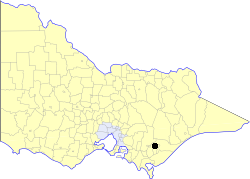
- Location in Victoria
- The City of Traralgon as at its dissolution in 1994
- Population: 20,520 (1992)
  - Density: 917.3/km^{2} (2,375.8/sq mi)
- Established: 1961
- Area: 22.37 km^{2} (8.6 sq mi)
- Council seat: Traralgon
- Region: Latrobe Valley
- County: Buln Buln

The City of Traralgon was a local government area about 160 kilometres (99 mi) east-southeast of Melbourne, the state capital of Victoria, Australia, in the Latrobe Valley region. The city covered an area of 22.37 square kilometres (8.64 sq mi), and existed from the time of its severance from the Shire of Traralgon in 1961 until 1994.

== History ==
From 1879 until 1961, Traralgon was part of the shire which surrounded it. On 31 May 1961, it was incorporated as a borough, and on 2 April 1964, it was proclaimed a city.

On 2 December 1994, the City of Traralgon was abolished, and along with the Cities of Moe and Morwell, the Shire of Traralgon, and parts of the Shires of Narracan and Rosedale, was merged into the newly created Shire of La Trobe.

=== Wards ===
The City of Traralgon was unsubdivided, and its twelve councillors represented the entire city.

== Population ==
Year	Population
1958	9,950*
1961	12,300
1966	14,080
1971	14,666
1976	15,089
1981	18,057
1986	19,233
1991	19,699

* Estimate in the 1958 Victorian Year Book.
