= Buln Buln =

Buln Buln may refer to several places in Victoria, Australia:

- Buln Buln, Victoria, a town in West Gippsland
- Shire of Buln Buln, an administrative area in South Gippsland
- County of Buln Buln, a cadastral division of South Gippsland
