= Buln Buln railway station =

Former railway station in Victoria, Australia

Buln Buln

General information
- Location: Australia
- Owner: VicTrack
- Line: Noojee

Other information
- Status: Demolished

History
- Opened: 1890
- Closed: 1958

Services
Preceding station	Disused railways	Following station
Lillico	Noojee line	Bravington
	List of closed railway stations in Victoria	

Buln Buln railway station was a railway station on the Noojee railway line. It was located in the town of Buln Buln. It was opened in 1890 and closed in 1958. In 1977 the station was acquired and turned into a recreational reserve.
