= Rural City of Warragul =

Rural City of Warragul Victoria
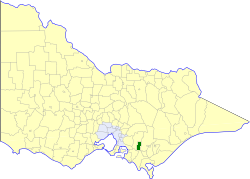
- Location in Victoria
- The Rural City of Warragul as at its dissolution in 1994
- Population: 13,540 (1992)
  - Density: 38.444/km^{2} (99.57/sq mi)
- Established: 1881
- Area: 352.2 km^{2} (136.0 sq mi)
- Council seat: Warragul
- Region: West Gippsland
- County: Buln Buln
LGAs around Rural City of Warragul:
Buln Buln	Buln Buln	Narracan
Buln Buln	Rural City of Warragul	Narracan
Korumburra	Woorayl	Mirboo

The Rural City of Warragul was a local government area about 100 kilometres (62 mi) east-southeast of Melbourne, the state capital of Victoria, Australia. The rural city covered an area of 352.2 square kilometres (136.0 sq mi), and existed from 1881 until 1994.

== History ==
Originally part of the Shire of Buln Buln, Warragul was first incorporated as a shire on 9 December 1881. It annexed part of the Western Riding of the Shire of Narracan on 30 May 1906. On 17 August 1990, Warragul was proclaimed a rural city, one of the first in Victoria under the provisions of the Local Government Act 1989.

On 2 December 1994, the Rural City of Warragul was abolished, and along with the Shires of Buln Buln and Narracan, and parts of the Shire of Upper Yarra, was merged into the newly created Shire of Baw Baw.

== Wards ==
The Rural City of Warragul was divided into four wards, each of which elected three councillors:

- North Ward
- South Ward
- Central East Ward
- Central West Ward

== Towns and localities ==
- Bona Vista
- Brandy Creek
- Bull Swamp
- Buln Buln
- Cloverlea
- Darnum
- Ellinbank
- Ferndale
- Gainsborough
- Lillico
- Nilma
- Rokeby
- Seaview
- Tetoora Road
- Warragul*
- Warragul South

* Council seat.

== Population ==
Year	Population
1954	8,605
1958	9,450*
1961	9,925
1966	9,925
1971	10,010
1976	10,377
1981	10,892
1986	11,748
1991	12,924

* Estimate in the 1958 Victorian Year Book.
