= Shire of Korumburra =

Coordinates: 38°26′S 145°49′E

Shire of Korumburra Victoria
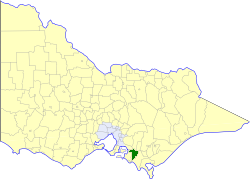
- Location in Victoria
- The Shire of Korumburra as at its dissolution in 1994
- Population: 8,030 (1992)
  - Density: 13.082/km^{2} (33.883/sq mi)
- Established: 1891
- Area: 613.8 km^{2} (237.0 sq mi)
- Council seat: Korumburra
- Region: West Gippsland
- County: Buln Buln, Mornington
LGAs around Shire of Korumburra:
| Pakenham | Buln Buln | Warragul |
| Bass | Shire of Korumburra | Woorayl |
| Bass | Woorayl | Woorayl |

The Shire of Korumburra was a local government area located about 115 kilometres (71 mi) southeast of Melbourne, the state capital of Victoria, Australia. The shire covered an area of 613.8 square kilometres (237.0 sq mi), and existed from 1891 until 1994.

== History ==
Originally part of the Shire of Buln Buln, Korumburra was first incorporated as the Shire of Poowong and Jeetho on 29 May 1891. Its boundaries were initially fairly flexible, as it annexed parts of the Warragul and Woorayl Shires, settling on its final boundaries by 1912. It was renamed Korumburra on 25 October 1922.

On 2 December 1994, the Shire of Korumburra was abolished, and along with the Shires of Mirboo and South Gippsland, and parts of the Shire of Woorayl, was merged into the new South Gippsland Shire. The Wattle Bank, Lance Creek and Lang Lang South districts in the west were transferred into the newly created Bass Coast Shire.

== Wards ==
The Shire of Korumburra was divided into three ridings, each of which elected three councillors:

- North Riding
- Central Riding
- South Riding

== Towns and localities ==
- Arawata
- Bena
- Ellerside
- Jeetho
- Jumbunna
- Kardella
- Kongwak
- Korumburra*
- Loch
- Nyora
- Outtrim
- Poowong
- Ranceby
- Strzelecki
- Whitelaw

* Council seat.

== Population ==
| Year | Population |
|---|---|
| 1954 | 7,386 |
| 1958 | 7,910* |
| 1961 | 7,813 |
| 1966 | 7,349 |
| 1971 | 6,938 |
| 1976 | 6,542 |
| 1981 | 6,571 |
| 1986 | 6,894 |
| 1991 | 7,573 |

* Estimate in the 1958 Victorian Year Book.
