= City of Sale =

Coordinates: 38°06′S 147°04′E

City of Sale Victoria
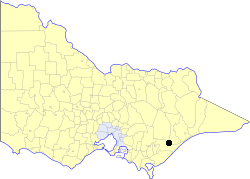
- Location in Victoria
- The City of Sale as at its dissolution in 1994
- Population: 14,180 (1992)
  - Density: 476.16/km^{2} (1,233.2/sq mi)
- Established: 1863
- Area: 29.78 km^{2} (11.5 sq mi)
- Council seat: Sale
- Region: Central Gippsland
- County: Tanjil
LGAs around City of Sale:
Maffra	Avon	Avon
Rosedale	City of Sale	Avon
Rosedale	Rosedale	Rosedale

The City of Sale was a local government area located about 210 kilometres (130 mi) east of Melbourne, the state capital of Victoria, Australia. The city covered an area of 29.78 square kilometres (11.5 sq mi), and existed from 1863 until 1994.

== History ==
Sale was first incorporated as a borough on 10 August 1863, and was extended on 24 December 1873. It became a town on 17 September 1924, and was proclaimed a city on 31 May 1950. In 1966-1967, it annexed a small area to its east and north-east from the Shire of Avon.

On 2 December 1994, the City of Sale was abolished, and along with the Shires of Alberton, Avon and Maffra, and parts of the Shire of Rosedale, was merged into the newly created Shire of Wellington.

== Wards ==
The City of Sale was divided into three wards, each of which elected three councillors:

- South Ward
- North Ward
- East Ward

== Towns and localities ==
- Pearsondale
- Sale*
- Wurruk

* Council seat.

== Population ==
Year	Population
1954	6,537
1958	7,330*
1961	7,899
1966	8,648
1971	10,478
1976	12,111
1981	12,968
1986	13,559
1991	13,858

* Estimate in the 1958 Victorian Year Book.
