= Licola North =

Licola North Victoria
- Coordinates: 37°31′01″S 146°32′00″E
- Population: 0 (2021 census)
- Postcode(s): 3858
- Time zone: AEST (UTC+10)
  - Summer (DST): AEST (UTC+11)
- LGA(s): Shire of Wellington
- State electorate(s): Gippsland East
- Federal division(s): Gippsland

Licola North is a locality in the Shire of Wellington, Victoria, Australia. At the 2021 census, Licola North had a population that was too low to be reported in the 2021 census.
