= List of places on the Victorian Heritage Register in the Shire of Baw Baw =

This is a list of places on the Victorian Heritage Register in the Shire of Baw Baw in Victoria, Australia. The Victorian Heritage Register is maintained by the Heritage Council of Victoria.

The Victorian Heritage Register, as of 2021, lists the following sixteen state-registered places within the Shire of Baw Baw:

Place name	Place #	Location	Suburb or Town	Co-ordinates	Built	State registered	Photo
Brunton's Bridge	H1450	Bruntons Bridge Road	Walhalla	37.998778°S 146.472694°E	1887	20 August 1982	
Former Walhalla Post Office and Residence	H0583	Main Road	Walhalla	37.943222°S 146.450694°E	1885	29 August 1984	
Lower Goodwood Kilns	H1819	Goodwood Mill Track	Gentle Annie	37.889111°S 145.866278°E	1931	17 June 1999	
New Ada Mill	H1820	Walk Into History Track	Ada	37.818583°S 145.842361°E	1931	17 June 1999	
New Federal Mill	H1821	Upper Yarra Walking Track	Ada	37.820833°S 145.835583°E	1935	17 June 1999	
Primary School No. 1924	H1627	153-161 Princes Way	Drouin	38.132306°S 145.854694°E	1936	20 August 1982	
Rail Bridge	H1443	Thomson River	Walhalla	37.959333°S 146.420389°E	1910	20 August 1982	
Rail Bridge	H1435	Noojee Trestle Bridge Rail Trail	Noojee	37.899583°S 145.985778°E	1919	9 October 1974	
Thomson River Diversion Tunnel Site	H1990	Thomson River	Walhalla	37.972222°S 146.424472°E	1912	11 July 2002	
Timber Bridge	H1995	Bloomfield Rd	Crossover	38.053222°S 145.966000°E	1892	22 August 2002	
Tramway Bridge	H1444	Australian Alps Walking Track	Walhalla	37.931806°S 146.414806°E	1900	20 August 1982	
Walhalla Bandstand	H1315	Main Road	Walhalla	37.941472°S 146.451778°E	1896	8 May 1997	
Walhalla Cemetery	H1976	Main Road	Walhalla	37.948500°S 146.451417°E		14 February 2002	
Warragul Drill Hall	H0600	40 Alfred Street	Warragul	38.166500°S 145.934000°E	1912-1913	13 September 2007	
Warragul Railway Station	H1598	122 Queen Street	Warragul	38.165028°S 145.933083°E	1915	20 August 1982	
Windsor House	H0326	Right Hand Branch Road	Walhalla	37.941944°S 146.453111°E	1890	9 October 1974	
