= Shire of Woorayl =

Coordinates: 38°29′S 145°57′E

- Local government area
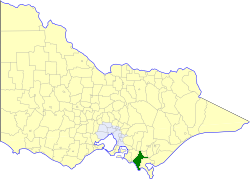
- Location in Victoria
- The Shire of Woorayl as at its dissolution in 1994
- Country: Australia
- State: Victoria
- Region: South Gippsland
- Established: 1888
- Council seat: Leongatha

Area
  - Total: 1,245.79 km^{2} (481.00 sq mi)

Population
  - Total: 12,030 (1992)
  - Density: 9.657/km^{2} (25.010/sq mi)
- County: Buln Buln
LGAs around Shire of Woorayl
| Korumburra | Warragul | Mirboo |
| Bass | Shire of Woorayl | South Gippsland |
| Bass Strait | Bass Strait | South Gippsland |

The Shire of Woorayl was a local government area in Australia. It was located about 130 kilometres (81 mi) southeast of Melbourne, the state capital of Victoria, Australia. The shire covered an area of 1,245.79 square kilometres (481.0 sq mi), and existed from 1888 until 1994.

== History ==
Initially part of the Shire of Narracan, Woorayl was first incorporated as a shire on 25 May 1888. It annexed the South Riding of the Shire of Alberton on 14 March 1890, and the Mirboo Riding of the Shire of Traralgon on 1 May 1891. Over the next 20 years, various boundary changes occurred between Woorayl, Korumburra, Narracan, and South Gippsland.

On 2 December 1994, the Shire of Woorayl was abolished, and along with the Shires of Mirboo, South Gippsland and parts of the Shire of Korumburra, was merged into the new Shire of South Gippsland. The area around Inverloch was transferred into the newly created Shire of Bass Coast.

== Wards ==
Woorayl was divided into four ridings in May 1975, each of which elected three councillors:

- North Riding
- Central Riding
- West Riding
- South Riding

== Towns and localities ==
- Dumbalk
- Hallston
- Inverloch
- Koonwarra
- Leongatha*
- Leongatha South
- Meeniyan
- Mount Eccles
- Nerrena
- Ruby
- Tarwin Lower
- Venus Bay

* Council seat.

== Population ==
| Year | Population |
|---|---|
| 1954 | 7,046 |
| 1958 | 7,820* |
| 1961 | 8,784 |
| 1966 | 8,922 |
| 1971 | 9,145 |
| 1976 | 9,525 |
| 1981 | 9,854 |
| 1986 | 10,644 |
| 1991 | 11,003 |

* Estimate in the 1958 Victorian Year Book.
