= Albert River =

Albert River may refer to:

- Albert River (Victoria), in Gippsland, southeastern Victoria, Australia
- Albert River (South East Queensland), in southeastern Queensland, Australia
- Albert River (Gulf Savannah), in northwestern Queensland, Australia
