= Bravington railway station =

Former railway station in Victoria, Australia

Bravington

General information
- Location: Australia
- Owner: VicTrack
- Line: Noojee

Other information
- Status: Demolished

History
- Opened: 1890
- Closed: 1958

Services
Preceding station	Disused railways	Following station
Buln Buln	Noojee line	Rokeby
	List of closed railway stations in Victoria	

Bravington railway station was a railway station on the Noojee railway line. It was located in the town of Bravington. It was opened on 12 May 1890 when the railway line was laid through the town and closed in 1958.
