= Tarwin =

Tarwin may refer to:

- Tarwin, Victoria
- Tarwin Lower, Victoria
- Tarwin River
