= Franklin River (disambiguation) =

Franklin River may refer to:

- Franklin River in Tasmania
- Franklin River (Vancouver Island)
- Franklin River (Victoria)
