= City of Moe =

Coordinates: 38°10′S 146°16′E

City of Moe Victoria
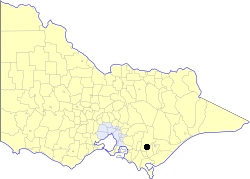
- Location in Victoria
- The City of Moe as at its dissolution in 1994
- Population: 17,570 (1992)
  - Density: 374/km^{2} (968/sq mi)
- Established: 1955
- Area: 47 km^{2} (18.1 sq mi)
- Council seat: Moe
- Region: Latrobe Valley
- County: Buln Buln
LGAs around City of Moe:
Shire of Narracan	Shire of Narracan	Shire of Narracan
Shire of Narracan	City of Moe	Yallourn Works Area
Shire of Narracan	Shire of Narracan	City of Morwell

The City of Moe was a local government area about 130 kilometres (81 mi) east-southeast of Melbourne, the state capital of Victoria, Australia. The city covered an area of 47 square kilometres (18.1 sq mi), and existed from 1955 until 1994.

== History ==
Moe was, for most of its history, part of the Shire of Narracan, which was first incorporated in 1878. Its growth as an industrial centre, due to nearby coal-mining in the Latrobe Valley, resulted in a boom in population, and ultimately in its severance and incorporation as the Borough of Moe on 28 August 1955. On 6 March 1963, it was proclaimed a city. On 1 October 1990, further land was annexed to the city from Narracan.

On 2 December 1994, the City of Moe was abolished, and along with the Cities of Morwell and Traralgon, the Shire of Traralgon, and parts of the Shires of Narracan and Rosedale, was merged into the newly created Shire of La Trobe.

== Wards ==
The City of Moe was divided into three wards, each of which elected three councillors:

- Centre Riding
- East Riding
- West Riding

== Towns and localities ==
Boundary for the City of Moe prior to its 1990 expansion
- Moe*
- Moe South
- Newborough

* Council seat.

== Population ==
Year	Population
1958	13,560*
1961	15,463
1966	16,544
1971	15,605
1976	15,345
1981	16,649
1986	16,999
1991	16,719

* Estimate in the 1958 Victorian Year Book.
