= Shire of Traralgon =

Coordinates: 38°11′S 146°32′E

- Local government area
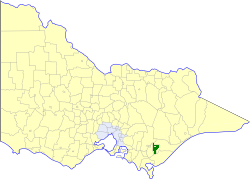
- Location in Victoria
- The Shire of Traralgon as at its dissolution in 1994
- Country: Australia
- State: Victoria
- Region: Latrobe Valley
- Established: 1879
- Council seat: Traralgon

Area
  - Total: 4,650 km^{2} (1,800 sq mi)

Population
  - Total: 4,810 (1992)
  - Density: 1.0344/km^{2} (2.679/sq mi)
- County: Buln Buln, Tanjil
LGAs around Shire of Traralgon
Narracan	Rosedale	Rosedale
Morwell	Shire of Traralgon	Rosedale
Morwell	Alberton	Alberton

The Shire of Traralgon was a local government area about 160 kilometres (99 mi) east-southeast of Melbourne, the state capital of Victoria, Australia. The shire covered an area of 4,650 square kilometres (1,795.4 sq mi), and existed from 1879 until 1994. From 1961 onwards, it did not actually administer the town of Traralgon, which was the responsibility of a separate authority.

== History ==
Traralgon was incorporated as a shire on 24 October 1879. On 27 May 1892, it lost its Western Riding, which formed the Shire of Morwell. The town of Traralgon was incorporated separately as a borough on 31 May 1961, becoming the City of Traralgon three years later.

On 2 December 1994, the Shire of Traralgon was abolished, and along with the Cities of Moe, Morwell and Traralgon, and parts of the Shires of Narracan and Rosedale, was merged into the newly created City of Latrobe.

== Ridings ==
The Shire of Traralgon was divided into two ridings, each of which elected three councillors:

- Central Riding
- East Riding

== Towns and localities ==
- Callignee
- Flynns Creek
- Koornalla
- Loy Yang
- Traralgon South
- Traralgon West
- Tyers

== Population ==
Year	Population
1954	10,036
1958	11,180*
1961	1,229
1966	1,265
1971	1,336
1976	1,775
1981	3,324
1986	4,228
1991	4,659

* Estimate in the 1958 Victorian Year Book.
