= Baromi =

- Town
- Coordinates: 38°24′5″S 146°10′37″E
- Country: Australia
- State: Victoria
- LGA: South Gippsland Shire
- Location: 156.4 km (97.2 mi) SE of Melbourne; 26.9 km (16.7 mi) NE of Leongatha

Government
  - State electorate: Gippsland South
  - Federal division: Monash

Population
  - Total: 149 (2021)
- Postcode: 3871

Baromi is a locality in Victoria, Australia. At the 2021 census, Baromi recorded a population of 149.

== Demographics ==
As of the 2021 Australian census, 149 people resided in Baromi, up from 127 in the 2016 census. The median age of persons in Baromi was 37 years. There were more males than females, with 52.3% of the population male and 47.7% female. The average household size was 2.5 people per household.
