= Shire of Mirboo =

Coordinates: 38°24′S 146°09′E

Shire of Mirboo Victoria
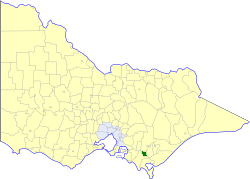
- Location in Victoria
- The Shire of Mirboo as at its dissolution in 1994
- Population: 2,710 (1992)
  - Density: 10.625/km^{2} (27.52/sq mi)
- Established: 1894
- Area: 255.07 km^{2} (98.5 sq mi)
- Council seat: Mirboo North
- Region: South Gippsland
- County: Buln Buln
LGAs around Shire of Mirboo:
Warragul	Narracan	Morwell
Woorayl	Shire of Mirboo	Morwell
Woorayl	Woorayl	Morwell

The Shire of Mirboo was a local government area about 160 kilometres (99 mi) southeast of Melbourne, the state capital of Victoria, Australia. The shire covered an area of 255.07 square kilometres (98.5 sq mi), and existed from 1894 until 1994.

== History ==
Mirboo was first incorporated as a shire out of parts of the East and West Ridings of the Shire of Narracan, and the East Riding of the Shire of Woorayl, on 13 April 1894. It annexed parts of the Boolarra and Yinnar Ridings of the Shire of Morwell on 11 December 1916. It annexed further parts of Woorayl on 31 May 1922, and Narracan on 21 March 1990.

On 2 December 1994, the Shire of Mirboo was abolished, and along with the Shire of South Gippsland and parts of the Shires of Korumburra and Woorayl, was merged into the new Shire of South Gippsland.

=== Ridings ===
Mirboo was unsubdivided, and its nine councillors represented the entire shire.

== Towns and localities ==
- Allambee East
- Allambee South
- Berrys Creek
- Darlmurla
- Delburn
- Limonite
- Mardan
- Mirboo North*

* Council seat.

== Population ==
Year	Population
1954	1,862
1958	1,970*
1961	2,052
1966	2,111
1971	1,964
1976	1,905
1981	2,080
1986	2,458
1991	2,542

* Estimate in the 1958 Victorian Year Book.
