= Bushy Park, Victoria =

Bushy Park Victoria
- Coordinates: 37°52′S 147°01′E
- Population: 50 (2016 census)
- Postcode(s): 3860
- LGA(s): Shire of Wellington
- State electorate(s): Gippsland East
- Federal division(s): Gippsland

Bushy Park is a locality in the Shire of Wellington, Victoria, Australia.

Bushy Park Post Office opened on 1 November 1889 and closed in 1938.

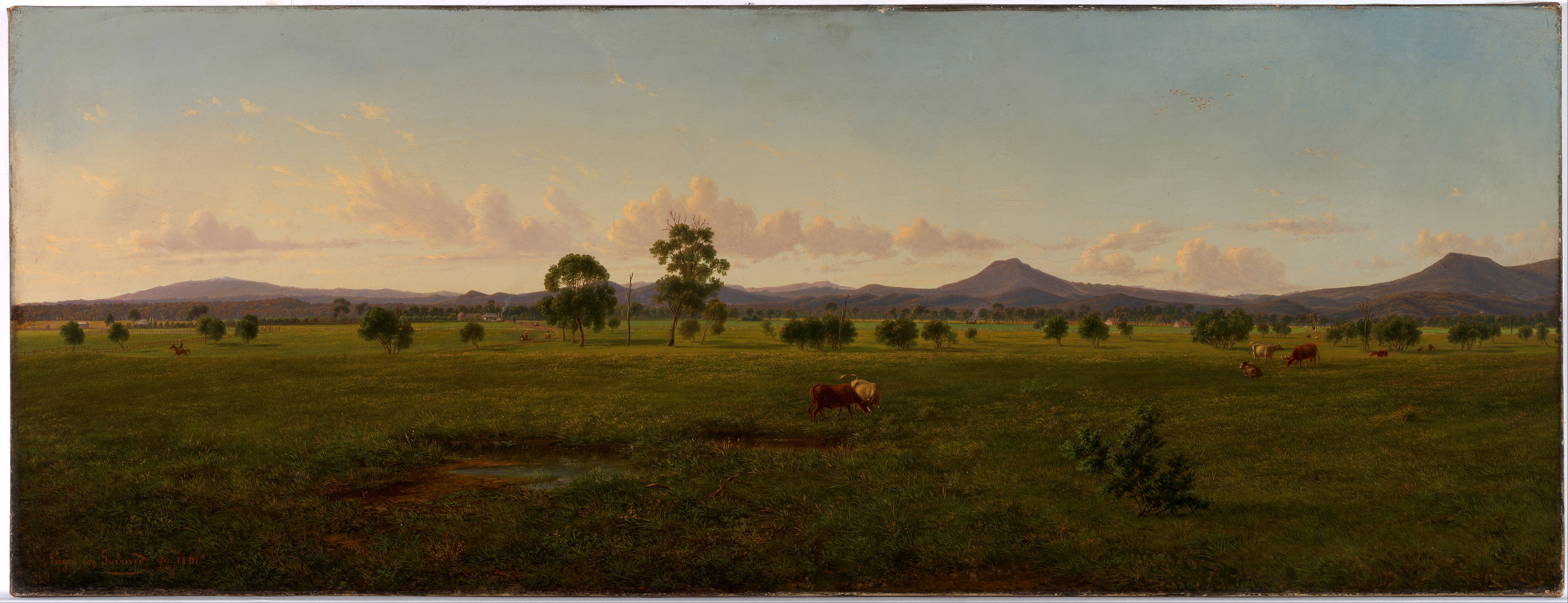
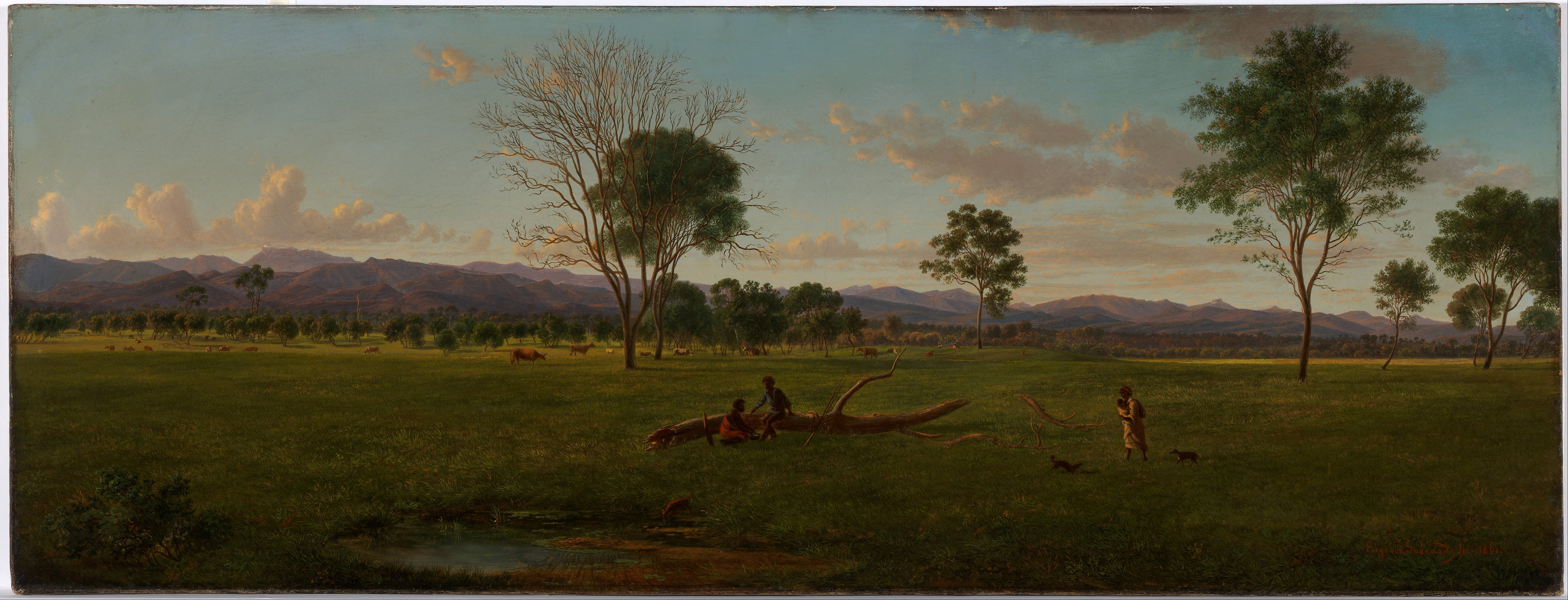
Eugene von Guerard View of the Gippsland Alps, from Bushy Park on the River Avon (1861)
