= Rokeby to Crossover Rail Trail =

Rail trail in Victoria, Australia

The Rokeby to Crossover Rail Trail is a shared use bike path following the former Noojee railway line between the small townships of Rokeby and Crossover in Gippsland, Australia. It is about 4 kilometres long. Another one-kilometre section of trail on the other side of Rokeby has also been converted to rail trail and is known as the Rokeby Flora and Fauna Rail Trail.

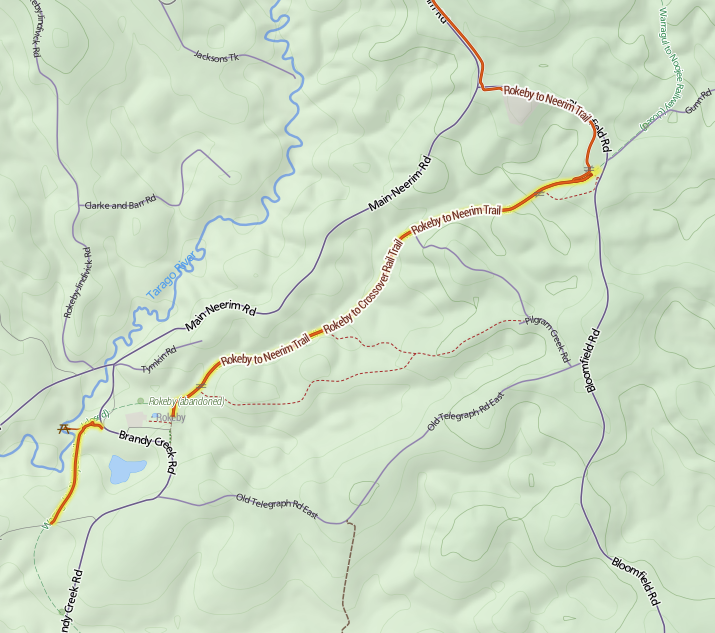
Map of the Rokeby-Crossover Rail Trail.
