= Albert River (Victoria) =

River in Victoria, Australia

Albert (Lurt'bit)
- Mouth of the Albert River in Victoria
- Etymology: In honour of Prince Albert
- Native name: Lurt'bit (Kurnai)

Location
- Country: Australia
- State: Victoria
- Region: South East Coastal Plain (IBRA), South Gippsland
- Local government area: Shire of Wellington

Physical characteristics
- Source: Strzelecki Ranges
  - location: below Madalya
  - coordinates: 37°53′22″S 146°20′45″E
  - elevation: 212 m (696 ft)
- Mouth: Corner Inlet, Bass Strait
  - location: near Port Albert
  - coordinates: 38°29′42″S 146°26′51″E
  - elevation: 0 m (0 ft)
- Length: 39 km (24 mi)

Basin features
- River system: West Gippsland catchment
- Tributaries
  - left: Jack River
  - right: Billy Creek (Victoria)
- Waterfall: Albert River Falls

The Albert River (Brataualung: Lurt'bit) is a perennial river of the West Gippsland catchment, in the South Gippsland region of the Australian state of Victoria.

== Course and features ==
The Albert River rises below Madalya, on the eastern slopes of the Strzelecki Ranges, in a state forestry area. The river flows in a highly meandering course generally east by south, joined by the Jack River and one minor tributary, before reaching its mouth and emptying into the Corner Inlet of Bass Strait near the town of Port Albert in the Shire of Wellington. The river descends 211 metres (692 ft) over its 39-kilometre (24 mi) course.

The South Gippsland Highway traverses the river, south of Alberton. The Albert River sub-catchment area is managed by the West Gippsland Catchment Management Authority.

== Etymology ==
In the Aboriginal Brataualung language the river is named as Lurt'bit, with no clearly defined meaning.

The river was visited in 1841 by William Adams Brodribb, an early settler, and named in honour of Prince Albert.

== See also ==
- List of rivers of Australia § Victoria
