= Franklin River (Victoria) =

Darby
- Mouth of the Franklin River in Victoria

Location
- Country: Australia
- State: Victoria
- Region: South East Coastal Plain (IBRA), South Gippsland
- Local government area: South Gippsland Shire
- Settlements: Wonga, Port Franklin

Physical characteristics
- Source: Strzelecki Ranges
  - location: south of Gunyah Gunyah
  - coordinates: 38°31′18″S 146°18′43″E
  - elevation: 452 m (1,483 ft)
- Mouth: Corner Inlet, Bass Strait
  - location: Port Franklin
  - coordinates: 38°42′24″S 146°17′35″E
  - elevation: 0 m (0 ft)
- Length: 33 km (21 mi)
- Discharge
  - location: mouth

Basin features
- River system: West Gippsland catchment

The Franklin River, a perennial river of the West Gippsland catchment, is located in the South Gippsland region of the Australian state of Victoria.

== Location and features ==
The river rises in the Strzelecki Ranges south of Gunyah Gunyah and flows generally south through steep mountainous terrain in the Strzelecki State Forest in a highly meandering course, until it breaks out into open farmland, joined by one minor tributary, before emptying into the river mouth of Corner Inlet at Port Franklin, and then spilling into Bass Strait. The river descends 452 metres (1,483 ft) over its combined 33-kilometre (21 mi) course.

There are many good fishing spots with good public access.

The river is traversed by the South Gippsland Highway west of Toora.

== See also ==
- List of rivers in Australia
