= Giffard West =

- Town
- Coordinates: 38.3506°S 146.9897°E
- Country: Australia
- State: Victoria
- LGA: Shire of Wellington
- Location: 187.53 km (116.53 mi) E of Melbourne; 28.62 km (17.78 mi) S of Sale

Government
  - State electorate: Gippsland South
  - Federal division: Gippsland

Population
  - Total: 71 (2016 census)
- Postcode: 3851

Giffard West is a locality in Victoria, Australia. It is located 29 km south of Sale. At the 2016 census, Giffard West recorded a population of 71.

== History ==
The Giffard West Hall was opened on 18 December 1918 by Thomas Livingston MLA. Energy company Solis RE has proposed the construction of the Gippsland Renewable Energy Park in Giffard West, which would be Victoria's largest solar farm if built.

== Demographics ==
As of the 2016 census, 71 people resided in Giffard West. The median age of persons in Giffard West was 54 years. There were slightly more females than males, with 50.8% of the population female and 49.2% male. The average household size was 2.3 people per household.
