= Allambee Reserve =

- Town
- Coordinates: 38°18′18″S 146°3′7″E
- Country: Australia
- State: Victoria
- LGA: South Gippsland Shire
- Location: 132.8 km (82.5 mi) SE of Melbourne; 38.1 km (23.7 mi) NE of Leongatha

Government
  - State electorate: Gippsland South
  - Federal division: Monash

Population
  - Total: 96 (2021)
- Postcode: 3871

Allambee Reserve is a locality in South Gippsland Shire, Victoria, Australia. At the 2021 census Allambee Reserve had a population of 96.

== Demographics ==
As of the 2021 Australian census, 96 people resided in Allambee Reserve, up from 95 in the 2016 census. The median age of persons in Allambee Reserve was 44 years. There were more males than females, with 52.2% of the population male and 47.8% female. The average household size was 2.8 people per household.
