= Hollands Landing =

- Town
- Coordinates: 38°03′S 147°28′E
- Country: Australia
- State: Victoria
- LGA: Shire of Wellington
- Location: 263 km (163 mi) E of Melbourne; 50 km (31 mi) E of Sale

Government
  - Federal division: Gippsland

Population
  - Total: 15 (2016 census)
- Postcode: 3862

Hollands Landing is a village in central Gippsland, Victoria, Australia, in the Shire of Wellington.

Hollands Landing is situated at the western end of Lake Victoria on McLennan Strait where it joins Morley Swamp and Lake Wellington in the Gippsland Lakes. It is most popular for fishing and boating, and is suitable for camping, with two nearby caravan parks.

It has a permanent population of 15.
