= Tarwin, Victoria =

Tarwin Victoria
- Coordinates: 38°35′11″S 145°58′46″E
- Population: 56 (2016 census)
- Postcode(s): 3956
- LGA(s): South Gippsland Shire
- State electorate(s): Gippsland South
- Federal division(s): Monash

Tarwin is a small town located in the South Gippsland Shire, in Victoria, Australia. In the 2016 census, Tarwin had a population of 56.
