= Arawata =

- Town
- Coordinates: 38.3951°S 145.8892°E
- Country: Australia
- State: Victoria
- LGA: South Gippsland Shire
- Location: 103.75 km (64.47 mi) SE of Melbourne; 9.97 km (6.20 mi) NW of Leongatha

Government
  - State electorate: Gippsland South
  - Federal division: Monash

Population
  - Total: 92 (2021)
- Postcode: 3951

Arawata is a town in Victoria, Australia. It is located 10 km north-west of Leongatha. During the 2021 census, Arawata recorded a population of 92.

== Demographics ==
As of the 2021 Australian census, 92 people resided in Arawata. The median age of persons in Arawata was 52 years. There were more males than females, with 58.7% of the population male and 41.3% female. The average household size was 2.2 people per household.
