= Port Franklin =

- Town
- Banks of the Franklin River looking south towards Wilsons Promontory

- Coordinates: 38°41′S 146°17′E
- Country: Australia
- State: Victoria
- LGA: South Gippsland Shire
- Location: 182 km (113 mi) SE of Melbourne; 48 km (30 mi) SE of Leongatha; 11 km (6.8 mi) SE of Foster

Government
  - State electorate: Gippsland South
  - Federal division: Monash

Population
  - Total: 134 (2016 census)
- Postcode: 3964

Port Franklin is a small fishing village 182 kilometres (113 mi) south-east of Melbourne in Victoria, Australia. It is about 2 km inland from the coastline of Corner Inlet. At the 2006 census, Port Franklin had a population of 121.

Port Franklin is situated on the banks of the Franklin River between Toora and Foster. The river is lined with small commercial fishing boats, privately owned pleasure craft as well as commercial charter vessels. The local community maintain the public hall, playground, tennis courts and parklands.

The Post Office opened around 1902, was known as Bowen until 1910 and closed in 1993.
