= Wurruk =

- Town
- Coordinates: 38°07′S 147°02′E
- Country: Australia
- State: Victoria
- LGA: Shire of Wellington
- Location: 210 km (130 mi) E of Melbourne; 5 km (3.1 mi) W of Sale; 22 km (14 mi) N of Maffra; 24 km (15 mi) NE of Rosedale

Government
  - State electorate: Gippsland East
  - Federal division: Gippsland

Population
  - Total: 1,112
- Postcode: 3850

Wurruk is a suburb in the Shire of Wellington near Sale in Victoria, Australia. Located on the west side of the Thompson River that separates it from the larger metropolis of Sale. Wurruk is the local indigenous term meaning both 'Earth' and 'story'. Originally known as Wurruk Wurruk the name was simplified at the end of the nineteenth century.

== History ==
The area around Sale was taken up by settlers who followed the explorers Angus McMillan (1839–1841) and Paul Strzelecki (1840). While the township of Sale was helped by the first allotments of land to form the township in 1850. Wurruk remained a rural area for farming. This was due to rich fertile soil that was also prone to flooding.

The growth of Sale put pressure on industry, looking to find affordable land that was conveniently located near the town and transport routes. Large blocks were sold off to build factories.

In 2006 Wurruk had a population of 727. with the opening of land for housing the population grew to 1,077 in 2011. The town has continued to grow with 1,112 citizens by 2016.

== Transport ==
The town has one bus route, created as part of the Sale regional town bus network, linking residents to the Gippsland Shopping Centre.

- Route 3 : Sale - Wurruk via Princes Highway
