= McLoughlins Beach =

- Town
- Coordinates: 38°36′31″S 146°54′14″E
- Country: Australia
- State: Victoria
- LGA: Shire of Wellington

Government
  - State electorate: Gippsland East
  - Federal division: Gippsland
- Elevation: 0 m (0 ft)

Population
  - Total: 121 (2021 census)
- Postcode: 3874
- County: Buln Buln
- Mean max temp: 19.9 °C (67.8 °F)
- Mean min temp: 8.2 °C (46.8 °F)
- Annual rainfall: 739.1 mm (29.10 in)

McLoughlins Beach is a town in South Gippsland, Victoria. At the 2021 census, McLoughlins Beach had a population of 121.

== History ==
The first inhabitants of the area were Brataualung people, a clan of the Kurnai Aboriginal people who live in the Gippsland region of Victoria. The Brataualung have inhabited the forests and coasts around McLoughlins Beach area for thousands of years. They used the waterways as a source of fish and shellfish. Like other nearby coastal towns, McLoughlins Beach is thought have Aboriginal heritage values of significance, although comprehensive studies of the area in this regard have been limited.

European development of the area began in the early 1920s when the original jetty was built, which existed until the 1960s. During that time McLoughlins Beach was a popular fishing village. The current jetty was built in 1967 and the footbridge which gives access to Ninety Mile Beach was constructed in 1972.

== Recreation ==
McLoughlins Beach provides opportunities for estuary, offshore and surf fishing. Facilities that assist with fishing include a boat ramp, a jetty and a footbridge that provides walking access to Ninety Mile Beach. Recreational fishing is popular in both the inlet and from the surf, and frequently caught species include the gummy shark, snapper, flathead, and silver trevally. Local authorities do not recommend swimming at Ninety Mile Beach here although surfers and swimmers can generally be found here in the summer months. Nearby Woodside Beach is more popular for families, as there are surf lifesavers present during the summer months. Walks in the area include a one kilometre return walk along the jetty and boardwalk and a 20 kilometre return walk from McLoughlins Point to Reeves Beach. McLoughlins Beach also has a picnic shelter, playground, public toilets, postal box and public telephone.

== Environment ==
Located near the western end point of Ninety Mile Beach McLoughlins Beach sits on a slight elevation largely surrounded by waterways and mud flats.

Next to and partly surrounding the township is the 73,600 acre (29,800 ha) Nooramunga Marine and Coastal Park. This park has a number of threatened species including the little tern, the white-bellied sea eagle, Lewin's rail, ground parrot (Pezoporus wallicus), swamp skink (Egernia coventryi) and the great egret.

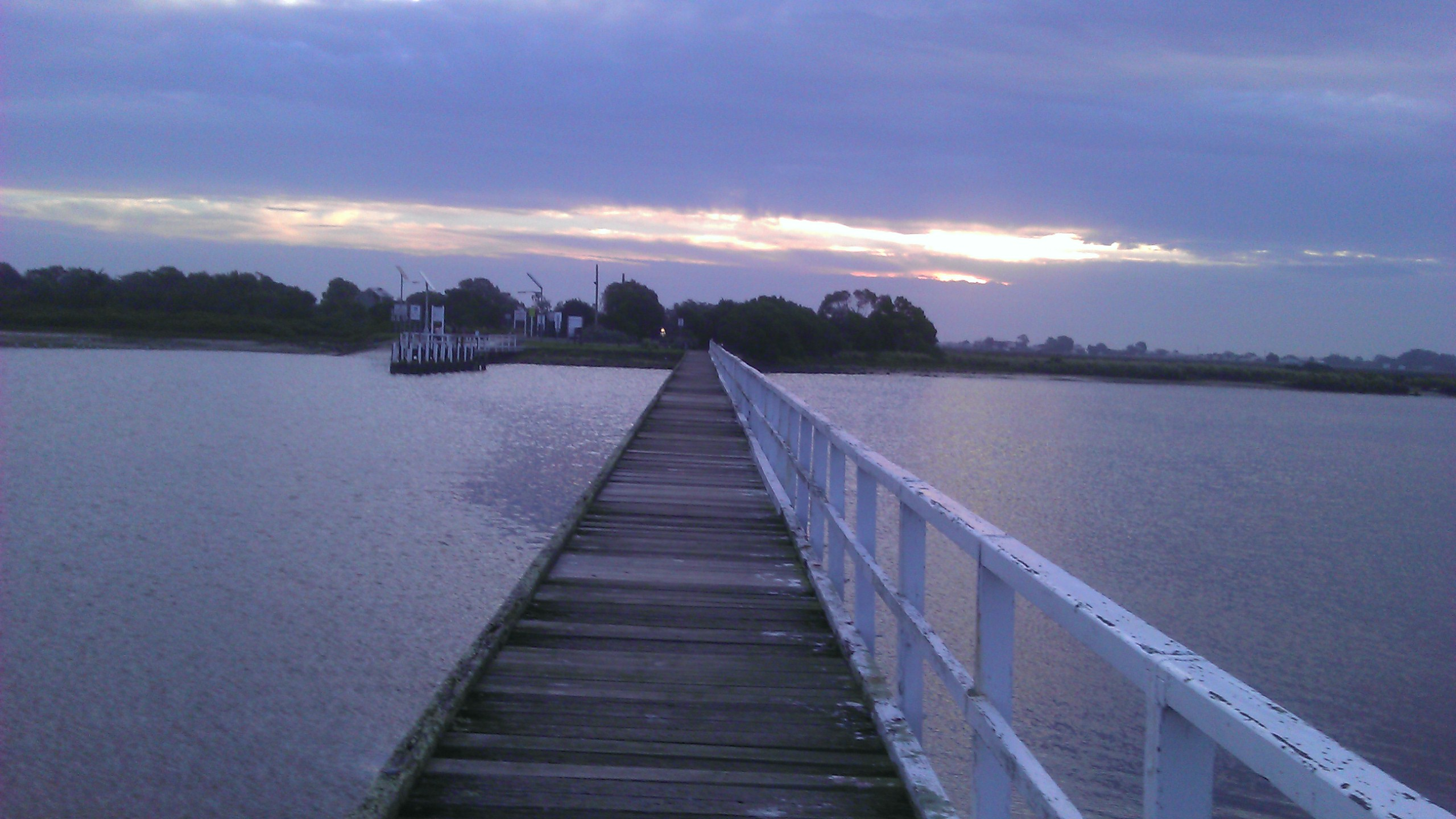
Footbridge to 90 Mile Beach at McLoughlins Beach

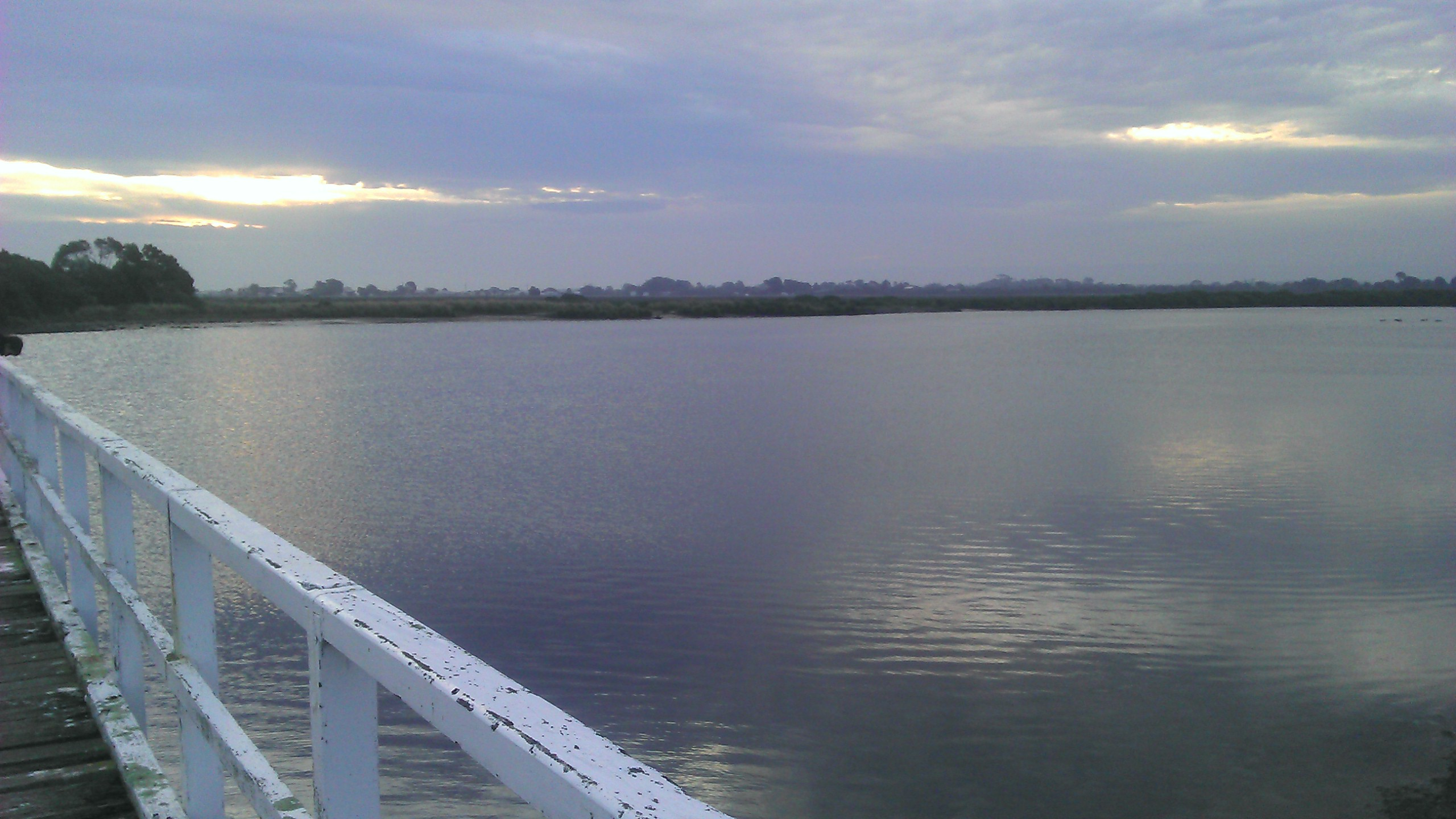
View from footbridge at McLoughlins Beach

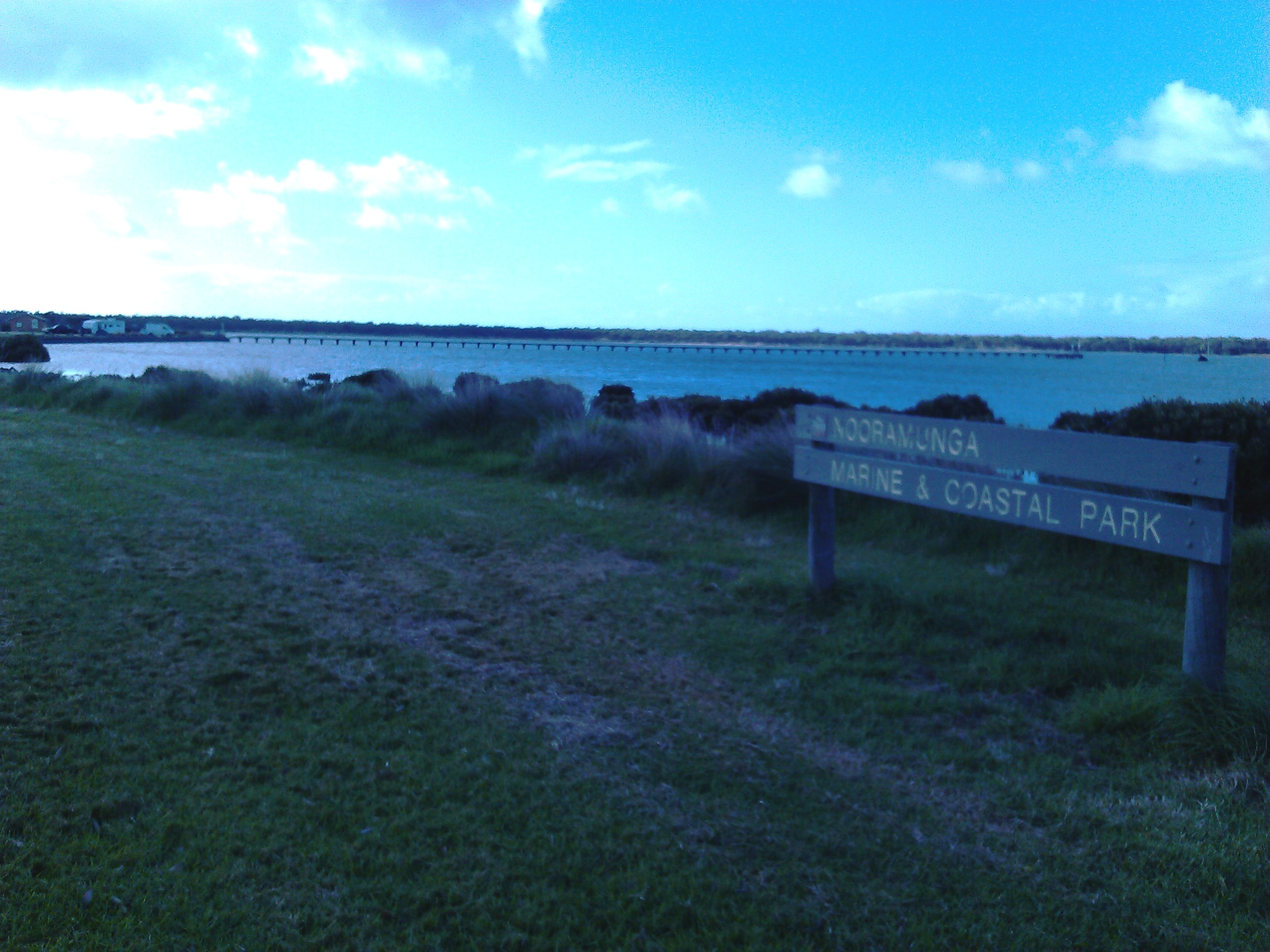
Nooramunga Marine and Coastal Park sign with McLoughlins Beach Jetty

== See also ==
- Wilsons Promontory Marine National Park
