= Kilmany, Victoria =

Kilmany Victoria
- Coordinates: 38°06′S 146°53′E
- Population: 165 (SAL 2021)
- Postcode(s): 3851
- Location: 175 km (109 mi) E of Melbourne; 14 km (9 mi) W of Sale; 10 km (6 mi) E of Rosedale
- LGA(s): Shire of Wellington
Suburbs around Kilmany:
Denison	Nambrok	Fulham
Rosedale	Kilmany	Sale
	Holey Plains	Pearsondale

Kilmany is a locality in eastern Victoria, Australia. Kilmany is known for farming and agriculture. It is 175 km east of Melbourne and 14 km west of Sale.

Nambrok South Post Office opened on 13 January 1913, was renamed Kilmany on 12 May 1913 and closed in 1973.
