= Manns Beach =

- Town
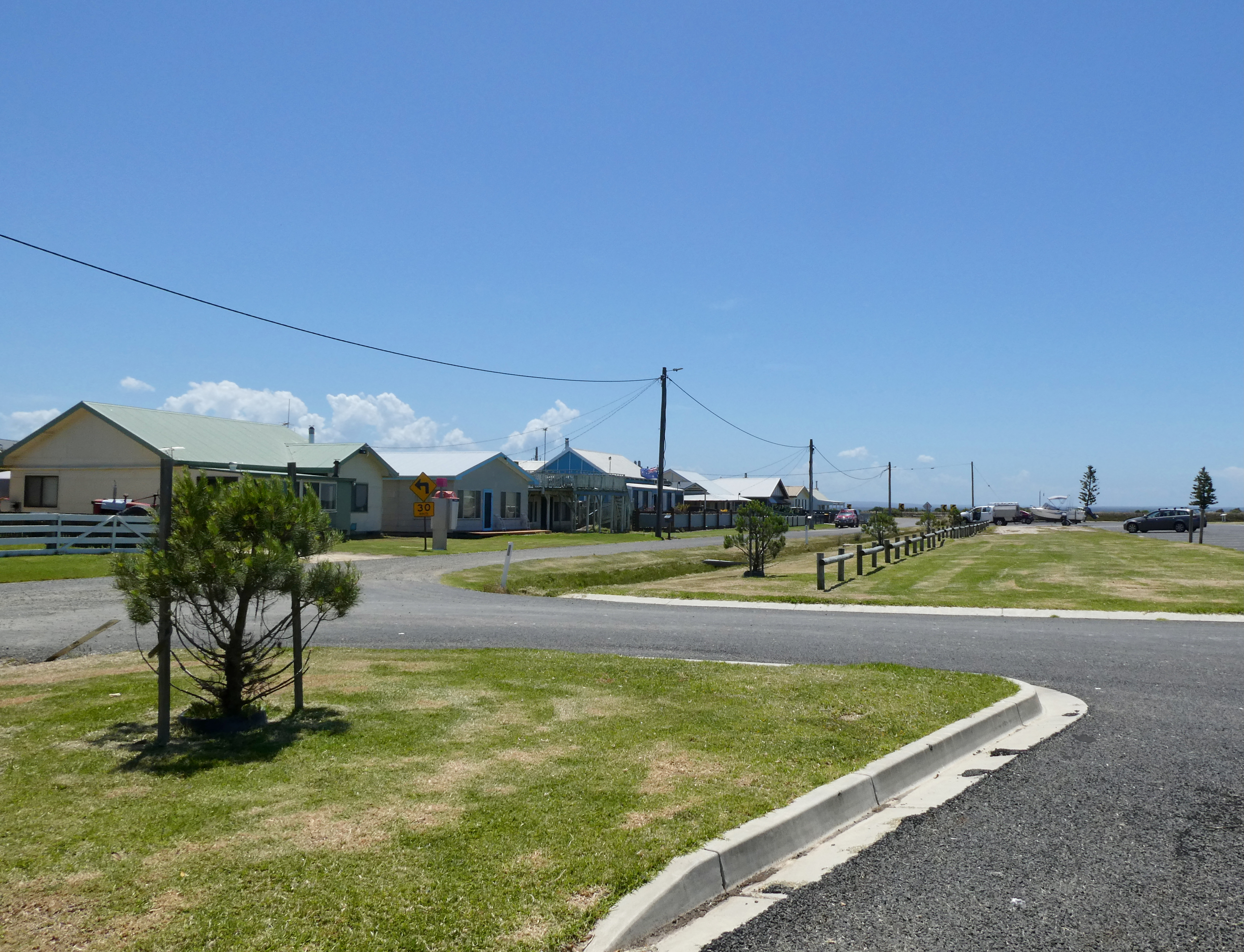
- David Street and jetty car park

- Coordinates: 38°39′S 146°47′E
- Country: Australia
- State: Victoria
- LGA: Shire of Wellington

Government
  - State electorate: Gippsland South
  - Federal division: Gippsland

Population
  - Total: 135 (2006 census)
- Postcode: 3971

Manns Beach is a locality in the Shire of Wellington, Victoria, Australia. The waterbody mouths into offshore waters of Bass Strait. At the 2006 census, Manns Beach had a population of 135.
