= Noojee Trestle Bridge Rail Trail =

Rail trail in Victoria, Australia

Coordinates: 37.90044°S 145.98443°E

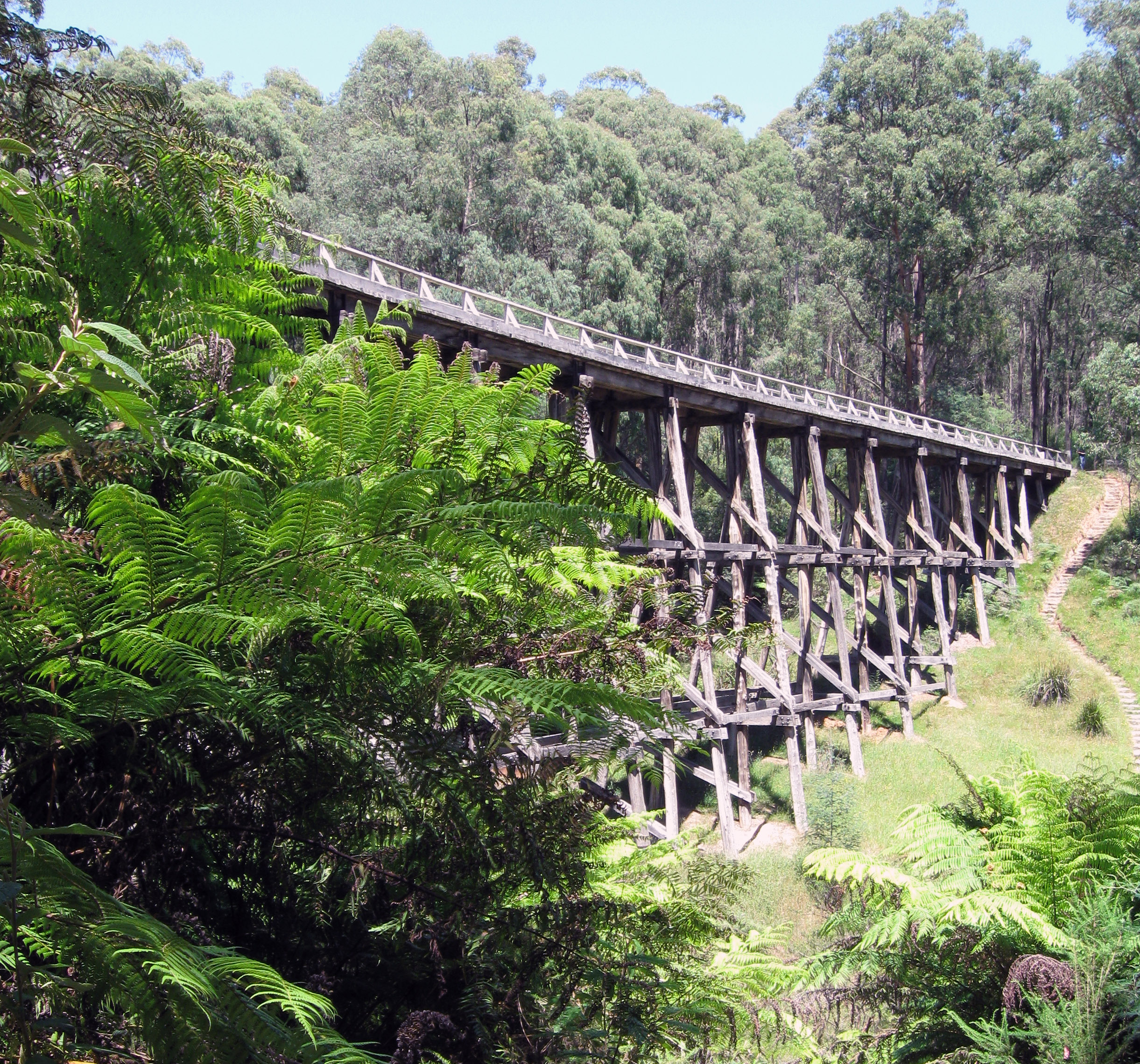

The Noojee Trestle Bridge Rail Trail is a short, 3-kilometre-long (1.9 mi) rail trail in Noojee, Victoria, Australia. As its name suggests, it primarily features an impressive 100-metre-long (330 ft) trestle bridge. The trail follows the alignment of the former Noojee railway line.

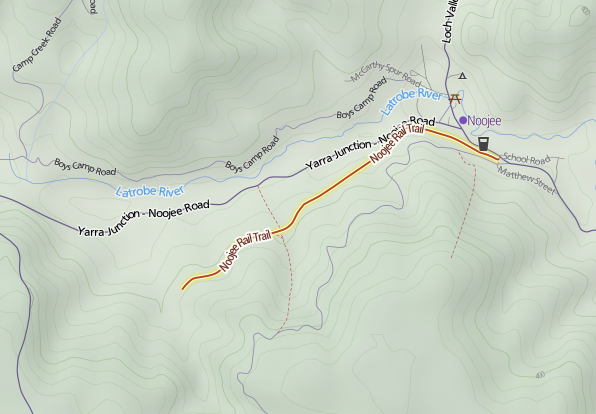
Map of the rail trail
