= South Gippsland Shire =

Coordinates: 38°35′00″S 146°00′00″E

Shire of South Gippsland
- Local government area
- Location in Victoria

- Interactive map of Shire of South Gippsland
- Country: Australia
- State: Victoria
- Region: Gippsland
- Established: 1994
- Council seat: Leongatha

Government
  - Mayor: Cr Nathan Hersey
  - State electorate: Gippsland South
  - Federal division: Monash

Area
  - Total: 3,296 km^{2} (1,273 sq mi)

Population
  - Total: 29,576 (2018)
  - Density: 8.9733/km^{2} (23.241/sq mi)
- Gazetted: 2 December 1994
- Website: Shire of South Gippsland
LGAs around Shire of South Gippsland
Cardinia	Baw Baw	Latrobe
Bass Coast	Shire of South Gippsland	Wellington
Bass Strait	Bass Strait; Flinders Council (Tasmania)	Bass Strait

The South Gippsland Shire is a local government area in Victoria, Australia, located in the south-eastern part of the state. It covers an area of 3,296 square kilometres (1,273 mi^{2}) and, in June 2018, had a population of 29,576. It includes the towns of Leongatha, Korumburra, Foster, Poowong, Mirboo North and Meeniyan.

The Shire is governed and administered by the South Gippsland Shire Council; its seat of local government and administrative centre is located at the council headquarters in Leongatha, it also has a service centre located in Mirboo North. The Shire is named after the Gippsland region, in which the LGA occupies the southernmost portion, including Wilsons Promontory at the southern tip of the Australian continent.

== History ==
The South Gippsland Shire was formed in 1994 from the amalgamation of the former Shire of South Gippsland with the Shire of Mirboo and most of the Shire of Korumburra and Shire of Woorayl.

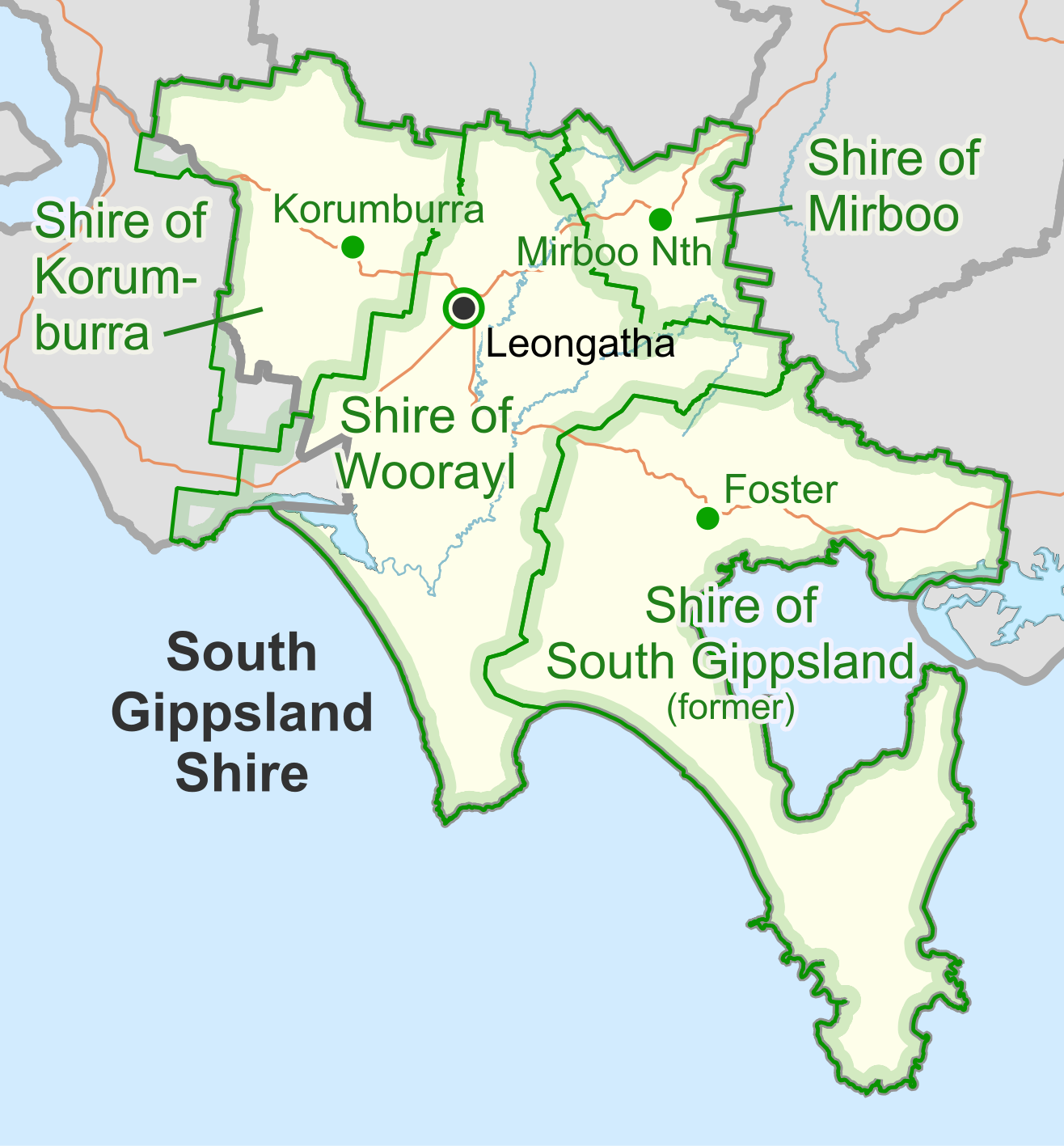
South Gippsland Shire's predecessor LGAs (green) as they were in 1994. The administrative centres of the former LGAs are marked by green dots.

== Council ==
=== Current composition ===
The council is composed of three wards and nine councillors, with three councillors per ward elected to represent each ward. The entire council were sacked by the state government on 19 June 2019 due to bullying allegations and general dysfunctionality. The council was run by administrators until 2021 when a new council was elected.

Ward	2016 election			Council before dismissal			2021 election			
Ward	Councillor		Party	Councillor		Party	Councillor		Party	
Ward	Coastal-Promontory		Alysson Skinner	Independent		Alysson Skinner	Independent		Scott Rae	Independent
	Coastal-Promontory	Ray Argento	Independent		Ray Argento	Independent		Mohya Davies	Independent	
	Coastal-Promontory	Jeremy Rich	Independent		Matthew Sherry	United Australia		Sarah Gilligan	Independent	
Strzelecki		Lorraine Brunt	Independent		Frank Hirst	Independent		Jenni Keerie	Independent	
Strzelecki		Andrew McEwen	Independent		Andrew McEwen	Independent		Mick Felton	Independent	
Strzelecki		Aaron Brown	Independent		Aaron Brown	Independent		Nathan Hersey	Ind. Liberal	
Tarwin Valley		Meg Edwards	Ind. Liberal		Steve Finlay	Independent		John Schelling	Independent	
Tarwin Valley		Don Hill	Independent		Don Hill	Independent		Clare Williams	Independent	
Tarwin Valley		Maxine Kiel	Independent		Rosemary Cousin	Greens		Adrian Darakai	Independent	

=== Administration and governance ===
The council meets in the council chambers at the council headquarters in the Leongatha Municipal Offices, which is also the location of the council's administrative activities. It also provides customer services at both its administrative centre in Leongatha, and its service centre in Mirboo North.

== Election results ==
=== 2021 ===
2021 South Gippsland Shire Council election
Party	Votes	%	Swing	Seats	Change
Independent	18,731	87.02		8	Steady
Greens	1,518	7.05		0	Steady
Independent Liberal	1,518	5.93		1	Steady
Formal votes	21,526	96.47			
Informal votes	788	3.53			
Total	22,314	100.0			
Registered voters / turnout	27,376	81.51			

== Townships and localities ==
In the 2021 census, the shire had a population of 30,577, up from 28,703 in the 2016 census.

Population
Locality	2016	2021
Agnes	57	61
Allambee Reserve^	95	96
Arawata	79	92
Baromi	127	149
Bena	294	303
Bennison	43	42
Berrys Creek	152	174
Binginwarri^	130	134
Boolarong	15	5
Boorool	51	54
Buffalo	272	284
Darlimurla^	30	46
Delburn^	32	37
Dollar	57	61
Dumbalk	413	455
Dumbalk North	95	90
Fairbank	41	52
Fish Creek	827	858
Foster	1,842	2,044
Foster North	165	152
Gunyah	4	0
Hallston	156	157
Hazel Park	41	55
Hedley^	125	108
Inverloch^	5,437	6,526
Jeetho	106	124
Jumbunna	127	150
Kardella	172	169
Kardella South	108	135
Kongwak^	197	207
Koonwarra	404	366
Koorooman	105	115
Korumburra	4,469	4,749
Korumburra South	103	114
Krowera^	108	134
Lang Lang^	1,585	2,556
Leongatha	5,654	5,869
Leongatha North	138	141
Leongatha South	628	616
Loch^	638	707
Mardan	210	248
Meeniyan	771	840
Middle Tarwin	95	91
Mirboo^	290	334
Mirboo North	2,197	2,263
Mount Best	16	46
Mount Eccles	104	139
Mount Eccles South	*	#
Moyarra	*	#
Nerrena	248	238
Nyora^	1,527	1,644
Outtrim^	235	270
Poowong	643	717
Poowong East^	82	88
Poowong North^	186	202
Port Franklin	134	174
Port Welshpool	209	220
Pound Creek^	104	126
Ranceby	71	83
Ruby	188	187
Sandy Point	270	312
Stony Creek	6	0
Strzelecki^	89	107
Tarwin	56	59
Tarwin Lower	358	462
Thorpdale South^	30	27
Tidal River	*	#
Toora	681	713
Toora North	103	107
Trida^	62	87
Turtons Creek	30	33
Venus Bay	944	904
Walkerville	84	130
Walkerville North	5	5
Walkerville South	3	13
Waratah Bay	56	48
Welshpool	331	361
Whitelaw	29	30
Wild Dog Valley	62	78
Wilsons Promontory	13	16
Wonga	33	44
Woorarra East	40	43
Woorarra West	56	48
Wooreen	89	91
Yanakie	251	283

^ - Territory divided with another LGA
* - Not noted in 2016 Census
# - Not noted in 2021 Census

== See also ==
List of localities (Victoria)
