= Woodside Beach =

- Town
- Coordinates: 38°33′S 146°59′E
- Country: Australia
- State: Victoria
- LGA: Shire of Wellington

Government
  - State electorate: Gippsland East
  - Federal division: Gippsland
- Elevation: 0 m (0 ft)

Population
  - Total: 95 (2006 census)
- Postcode: 3874
- County: Buln Buln

Woodside Beach is a locality in the Shire of Wellington, Victoria, Australia. It is approximately 10 km from the town of Woodside, and can be reached by the Woodside Beach Road. Areas of interest surrounding Woodside Beach include Balloong Natural Interest Reserve, Jack Smith Lake and McLoughlins Beach.

Woodside Beach is close to the starting point of the Ninety Mile Beach, which starts at Port Albert and extends to Lakes Entrance. This led to it being the focal point of light car speed trials in 1938. In the 1950s fish stock in the area were notable. Due to its location it can be affected by storm surges, and at various times items from accidents nearby at sea get washed onto the beach.

Woodside Beach is patrolled by volunteers from the Woodside Beach Surf Life Saving Club, which was formed in 1968. It regularly hosts junior lifesaving carnivals, with competing teams including Seaspray and Lakes Entrance.
