= Munro, Victoria =

Munro Victoria
- Coordinates: 37°54′S 147°11′E
- Population: 143 (2016 census)
- Postcode(s): 3862
- Location: 233 km (145 mi) E of Melbourne; 11 km (7 mi) NW of Stratford; 41 km (25 mi) W of Bairnsdale
- LGA(s): Shire of Wellington
- State electorate(s): Gippsland East
- Federal division(s): Gippsland

Munro is a town in Victoria, Australia, located on Munro - Stockdale Road, just north of the Princes Highway eleven kilometres east of Stratford, in the Shire of Wellington.

At the most recent national census, Munro had 143 citizens living within its district. The town has no commercial businesses but it does have a St Mary's Anglican Church.

== Transport ==
Munro is a closed station located on the Bairnsdale railway line in Victoria, Australia. It was 233 km from Southern Cross station.

The passenger platform was abolished by mid 1975, along with the goods platform.
