= Shire of South Gippsland (former) =

Coordinates: 38°39′S 146°12′E

Shire of South Gippsland Victoria
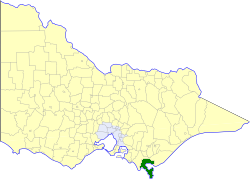
- Location in Victoria
- The former Shire of South Gippsland as at its dissolution in 1994
- Population: 6,180 (1992)
  - Density: 4.315/km^{2} (11.175/sq mi)
- Established: 1894
- Area: 1,432.26 km^{2} (553.0 sq mi)
- Council seat: Foster
- Region: South Gippsland
- County: Buln Buln
LGAs around Shire of South Gippsland:
| Woorayl | Woorayl | Alberton |
| Bass Strait | Shire of South Gippsland | Bass Strait |
| Bass Strait | Bass Strait | Bass Strait |

The Shire of South Gippsland was a local government area about 170 kilometres (106 mi) south-southeast of Melbourne, the state capital of Victoria, Australia. The shire covered an area of 1,432.26 square kilometres (553.0 sq mi), and existed from 1894 until 1994.

== History ==
Originally part of the Alberton Road District, South Gippsland was first incorporated as a shire on 16 February 1894.

On 2 December 1994, the Shire of South Gippsland was abolished, and along with the Shire of Mirboo and parts of the Shires of Korumburra and Woorayl, was merged into the new Shire of South Gippsland.

== Wards ==
South Gippsland was divided into three ridings, each of which elected three councillors:

- West Riding
- Central Riding
- East Riding

== Towns and localities ==
- Boolarong
- Buffalo
- Fish Creek
- Foster*
- Hedley
- Mount Best
- Port Franklin
- Port Welshpool
- Sandy Point
- Tidal River
- Toora
- Waratah Bay
- Welshpool
- Wilsons Promontory
- Woorarra
- Yanakie

* Council seat.

== Population ==
| Year | Population |
|---|---|
| 1954 | 4,882 |
| 1958 | 5,110* |
| 1961 | 5,247 |
| 1966 | 5,411 |
| 1971 | 5,408 |
| 1976 | 5,667 |
| 1981 | 5,999 |
| 1986 | 5,967 |
| 1991 | 5,850 |

* Estimate in the 1958 Victorian Year Book.
