= Shire of Narracan =

Shire of Narracan Victoria
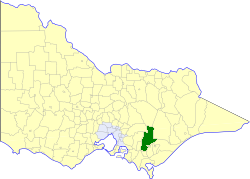
- Location in Victoria
- The Shire of Narracan as at its dissolution in 1994
- Population: 11,380 (1992)
  - Density: 4.95/km^{2} (12.81/sq mi)
- Established: 1878
- Area: 2,300 km^{2} (888.0 sq mi)
- Council seat: Trafalgar
- Region: West Gippsland
- County: Buln Buln, Tanjil
LGAs around Shire of Narracan:
Upper Yarra	Mansfield	Maffra
Buln Buln	Shire of Narracan	Rosedale
Warragul; Woorayl	Mirboo	Morwell

The Shire of Narracan was a local government area about 120 kilometres (75 mi) east-southeast of Melbourne, the state capital of Victoria, Australia. The shire covered an area of 2,300 square kilometres (888.0 sq mi), and existed from 1878 until 1994.

== History ==
Narracan was first incorporated as a shire on 20 September 1878. Due in part to its location at the crossroads of the Latrobe Valley region, many changes occurred to its boundaries, especially from the 1940s onwards, during the post-war industrial boom in the region.

Parts of the shire's South Riding were annexed to the Shire of Morwell on 27 May 1892, while the Shire of Mirboo was created out of parts of its East and West Ridings on 13 April 1894. Over the following years, several parts were annexed to the Shire of Woorayl. On 29 May 1918, it absorbed the Shire of Walhalla, a 1,060 square kilometres (409 sq mi) region which had existed since 1872, firstly as a borough, then as a shire. On 24 September 1947, under the terms of the State Electricity Commission (Yallourn Area) Act 1947, a town was proclaimed on 3.05 square kilometres (754 acres) at the Narracan-Morwell border; this self-governing area, under the auspices of the State Electricity Commission of Victoria, came to be known as the Yallourn Works Area, and at one point housed over 5,000 workers from nearby coal mines.

On 28 August 1955, the Borough of Moe was severed and incorporated, and parts were annexed to Moe on 1 October 1990.

On 2 December 1994, the Shire of Narracan was abolished, and along with the Rural City of Warragul, the Shire of Buln Buln and parts of the Shire of Upper Yarra, were merged into the newly created Shire of Baw Baw. Parts of Yallourn North were merged into City of Latrobe.

== Wards ==
The Shire of Narracan was divided into four ridings, each of which elected three councillors:

- North Riding
- East Riding
- West Riding
- Walhalla Riding

== Towns and localities ==
- Allambee
- Coalville
- Erica
- Moondarra
- Narracan
- Rawson
- Tanjil South
- Thorpdale
- Trafalgar*
- Walhalla
- Willow Grove
- Yallourn North
- Yarragon

* Council seat.

== Population ==
Year	Population
1954	21,023
1958	8,920*
1961	9,343
1966	9,045
1971	8,614
1976	8,566
1981	10,741
1986	10,761
1991	10,903

* Estimate in the 1958 Victorian Year Book.
