= Shire of Rosedale =

- Local government area
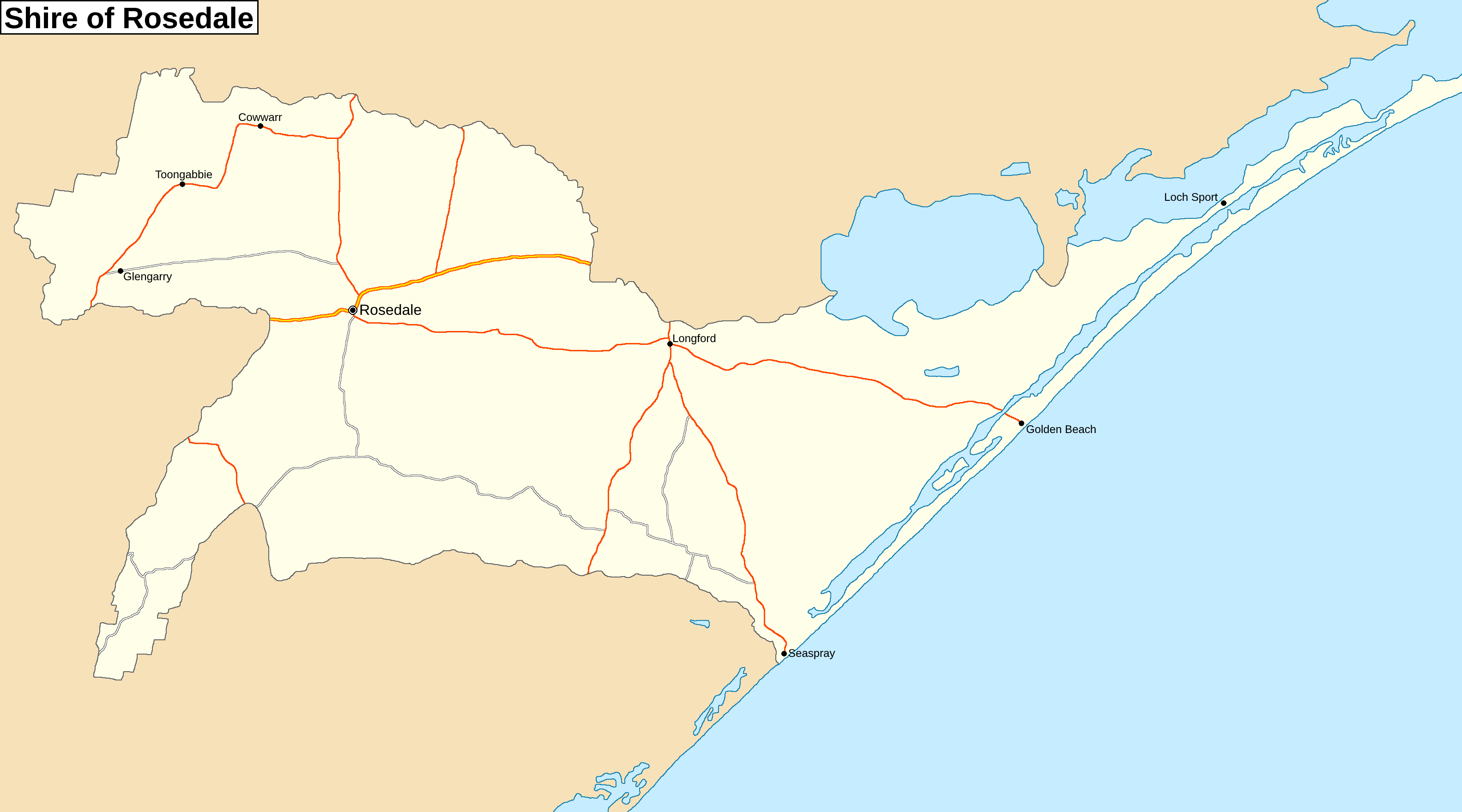
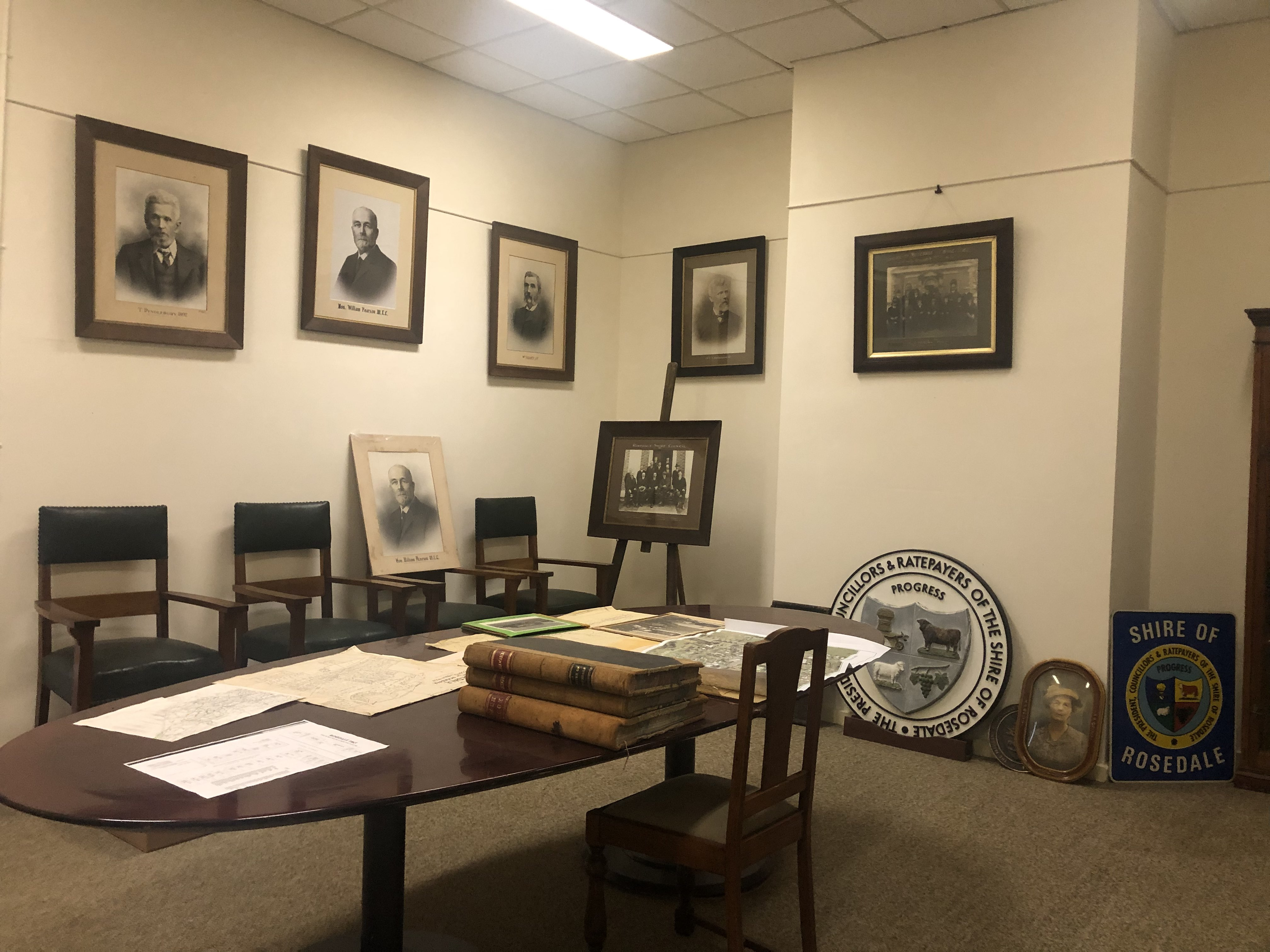
- Map of the shire's boundaries from 1914 to 1994. A former meeting room of Rosedale Shire councillors.

- The Shire of Rosedale as at its dissolution in 1994
- Country: Australia
- State: Victoria
- Region: Central Gippsland
- Established: 1869
- Council seat: Rosedale

Area
  - Total: 2,276.6 km^{2} (879.0 sq mi)

Population
  - Total(s): 9,230 (1992)
  - Density: 4.0543/km^{2} (10.501/sq mi)
- County: Buln Buln, Tanjil
LGAs around Shire of Rosedale
Narracan	Maffra	Avon
Traralgon	Shire of Rosedale	Bass Strait
Alberton	Alberton	Bass Strait

The Shire of Rosedale was a local government area stretching between the towns of Traralgon and Sale, in the Gippsland region of Victoria, Australia. The shire covered an area of 2,276.6 square kilometres (879.0 sq mi), and existed from 1869 until 1994.

== History ==
Rosedale was incorporated as a road district on 26 February 1869, and became a shire on 17 February 1871. It annexed part of the Shire of Alberton on 20 May 1914.

On 2 December 1994, the Shire of Rosedale was abolished, and along with the City of Sale and parts of the Shires of Alberton and Avon, was merged into the newly created Shire of Wellington. The Boole Poole Peninsula south of Metung was transferred to the newly created Shire of East Gippsland, while the Glengarry and Toongabbie districts north of Traralgon were transferred to the newly created Shire of La Trobe.

== Wards ==
The Shire of Rosedale was divided into three ridings, each of which elected three councillors:

- Central Riding
- North Riding
- East Riding

== Towns and localities ==
- Cowwarr
- Denison
- Glengarry
- Golden Beach
- Hiamdale
- Kilmany
- Loch Sport
- Longford
- Nambrok
- Rosedale*
- Seaspray
- Stradbroke
- The Lakes National Park
- Toongabbie
- Willung South

* Council seat.

== Population ==
Year	Population
1954	3,860
1958	4,290*
1961	4,566
1966	4,899
1971	4,955
1976	5,174
1981	6,265
1986	7,591
1991	8,578

* Estimate in the 1958 Victorian Year Book.
