= Shire of Buln Buln =

Coordinates: 38°08′S 145°51′E

Shire of Buln Buln Victoria
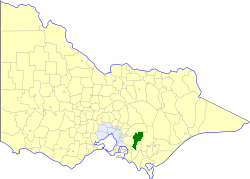
- Location in Victoria
- The Shire of Buln Buln as at its dissolution in 1994
- Population: 11,960 (1992)
  - Density: 9.500/km^{2} (24.604/sq mi)
- Established: 1878
- Area: 1,259 km^{2} (486.1 sq mi)
- Council seat: Drouin
- Region: West Gippsland
- County: Buln Buln, Mornington
LGAs around Shire of Buln Buln:
Upper Yarra	Upper Yarra	Upper Yarra
Pakenham	Shire of Buln Buln	Narracan
Pakenham	Korumburra	Warragul

The Shire of Buln Buln was a local government area about 95 kilometres (59 mi) east-southeast of Melbourne, the state capital of Victoria, Australia. The shire covered an area of 1,259 square kilometres (486.1 sq mi), and existed from 1878 until 1994.

== History ==
Buln Buln was first incorporated as a shire on 20 September 1878. Its eastern part split away on 9 December 1881, to form the Shire of Warragul (Warragul was proclaimed a rural city in 1990), while its southern part split away on 29 May 1891, to form the Shire of Korumburra. Parts in its southwest, around the town of Lang Lang, were annexed to the Shire of Cranbourne on 21 March 1892 and 27 January 1893.

A comprehensive history of the shire, Buln Buln, was written by Graeme Butler in 1979.

On 2 December 1994, the Shire of Buln Buln was abolished, and along with the Rural City of Warragul, the Shire of Narracan, and parts of the Shire of Upper Yarra, was merged into the newly created Shire of Baw Baw.

== Wards ==
The Shire of Buln Buln was divided into four ridings on 30 April 1958, each of which elected three councillors:

- Neerim Riding
- North Drouin Riding
- South Drouin Riding
- Longwarry Riding

== Towns and localities ==
- Drouin*
- Drouin South
- Drouin West
- Hallora
- Icy Creek
- Jindivick
- Labertouche
- Lardner
- Longwarry
- Mountain View
- Nayook
- Neerim South
- Noojee
- Poowong East
- Ripplebrook
- Tarago

* Council seat.

== Population ==
Year	Population
1954	8,015
1958	8,400*
1961	8,427
1966	8,668
1971	8,414
1976	8,361
1981	9,062
1986	10,210
1991	11,137

* Estimate in the 1958 Victorian Year Book.
