= Noojee railway line =

Former railway line in Victoria, Australia

Noojee

Service
- Type: V/Line passenger service

History
- Opened: 12 May 1890 (Warragul to Rokeby), 18 March 1892 (Rokeby to Neerim South), 27 March 1917 (Neerim South to Nayook), 26 April 1919 (Nayook to Noojee)
- Completed: 1919
- Closed: 27 March 1954 (Nayook to Noojee), 1 October 1958 (Warragul to Nayook)

Technical
- Num of tracks: Single
Route map
VR map 1947 Noojee.jpg

The Noojee railway line is a closed railway line in Victoria, Australia. Branching off from the Gippsland line at Warragul station, it was built to service the timber industry in the upper Latrobe River area, transporting timber as well as providing a general goods and passenger service to townships in the area. The final section of the line between Neerim South and Noojee traversed increasingly hilly terrain and featured a number of large timber trestle bridges. Extensively and repeatedly damaged by bushfires over the years, the line was closed in the 1950s and dismantled. The last remaining large trestle bridge on the line has been preserved and has become a popular local tourist attraction.

== History ==
Only a few years after the opening of the Gippsland mainline to Sale, townships along the upper reaches of the Latrobe River began to petition for a branch line to be built to service the area and by 1885 a route had been approved by Parliament from Warragul via Buln Buln. There was some dispute regarding the route, with a deputation meeting the Minister for Railways in 1888 to request the line be built from Longwarry rather than Warragul, following the Tarago River along an easier alignment and providing a shorter route to Melbourne. The Premier, Duncan Gillies, advised that the route could not be changed, and the line opened in sections with Warragul to Rokeby opened on 12 May 1890, and Rokeby to Neerim South on 18 March 1892.

Before the year was out, representations were being made to extend the line from Neerim South to Neerim proper. However, the line progressed no further as the Railways Standing Committee found that traffic on the proposed 5-mile (8.0 km) extension would not justify the £19,000 ($38,000) expenditure. Options for a more cheaply built extension, including the possibility of it being built as a narrow gauge railway were to be considered.

With the opening up of Crown lands in the Noojee and Fumina districts in the early 20th century, areas with poor rail and road transport, there was a renewed push for the railway to be completed. Extension of the line to Noojee via Neerim and Nayook had commenced by 1915, and on 27 March 1917 the 8-mile (13 km) long extension was opened from Neerim South to Nayook, climbing from an elevation of 669 feet (204 m) to 1,430 feet (440 m). Construction continued on the final 5-mile (8.0 km) section into Noojee, over which the line descended 669 feet (204 m), and it was opened on 26 April 1919.

There was considerable optimism for the future prospects for the railway. The Argus newspaper reported that in addition to timber traffic paying its way, the line, which extended "into a most picturesque part of Gippsland", would soon develop a profitable tourist traffic.

However, even as the railway was being officially opened, the roads that would ultimately lead to its closure were already on the way. John Mackey, the Speaker of the Victorian Legislative Assembly and member for West Gippsland, announced during the opening ceremony that the Country Roads Board had made funds available for the building of roads into the region and was now awaiting contractors willing to undertake the construction works.

With the completion of the railway into Noojee, timber production in the area boomed. More than 200 kilometres of narrow gauge tramways were built to link the surrounding mills to the railway terminus. At least 28 timber mills were in operation between 1919 and 1926, when bushfires swept through the region and destroyed the township.

=== Infrastructure ===
The 5 ft 3 in (1,600 mm) broad gauge line was built to Victorian Railways "light lines" standard with 60 lb/yd (30 kg/m) rail. The ruling gradient was 1 in 40 between Warragul and Neerim South, and 1 in 30 between Neerim South and Noojee. As of 1923, it featured three turntables along its length: a 50 ft (15 m) table at Neerim South, and 53 ft (16 m) tables at Nayook and Noojee. Passenger trains were permitted to travel at speeds of up to 40 miles per hour (64 km/h), while goods trains were restricted to 25 miles per hour (40 km/h)

=== Services ===
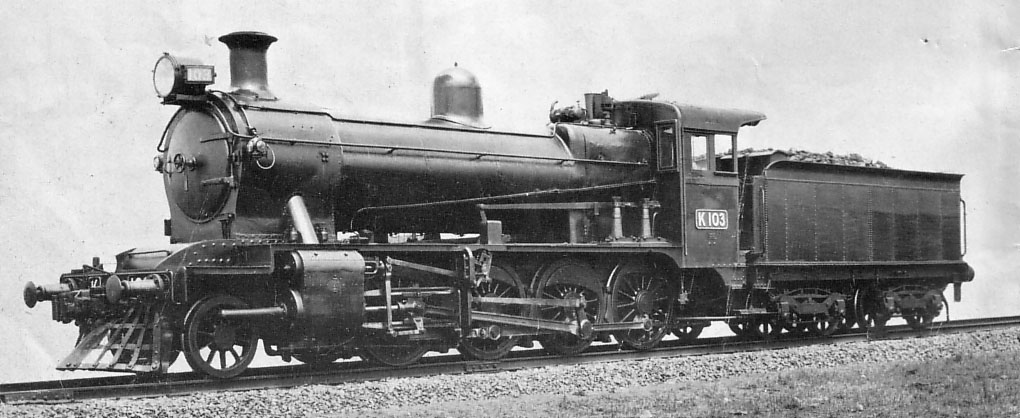
Victorian Railways K class locomotive, circa 1935 with electric headlight and automatic coupler

The line saw the use of Victorian Railways V class 2-8-0, K class 2-8-0 and N class 2-8-2 steam locomotives.

Passenger services were relatively slow, as was the case for many branch lines where a mixed goods and passenger train service was provided. Victorian Railways passenger timetable of 1928 shows a travel time from Melbourne to Noojee of approximately six hours for the 88 3/4 mi (142.8 km) journey from Flinders Street station, which included lengthy stops at Warragul and Neerim South.

Although by 1930 services into Noojee had only been running for just over ten years, Victorian Railways, faced with mounting losses that would result in a record £1 million deficit (almost $85,000,000 in 2020), announced the closure of the daily passenger rail service from 30 June 1930. It was replaced by twice-daily road motor services, with a journey time reduced by two hours, and additional services were available for market days on Thursdays. Use of the railway line was reduced to the three goods trains per week needed to clear goods traffic.

=== Bushfire damage ===
With much of the line traversing dense eucalyptus forests, the line and the towns it served were at high risk of bushfire damage.

In February 1926, the town of Noojee (including the railway station) and much of the line from Nayook was destroyed in the Black Sunday bushfires. The line was closed for repairs until 17 May 1926, with a road motor service being provided in the interim.

The town was again razed by fire in the Black Friday bushfires of Friday 13 January 1939, along with three of the large trestle bridges on the railway line between Nayook and Noojee. Of the £20,000 damage caused to Victorian Railways by the 1939 fires, the Noojee trestle was the most serious loss, with repairs taking several months.

=== Closure ===
The lightly trafficked line was closed beyond Nayook on 27 March 1954. The section was last used when residents travelled by train to Warragul on 3 March 1954 to see Queen Elizabeth II during her first visit to Australia. The remaining section between Nayook and Warragul was closed in 1958.

== Preservation ==
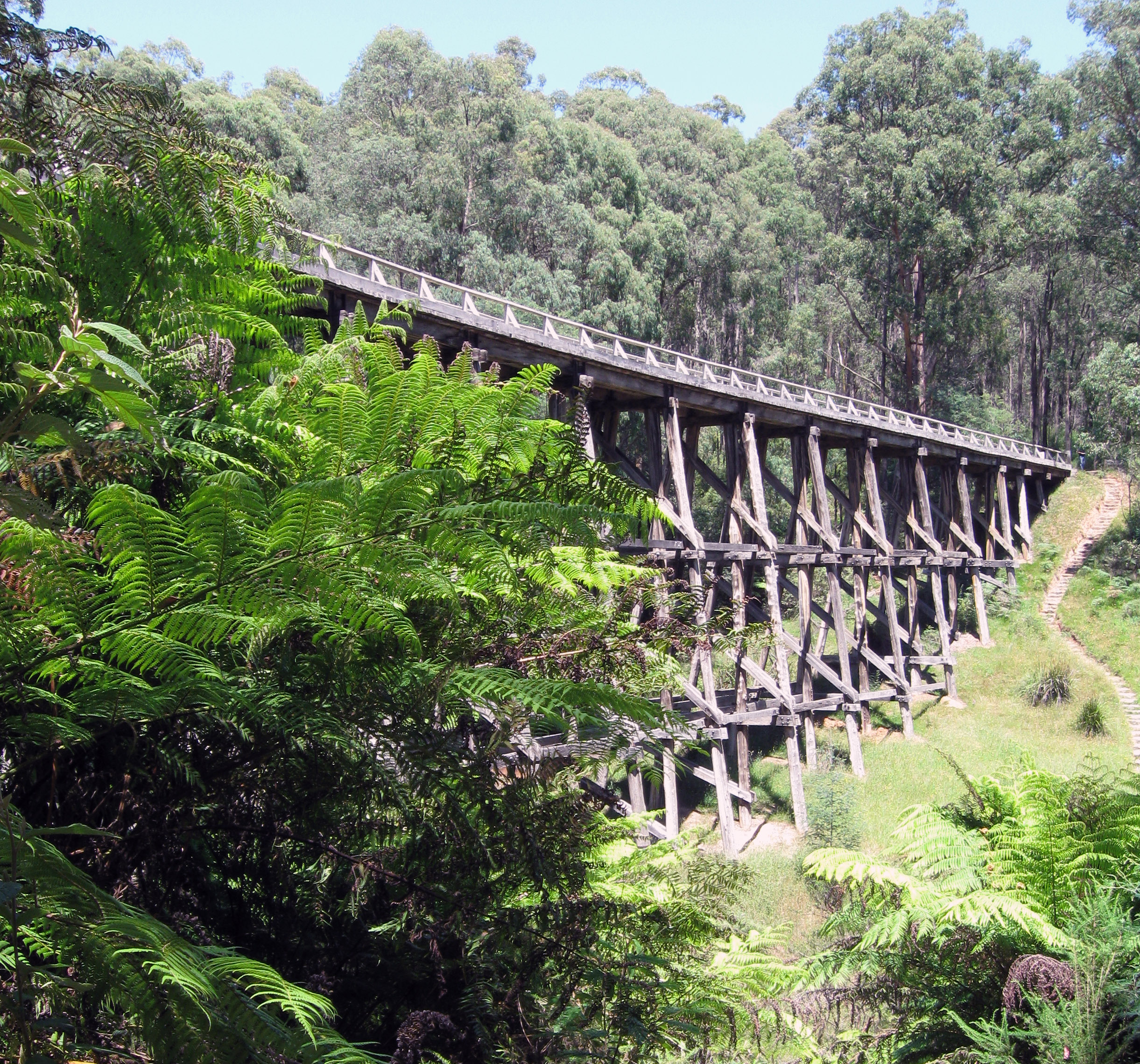
Preserved Noojee trestle bridge, December 2009

After closure, the tracks and station buildings along the line were dismantled and many sections of the right of way were sold off. The Buln Buln Shire Council purchased the No. 7 Noojee trestle bridge from Victorian Railways for the nominal sum of £1 ($2). This historic eighteen-span structure, 102 m (335 ft) long and 20 m (66 ft) high, was one of three rebuilt in 1939 after the original structures were razed by the Black Friday bushfires. Architecturally significant as the tallest surviving timber trestle bridge in Victoria and a unique and intact example of trestle bridge construction, it is now registered with the National Trust of Australia.

Approximately 3 kilometres (2 mi) of the rail formation around the Noojee Trestle Bridge has been converted into the Noojee Trestle Bridge Rail Trail. Further south towards Warragul, approximately 4 kilometres (2.5 mi) of the formation has been converted into the Rokeby to Crossover Rail Trail.

In April 2012, the Noojee and District Historical Society were successful in a bid to relocate J class steam locomotive J550 from Warragul to Noojee for eventual restoration. The bid for the locomotive was part of a project to create an historical park in Noojee, featuring a restored rail line from Noojee railway station to the trestle bridge.

On 24 March 2013, J550 was moved by road to Noojee and placed on a section of track at the site of the former railway station.

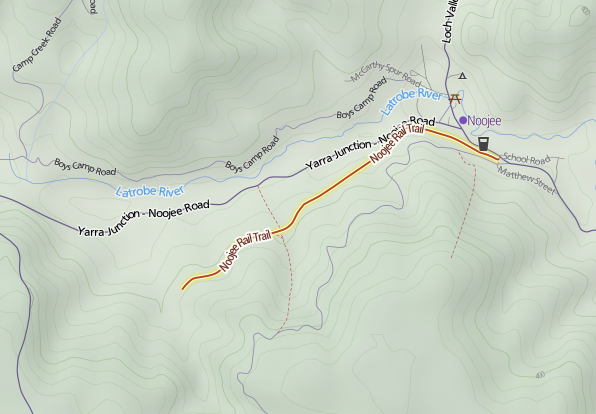
Map of the Noojee Trestle Bridge Rail Trail.

== Line guide ==
Distances from Southern Cross station shown
