= Buln Buln, Victoria =

Buln Buln Victoria
- Coordinates: 38°05′0″S 145°56′0″E
- Population: 548 (2016 census)
- Postcode(s): 3821
- Location: 113 km (70 mi) SE of Melbourne; 8 km (5 mi) N of Warragul
- LGA(s): Shire of Baw Baw
- State electorate(s): Narracan
- Federal division(s): Monash

Buln Buln is a town in West Gippsland, approximately 8 kilometres north of Warragul. At the 2021 Census, Buln Buln had a population of 551.

== Etymology ==
buln buln is the Woiwurrung–Taungurung word for the superb lyrebird.

== History ==
The post office opened as Brandy Creek on 1 April 1873 and became Buln Buln in 1874 (closing in 1973). A Telegraph Office was opened in March 1877.

The Buln Buln Railway Station was operational from 1890 to 1958, as part of the Noojee railway line.

== Today ==
The playing colours of the Buln Buln Football Club

The town has an Australian rules football team competing in the Ellinbank & District Football League, the Buln Buln Lyrebirds, dating back at least to World War I. Along with the Football Club they also have a Netball Club who are also in the Ellinbank & District Netball Association, as well as a Cricket Club and Tennis Club.

Buln Buln Primary School was established in 1878. In 2021 it had an enrollment of 170. Its motto is "our children, our community, our future", and its symbol is a superb lyrebird.

== See also ==
- County of Buln Buln
- List of reduplicated Australian place names
