= Jack River, Victoria =

Jack River Victoria
- Coordinates: 38°34′13″S 146°33′14″E
- Population: 301 (2011 census)
- Postcode(s): 3971
- Elevation: 42 m (138 ft)
- Location: 170 km (106 mi) ESE of Melbourne; 84 km (52 mi) SW of Sale; 6 km (4 mi) W of Yarram
- LGA(s): Shire of Wellington
- State electorate(s): Gippsland South
- Federal division(s): Gippsland

Jack River is a locality in the Shire of Wellington, Victoria, Australia. Jack River is located approximately 170 kilometres (110 mi) east southeast of Melbourne.

At the 2011 census, Jack River had a population of 301.
