= Shire of Wellington =

Coordinates: 37°53′00″S 146°59′00″E

- Local government area
- Location in Victoria

- Interactive map of Shire of Wellington
- Country: Australia
- State: Victoria
- Region: Gippsland
- Established: 1994
- Council seat: Sale

Government
  - Mayor: Cr Scott Rossetti
  - State electorates: Gippsland East; Gippsland South
  - Federal division: Gippsland

Area
  - Total: 10,817 km^{2} (4,176 sq mi)

Population
  - Total: 44,019 (2018)
  - Density: 4.06943/km^{2} (10.5398/sq mi)
- Gazetted: 2 December 1994
- Website: Shire of Wellington
LGAs around Shire of Wellington
Mansfield; Wangaratta	Alpine	East Gippsland
Baw Baw; Latrobe	Shire of Wellington	East Gippsland
South Gippsland	Bass Strait	Bass Strait

The Shire of Wellington is a local government area (LGA) in Victoria, Australia, located in the eastern part of the state. It covers an area of 10,817 square kilometres (4,176 mi^{2}) and, in June 2018, had a population of 44,019. It includes the major towns of Heyfield, Rosedale, Maffra, Sale, Stratford and Yarram.

The Shire is governed and administered by the Wellington Shire Council. Its seat of local government and administrative centre is located at the council headquarters in Sale; it also has service centres located in Maffra, Stratford and Rosedale. The Shire is named after a major geographical feature in the region, Lake Wellington, which is located in the south-east of the LGA.

== History ==
The Shire of Wellington was formed in 1994 from the amalgamation of the Shire of Alberton, Shire of Avon, Shire of Maffra and City of Sale, as well as the vast bulk of the Shire of Rosedale. The Glengarry and Toongabbie districts in Rosedale's west were combined with the La Trobe Shire (now City of Latrobe), while the Boole Poole area at the shire's eastern tip was amalgamated into the East Gippsland Shire.

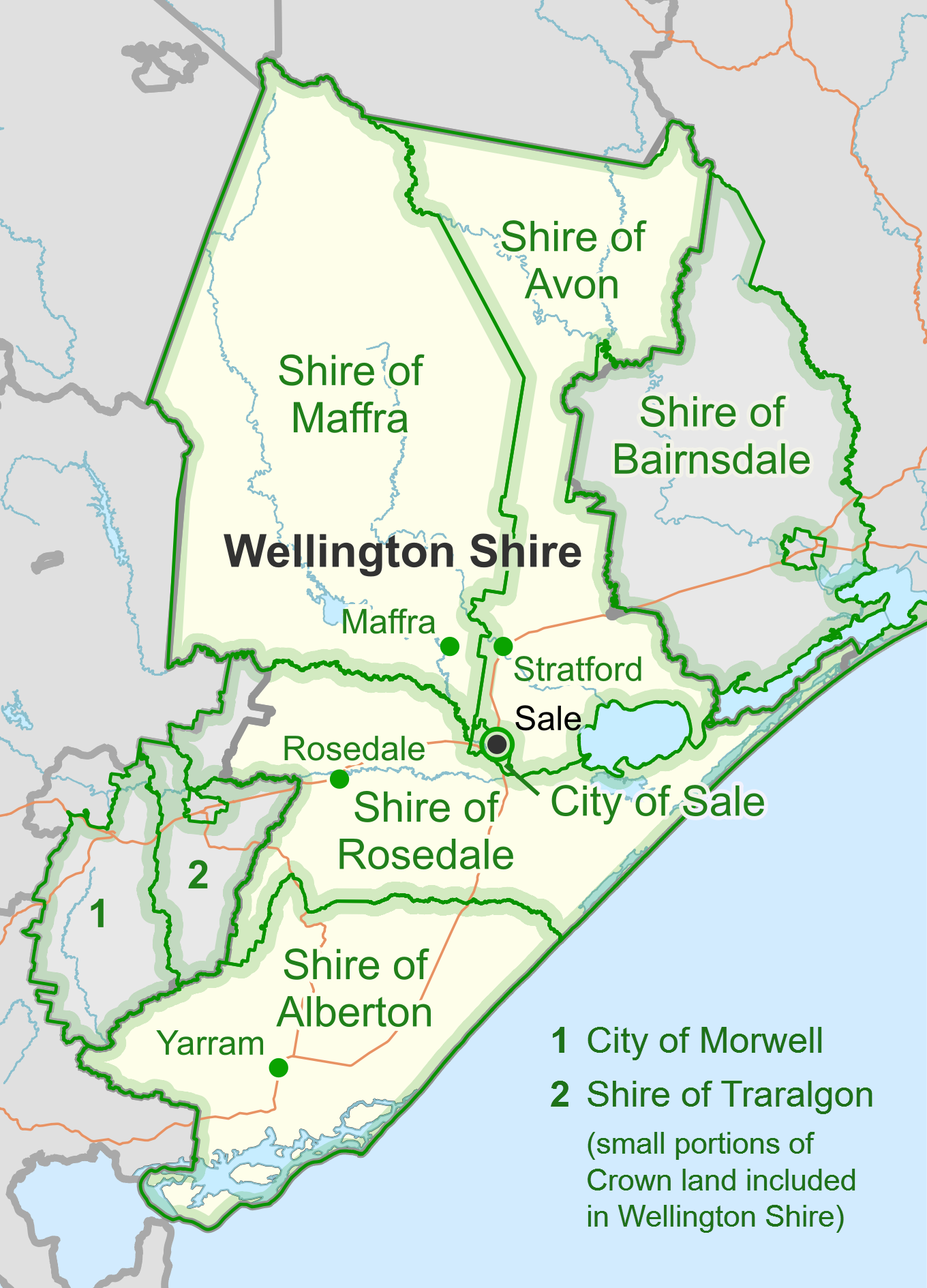
Wellington Shire's predecessor LGAs (green) as they were in 1994. The administrative centres of the former LGAs are marked by green dots.

== Council ==
=== Current composition ===
Wellington Shire Council is composed of three wards and nine councillors, with three councillors per ward elected to represent each ward.

Ward	Councillor	Party	Notes
Northern	Edward Lowe	Independent	
Northern	Carmel Ripper	Independent	
Northern	John Tatterson	Independent	Former Deputy Mayor (2023)
Central	Liz Foat	Independent	
Central	Geoff Wells	Independent	
Central	Scott Rossetti	Independent	Current and former Mayor (2010, 2013 and 2014); former Deputy Mayor (2009 and 2021)
Coastal	Cindy Madeley	Independent	Current Deputy Mayor
Coastal	Catherine Bannerman	Independent	
Coastal	Garry Stephens	Independent	Former Mayor (2021)

=== Administration and governance ===
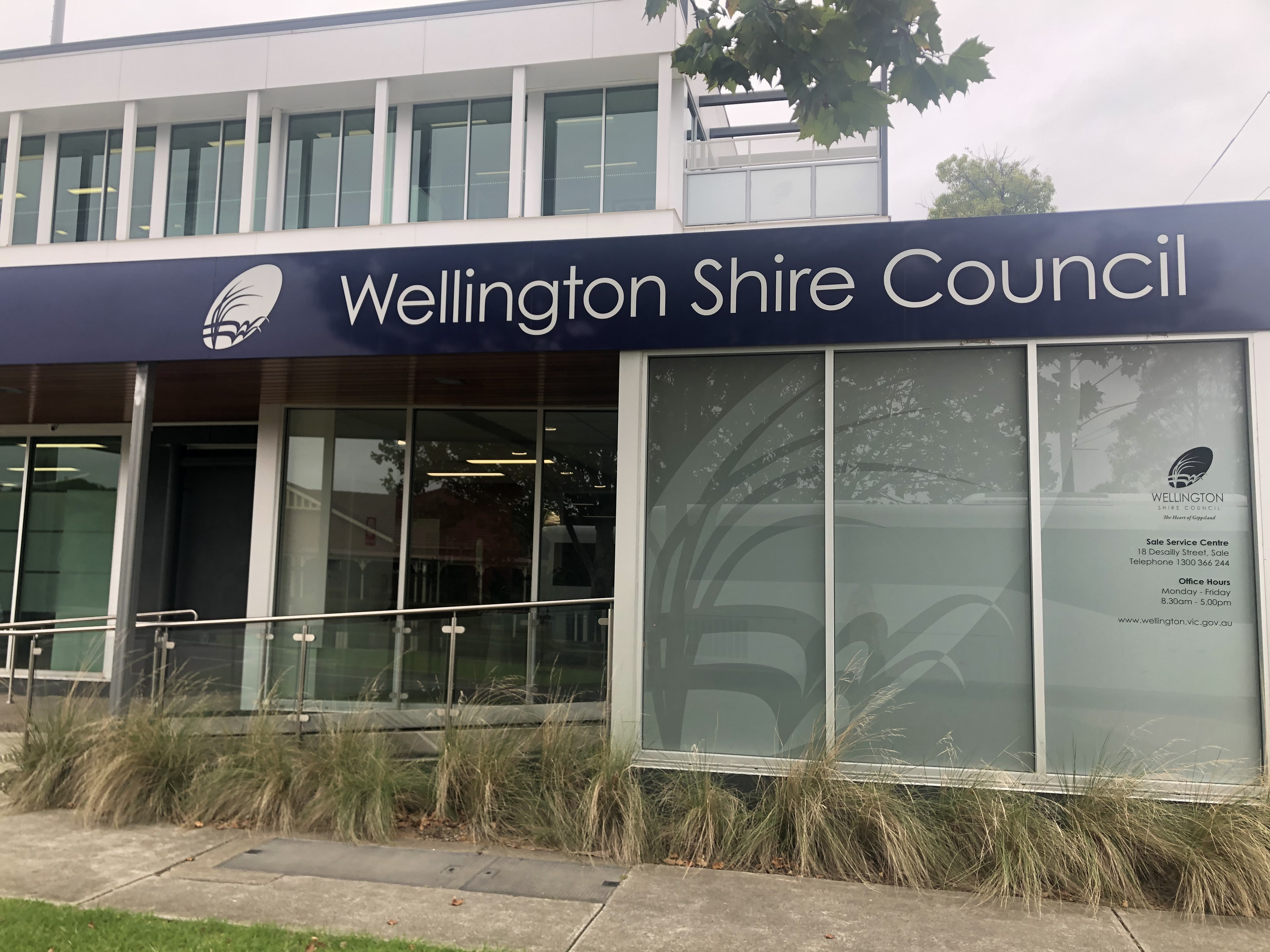
Wellington Shire service centre in Sale

The Council meets in the Council Chambers of the Wellington Centre in the Port of Sale precinct at 70 Foster Street, which also houses the Gippsland Art Gallery, Visitor Information Centre and Sale Library. The council headquarters are located over the road at 18 Desailly Street which is the location of the council's administrative activities. It also provides customer services at its service centres in Maffra, Stratford, Rosedale and Yarram.

== Townships and localities ==
In the 2021 census, the shire's population was 45,639, up from 42,983 in the 2016 census.

Population
Locality	2016	2021
Airly	146	160
Alberton	262	297
Alberton West	81	76
Arbuckle	0	0
Balook^	4	9
Billabong	0	0
Binginwarri^	130	134
Blackwarry	25	38
Boisdale	275	307
Briagolong	1,081	1,133
Budgee Budgee	0	0
Bundalaguah	188	229
Buragwonduc	0	0
Bushy Park	50	49
Callignee North	50	42
Callignee South	12	10
Calrossie	26	30
Carrajung	102	100
Carrajung Lower	112	129
Carrajung South	44	42
Clydebank	107	133
Cobains	232	245
Coongulla	183	229
Cowa	0	0
Cowwarr^	368	389
Crookayan	0	0
Crooked River	4	5
Dargo^	99	105
Darriman	12	12
Dawson	37	40
Denison	469	453
Devon North	344	352
Dutson	27	32
Dutson Downs	6	0
East Sale	93	210
Fernbank^	152	194
Flamingo Beach	0	0
Flynn^	180	188
Flynns Creek^	9	12
Fulham	951	994
Gelliondale	31	43
Giffard	52	73
Giffard West	71	72
Gillum	0	0
Glenfalloch	0	0
Glengarry^	1,084	1,113
Glenmaggie	277	279
Glomar Beach	10	21
Golden Beach	293	356
Gormandale	321	324
Grand Ridge^	12	10
Hawkhurst	3	6
Hedley^	125	108
Heyfield	1,993	2,050
Hiamdale	26	36
Hiawatha	17	18
Hollands Landing	15	28
Howitt Plains	0	0
Hunterston	26	20
Jack River	134	161
Kilmany	171	165
Koorool	0	0
Lake Wellington	0	0
Langsborough	118	100
Licola	11	7
Licola North	3	9
Llowalong	42	42
Loch Sport	814	1,021
Longford	1,497	1,489
Macks Creek	29	35
Madalya	20	21
Maffra	5,280	5,384
Maffra West Upper	82	73
Manns Beach	24	29
McLoughlins Beach	104	121
Meerlieu	76	90
Miowera	0	0
Monomak	0	0
Montgomery	65	65
Moornapa	7	5
Moroka	0	0
Munro	143	167
Myrtlebank	127	126
Nambrok	299	280
Nap Nap Marra	0	0
Newry	427	451
Ocean Grange^	0	5
Paradise Beach	160	172
Pearsondale	135	125
Perry Bridge	75	72
Port Albert	293	403
Reynard^	0	0
Riverslea	149	165
Robertsons Beach	55	49
Rosedale	1,654	1,729
Sale	13,673	14,296
Sargood	0	0
Seacombe	20	15
Seaspray	322	373
Seaton	157	161
Snake Island	0	0
Staceys Bridge	34	44
Stockdale	55	41
Stradbroke	172	187
Stratford	2,617	2,980
Tamboritha	0	0
Tarra Valley	77	85
Tarraville	80	69
The Heart	29	30
The Honeysuckles	82	131
Tinamba	277	358
Tinamba West	49	63
Toolome	0	0
Toongabbie^	989	1,085
Valencia Creek	152	187
Walhalla^	20	35
Walhalla East	0	0
Willung	69	77
Willung South	138	146
Winnindoo	75	127
Won Wron	222	196
Wongungarra^	0	0
Wonyip	32	39
Woodside	364	374
Woodside Beach	95	114
Woodside North	*	#
Woolenook	4	0
Worrowing	0	0
Wrathung	0	0
Wrixon	0	0
Wurruk	1,112	1,177
Yangoura	0	0
Yarram	2,135	2,136

^ - Territory divided with another LGA
* - Not noted in the 2016 census
# - Not noted in the 2021 census

== See also ==
- Central Gippsland
- East Gippsland
- List of localities (Victoria)
