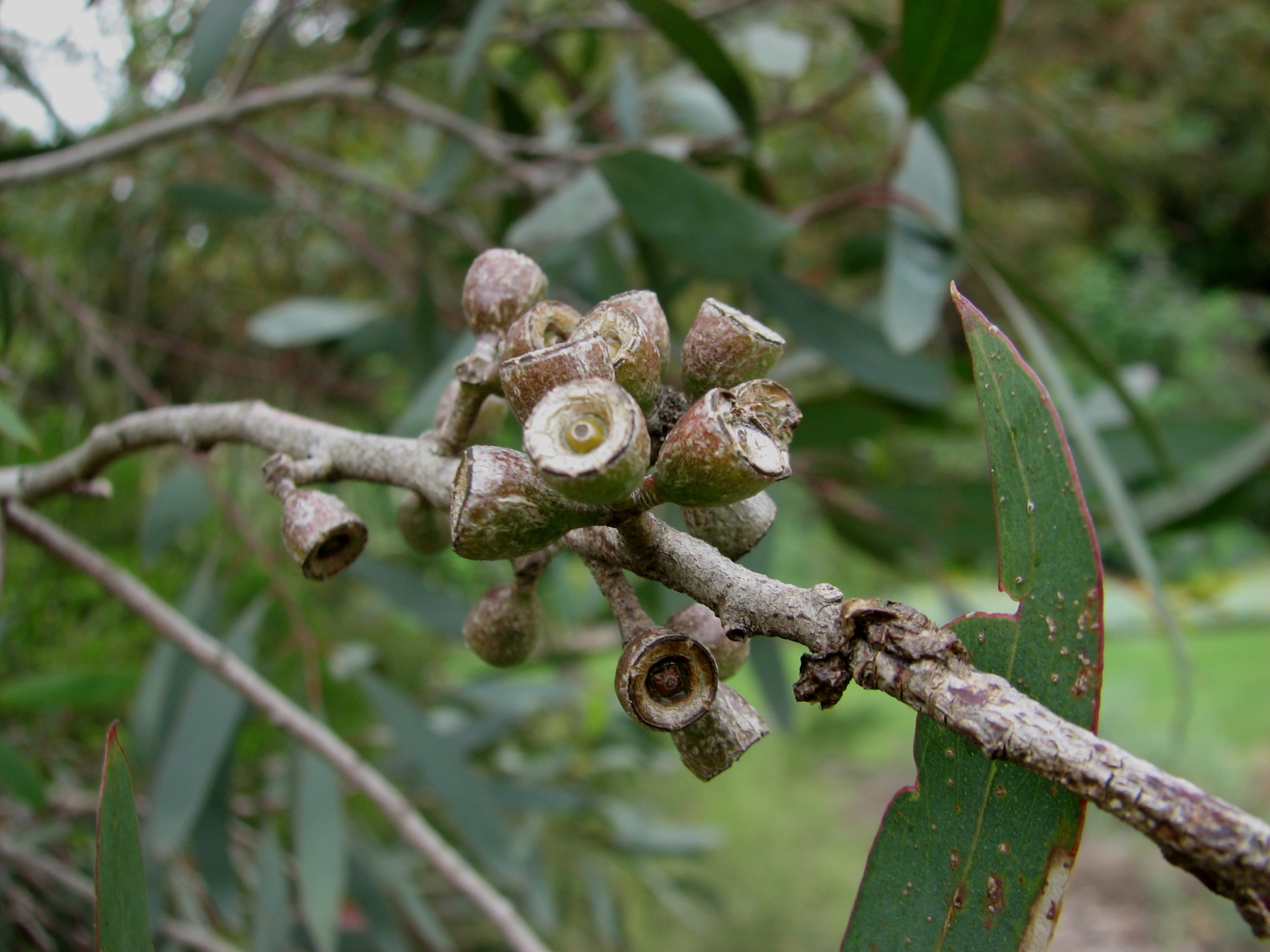
- Fruit of E. walshii in the Royal Botanic Gardens Victoria

Conservation status
- Critically Endangered (IUCN 3.1)

Scientific classification
- Kingdom: Plantae
- Clade: Tracheophytes
- Clade: Angiosperms
- Clade: Eudicots
- Clade: Rosids
- Order: Myrtales
- Family: Myrtaceae
- Genus: Eucalyptus
- Species: E. walshii

Binomial name
- Eucalyptus walshii Rule

Synonyms
- Eucalyptus aff. lansdowneana (Little Desert)

= Eucalyptus walshii =

Species of eucalyptus

Eucalyptus walshii is a small, slender, pole-like tree that is endemic to Victoria, Australia. It has smooth bark, lance-shaped to egg-shaped adult leaves, flower buds in groups of seven to eleven, white flowers and cup-shaped fruit.

== Description ==
Eucalyptus walshii is a tree that typically grows to a height of 4–9 m (13–30 ft) and forms a lignotuber. It has smooth whitish to grey bark, with a stocking of rough fibrous or flaky bark on the lowest 1 m (3 ft 3 in) or less of the trunk. Young plants and coppice regrowth have elliptical to narrow lance-shaped leaves that are about 100 m (330 ft) long and 23 mm (0.91 in) wide. Adult leaves are somewhat glossy, egg-shaped to lance-shaped, 70–100 mm (2.8–3.9 in) long and 14–26 mm (0.55–1.02 in) wide on a petiole 5–10 mm (0.20–0.39 in) long. The flower buds are arranged in leaf axils in groups of seven, nine or eleven on an unbranched peduncle 7–11 mm (0.28–0.43 in) long, the individual buds on pedicels 2–4 mm (0.079–0.157 in) long. Mature buds are oval to spindle-shaped, 5–7 mm (0.20–0.28 in) long and 3–4 mm (0.12–0.16 in) wide with a conical operculum 3–4 mm (0.12–0.16 in) long. Flowering occurs in autumn and the flowers are white. The fruit is a woody, cup-shaped capsule 5–6 mm (0.20–0.24 in) long and 4–5 mm (0.16–0.20 in) wide with the valves below rim level.

== Taxonomy and naming ==
Eucalyptus walshii was first formally described in 2004 by Kevin James Rule in the journal Muelleria from specimens collected near Broughton's Waterhole in the Little Desert National Park in 2002. The specific epithet honours botanist Neville Walsh of the National Herbarium of Victoria. Plants of the World Online considers E. walshii a synonym of Eucalyptus wimmerensis.

== Distribution and habitat ==
This eucalypt is only known from a single population growing in mallee woodland on a low hill near the type location.

== See also ==
- List of Eucalyptus species
