= Eucalyptus pauciflora subsp. acerina =

Snow gum

Scientific classification
- Kingdom: Plantae
- Clade: Embryophytes
- Clade: Tracheophytes
- Clade: Spermatophytes
- Clade: Angiosperms
- Clade: Eudicots
- Clade: Rosids
- Order: Myrtales
- Family: Myrtaceae
- Genus: Eucalyptus
- Species: E. pauciflora
- Subspecies: E. p. subsp. acerina

Trinomial name
- Eucalyptus pauciflora subsp. acerina Rule

Subspecies of eucalyptus

Eucalyptus pauciflora subsp. acerina, commonly known as snow gum, is a mallee or small tree that is endemic to a small area of Victoria, Australia. It has smooth, shiny bark, glossy green lance-shaped to egg-shaped leaves, flower buds in groups of between nine and fifteen, white flowers and hemispherical or conical fruit. It differs from other subspecies of E. pauciflora in having a dense crown and no parts that are glaucous.

== Description ==
Eucalyptus pauciflora subsp. acerina is a mallee or tree that typically grows to a height of 12 m (39 ft) and forms a lignotuber. It has smooth, shiny, white, cream-coloured, grey and green bark that is shed in ribbons. Young plants and coppice regrowth have dull bluish green, egg-shaped to elliptic leaves that are 30–80 mm (1.2–3.1 in) long and 20–50 mm (0.79–1.97 in) wide and petiolate. Adult leaves are egg-shaped to lance-shaped or elliptical, 55–125 mm (2.2–4.9 in) long and 10–30 mm (0.39–1.18 in) wide on a petiole 10–20 mm (0.39–0.79 in) long. The flower buds are arranged in leaf axils in groups of between nine and fifteen on an unbranched peduncle 2–7 mm (0.079–0.276 in) long, the individual buds on pedicels up to 2 mm (0.079 in) long. Mature buds are oval to pear-shaped, about 5 mm (0.20 in) long and 4 mm (0.16 in) wide with a rounded operculum. Flowering has been recorded in January and the flowers are white. The fruit is a woody hemispherical or conical capsule 5–6 mm (0.20–0.24 in) long and 5–10 mm (0.20–0.39 in) wide with the valves near rim level. Subspecies acerina differs from others in the species in having a dense crown and no glaucous parts.

== Taxonomy and naming ==
Eucalyptus pauciflora subsp. acerina was first formally described in 1994 by Kevin James Rule in the journal Muelleria, from material collected on Mount Erica in Baw Baw National Park. The epithet (acerina) is from Latin, referring to the absence of surface wax on adult plants.

== Distribution and habitat ==
This subspecies is only known from the Baw Baw plateau and the nearby Mount Useful.
