= Eucalyptus strzeleckii =

Strzelecki gum

Conservation status
- Endangered (IUCN 3.1)

- Vulnerable (EPBC Act)

Scientific classification
- Kingdom: Plantae
- Clade: Tracheophytes
- Clade: Angiosperms
- Clade: Eudicots
- Clade: Rosids
- Order: Myrtales
- Family: Myrtaceae
- Genus: Eucalyptus
- Species: E. strzeleckii

Binomial name
- Eucalyptus strzeleckii Rule

Species of eucalyptus

Eucalyptus strzeleckii, commonly known as Strzelecki gum or wax-tip, is a species of small to medium-sized tree that is endemic to a small area of Victoria, Australia. It has smooth bark, sometimes with a few slabs of fibrous bark near the base, lance-shaped to egg-shaped or curved adult leaves, flower buds in groups of seven, white flowers and conical fruit.

== Description ==
Eucalyptus strzeleckii is a tree that typically grows to a height of 30–40 m (98–131 ft) and forms a lignotuber. It has smooth, mottled cream-coloured, and pale brown bark, sometimes with a few slabs of rough, fibrous bark near the base. Young plants and coppice regrowth have egg-shaped leaves that are 40–80 mm (1.6–3.1 in) long and 15–47 mm (0.59–1.85 in) wide and petiolate. Adult leaves are the same shade of glossy green on both sides, lance-shaped to egg-shaped or curved, 75–215 mm (3.0–8.5 in) long and 14–33 mm (0.55–1.30 in) wide, tapering to a petiole 12–31 mm (0.47–1.22 in) long. The flower buds are arranged in leaf axils on an unbranched peduncle 5–14 mm (0.20–0.55 in) long, the individual buds on pedicels 3–5 mm (0.12–0.20 in) long. Mature buds are oval to diamond-shaped, 5–7 mm (0.20–0.28 in) long and 3–4 mm (0.12–0.16 in) wide with a beaked operculum. Flowering occurs in spring and the flowers are white. The fruit is a woody, conical capsule 3–5 mm (0.12–0.20 in) long and 5–7 mm (0.20–0.28 in) wide with the valves near rim level.

== Taxonomy and naming ==
Eucalyptus strzeleckii was first formally described in 1992 by Kevin James Rule in the journal Muelleria. The specific epithet (strzeleckii) honours Paul Strzelecki.

== Distribution ==
Strzelecki gum mostly grows in small, pure stands on ridges, slopes and along stream banks. It occurs in the western part of the Strzelecki Ranges, mainly between Foster, Neerim South and Moe.

== Conservation status ==
This eucalypt is classified as "vulnerable" under the Australian Government Environment Protection and Biodiversity Conservation Act 1999 and as "threatened" under the Victorian Government Flora and Fauna Guarantee Act 1988. The main threats to the species include grazing and trampling, weed invasion and habitat loss due to road works, firewood collection and agricultural activities. A recovery plan for the species has been prepared.

== See also ==
- List of Eucalyptus species
