= Eucalyptus pauciflora subsp. hedraia =

Snow gum

Scientific classification
- Kingdom: Plantae
- Clade: Embryophytes
- Clade: Tracheophytes
- Clade: Spermatophytes
- Clade: Angiosperms
- Clade: Eudicots
- Clade: Rosids
- Order: Myrtales
- Family: Myrtaceae
- Genus: Eucalyptus
- Species: E. pauciflora
- Subspecies: E. p. subsp. hedraia

Trinomial name
- Eucalyptus pauciflora subsp. hedraia Rule

Subspecies of eucalyptus

Eucalyptus pauciflora subsp. hedraia, commonly known as snow gum, is a mallee or small tree that is endemic to a small area of Victoria, Australia. It has smooth bark, branchlets that are often glaucous, glossy green lance-shaped to egg-shaped or elliptical adult leaves, flower buds in groups of between eleven and fifteen, white flowers and hemispherical or cup-shaped fruit. It differs from other subspecies of E. pauciflora in having larger, sessile, glaucous buds and broader, hemispherical fruit.

== Description ==
Eucalyptus pauciflora subsp. hedraia is a mallee or tree that typically grows to a height of 10 m (33 ft) and forms a lignotuber. It has smooth, white, grey, pale brown and green bark that usually has insect scribbles. Young plants and coppice regrowth have dull bluish green to glaucous, egg-shaped, oblong to round leaves that are 45–120 mm (1.8–4.7 in) long and 15–40 mm (0.59–1.57 in) wide and petiolate. Adult leaves are the same shade of glossy green on both sides, broadly lance-shaped to egg-shaped, elliptical or curved, 55–155 mm (2.2–6.1 in) long and 15–40 mm (0.59–1.57 in) wide on a petiole 10–32 mm (0.39–1.26 in) long. The flower buds are arranged in leaf axils in groups of between eleven and fifteen on an unbranched peduncle up to 7 mm (0.28 in) long, the individual buds usually sessile or rarely on pedicels up to 1 mm (0.039 in) long. Mature buds are oval to club-shaped, 6–10 mm (0.24–0.39 in) long and 5–6 mm (0.20–0.24 in) wide with a conical to rounded operculum. Flowering has been recorded in December and January and the flowers are white. The fruit is a woody, broadly hemispherical or cup-shaped capsule 8–12 mm (0.31–0.47 in) long and 10–15 mm (0.39–0.59 in) wide with the valves near rim level. Subspecies hedraia differs from others in the species in having glaucous flower buds and broader, hemispherical fruit.

== Taxonomy and naming ==
Eucalyptus pauciflora subsp. hedraia was first formally described in 1994 by Kevin James Rule in the journal Muelleria, from material collected in the Falls Creek Ski Village in 1982. The epithet (hedraia) is from ancient Greek, referring to the sessile buds and fruits.

== Distribution ==
This subspecies is only known from the Falls Creek Ski Village area.
