= Eucalyptus hawkeri =

Conservation status
- Vulnerable (IUCN 3.1)

Scientific classification
- Kingdom: Plantae
- Clade: Tracheophytes
- Clade: Angiosperms
- Clade: Eudicots
- Clade: Rosids
- Order: Myrtales
- Family: Myrtaceae
- Genus: Eucalyptus
- Species: E. hawkeri

Binomial name
- Eucalyptus hawkeri Rule

Species of eucalyptus

Eucalyptus hawkeri is a species of mallee or slender tree that is endemic to Victoria, Australia. It has rough, flaky or fibrous bark on the lower trunk, smooth bark above, lance-shaped or curved adult leaves, flower buds in groups of between seven and eleven, white flowers and cylindrical or barrel-shaped fruit.

== Description ==
Eucalyptus hawkerii is a mallee or slender tree that typically grows to a height of 15 m (49 ft). It has rough, scaly or fibrous bark on the lower half of its trunk, smooth light grey to brownish bark above. Young plants have lance-shaped to narrow elliptical leaves that are dull bluish green, slightly paler on the lower side, 60–120 mm (2.4–4.7 in) long and 6–12 mm (0.24–0.47 in) wide on a petiole 6–12 mm (0.24–0.47 in) long. Adult leaves are lance-shaped, sometimes curved, 70–120 mm (2.8–4.7 in) long and 8–17 mm (0.31–0.67 in) wide on a petiole 10–16 mm (0.39–0.63 in) long. The flower buds are arranged in leaf axils in groups of seven, nine or eleven on an unbranched peduncle 7–11 mm (0.28–0.43 in) long, the individual buds on pedicels 4–8 mm (0.16–0.31 in) long. Mature buds are oval to spindle-shaped, 6–7 mm (0.24–0.28 in) long and 3–4 mm (0.12–0.16 in) wide with a conical operculum about half as long as the floral cup. Flowering occurs in autumn and the flowers are white. The fruit is a woody, more or less cylindrical or barrel-shaped capsule 6–7 mm (0.24–0.28 in) long and 3–4 mm (0.12–0.16 in) wide with the valves below rim level.

== Taxonomy and naming ==
Eucalyptus hawkeri was first formally described in 2004 by Kevin Rule from a specimen collected on Mount Arapiles and the description was published in the journal Muelleria. The specific epithet honours the park ranger, Peter Hawker, for his contribution to the understanding of this species.

== Distribution and habitat ==
This mallee is only known from the Mt. Arapiles area and nearby reserves where it grows in remnant woodland.

The total population of the species is estimated at around 1,300 individuals spread over 10 main sub-populations. The population is thought to currently be stable although it is severely fragmented. The International Union for the Conservation of Nature listed it as a vulnerable species in 2019.

== See also ==
- List of Eucalyptus species
