= Eucalyptus bunyip =

Conservation status
- Least Concern (IUCN 3.1)

Scientific classification
- Kingdom: Plantae
- Clade: Tracheophytes
- Clade: Angiosperms
- Clade: Eudicots
- Clade: Rosids
- Order: Myrtales
- Family: Myrtaceae
- Genus: Eucalyptus
- Species: E. bunyip

Binomial name
- Eucalyptus bunyip Rule

Species of eucalyptus

Eucalyptus bunyip is a rare, slender tree that is endemic to a small area near Tonimbuk in Victoria. It has smooth, light coloured bark, glossy green egg-shaped to broadly lance-shaped adult leaves, club-shaped buds arranged in groups of seven, white flowers and bell-shaped fruit on a relatively long pedicel.

== Description ==
Eucalyptus bunyip is a slender tree typically growing to a height of about 40 m (100 ft) with smooth, whitish to light brown or yellowish bark with rough corky bark at the base of the trunk. The leaves on young plants are egg-shaped to lance-shaped, 40–60 mm (1.6–2.4 in) long and 16–30 mm (0.6–1 in) wide on a petiole 10–20 mm (0.39–0.79 in) long. Later, intermediate leaves are up to 80 mm (3.1 in) long and 55 mm (2 in) wide. Mature trees have large numbers of intermediate leaves in the crown. The adult leaves are broadly lance-shaped to egg-shaped, 100–170 mm (3.9–6.7 in) long and 18–32 mm (0.7–1 in) wide on a petiole 18–32 mm (0.71–1.3 in) long. They are more or less the same colour on both surfaces. The flower buds are arranged in groups of seven in leaf axils on a thin, delicate peduncle 9–14 mm (0.4–0.6 in) long, about 1 mm (0.04 in) in diameter, the individual buds on a pedicel about the same length as the buds. The mature buds are club-shaped to slightly diamond-shaped, 7–9 mm (0.28–0.35 in) long and 2.5–3.5 mm (0.1–0.1 in) wide with a slightly beaked operculum. Flowering occurs in autumn and the flowers are white. The fruit is a woody, more or less hemispherical capsule up to 6 mm (0.2 in) long and 5 mm (0.2 in) wide on a slender pedicel 6–10 mm (0.2–0.4 in) long.

== Taxonomy and naming ==
Eucalyptus bunyip was first formally described in 2012 by Kevin James Rule and the description was published in the journal Muelleria from a specimen collected in the Bunyip State Park. The specific epithet (bunyip) is a reference to the type location.

== Distribution and habitat ==
This eucalypt is a rare tree that grows in the valley floors on the Diamond and Black Snake Creeks in the Bunyip State Park.
