= Eucalyptus litoralis =

Anglesea box

Conservation status
- Vulnerable (IUCN 3.1)

Scientific classification
- Kingdom: Plantae
- Clade: Tracheophytes
- Clade: Angiosperms
- Clade: Eudicots
- Clade: Rosids
- Order: Myrtales
- Family: Myrtaceae
- Genus: Eucalyptus
- Species: E. litoralis

Binomial name
- Eucalyptus litoralis Rule

Species of eucalyptus

Eucalyptus litoralis, commonly known as Anglesea box, is a species of tree that is endemic to a small area of Victoria in southestern Australia. It has rough but thin, fibrous bark on the trunk, smooth pale grey bark on the branches, lance-shaped to curved adult leaves, flower buds in groups of seven, white flowers and cup-shaped or barrel-shaped fruit.

== Description ==
Eucalyptus litoralis is a tree that typically grows to a height of 10 m (33 ft) and forms a lignotuber. The bark on the trunk is rough but thin, fibrous and greyish and on the branches smooth and pale grey. Young plants and coppice regrowth have stems that are more or less square in cross-section and leaves that are arranged in opposite pairs, sessile, egg-shaped to almost round, 35–125 mm (1.4–4.9 in) long and 30–115 mm (1.2–4.5 in) wide. Adult leaves are lance-shaped to curved, the same glossy green on both sides, 120–210 mm (4.7–8.3 in) long and 20–33 mm (0.79–1.30 in) wide on a petiole 20–40 mm (0.79–1.57 in) long. The flower buds are arranged in leaf axils in groups of seven on an unbranched peduncle 10–24 mm (0.39–0.94 in) long, the individual buds sessile or on pedicels up to 4 mm (0.16 in) long. Mature buds are cylindrical to spindle-shaped, 10–14 mm (0.39–0.55 in) long and 4–6 mm (0.16–0.24 in) wide with a conical operculum. Flowering has been recorded in March and the flowers are white. The fruit is a woody, cup-shaped or barrel-shaped capsule 7–11 mm (0.28–0.43 in) long and wide with the valves near rim level.

== Taxonomy and naming ==
Eucalyptus litoralis was first formally described in 2004 by Kevin Rule from a specimen he collected near Anglesea in 2000. The description was published in the journal Muelleria. The specific epithet (litoralis) is a Latin word meaning "pertaining to the "sea-shore", referring to the distribution of this species.

== Distribution and habitat ==
Anglesea box grows in poor soils on sandstone ridges where it is often exposed to ocean wind. It is found in coastal areas from near Anglesea to Aireys Inlet with an outlier near Lorne.

== See also ==
- List of Eucalyptus species
