= Eucalyptus conferta =

Conservation status
- Vulnerable (IUCN 3.1)

Scientific classification
- Kingdom: Plantae
- Clade: Tracheophytes
- Clade: Angiosperms
- Clade: Eudicots
- Clade: Rosids
- Order: Myrtales
- Family: Myrtaceae
- Genus: Eucalyptus
- Species: E. conferta

Binomial name
- Eucalyptus conferta Rule

Species of eucalyptus

Eucalyptus conferta is a rare, slender tree that is endemic to a small area near Chewton, Victoria in Australia. It has thick, rough, fissured bark, dull green to bluish, lance-shaped adult leaves, flower buds arranged in groups of seven, white flowers and hemispherical fruit.

== Description ==
Eucalyptus conferta is a slender tree typically growing to a height of about 15 m (50 ft) with thick, rough, fissured bark. The leaves on young plants are linear, curved, dull and glaucous, up to 80 mm (3.1 in) long and 9 mm (0.35 in) wide on a short petiole, or sessile. Adult leaves are dull green to bluish, lance-shaped, 70–110 mm (2.8–4.3 in) long and 12–18 mm (0.47–0.71 in) wide on a petiole 12–18 mm (0.47–0.71 in) long. The flower buds are arranged in groups of seven in leaf axils on a thin peduncle 7–11 mm (0.28–0.43 in) long, the individual buds on a thin pedicel 2–5. The mature buds are oval, 6–7 mm (0.24–0.28 in) long and 2–3 mm (0.079–0.118 in) wide with a conical operculum 3–4 mm (0.12–0.16 in) long. Flowering occurs in autumn and the flowers are white. The fruit is a woody, hemispherical to almost conical capsule 3–4 mm (0.12–0.16 in) long and wide on a slender pedicel 1–3 mm (0.04–0.1 in) long.

== Taxonomy and naming ==
Eucalyptus conferta was first formally described in 2012 by Kevin James Rule and the description was published in the journal Muelleria from a specimen collected in the Fryers Range west of Malmsbury. The specific epithet (conferta) is a Latin word meaning "pressed together", "crowded", "thick" or "dense", referring to the crowded leaves on immature plants.

== Distribution and habitat ==
This eucalypt is a rare tree, restricted to the Glenluce State Forest about 17 km (11 mi) south of Chewton in Victoria, where it grows on hilly sites in dry, shallow soils.
