= Eucalyptus forresterae =

Brumby sallee

Conservation status
- Data Deficient (IUCN 3.1)

Scientific classification
- Kingdom: Plantae
- Clade: Tracheophytes
- Clade: Angiosperms
- Clade: Eudicots
- Clade: Rosids
- Order: Myrtales
- Family: Myrtaceae
- Genus: Eucalyptus
- Species: E. forresterae

Binomial name
- Eucalyptus forresterae Rule & Molyneux

Species of eucalyptus

Eucalyptus forresterae, commonly known as brumby sallee, is a species of "whipstick" mallee that is endemic to a restricted area in Victoria. It has smooth greenish to whitish bark, glossy green, lance-shaped to narrow egg-shaped adult leaves, flower buds in groups of between eleven and twenty one, white flowers and conical or shortened hemispherical fruit.

== Description ==
Eucalyptus forresterae is a shrubby, whipstick mallee that typically grows to a height of 2–5 m (6 ft 7 in – 16 ft 5 in) and has smooth light grey to whitish bark that is shed in strips or sheets. Young plants and coppice regrowth have crowded leaves arranged in opposite pairs, egg-shaped to heart-shaped or round, a lighter shade of green on the lower side, 20–40 mm (0.79–1.57 in) long and wide. Adult leaves are arranged alternately, the same glossy green on both sides, lance-shaped to narrow egg-shaped, 40–60 mm (1.6–2.4 in) long and 12–20 mm (0.47–0.79 in) wide on a petiole 2–6 mm (0.079–0.236 in) long. The flower buds are arranged in leaf axils in groups of between eleven and twenty one on an unbranched peduncle 1–3 mm (0.039–0.118 in) long, the individual buds sessile. Mature buds are spindle-shaped, 4–6 mm (0.16–0.24 in) long and about 2 mm (0.079 in) wide with a horn-shaped operculum about the same length as the floral cup. Flowering occurs in summer and the flowers are white. The fruit is a sessile, woody, cup-shaped to shortened hemispherical capsule about 4 mm (0.16 in) long and wide with the valves below the rim of the fruit.

== Taxonomy and naming ==
Eucalyptus forresterae was first formally described in 2011 by Kevin Rule and William Molyneux in the journal Muelleria but the description was not valid because no holotype was designated. A subsequent edition of the same journal corrected the typification. The specific epithet (forresterae) honours Sue Forrester who collected the type specimens with Molyneux.

Plants of the World Online considers E. forresterae a synonym of Eucalyptus stellulata.

== Distribution ==
Brumby sallee is only known from a few rocky sites at elevations above 1,200 m (3,900 ft) in the Cobberas Range.

== Conservation status ==
This species is listed as "endangered" on the Victorian Government's Department of Sustainability and Environment's Advisory List of Rare Or Threatened Plants In Victoria.

== See also ==
- List of Eucalyptus species
