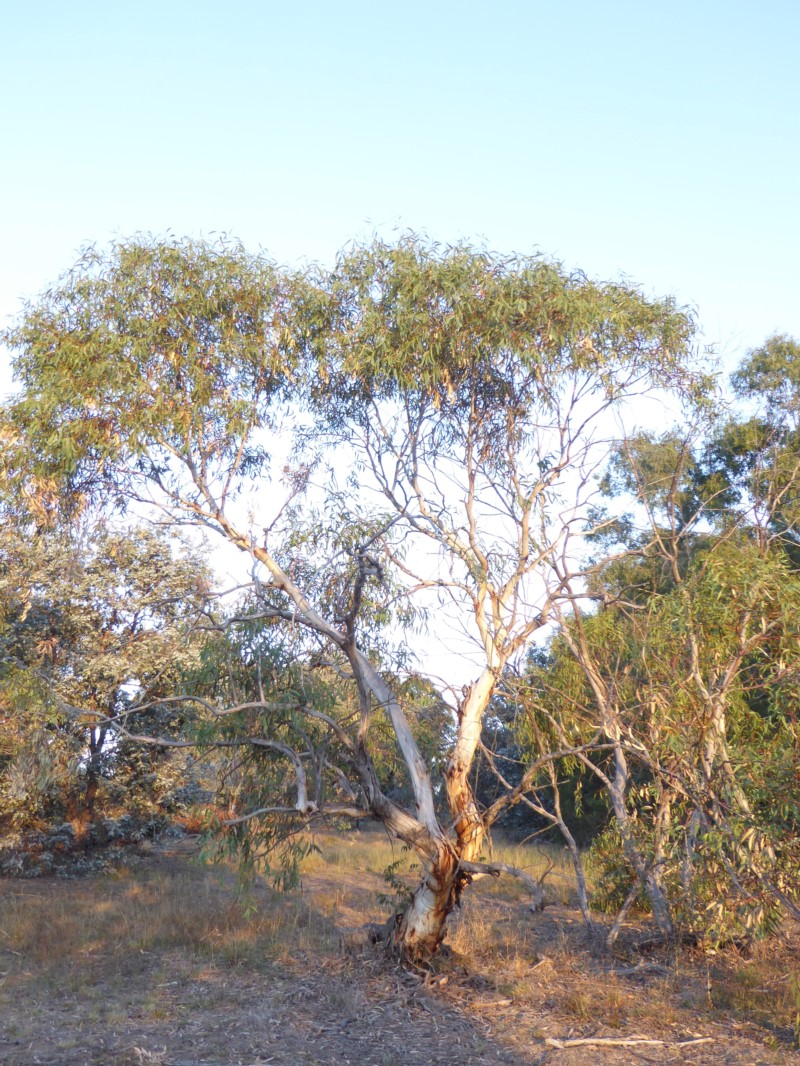
- Subspecies pauciflora in Deakin

Scientific classification
- Kingdom: Plantae
- Clade: Embryophytes
- Clade: Tracheophytes
- Clade: Spermatophytes
- Clade: Angiosperms
- Clade: Eudicots
- Clade: Rosids
- Order: Myrtales
- Family: Myrtaceae
- Genus: Eucalyptus
- Species: E. pauciflora Sieber ex Spreng.
- Subspecies: E. p. subsp. pauciflora

Trinomial name
- Eucalyptus pauciflora subsp. pauciflora

= Eucalyptus pauciflora subsp. pauciflora =

Snow gum

Species of eucalyptus

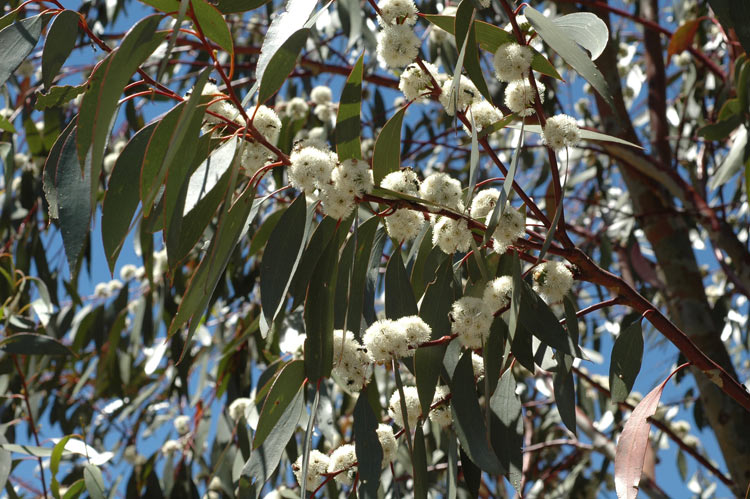
Flowers

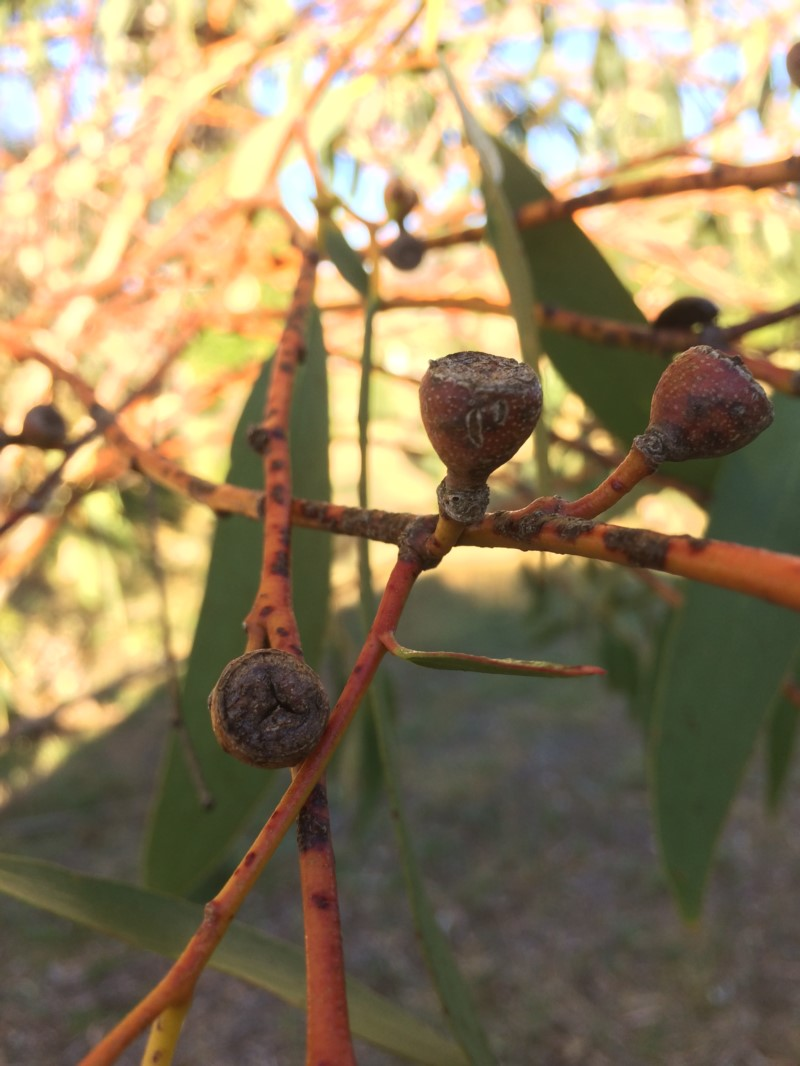
Fruit

Eucalyptus pauciflora subsp. pauciflora, commonly known as snow gum, cabbage gum or white sally is a tree or mallee that is endemic to eastern Australia. It has smooth bark, glossy green, lance-shaped, curved or elliptical leaves, flower buds in groups of between nine and fifteen, white flowers and cup-shaped, hemispherical or conical fruit.

== Description ==
Eucalyptus pauciflora subsp. pauciflora is a tree or mallee that typically grows to a height of 30 m (98 ft) and forms a lignotuber. The bark is smooth, grey, white or cream-coloured with patches of yellow and usually has insect scribbles. Young plants and coppice regrowth have dull bluish green or glaucous, broadly lance-shaped or egg-shaped leaves that are 44–170 mm (1.7–6.7 in) long, 20–85 mm (0.79–3.35 in) wide and petiolate. Adult leaves are lance-shaped, curved or elliptical, 60–200 mm (2.4–7.9 in) long and 12–50 mm (0.47–1.97 in) wide, on a petiole 8–33 mm (0.31–1.30 in) long. The flower buds are arranged in leaf axils in groups of between nine and fifteen on an unbranched peduncle 4–8 mm (0.16–0.31 in) long, the individual buds on pedicels up to 6 mm (0.24 in) long. Mature buds are oval, 4–8 mm (0.16–0.31 in) long and 3–5 mm (0.12–0.20 in) wide with a conical to rounded operculum. Flowering occurs between August and April and the flowers are white. The fruit is a woody cup-shaped, hemispherical or conical capsule 5–11 mm (0.20–0.43 in) long and wide with the valves near rim level or below it.

== Taxonomy and naming ==
Eucalyptus pauciflora was first formally described in 1827 by Kurt Polycarp Joachim Sprengel from an unpublished description by Franz Sieber and Sprengel's description was published in Systema Vegetabilium. When Lawrie Johnson and Donald Blaxell published subspecies debeuzevillei and niphophila, subspecies pauciflora became the autonym.

== Distribution and habitat ==
Subspecies pauciflora is the most widespread subspecies of Eucalyptus pauciflora and is found from near Stanthorpe in the far south east of Queensland, through New South Wales, Victoria and Tasmania to Mount Gambier in the south east of South Australia. It also occurs from coastal areas such as the Mornington Peninsula to all but the highest altitudes in the Australian Alps. It grows in woodland and forest, often in pure stands, but often also with other eucalypt species.
