= Eucalyptus yarriambiack =

Conservation status
- Critically Endangered (IUCN 3.1)

Scientific classification
- Kingdom: Plantae
- Clade: Tracheophytes
- Clade: Angiosperms
- Clade: Eudicots
- Clade: Rosids
- Order: Myrtales
- Family: Myrtaceae
- Genus: Eucalyptus
- Species: E. yarriambiack

Binomial name
- Eucalyptus yarriambiack Rule

Species of eucalyptus

Eucalyptus yarriambiack is a species of small, spreading tree that is only known from a single population in Victoria, Australia. It has rough, fibrous to flaky bark on the trunk, smooth bark above, narrow lance-shaped to elliptical adult leaves, flower buds in groups of seven to eleven, white flowers and hemispherical to cup-shaped fruit.

== Description ==
Eucalyptus yarriambiack is a robust, spreading tree that typically grows to a height and spread of 10 m (33 ft) and often has a few thick trunks. It has rough, greyish brown, fibrous to flaky bark on the trunks, smooth, light grey or brownish bark above. Young plants have narrow elliptical to narrow lance-shaped leaves that are about 90 mm (3.5 in) long and 11 mm (0.43 in) wide. Adult leaves are olive green to bluish green and leathery, narrow lance-shaped to lance-shaped or curved, 50–100 mm (2.0–3.9 in) long and 8–15 mm (0.31–0.59 in) wide on a petiole 9–14 mm (0.35–0.55 in) long. The flower buds are arranged in leaf axils in groups of seven to eleven on a peduncle 6–11 mm (0.24–0.43 in) long, the individual buds on pedicels 2–4 mm (0.079–0.157 in) long. Mature buds are oval to slightly club-shaped, 4–6 mm (0.16–0.24 in) long and about 3 mm (0.12 in) wide with a conical operculum that is shorter than the floral cup. Flowering occurs in autumn and the flowers are white. The fruit is a woody hemispherical to cup-shaped capsule 4–6 mm (0.16–0.24 in) long and 3–4 mm (0.12–0.16 in) wide with the valves below rim level.

== Taxonomy and naming ==
Eucalyptus yarriambiack was first formally described in 2012 by Kevin James Rule in the journal Muelleria from specimens he collected in 2005 near Brim. The specific epithet (yarriambiack) refers to Yarriambiack Creek near where the species occurs and is in turn of Aboriginal origin.

== Distribution and habitat ==
This eucalypt is only known from a single site between Brim and Beulah in a usually dry watercourse.

== See also ==
- List of Eucalyptus species
