= Eucalyptus pauciflora subsp. parvifructa =

Snow gum

Scientific classification
- Kingdom: Plantae
- Clade: Embryophytes
- Clade: Tracheophytes
- Clade: Spermatophytes
- Clade: Angiosperms
- Clade: Eudicots
- Clade: Rosids
- Order: Myrtales
- Family: Myrtaceae
- Genus: Eucalyptus
- Species: E. pauciflora
- Subspecies: E. p. subsp. parvifructa

Trinomial name
- Eucalyptus pauciflora subsp. parvifructa Rule

Subspecies of eucalyptus

Eucalyptus pauciflora subsp. parvifructa is a mallee or small tree that is endemic to a small area of Victoria, Australia. It has smooth bark, slightly glaucous branchlets, glossy green, lance-shaped adult leaves, flower buds usually in groups of seven, white flowers and hemispherical or cup-shaped fruit. It differs from other subspecies of E. pauciflora in having a smaller habit and smaller leaves, flower buds and fruit.

== Description ==
Eucalyptus pauciflora subsp. parvifructa is a mallee or tree that typically grows to a height of 10 m (33 ft) and forms a lignotuber. It has smooth, whitish bark. Young plants and coppice regrowth have dull greyish green, lance-shaped to broadly lance-shaped leaves that are up to 110 mm (4.3 in) long and 30 mm (1.2 in) wide with waxy petioles up to 10 mm (0.39 in) long. Adult leaves are lustrous green, lance-shaped to egg-shaped, up to 100 mm (3.9 in) long and 20 mm (0.79 in) wide on a petiole up to 15 mm (0.59 in) long. The flower buds are arranged in leaf axils in groups of seven, rarely nine on a thin, flattened, unbranched peduncle up to 8 mm (0.31 in) long. Mature buds are club-shaped, about 9 mm (0.35 in) long and 3.5 mm (0.14 in) wide with a conical or hemispherical operculum. The flowers are white and the fruit is a woody, hemispherical, conical or cup-shaped capsule 5–8 mm (0.20–0.31 in) long and 6–8 mm (0.24–0.31 in) wide with the valves near rim level. Subspecies parvifructa differs from others in the species in having a smaller habit and smaller leaves, flower buds and fruit.

== Taxonomy and naming ==
Eucalyptus pauciflora subsp. parvifructa was first formally described in 1994 by Kevin James Rule in the journal Muelleria, from material collected near the summit of Mount William in 1970. The epithet (parvifructa) is from Latin, referring to the small size of the fruit.

== Distribution ==
This subspecies is only known from the Mount William Range in the Grampians National Park at altitudes of between 900 and 1,100 m (3,000 and 3,600 ft).
