= Eucalyptus ornans =

Avon peppermint

Conservation status
- Critically Endangered (IUCN 3.1)

Scientific classification
- Kingdom: Plantae
- Clade: Tracheophytes
- Clade: Angiosperms
- Clade: Eudicots
- Clade: Rosids
- Order: Myrtales
- Family: Myrtaceae
- Genus: Eucalyptus
- Species: E. ornans

Binomial name
- Eucalyptus ornans Rule & Molyneux

Species of eucalyptus

Eucalyptus ornans, commonly known as Avon peppermint, is a species of mallee that is endemic to a restricted area in Victoria. It has smooth whitish to grey bark, slightly glossy, bluish green, lance-shaped adult leaves, flower buds in groups of between seventeen and twenty one, white flowers and shortened hemispherical fruit.

== Description ==
Eucalyptus ornans is a mallee that typically grows to a height of 4–10 m (13–33 ft) and has smooth whitish to light grey bark that is shed in strips and ribbons. Young plants and coppice regrowth have sessile leaves arranged in opposite pairs, narrow lance-shaped, bluish green on the upper surface and whitish below, 50–80 mm (2.0–3.1 in) long and 7–12 mm (0.28–0.47 in) wide. The crown of the plant often contains intermediate leaves as well as adult leaves. Adult leaves are arranged alternately, the same slightly glossy green on both sides, narrow lance-shaped, 60–110 mm (2.4–4.3 in) long and 8–12 mm (0.31–0.47 in) wide on a petiole 6–12 mm (0.24–0.47 in) long. The flower buds are arranged in leaf axils in groups of between seventeen and twenty one on an unbranched peduncle 5–12 mm (0.20–0.47 in) long, the individual buds on thin pedicels 6–10 mm (0.24–0.39 in) long. Mature buds are spindle-shaped, about 4 mm (0.16 in) long and 2–3 mm (0.079–0.118 in) wide with a conical operculum about 2 mm (0.079 in) long and wide. Flowering occurs in summer and the flowers are white. The fruit is a sessile, woody, shortened hemispherical capsule about 4 mm (0.16 in) long and wide with the valves below the rim of the fruit.

== Taxonomy and naming ==
Eucalyptus ornans was first formally described in 2011 by Kevin Rule and William Molyneux in the journal Muelleria but the description was not valid because no holotype was designated. A subsequent edition of the same journal corrected the typification. The specific epithet (ornans) is from the Latin word "ornatus", referring to the ornamental habit of this eucalypt.

== Distribution ==
Avon peppermint is only known from a single population growing in coarse gravel near the Avon River, near Maffra.

== Conservation status ==
The Avon Peppermint was listed as "endangered" by the State Government of Victoria in 2014, in 2021 the classification was revised to "critically endangered" due to a "very restricted" range and only a single known wild population. The International Union for Conservation of Nature Red List classifies the species as "critically endangered" noting that only ten mature individuals remain. The main threats to the species are climate change and severe weather events.

== See also ==
- List of Eucalyptus species
