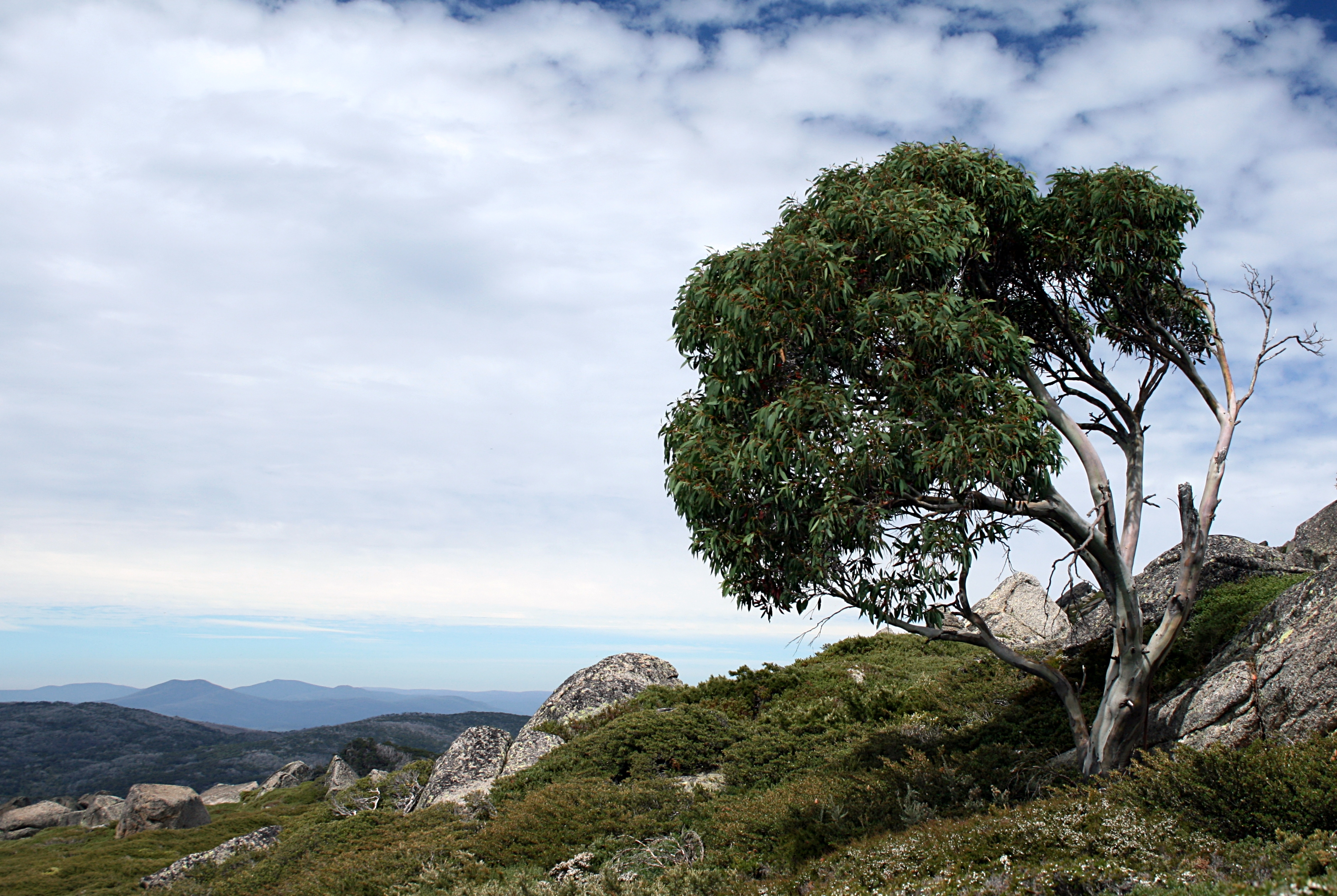
- Eucalyptus pauciflora near Thredbo

Conservation status
- Near Threatened (IUCN 3.1)

Scientific classification
- Kingdom: Plantae
- Clade: Tracheophytes
- Clade: Angiosperms
- Clade: Eudicots
- Clade: Rosids
- Order: Myrtales
- Family: Myrtaceae
- Genus: Eucalyptus
- Species: E. pauciflora

Binomial name
- Eucalyptus pauciflora Sieber ex Spreng.

Synonyms
- Synonyms: Eucalyptus coriacea Schauer; Eucalyptus coriacea Schauer var. coriacea; Eucalyptus phlebophylla F.Muell. nom. inval., nom. nud.; Eucalyptus phlebophylla F.Muell. ex Miq.; Eucalyptus submultiplinervis Miq.; Eucalyptus sylvicultrix F.Muell. ex Benth. nom. inval., pro syn.

= Eucalyptus pauciflora =

Snow gum

Species of eucalyptus

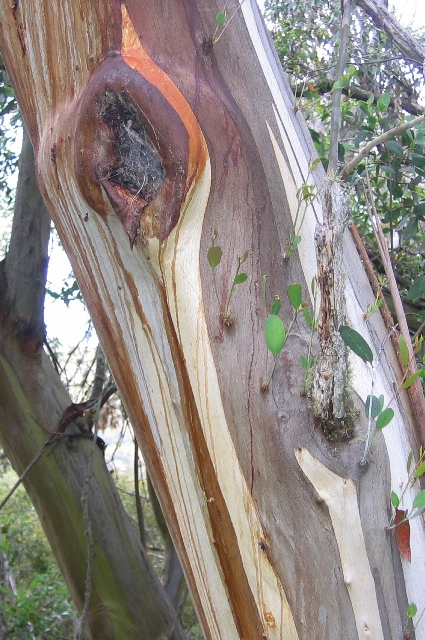
Trunk in Kosciuszko National Park

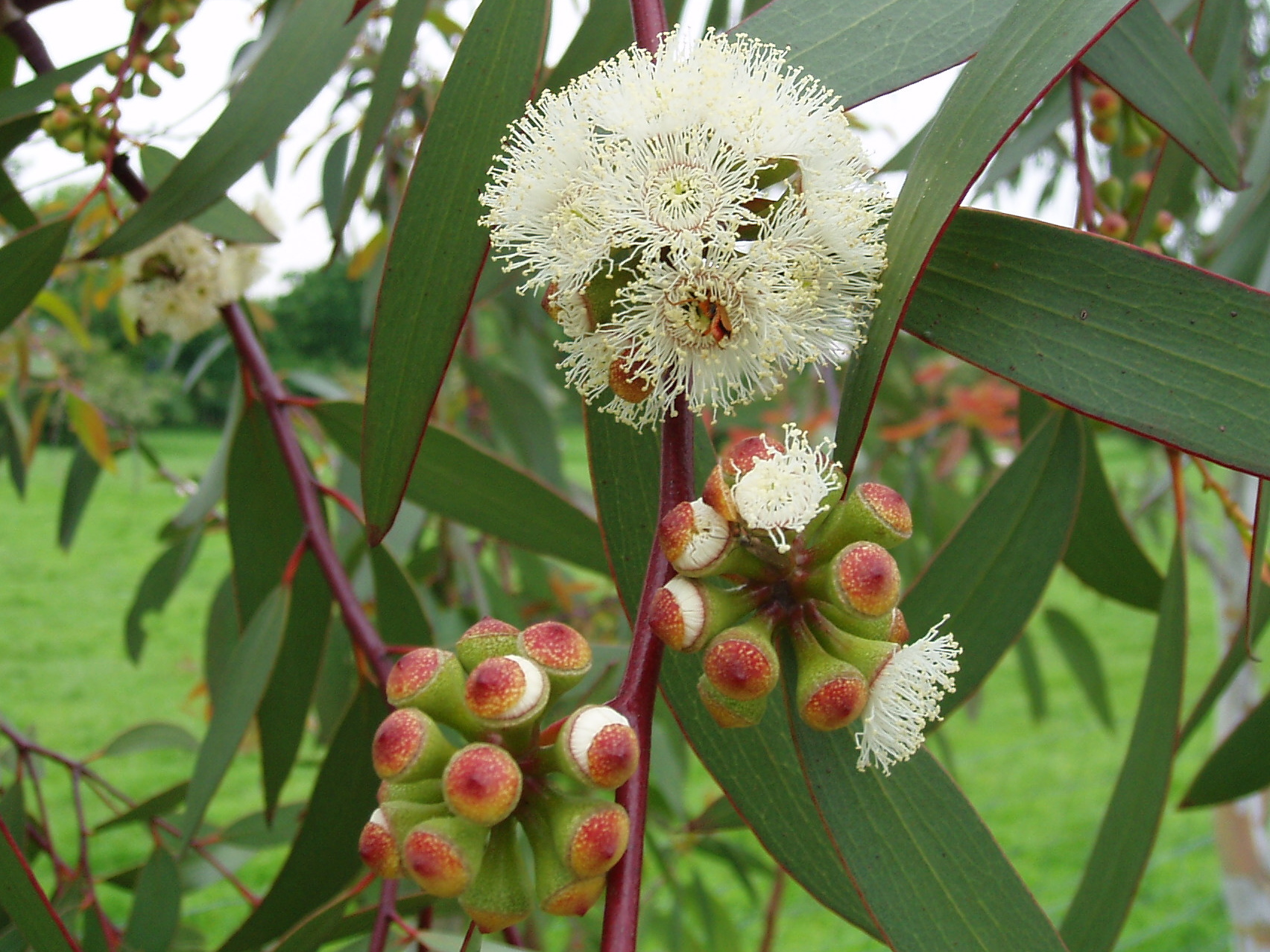
Flower buds and flowers

Eucalyptus pauciflora, commonly known as snow gum, cabbage gum or white sally, is a species of tree or mallee that is native to eastern Australia. It has smooth bark, lance-shaped to elliptical leaves, flower buds in clusters of between seven and fifteen, white flowers and cup-shaped, conical or hemispherical fruit. It is widespread and locally common in woodland in cold sites above 700 m (2,300 ft) altitude. It is notable for its exceptional cold tolerance and its ecological importance in alpine environments. The species is listed as Near Threatened on the IUCN Red list due to pressures including climate change and bush fires.

== Description ==
Eucalyptus pauciflora is a tree or mallee, that typically grows to a height of 20–30 m (66–98 ft) and forms a lignotuber. It has smooth white, grey or yellow bark that is shed in ribbons and sometimes has insect scribbles. Young plants and coppice regrowth have dull, bluish green or glaucous, broadly lance-shaped to egg-shaped leaves that are 44–170 mm (1.7–6.7 in) long and 20–85 mm (0.79–3.35 in) wide. Adult leaves are the same shade of glossy green on both sides, lance-shaped to curved or elliptical, 60–200 mm (2.4–7.9 in) long and 12–50 mm (0.47–1.97 in) wide, tapering to a petiole 8–33 mm (0.31–1.30 in) long. The flower buds are arranged in leaf axils in cluster of between seven and fifteen, sometimes more, on an unbranched peduncle 3–15 mm (0.12–0.59 in) long, the individual buds on pedicels up to 6 mm (0.24 in) long. Mature buds are oval, 4–8 mm (0.16–0.31 in) long and 3–5 mm (0.12–0.20 in) wide with a conical to rounded operculum. Flowering occurs from October to February and the flowers are white. The fruit is a woody, cup-shaped, conical or hemispherical capsule 5–11 mm (0.20–0.43 in) long and wide.

== Taxonomy ==
Eucalyptus pauciflora was first formally described in 1827 by Kurt Polycarp Joachim Sprengel from an unpublished description by Franz Sieber. Sprengel published the description in Systema Vegetabilium. The specific epithet pauciflora is from the Latin pauciflorus meaning "few-flowered". The term pauciflora (few-flowered) is a misnomer, and may originate in an early collected specimen losing its buds in transit.

Six subspecies are recognised by the Australian Plant Census as at 30 November 2019:

- Eucalyptus pauciflora subsp. acerina Rule occurs in Victoria;
- Eucalyptus pauciflora subsp. debeuzevillei (Maiden) L.A.S.Johnson & Blaxell in Victoria, New South Wales and the Australian Capital Territory;
- Eucalyptus pauciflora subsp. hedraia Rule in Victoria;
- Eucalyptus pauciflora subsp. niphophila (Maiden & Blakely) L.A.S.Johnson & Blaxell in New South Wales, the Australian Capital Territory and Victoria;
- Eucalyptus pauciflora subsp. parvifructa Rule in Victoria;
- Eucalyptus pauciflora Sieber ex Spreng. subsp. pauciflora is found in Queensland, New South Wales, the Australian Capital Territory, Victoria, South Australia and Tasmania.

== Distribution and habitat ==
Snow gum grows in woodland along the ranges and tablelands, in flat, cold sites above 700 m (2,300 ft) from the far south-east of Queensland, through New South Wales, the Australian Capital Territory, and Victoria, to near Mount Gambier in South Australia and Tasmania. The species shows regional and ecological variation across this range.

In Tasmania the species hybridises with Eucalyptus coccifera and Eucalyptus amygdalina.

Some genetic studies can be found else where since the Tasmanian populations of Eucalyptus pauciflora found that chloroplast haplotypes are geographically structured and indicate three major glacial refugial regions: Storm Bay, Tamar Valley, and the St Paul's River Valley.

== Conservation ==
The IUCN assessment notes that although the species remains widespread, localized declines are occurring due to habitat modification and climate-related stress in parts of its range.

== Ecology ==
Snow gum is amongst the hardiest of all eucalyptus species, surviving the severe winter temperatures of the Australian Alps. The species regenerates from seed, by epicormic shoots below the bark, and from lignotubers. It is the most cold-tolerant species of eucalyptus, with E. pauciflora subsp. niphophila surviving temperatures down to −23 °C (−9 °F) and year-round frosts. It has been introduced to Norway.

== Influence on snowpack processes ==
At altitudes where stands of snow gum coincide with seasonal snowfall above an altitude of about 1,500 m (4,900 ft), the trees have been shown to increase snowpack accumulation and moderate melt, making snow gum critically important to the hydrology and water resources of southeast Australia. Contrary to characteristics of needle-leaf forests, snow gums don't frequently intercept large quantities of snowfall on branches and leaves such that increased evaporation or sublimation would occur. As a result, snow accumulation is greater in living snow gum forests than burned forests or unforested areas.

Bushfire impact on snow gums alters these effects and leads to reduced snowpack longevity and greater evaporation/sublimation processes, in turn reducing snowpack runoff available for ecosystem and human use. It is estimated that the 2019-2020 bushfires impacted 462 km^{2} (33%) of mapped snow gum forest that regularly has seasonal snowpack, which would equate to a reduction in annual snowpack runoff of 63.3 gigalitres (about 25,320 olympic swimming pools). The rarity of long-unburnt snow gum stands suggest fire regimes have been substantially altered in parts of the Victorian alps.

== Use in horticulture ==
In cultivation in the UK, Eucalyptus pauciflora subsp. niphophila and Eucalyptus pauciflora subsp. debeuzevillei have gained the Royal Horticultural Society's Award of Garden Merit.

== Gallery ==
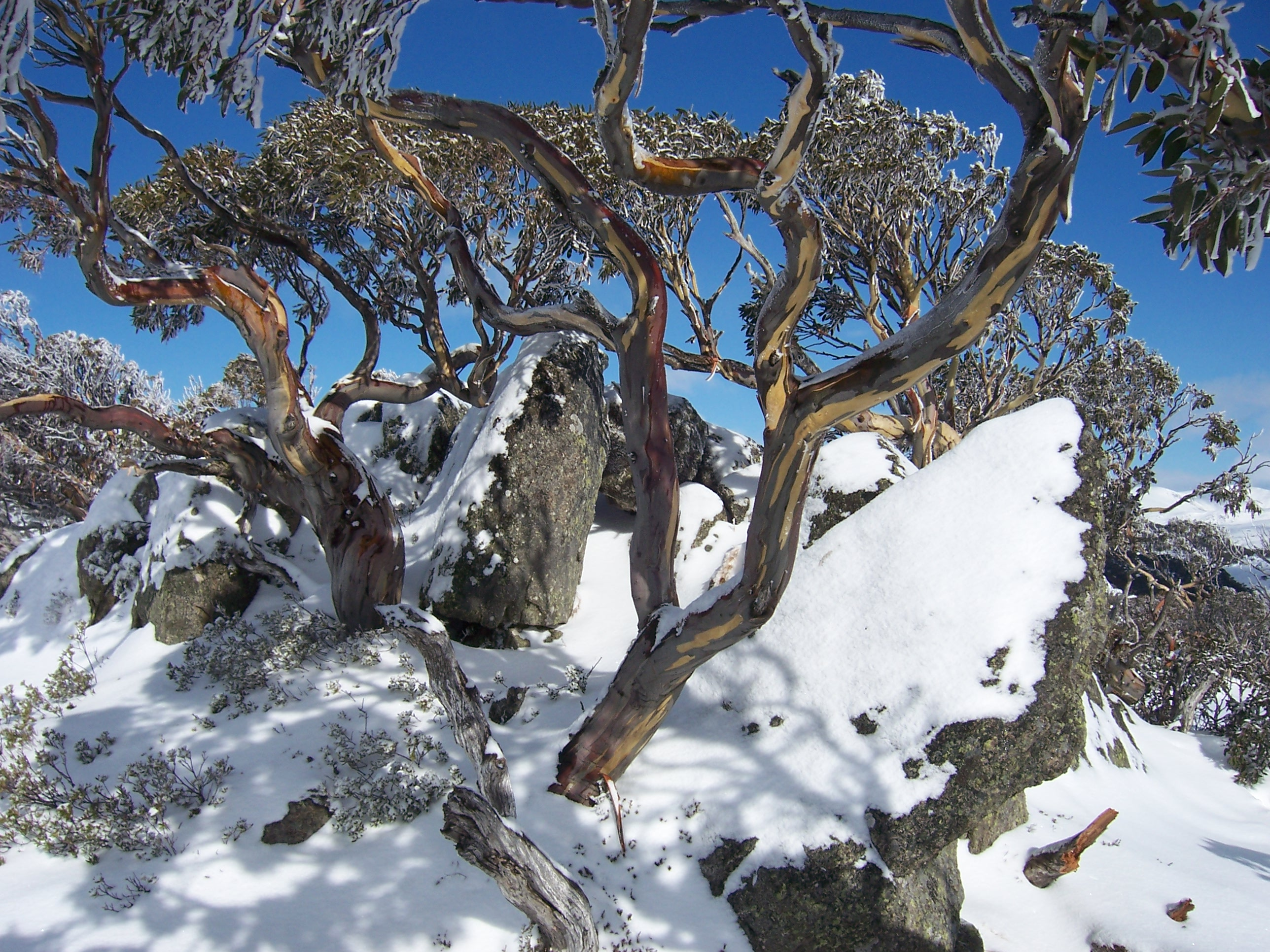
A snowgum at Perisher in New South Wales

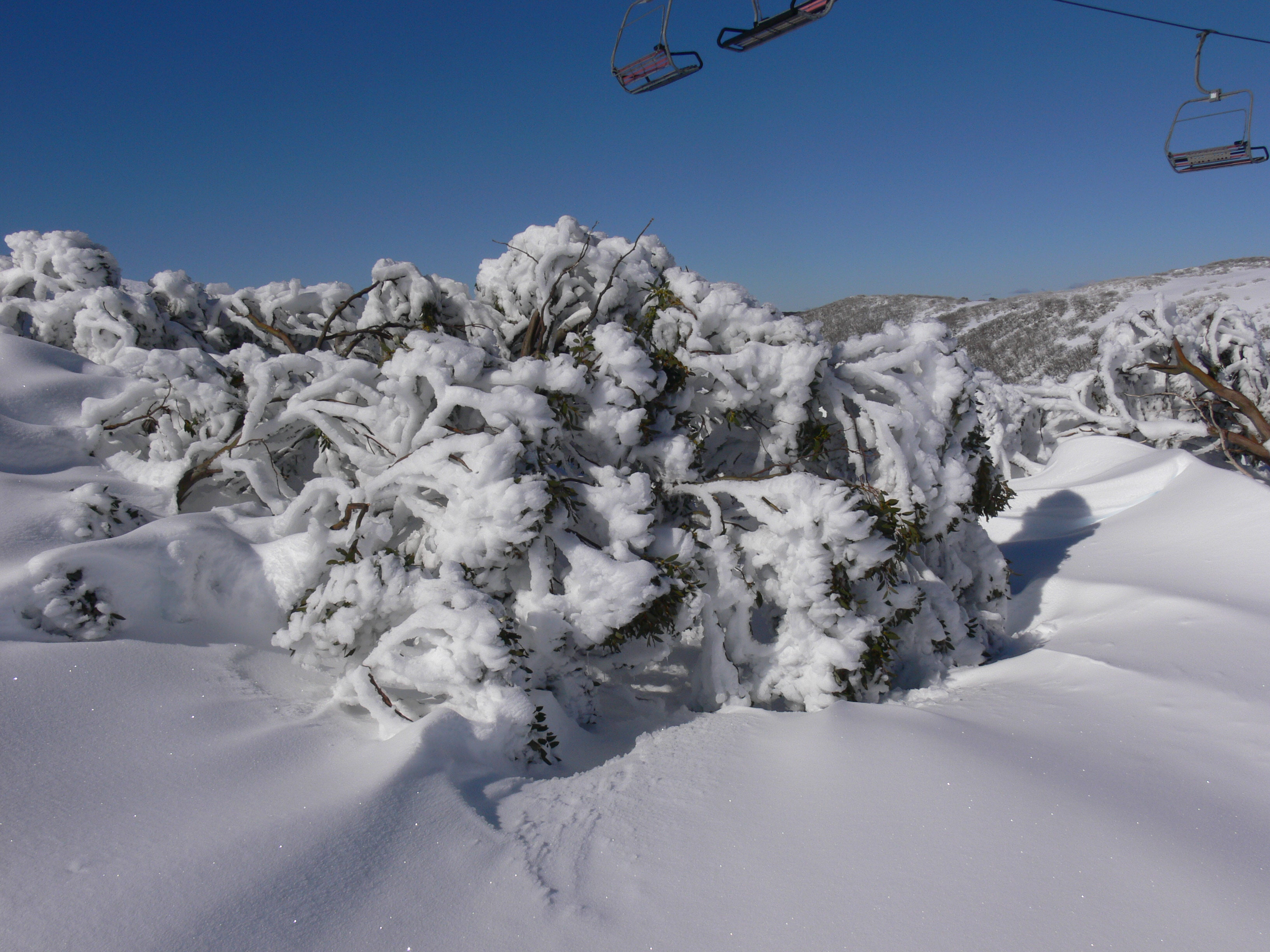
Image showing the tree's ability to survive in deep snow

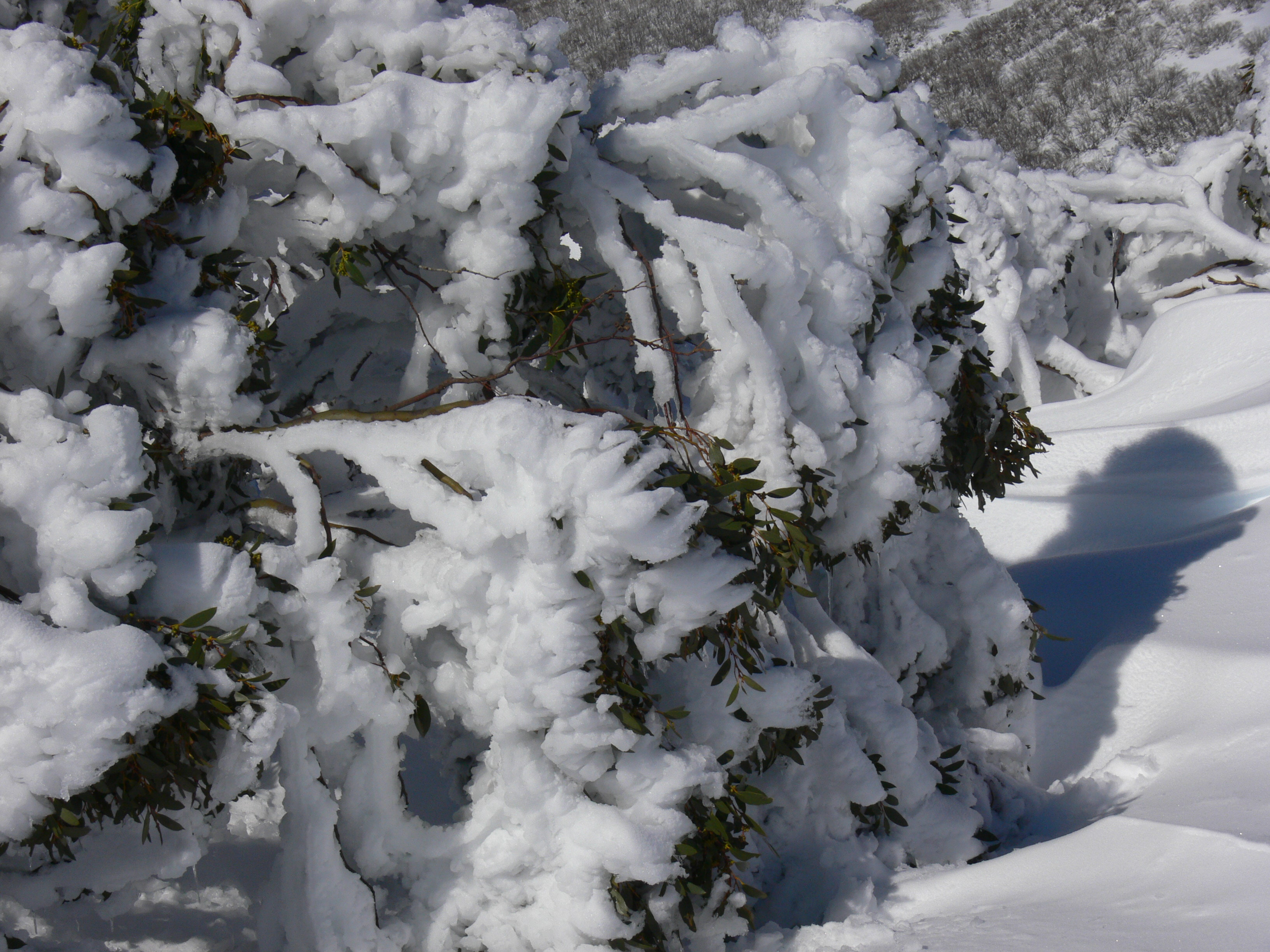
Image showing how the branches bend rather than break with the weight of the snow and how this causes snow to be lost from the leaves

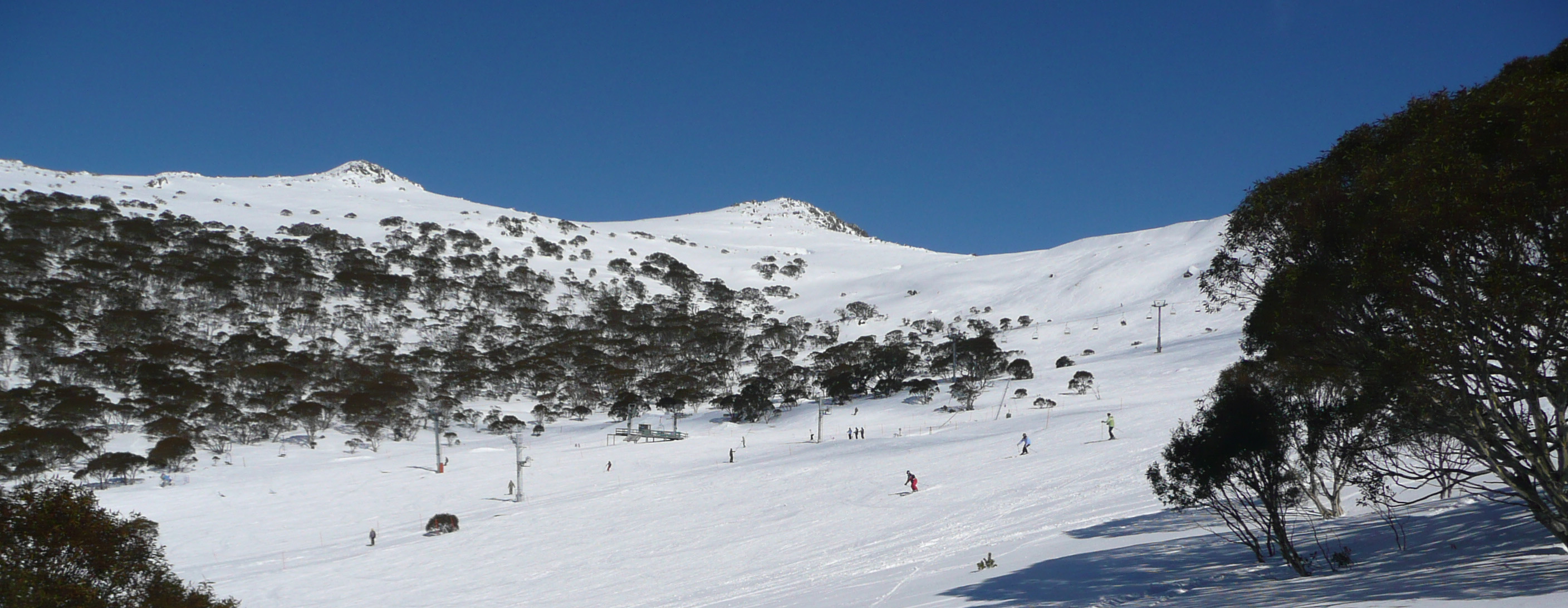
Snow gum woodland below the tree line

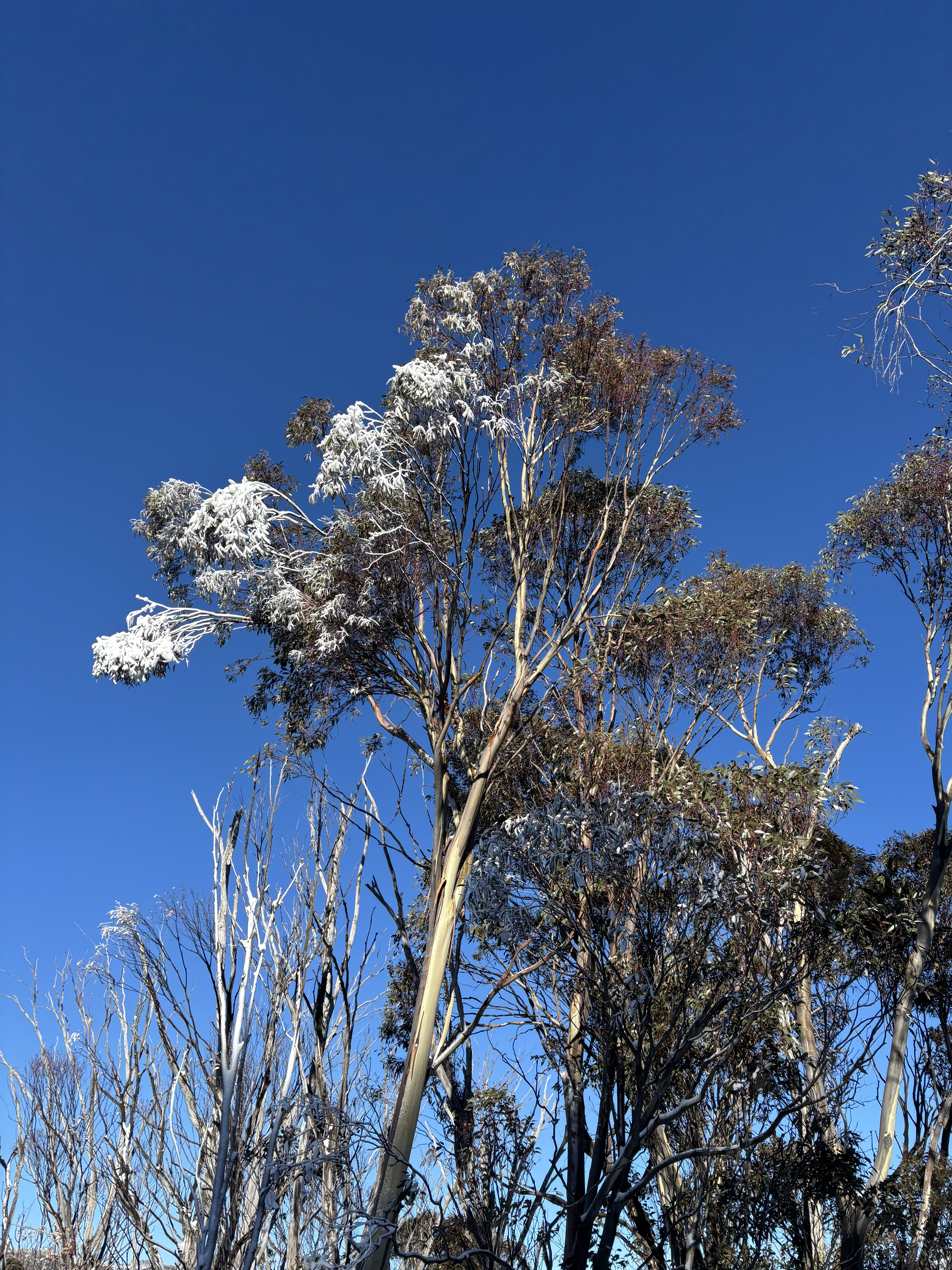
A tall snowgum in Thredbo
