= Eucalyptus baueriana subsp. thalassina =

Werribee blue box

Scientific classification
- Kingdom: Plantae
- Clade: Tracheophytes
- Clade: Angiosperms
- Clade: Eudicots
- Clade: Rosids
- Order: Myrtales
- Family: Myrtaceae
- Genus: Eucalyptus
- Species: E. baueriana
- Subspecies: E. b. subsp. thalassina

Trinomial name
- Eucalyptus baueriana subsp. thalassina Rule

Subspecies of eucalyptus

Eucalyptus baueriana subsp. thalassina, commonly known as Werribee blue box, is a subspecies of Eucalyptus baueriana that is endemic to Victoria. It was first formally described by taxonomist Kevin Rule in Muelleria in 2011.
