= Long Forest Nature Conservation Reserve =

Australian nature conservation area

- IUCN category Ia (strict nature reserve)
- Location within Victoria
- Location: Victoria
- Nearest city: Bacchus Marsh
- Coordinates: 37°38′40″S 144°29′50″E
- Area: 6 km^{2} (2.3 sq mi)
- Governing body: Parks Victoria
- Website: Official website

Long Forest Nature Conservation Reserve is a 600-hectare (1,500-acre) protected area in the Australian state of Victoria situated 50 kilometres (31 mi) to the west of the state capital of Melbourne, between Melton and Bacchus Marsh. It is managed by Parks Victoria.

== Flora ==
The nature conservation reserve has over 400 native plant species. It contains a Rocky Chenopod Scrub community that includes the bull mallee, marking the only occurrence of a mallee species south of the Great Dividing Range. Other tree species found in the nature conservation reserve include grey box, Werribee blue box, yellow gum and moonah. Shrub species include turkey bush and sixteen species of saltbush including fragrant saltbush.

== Fauna ==
Mammal species in the nature conservation reserve include the eastern grey kangaroo, black-tailed wallaby, koala brush-tailed possum, and short-beaked echidna. Over 160 bird species have been sighted in the nature conservation reserve, including the barking owl, crested bellbird, diamond firetail, jacky winter, red-capped robin and speckled warbler.

== Access and facilities ==
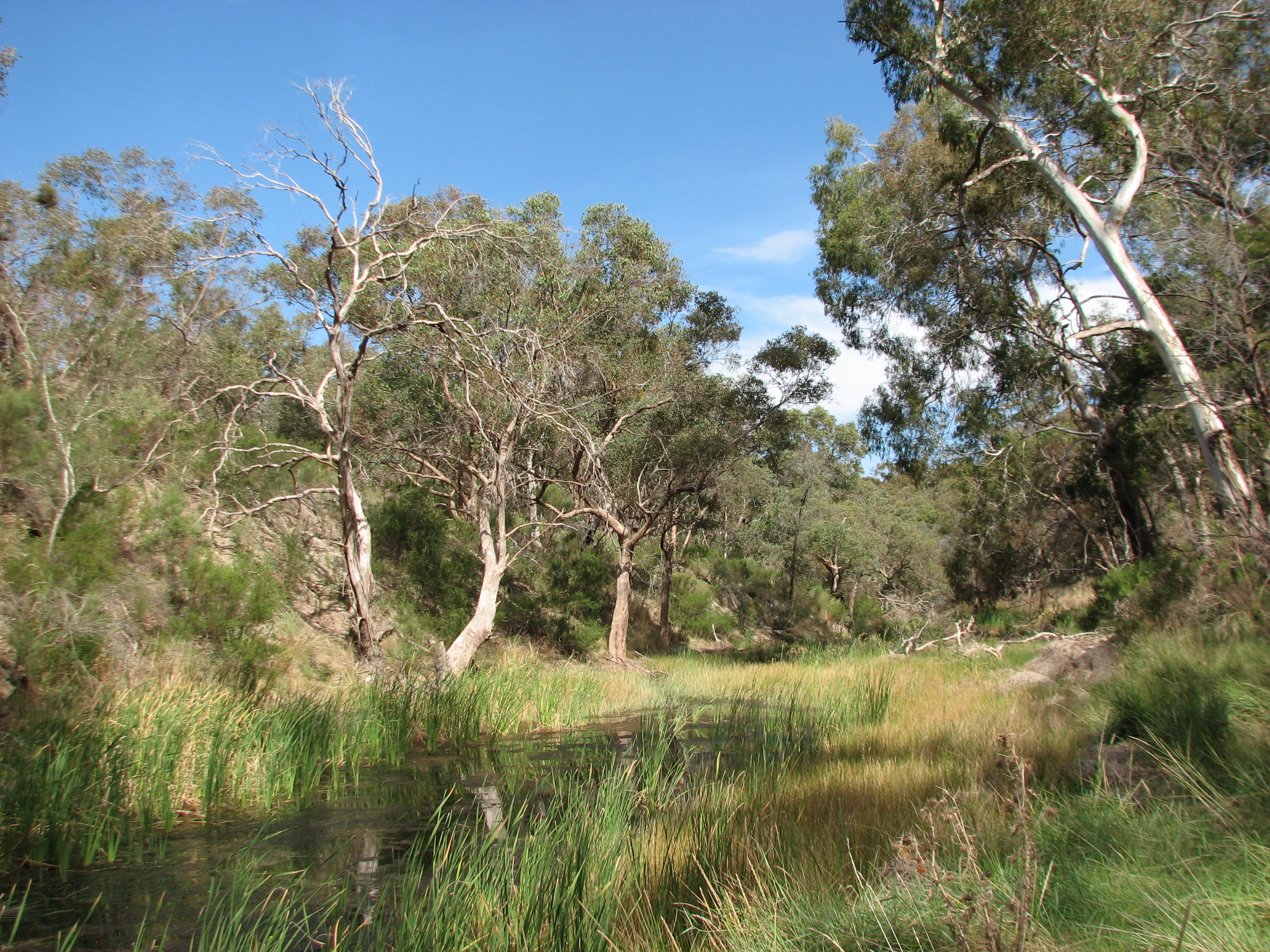
Coimadai Creek

The nature conservation reserve is accessed via Long Forest Road, which runs northwards from the Western Highway. Car parks with information boards are located at the entrance to the Happy Valley Track and on Canopus Circuit. These provide access to walking tracks that lead to Coimadai Creek. Walking tracks leading to Djerriwarrh Creek are accessed from parking areas at Djerriwarrh Track to the south and Moonah Drive to the north. Additionally, there are other several sites along Long Forest Road and in Canopus Circuit where you can access additional walking tracks.
