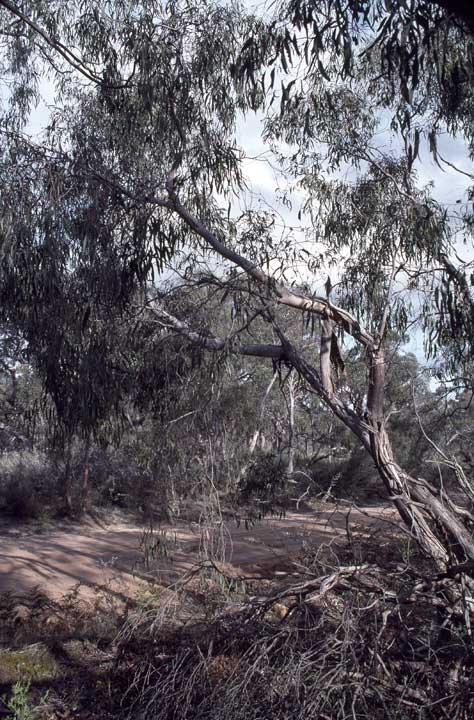

Conservation status
- Vulnerable (IUCN 3.1)

Scientific classification
- Kingdom: Plantae
- Clade: Tracheophytes
- Clade: Angiosperms
- Clade: Eudicots
- Clade: Rosids
- Order: Myrtales
- Family: Myrtaceae
- Genus: Eucalyptus
- Species: E. falciformis

Binomial name
- Eucalyptus falciformis (Newnham, Ladiges & Whiffin) Rule

Synonyms
- Eucalyptus willisii subsp. falciformis Newnham, Ladiges & Whiffin

= Eucalyptus falciformis =

Grampians peppermint

Species of eucalyptus

Eucalyptus falciformis, commonly known as the Grampians peppermint or western peppermint, is a species of tree or mallee that is endemic to south eastern Australia. It has smooth bark, sometimes with rough, fibrous bark at the base, narrow lance-shaped to egg-shaped or curved adult leaves, flower buds in groups of eleven to twenty one, white flowers and cup-shaped to shortly cylindrical fruit.

== Description ==
Eucalyptus falciformis is a tree that typically grows to a height of 5–14 m (16–46 ft) or often a mallee. It has smooth, pale grey to cream-coloured bark, often with rough, grey, fibrous or plate-like bark at the base. Young plants and coppice regrowth have dull bluish green, sessile leaves mostly arranged in opposite pairs and 80–170 mm (3.1–6.7 in) long and 15–70 mm (0.59–2.76 in) wide. Adult leaves are arranged alternately, lance-shaped to curved, the same glossy green on both sides, 75–180 mm (3.0–7.1 in) long and 10–30 mm (0.39–1.18 in) wide on a petiole 9–20 mm (0.35–0.79 in) long. The flower buds are arranged in leaf axils on unbranched peduncle 2–8 mm (0.079–0.315 in) long, the individual buds on pedicels 2–7 mm (0.079–0.276 in) long. Mature buds are oval to club-shaped, 3–5 mm (0.12–0.20 in) long and 3–4 mm (0.12–0.16 in) wide with a hemispherical to conical operculum that is shorter than the floral cup. Flowering occurs between September and December and the flowers are white. The fruit is a woody, cup-shaped to shortly cylindrical capsule 5–8 mm (0.20–0.31 in) long and wide.

== Taxonomy and naming ==
The Grampians peppermint was first formally described in 1986 by M.R. Newnham, Pauline Ladiges and Trevor Whiffin and given the name Eucalyptus willisii subsp. falciformis and the description was published in the Australian Journal of Botany. In 2008, Kevin Rule raised it to species status as E. falciformis. The specific epithet (falciformis) is derived from the Latin word meaning "sickle-shaped", referring to the shape of the juvenile leaves. The earlier epithet (willisii) honours the botanist James Hamlyn Willis.

== Distribution and habitat ==
This eucalypt grows on sandy soils in heathy woodland near the coast in Victoria between Anglesea and the South Australian border and in the Grampians. It also occurs in similar habitats in the far south-east of South Australia near Millicent and Naracoorte.

== See also ==
- List of Eucalyptus species
