= Eucalyptus silvestris =

Conservation status
- Critically Endangered (IUCN 3.1)

Scientific classification
- Kingdom: Plantae
- Clade: Tracheophytes
- Clade: Angiosperms
- Clade: Eudicots
- Clade: Rosids
- Order: Myrtales
- Family: Myrtaceae
- Genus: Eucalyptus
- Species: E. silvestris

Binomial name
- Eucalyptus silvestris Rule

Species of eucalyptus

Eucalyptus silvestris is a species of mallee or small tree that is endemic to Victoria, Australia. It has rough, fibrous or flaky bark on the trunk and larger branches, smooth greyish brown bark above, glossy green, lance-shaped leaves, flower buds usually in groups of seven, white flowers and conical to cup-shaped fruit.

== Description ==
Eucalyptus silvestris is a spreading tree or tall mallee that typically grows to a height of 12 m (39 ft) and has rough, grey, fibrous or flaky bark on the trunk and the base of the larger branches, smooth greyish brown bark above. Young plants and coppice regrowth have dull green or bluish, narrow lance-shaped leaves that are up to 80 mm (3.1 in) long and 30 mm (1.2 in) wide. Adult leaves are glossy green, lance-shaped, 60–100 mm (2.4–3.9 in) long and 12–22 mm (0.47–0.87 in) wide and petiolate. The flower buds are arranged in leaf axils in groups of five, seven or nine on an unbranched peduncle up to 10 mm (0.39 in) long, the individual buds on pedicels. Mature buds are spindle-shaped to club-shaped, up to 5 mm (0.20 in) long and 4 mm (0.16 in) wide with a conical operculum. Flowering occurs in autumn and the flowers are white. The fruit is a woody, conical, cylindrical or cup-shaped capsule about 5 mm (0.20 in) long and 4 mm (0.16 in) wide with the valves below rim level.

== Taxonomy ==
Eucalyptus silvestris was first formally described in 1994 by Kevin James Rule from material he collected near Yanac, north of Nhill, Victoria in 1990. The specific epithet (silvestris) is derived from Latin, referring to the woodland habitat of this species.

== Distribution and habitat ==
This eucalypts occurs in scattered locations in undulating farmland on well-drained rises from Servicton and Yanac in Victoria, to between Bordertown and Bangham in South Australia.

== See also ==
- List of Eucalyptus species
