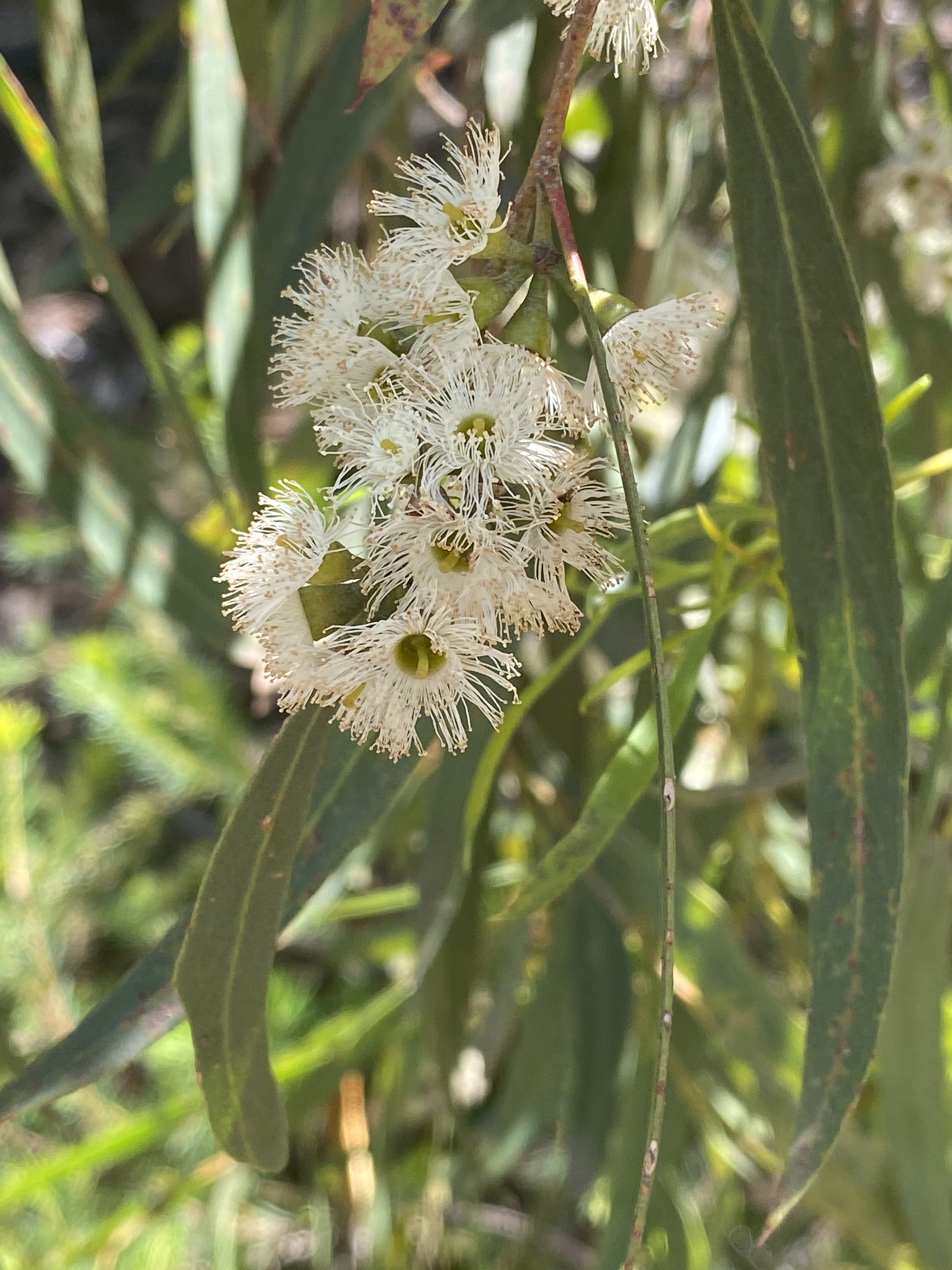
- Flowers of Eucalyptus wimmerensis

Conservation status
- Vulnerable (IUCN 3.1)

Scientific classification
- Kingdom: Plantae
- Clade: Tracheophytes
- Clade: Angiosperms
- Clade: Eudicots
- Clade: Rosids
- Order: Myrtales
- Family: Myrtaceae
- Genus: Eucalyptus
- Species: E. wimmerensis

Binomial name
- Eucalyptus wimmerensis Rule

Synonyms
- Eucalyptus polybractea subsp. subcerea Rule; Eucalyptus viridis subsp. wimmerensis (Rule) Brooker & Slee; Eucalyptus walshii Rule; Eucalyptus wimmerensis subsp. arapilensis Rule; Eucalyptus wimmerensis subsp. grata Rule; Eucalyptus wimmerensis subsp. pallida Rule; Eucalyptus wimmerensis subsp. parviformis Rule

= Eucalyptus wimmerensis =

Wimmera mallee box

Species of eucalyptus

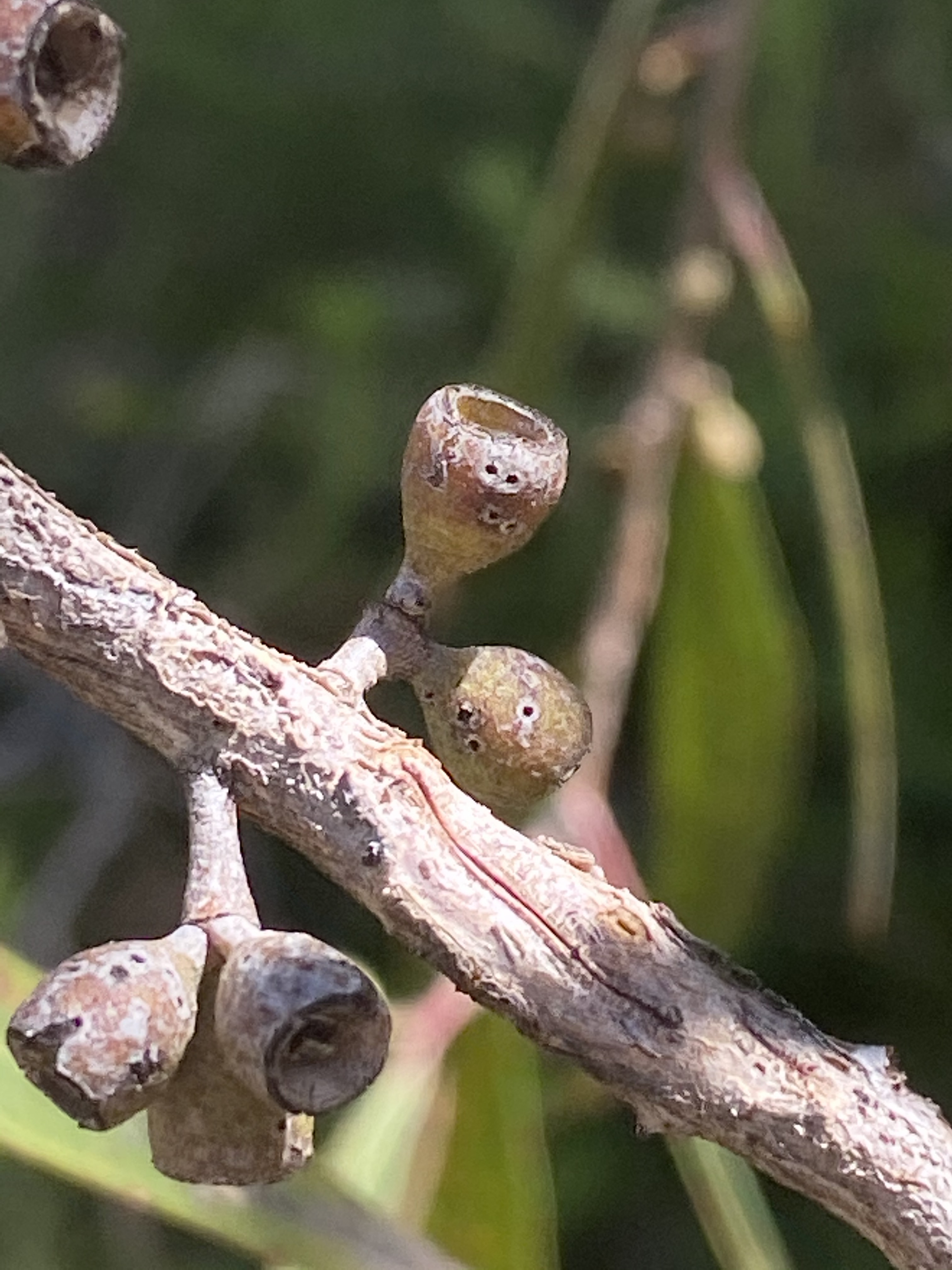
Fruit

Eucalyptus wimmerensis, commonly known as the Wimmera mallee box or the broad-leaved green mallee, is a species of mallee that is endemic to an area around the border between Victoria and South Australia. It usually has smooth bark on the trunk and branches, linear to narrow oblong leaves, flower buds in groups of seven to eleven, white flowers and cup-shaped to barrel-shaped fruit.

== Description ==
Eucalyptus wimmerensis is a multi-stemmed and often erect mallee that typically grows to height of 4 m (13 ft) rarely to 12 m (39 ft) but never a tree. It has smooth grey, tan or cream-coloured bark, sometimes with fibrous bark near the base. Young plants have dull bluish to greyish green, linear to narrow lance-shaped or narrow oblong leaves that are about 65 mm (2.6 in) long and 16 mm (0.63 in) wide. Adult leaves are the same shade of glossy green on both sides, linear to narrow lance-shaped, narrow oblong or curved, up to 50–80 mm (2.0–3.1 in) long and 8–15 mm (0.31–0.59 in) wide on a petiole up to 13 mm (0.51 in) long. The flower buds are arranged in leaf axils in groups of seven to eleven on a peduncle up to 5–13 mm (0.20–0.51 in) long, the individual buds on pedicels 4–6 mm (0.16–0.24 in) long. Mature buds are spindle-shaped to club-shaped, 5–6 mm (0.20–0.24 in) long and 3–4 mm (0.12–0.16 in) wide with a rounded to bluntly cone-shaped operculum that is shorter than the floral cup. Flowering occurs from summer to late autumn and the flowers are white. The fruit is a woody cup-shaped to barrel-shaped capsule about 6 mm (0.24 in) long and wide with the valves below rim level.

== Taxonomy and naming ==
Eucalyptus wimmerensis was first formally described in 1990 by Kevin James Rule in the journal Muelleria from specimens collected in 1964 by James Hamlyn Willis on the Lawloit Range between Nhill and Kaniva. The specific epithet (wimmerensis) refers to the Wimmera region of Victoria where this species occurs.

In 2018, Rule described five subspecies, but the names have not been accepted by the Australian Plant Census:

- Eucalyptus wimmerensis subsp. arapilensis Rule;
- Eucalyptus wimmerensis subsp. grata Rule;
- Eucalyptus wimmerensis subsp. pallida Rule;
- Eucalyptus wimmerensis subsp. parviformis Rule;
- Eucalyptus wimmerensis Rule subsp. wimmerensis.

== Distribution and habitat ==
The Wimmera mallee box has a scattered distribution in the Little Desert National Park and adjacent area of South Australia. It is most common between Dimboola and Nhill and between Nhill and Kaniva, where it grows in sandy soils or gravelly loams in mallee vegetation or mixed mallee woodland. As with some other Eucalypts, it occurs in lands cleared for agriculture. As a result, it is difficult to relate its distribution to the natural state. Some stands of E. wimmerensis include hybrids, even with the distantly related mallees of the E. dumosa group.

== See also ==
- List of Eucalyptus species
