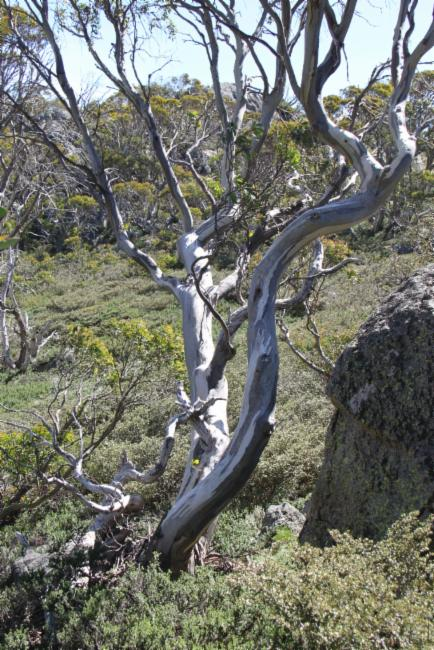
- Subspecies niphophila near the summit of Mount Kosciuszko

Scientific classification
- Kingdom: Plantae
- Clade: Embryophytes
- Clade: Tracheophytes
- Clade: Spermatophytes
- Clade: Angiosperms
- Clade: Eudicots
- Clade: Rosids
- Order: Myrtales
- Family: Myrtaceae
- Genus: Eucalyptus
- Species: E. pauciflora
- Subspecies: E. p. subsp. niphophila

Trinomial name
- Eucalyptus pauciflora subsp. niphophila (Maiden & Blakely) L.A.S.Johnson & Blaxell

= Eucalyptus pauciflora subsp. niphophila =

Snow gum

Subspecies of eucalyptus

Eucalyptus pauciflora subsp. niphophila, commonly known as snow gum, is a small tree or large shrub that is native to a few mountain peaks in eastern Australia. It has smooth bark, glossy green, lance-shaped to egg-shaped or elliptical leaves, flower buds in groups of between nine and fifteen, white flowers and cup-shaped, hemispherical or conical fruit. It differs from other subspecies of E. pauciflora in having more delicate, pedicellate flower buds and smaller leaves.

== Description ==
Eucalyptus pauciflora subsp. niphophila is a tree or shrub that typically grows to a height of 7 m (23 ft) and forms a lignotuber. The bark is smooth, grey, white or cream-coloured with patches of yellow and pink, and the branchlets are glaucous. Young plants and coppice regrowth have dull bluish green or glaucous, egg-shaped leaves that are 25–75 mm (0.98–2.95 in) long, 20–35 mm (0.79–1.38 in) wide and petiolate. Adult leaves are lance-shaped, egg-shaped or elliptical, 50–100 mm (2.0–3.9 in) long and 12–30 mm (0.47–1.18 in) wide on a petiole 10–20 mm (0.39–0.79 in) long. The flower buds are arranged in leaf axils in groups of between nine and fifteen on an unbranched peduncle 5–10 mm (0.20–0.39 in) long, the individual buds on pedicels up to 4 mm (0.16 in) long. Mature buds are oval to club-shaped, 4–8 mm (0.16–0.31 in) long and 3–6 mm (0.12–0.24 in) wide with a rounded to beaked operculum. Flowering has been recorded between December and February and the flowers are white. The fruit is a woody cup-shaped, conical or hemispherical capsule 6–10 mm (0.24–0.39 in) long and wide with the valves near rim level or below it. Subspecies niphophila differs from others in the species in having more delicate, pedicellate flower buds, small leaves and glaucous branchlets, buds and fruit.

== Taxonomy and naming ==
Eucalyptus niphophila was first formally described in 1929 by Joseph Maiden and William Blakely in Maiden's book A Critical Revision of the Genus Eucalyptus, from material collected near "Pretty Point" on Mount Kosciuszko. In 1973, Lawrie Johnson and Donald Blaxell reduced the species to a subspecies of E. pauciflora as E. pauciflora subsp. niphophila. The epithet (niphophila) is derived from ancient Greek meaning "snow-loving", referring to the alpine habitat of this eucalypt.

== Distribution and habitat ==
This subspecies occurs on the highest peaks suitable for tree growth in the Snowy Mountains, including in the Kosciuszko National Park, extending to Bimberi Peak in the Australian Capital Territory and the highest peaks in Victoria, including Mount Hotham, Mount Bogong, Mount Torbreck and Mount Wellington.
