= Mount Useful =

Mountain in Victoria, Australia

- Location within Victoria

Highest point
- Elevation: 1,436 metres (4,711 ft) AHD (approx.)
- Coordinates: 37°41′41″S 146°30′19″E

Geography
- Country: Australia
- State: Victoria
- Parent range: Great Dividing Range

Mount Useful is a mountain located to the west of Licola in Victoria, Australia. The summit lies within the Mount Useful Natural Features and Scenic Reserve, which was established in 1979 and covers 354 hectares (875 acres). The mountain has basalt cliffs with columnar jointing on the east and south-east sides.

A fire lookout tower and a communications tower (primarily utilised by Telstra) are located on the summit.

== See also ==
- Alpine National Park
- List of mountains in Australia § Victoria
