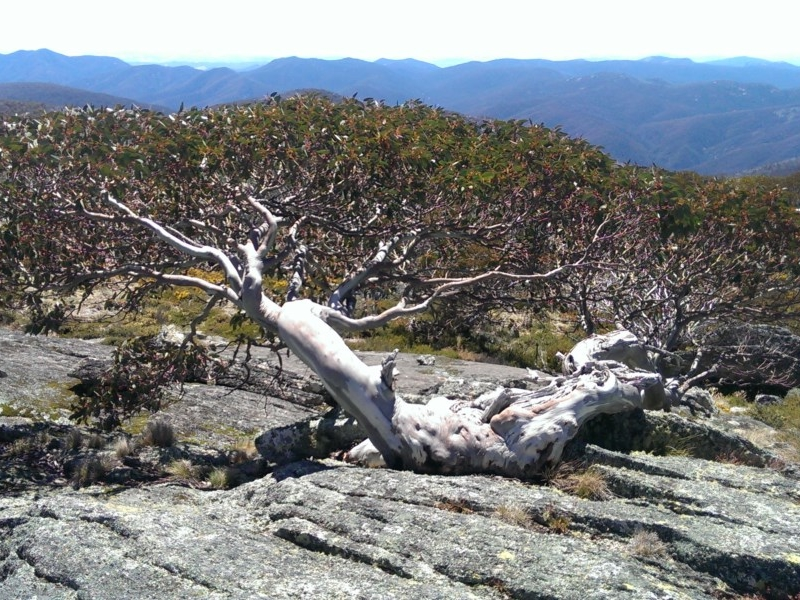
- Subspecies debeuzevillei on the summit of Mount Gingera

Scientific classification
- Kingdom: Plantae
- Clade: Embryophytes
- Clade: Tracheophytes
- Clade: Spermatophytes
- Clade: Angiosperms
- Clade: Eudicots
- Clade: Rosids
- Order: Myrtales
- Family: Myrtaceae
- Genus: Eucalyptus
- Species: E. pauciflora
- Subspecies: E. p. subsp. debeuzevillei

Trinomial name
- Eucalyptus pauciflora subsp. debeuzevillei (Maiden) L.A.S.Johnson & Blaxell

= Eucalyptus pauciflora subsp. debeuzevillei =

Jounama snow gum

Subspecies of eucalyptus

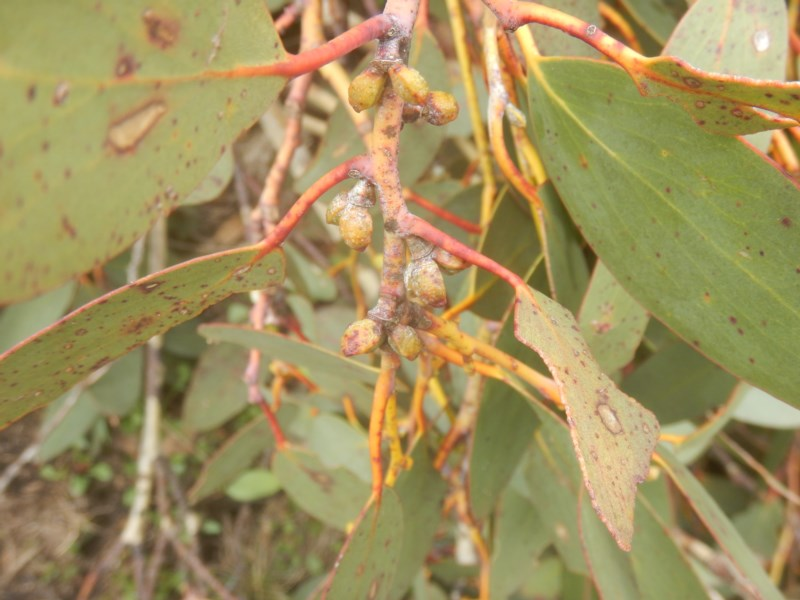
Flower buds

Eucalyptus pauciflora subsp. debeuzevillei, commonly known as Jounama snow gum, is a mallee or small tree that is native to a few mountain peaks in south-eastern Australia. It has smooth, shiny bark, glossy green lance-shaped to egg-shaped leaves, flower buds in groups of between nine and fifteen, white flowers and hemispherical or conical fruit. It differs from other subspecies of E. pauciflora in having angular flower buds.

== Description ==
Eucalyptus pauciflora subsp. debeuzevillei is a mallee or tree that typically grows to a height of 12 m (39 ft) and forms a lignotuber. The branchlets are usually glaucous. The bark is smooth, grey, white, cream-coloured or light brown and often has insect scribbles. Young plants and coppice regrowth have dull bluish green or glaucous, egg-shaped to broadly lance-shaped leaves that are 60–90 mm (2.4–3.5 in) long and 30–55 mm (1.2–2.2 in) wide and petiolate. Adult leaves are broadly lance-shaped to lance-shaped or curved, 75–180 mm (3.0–7.1 in) long and 16–50 mm (0.63–1.97 in) wide on a petiole 12–25 mm (0.47–0.98 in) long. The flower buds are arranged in leaf axils in groups of between nine and fifteen on an unbranched peduncle 4–13 mm (0.16–0.51 in) long, the individual buds on pedicels up to 2 mm (0.079 in) long. Mature buds are club-shaped to oblong, 8–12 mm (0.31–0.47 in) long and 4–6 mm (0.16–0.24 in) wide with a conical operculum. Flowering has been recorded in December and January and the flowers are white. The fruit is a woody cup-shaped, barrel-shaped or conical capsule 8–13 mm (0.31–0.51 in) long and 7–12 mm (0.28–0.47 in) wide with the valves near rim level or below it. Subspecies debeuzevillei differs from others in the species in having mature buds that are strongly angular.

== Taxonomy and naming ==
Eucalyptus debeuzevillei was first formally described in 1920 by Joseph Maiden in the Journal and Proceedings of the Royal Society of New South Wales, from material collected by Wilfred Alexander de Beuzeville. In 1973, Lawrie Johnson and Donald Blaxell reduced the species to a subspecies of E. pauciflora as E. pauciflora subsp. debeuzevillei. The epithet (debeuzevillei) presumably honours the collector of the type.

== Distribution and habitat ==
This subspecies occurs on the highest peaks south from Mount Franklin in the Australian Capital Territory to near Yarrangobilly in New South Wales and Mount Buffalo in Victoria.
