= Mount Torbreck =

Mountain in Victoria, Australia

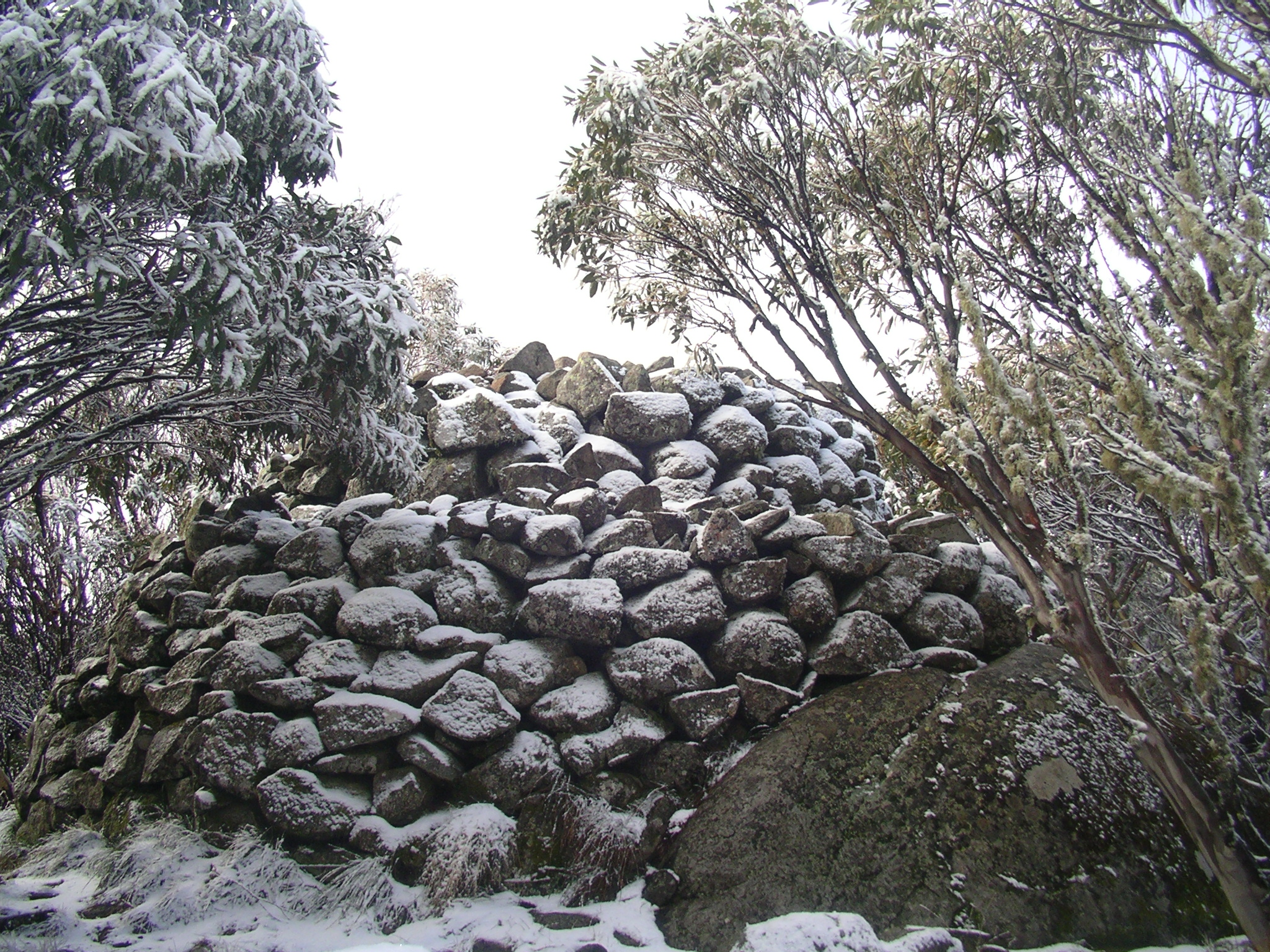
- The summit cairn on Mount Torbreck in early winter

Highest point
- Elevation: 1,516 m (4,974 ft)
- Coordinates: 37°22′S 145°56′E

Geography
- Location within Shire of Murrindindi
- Location: Victoria, Australia
- Parent range: Great Dividing Range

Climbing
- First ascent: Unknown
- Easiest route: Hike

Mount Torbreck is a mountain (elevation 1516 metres) in Victoria, Australia 150 km from Melbourne. The mountain was listed as a place that could be declared as an alpine resort in The Alpine Resorts Act 1983, however no resort was ever developed on the site and it was recommended to be changed to a natural and scenic features reserve in 1994.

Mount Torbreck was the site of a plane crash involving an RAAF Avro Anson on 16 May 1940. The RAAF conducted an extensive search but could not locate the plane. The wreck and bodies of, Flying Officer Anthony Daniel and Corporals Francis Hyland, Fred Sass and Ivan Stowdor were found by two high country bushmen the following year in January 1941. A memorial dedicated to those four men was established at the crash site in the mid-1960s. After dense forest regrowth from bushfires, the memorials location had almost been forgotten about until 2013 when a group of volunteers had dedicated their time to restoring it and the access track to it. As of 23 August 2014 for the first time in decades the memorial is now accessible from the intersection of Barnewall Plains and Torbreck Roads.

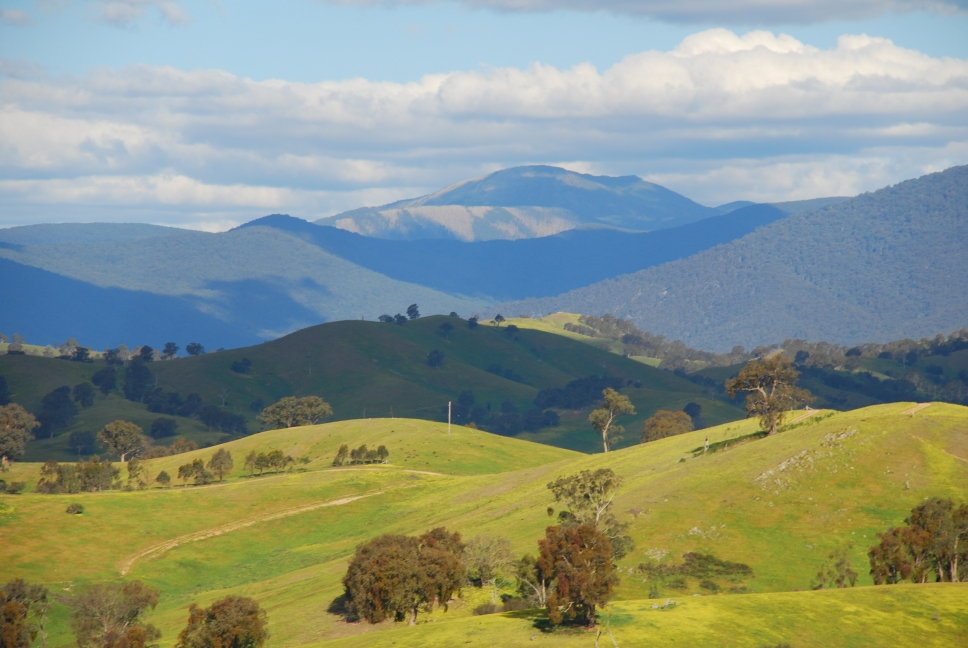
Mount Torbreck viewed from Maroondah Highway

== See also ==
- Alpine National Park
- List of mountains in Australia § Victoria
