= Muelleria (journal) =

Peer-reviewed journal

- Discipline: Botany
- Language: English
- Edited by: Alastair Robinson

Publication details
- History: 1955–present
- Publisher: Royal Botanic Gardens Victoria (Australia)
- Frequency: Annually
- Open access: Yes

Standard abbreviations
- ISO 4: Muelleria

Indexing
- CODEN: MAJBAC
- ISSN: 0077-1813
- LCCN: 95655014
- OCLC no.: 01641190

Links
- Journal homepage

Muelleria is a peer-reviewed scientific journal on botany published by the Royal Botanic Gardens Victoria. It focuses on topics relating to plants, algae, and fungi in the southern hemisphere and Australia in particular. The journal was named in honour of Victorian Government botanist Ferdinand von Mueller. Muelleria commenced publication in 1955 with funding from the Maud Gibson Trust. The trust was initiated in 1945 following the donation of £20,000 by Maud Gibson, a daughter of William Gibson, founder of the Foy & Gibson department store chain.

Muelleria was one of a number of botanical journals initiated by Australian herbaria after World War II, reflecting the increased level of botanical research undertaken at this time. James Hamlyn Willis was the editor of the three initial issues.

Muelleria is available via the Biodiversity Heritage Library.

== Editors-in-chief ==
The following persons have been or are editor-in-chief:

- James Hamlyn Willis (Vol 1. 1956–1967)
- Rex Bertram Filson (Vol. 2-Vol. 3, no. 3. 1969–1976)
- Helen Isobel Aston (Vol. 3, no. 4-Vol. 6. 1977–1988)
- Donald Bruce Foreman (Vol. 7-Vol. 9. 1989–1996)
- James Walter Grimes (Vol. 10-Vol. 15. 1997–2001)
- Marco Duretto and Teresa Lebel (Vol. 16–17. 2002–2003)
- Teresa Lebel (Vol 18–30. 2004–2012)
- Teresa Lebel and Daniel J. Murphy (botanist) (Vol 26 no. 1. 2008. Acacia Special Issue)
- Teresa Lebel and Tom May (mycologist) (Vol 31. 2013)
- Tom May (mycologist) (Vol 32. 2014)
- Tom May (mycologist) and Teresa Lebel (Vol 33. 2014–2015)
- Teresa Lebel (Vol 34–36. 2015–2018)
- Alastair Robinson (Vol 37-current. 2018–current)
