= Kevin James Rule =

Australian botanist

Kevin James Rule was born at Daylesford, Victoria on 9 November 1941. He was a secondary school teacher and had a particular interest in the taxonomy of Australian eucalyptus. He discovered several new species in Victoria. He is an honorary associate of the Royal Botanic Gardens Victoria. His main field is in taxonomy, particularly eucalypts and as a botanical collector. In 2011 Kevin James Rule described three sub-species of Eucalyptus baueriana.
