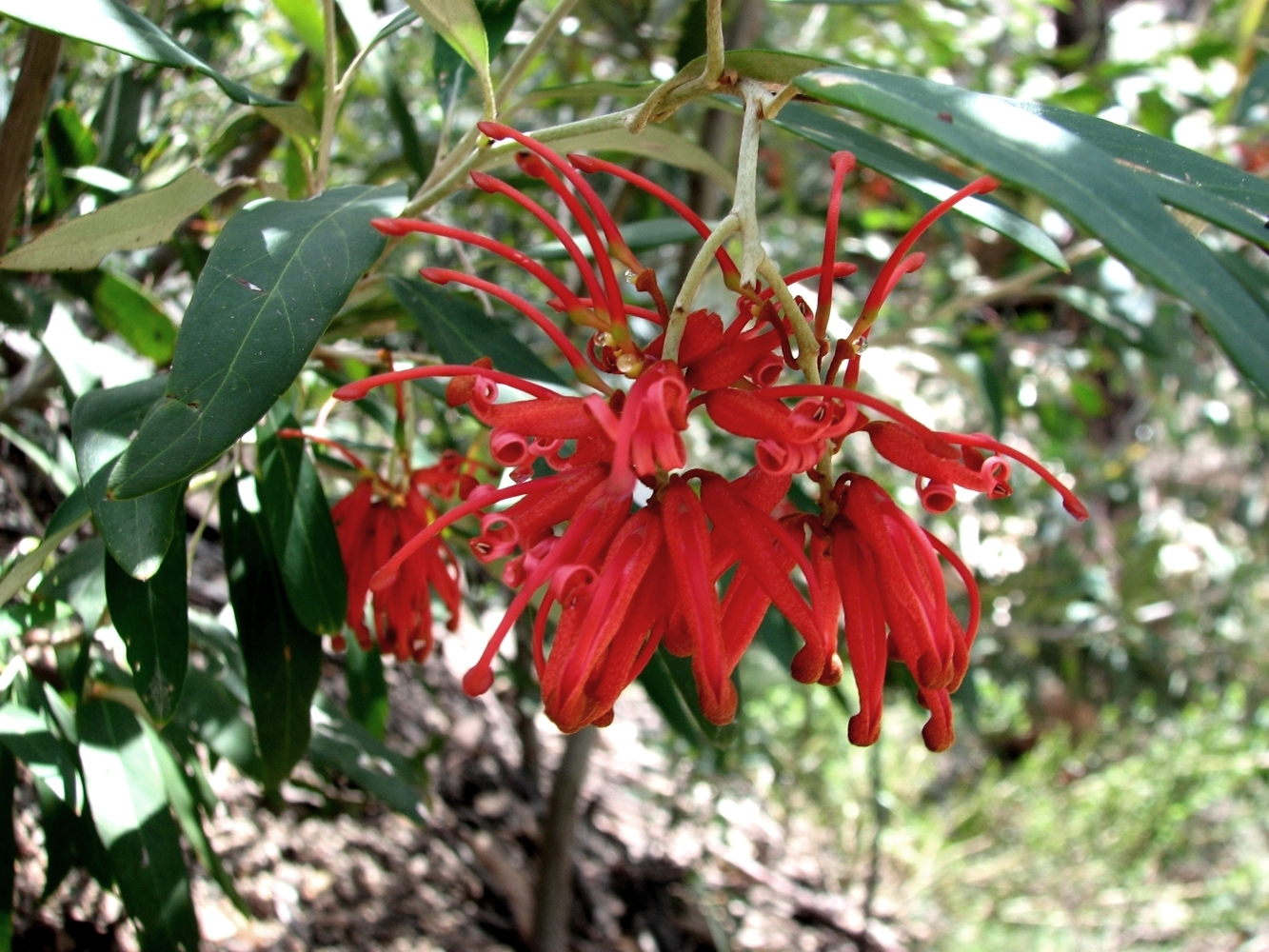
- Grevillea victoriae subsp. victoriae Mount Buffalo National Park, Victoria

Scientific classification
- Kingdom: Plantae
- Clade: Tracheophytes
- Clade: Angiosperms
- Clade: Eudicots
- Order: Proteales
- Family: Proteaceae
- Genus: Grevillea
- Species: G. victoriae

Binomial name
- Grevillea victoriae F.Muell.

Subspecies
- G. victoriae subsp. brindabella; G. victoriae subsp. nivalis; G. victoriae subsp. victoriae

Synonyms
- Grevillea victori J.Wrigley & Fagg orth. var.; Grevillea victoriae F.Muell. nom. inval., nom. nud.; Grevillea victoriae F.Muell. isonym; Grevillea victoriae F.Muell. var. victoriae

= Grevillea victoriae =

Royal grevillea

Species of shrub endemic to Australia

Grevillea victoriae, also known as royal grevillea or mountain grevillea, is a species of flowering plant in the family Proteaceae and is endemic to mountainous regions of south-eastern continental Australia. It is an erect to spreading shrub with elliptic to lance-shaped leaves, and pendulous clusters of red to orange flowers.

== Description ==
Grevillea victoriae is an erect to spreading shrub that grows to a height of 0.2–4 m (7.9 in – 13 ft 1.5 in) and has more or less silky-hairy branchlets. Its leaves are elliptic or narrowly elliptic to lance-shaped, sometimes egg-shaped, 60–120 mm (2.4–4.7 in) long and 10–35 mm (0.39–1.38 in) wide. The upper surface of the leaves is more or less glabrous and the lower surface is densely silky- or woolly-hairy. The flowers are red to orange and arranged on the ends of the branches or in leaf axils in pendant, conical to loose, sometimes branched clusters on a rachis 20–90 mm (0.79–3.54 in) long, the pistil 17–26 mm (0.67–1.02 in) long. Flowering may occur in any month, but mainly from August to January in the absence of snow. The fruit is a glabrous follicle 17–20 mm (0.67–0.79 in) long.

== Taxonomy ==
The species was first formally described by Victorian Government Botanist Ferdinand von Mueller, his description published in his book, Definitions of rare or hitherto undescribed Australian plants in 1855. Mueller discovered the species when he climbed to the plateau of Mount Buffalo in 1853. He described it as "a truly majestic plant, when, by descending into the vallies it assumes a height of 12 feet or more." The specific epithet victoriae was named for Queen Victoria.

Three subspecies of G. victoriae are accepted by the Australian Plant Census and Plants of the World Online:

- Grevillea victoriae subsp. brindabella Stajsic has leaves mostly 40–60 mm (1.6–2.4 in) long and 12–18 mm (0.47–0.71 in) wide with a dense layer of "tidy" silky hairs on the lower leaf surface concealing the underlying epidermis, and 38 to 50 flowers in each cluster;
- Grevillea victoriae subsp. nivalis Stajsic & Molyneux has leaves mostly 35–100 mm (1.4–3.9 in) long and 15–37 mm (0.59–1.46 in) wide with a dense layer of "messy" silky or woolly hairs on the lower leaf surface concealing the underlying epidermis, and 24 to 46 flowers in each cluster;
- Grevillea victoriae F.Muell. subsp. victoriae has leaves mostly 40–120 mm (1.6–4.7 in) long and 10–25 mm (0.39–0.98 in) wide with a dense layer of "tidy" silky hairs on the lower leaf surface concealing the underlying epidermis, and 22 to 48 flowers in each cluster.

=== Grevillea victoriae complex ===
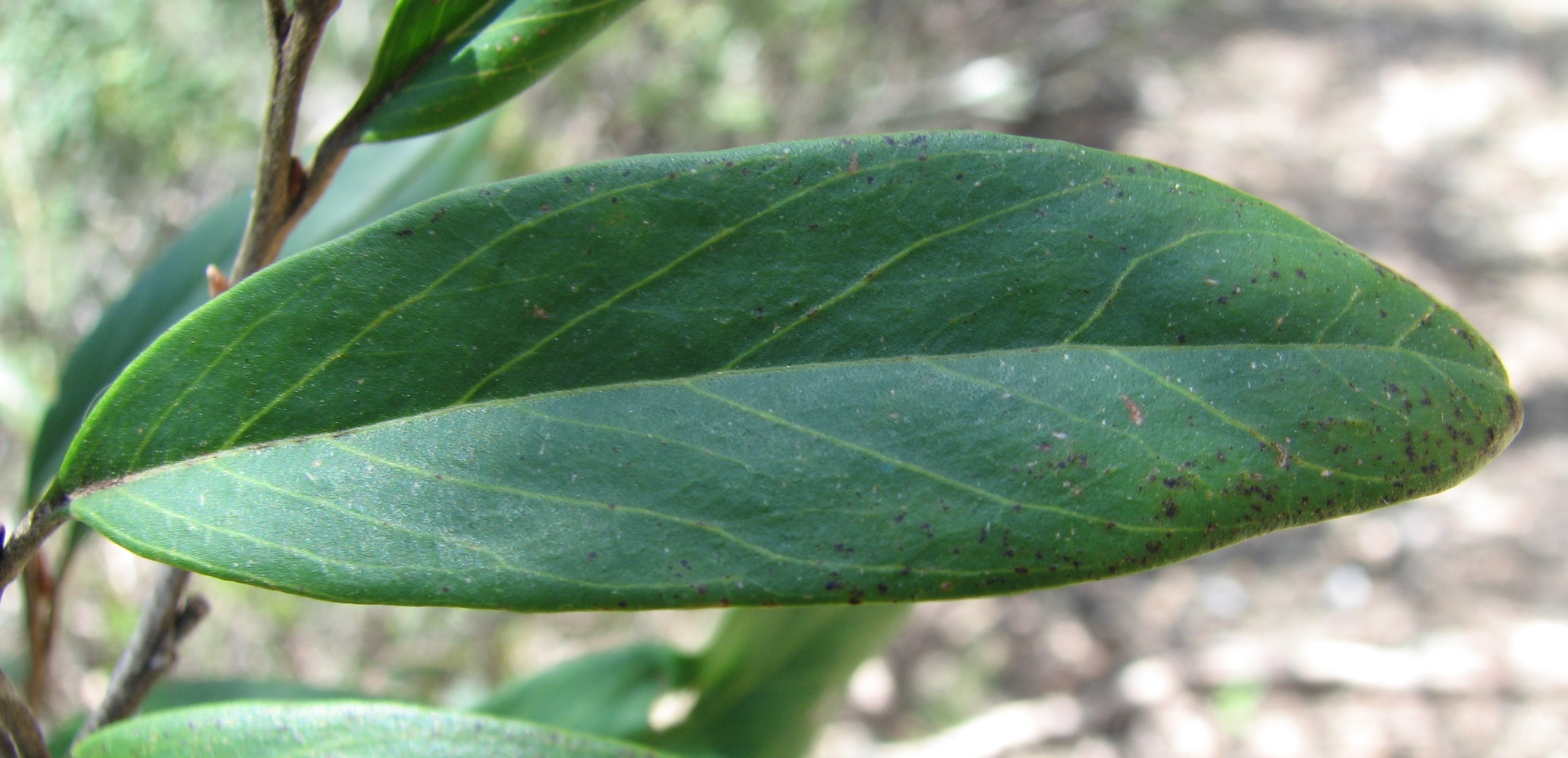
Upper leaf surface of subsp. victoriae

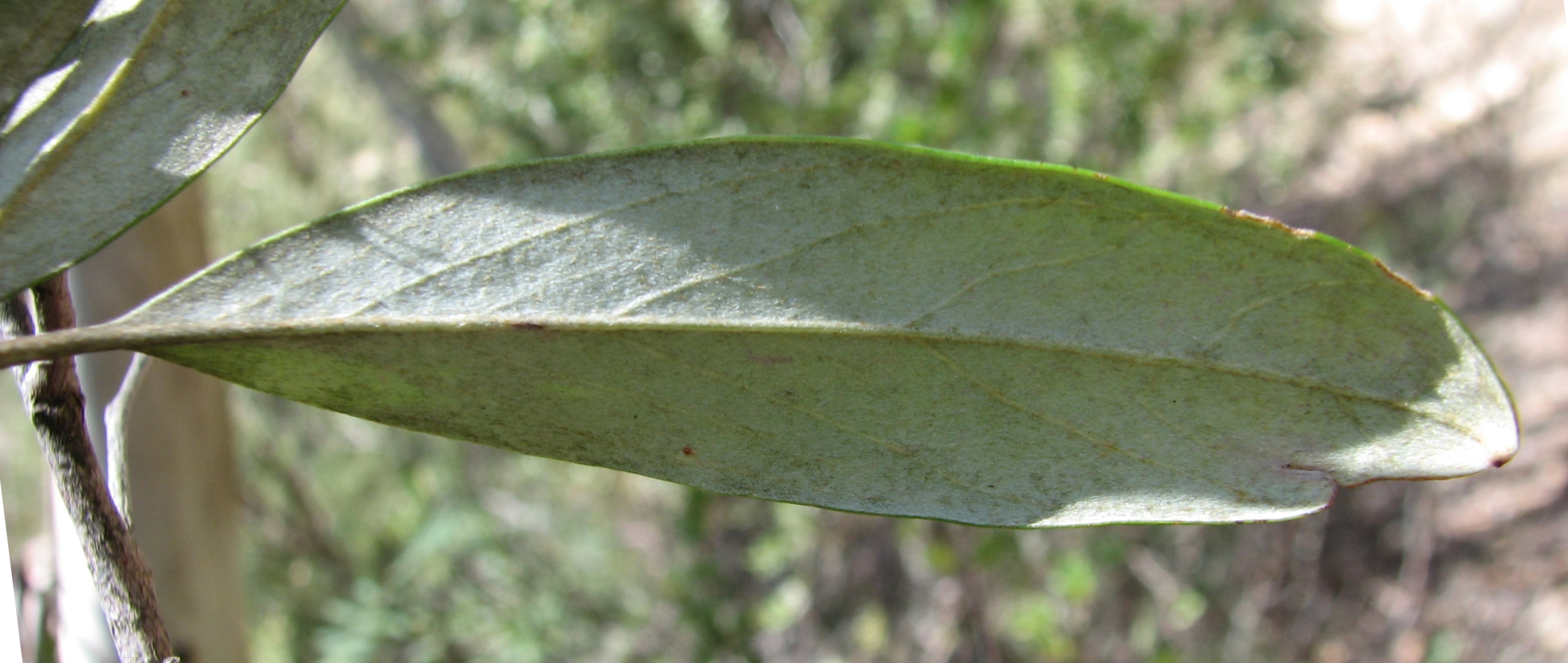
Lower leaf surface of subsp. victoriae

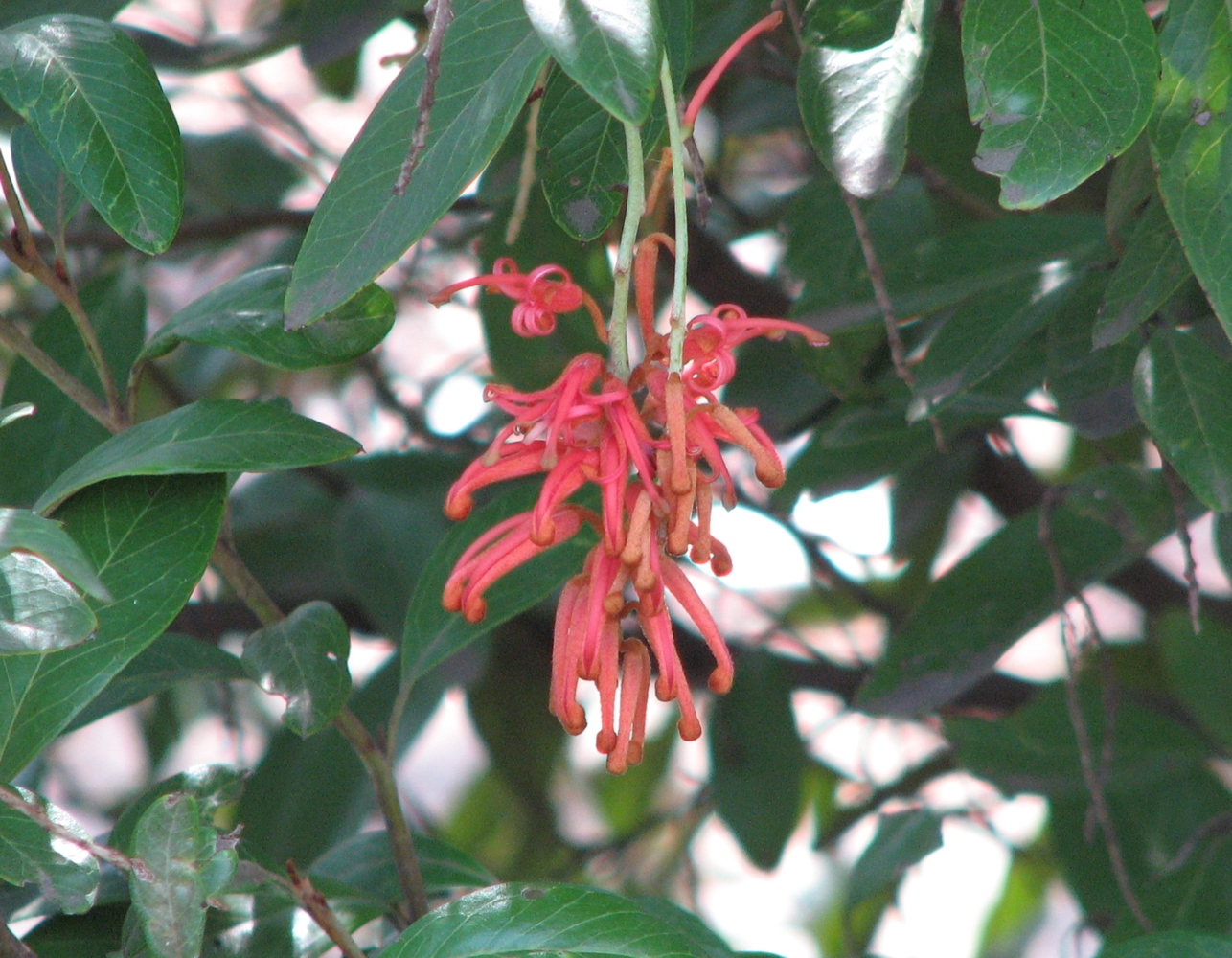
Subspecies nivalis

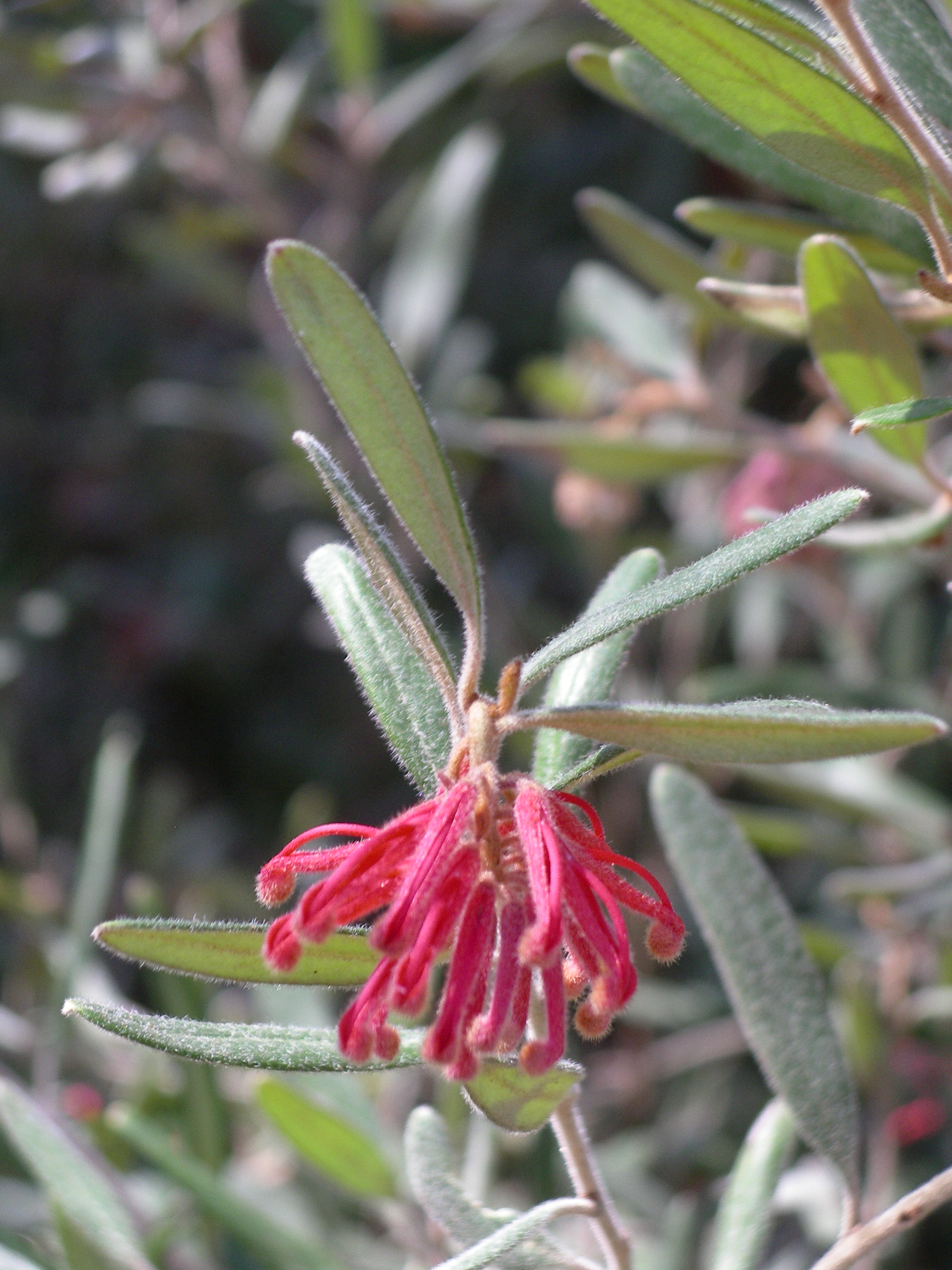
G. irrasa subsp. didymochiton

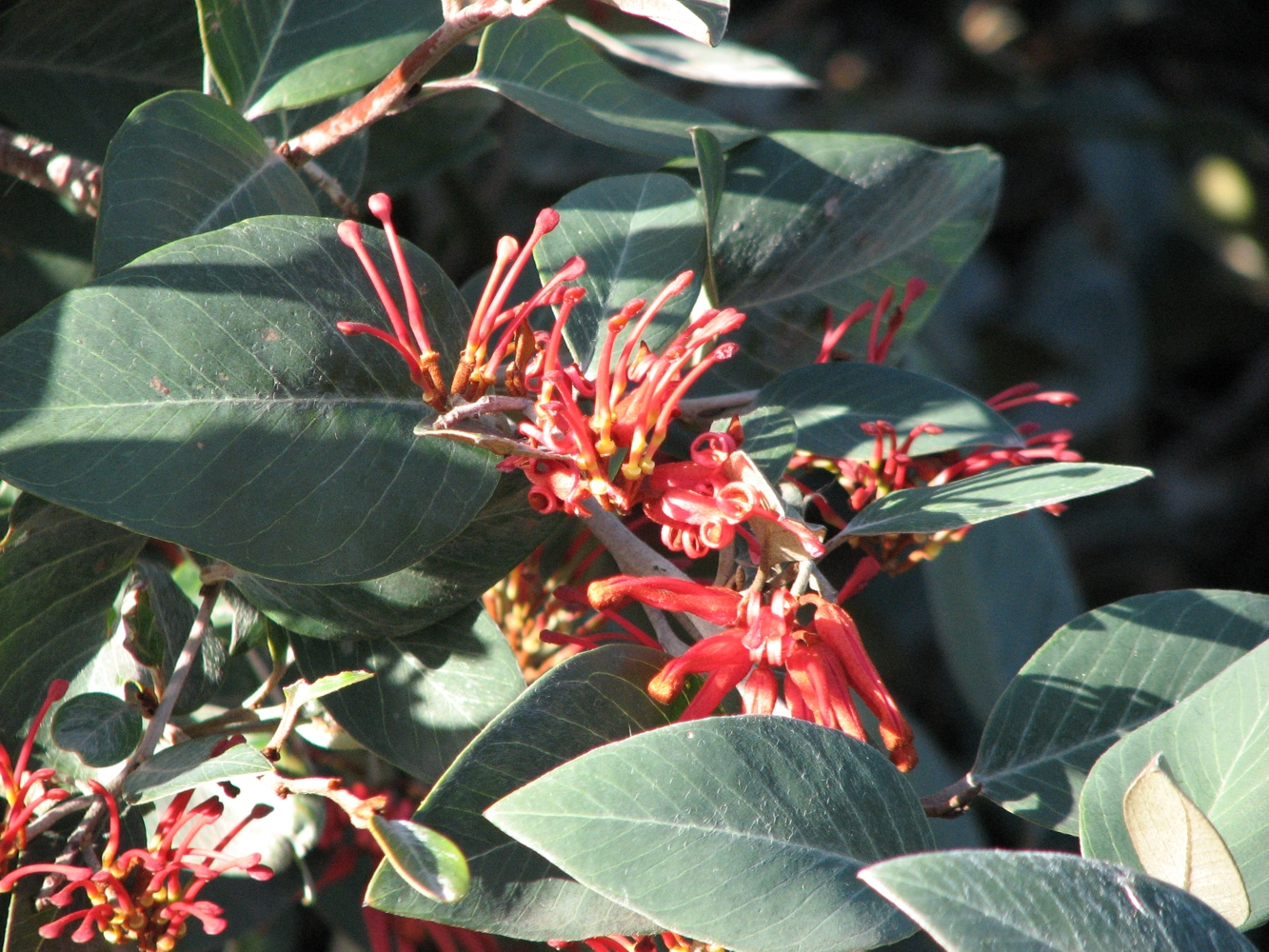
G. sp. 'Mt Burrowa'

In 1993 Don McGillivray published an outline of 11 races of Grevillea victoriae as well as an associated description of unassigned specimens prompting fellow botanists to take a closer look at the Grevillea victoriae complex. The following year, Grevillea hockingsii from Queensland and G. mollis from New South Wales were segregated from the Grevillea victoriae complex by Peter Olde and Bill Molyneux. Bob Makinson segregated two further species, G. oxyantha and G. rhyolitica, in 1997. Grevillea epicroca, G. irassa and G. monscalana were segregated and G. miqueliana was reinstated as a separate species in the Flora of Australia in 2000. In this publication, Makinson defined a Victoriae Subgroup within the genus Grevillea as follows:

Flora of Australia (2000)	McGillivray (1993)	Olde & Marriott (1995)	Other synonyms
Grevillea victoriae	G. victoriae	G. victoriae	
G. victoriae subsp. victoriae	G. victoriae 'race c'		
G. victoriae subsp. nivalis	G. victoriae 'race d'		G. victoriae 'Murray (Valley) Queen'
Grevillea brevifolia	G. victoriae 'Unassigned 3', G. victoriae 'Unassigned 6'		
G. brevifolia subsp. brevifolia	G. victoriae 'race e'		
G. brevifolia subsp. polychroma	G. victoriae 'race f' (partially)		G. brevifolia subsp. 2 (Mt Elizabeth)
Grevillea parvula	G victoriae 'race f' (partially)		G. victoriae var. leptoneura, G victoriae var. tenuinervis, G. sp. 3 subsp. 2 (Mt Kaye), G. victoriae 'Mallacoota Inlet' (partially)
Grevillea epicroca	G. victoriae 'Unassigned 5'		
Grevillea monslacana	G. victoriae 'race h'	G. victoriae 'Lake Mountain form'	G. sp. 2 (Lake Mountain)
Grevillea miqueliana		G. miqueliana	
G. miqueliana subsp. miqueliana	G. victoriae 'race j'	G. miqueliana 'Typical form'	
G. miqueliana subsp. moroka	G. victoriae 'race k'	G. miqueliana 'Mt Wellington form'	
Grevillea irrasa	G. victoriae 'race l'	G. sp. aff. miqueliana	
G. irrasa subsp. irrasa		G. sp. nov. aff. miqueliana 'Form from near Yowaka'	G. sp. 'Nullica'
G. irrasa subsp. didymochiton		G. sp. nov. aff. miqueliana 'Form from near Yowrie'	G. sp. 'Belowra'
Grevillea oxyantha		G. sp. aff. victoriae 'A'	
G. oxyantha subsp. oxyantha	G. victoriae 'race a'		G. victoriae 'Canberra form', G. victoriae 'ACT form'
G. oxyantha subsp. ecarinata	G. victoriae 'race b'		
Grevillea rhyolitica		G. sp. aff. victoriae 'B'	
G. rhyolitica subsp. rhyolitica			
G. rhyolitica subsp. semivestita	G. victoriae 'race g'		
Grevillea diminuta	G. diminuta	G. diminuta	
Grevillea hockingsii	G. victoriae 'Unassigned 8' (Queensland)	G. hockingsii	
Grevillea linsmithii	G. linsmithii	G. linsmithii	
Grevillea mollis		G. mollis	G.thymafolia
Grevillea cyranostigma	G. cyranostigma	G. cyranostigma	

In 2005 Bill Molyneux and Val Stajsic described the new species Grevillea bemboka and G. callichlaena and the new subspecies G. miqueliana subsp. cincta and elevated G. brevifolia subsp. polychroma to species status (G. polychroma). A new species, Grevillea burrowa, was formally described in 2015.

=== Grevillea victoriae sensu stricto ===
There are currently three recognised subspecies in Grevillea victoriae sensu stricto:

- G. victoriae subsp. brindabella – newly described in 2010. (synonyms: G. aff. victoriae 'Baldy Range', G. aff. victoriae M.Richardson 9)
- G. victoriae subsp. nivalis – Kosciuszko grevillea, which was formally described in 2000 by Stajsic and Molyneux in Taxonomic studies in the Grevillea victoriae F.Muell. species complex.
- G. victoriae subsp. victoriae

== Distribution and habitat ==
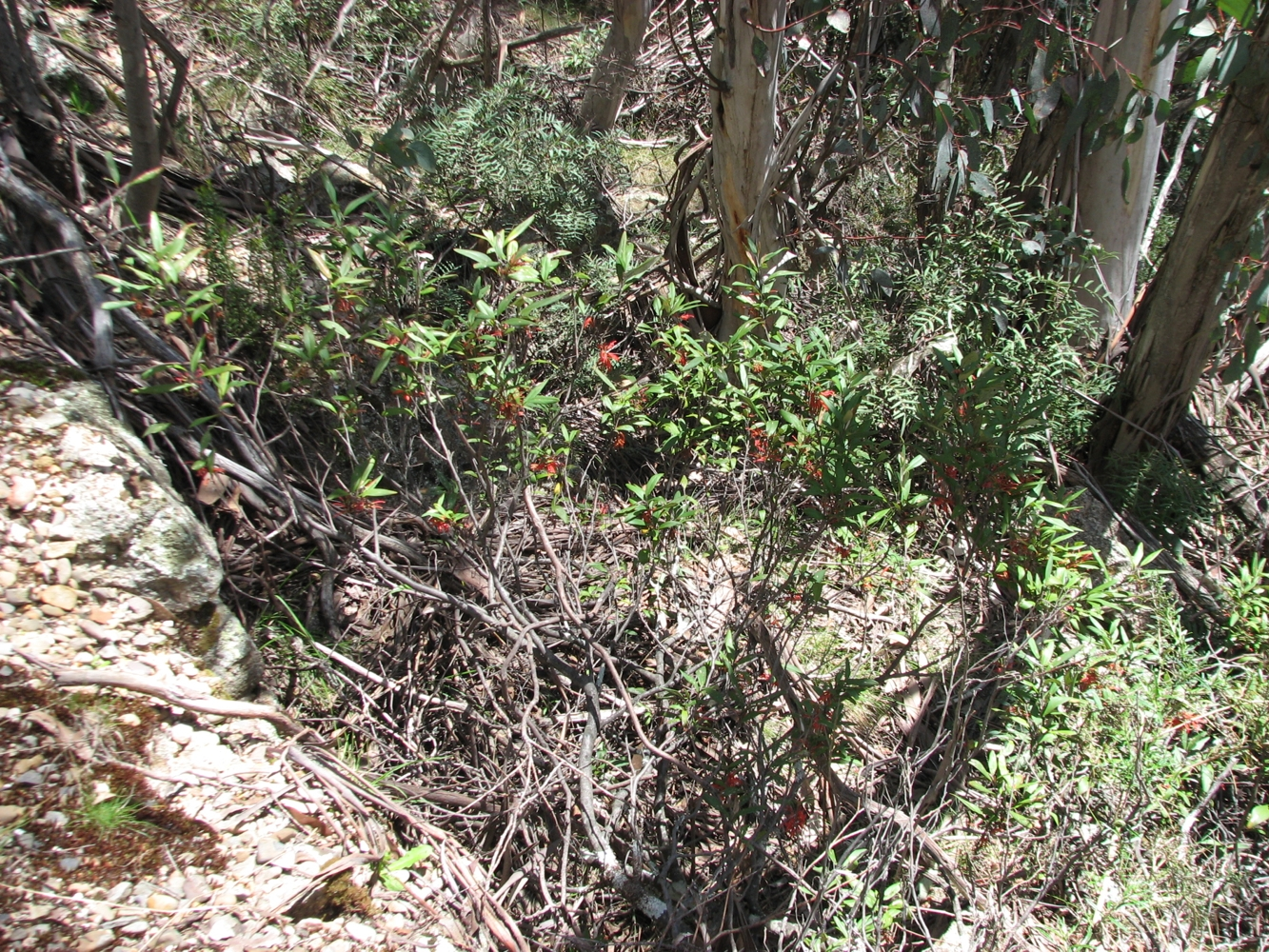
G. victoriae subsp. victoriae in rocky gorge habitat in Mount Buffalo National Park, Victoria

Grevillea victoriae occurs in rocky, mountainous areas of south-eastern Australia in forest, woodland and heath. Associated tree species include Eucalyptus pauciflora and Eucalyptus delegatensis. G. victoriae subsp. victoriae is found on some of Victoria's highest mountains including Mount Bogong, Mount Buffalo, Mount Buller, Mount Hotham, Mount Howitt, Mount St Bernard and Mount Torbreck. G. victoriae subsp. nivalis occurs in sub-alpine areas around Mount Kosciuszko and nearby ranges from Mount Gibbo and Mount Sassafras in the Victorian Alps northwards to Talbingo in New South Wales. In rare cases it may be seen above the treeline. G. victoriae subsp. brindabella occurs in the Brindabella Range on the border of New South Wales and the Australian Capital Territory.

== Ecology ==
Eastern spinebills and yellow-faced honeyeaters are known to feed on the nectar of Grevillea victoriae sensu lato. In Kosciuszko National Park, it has been noted that many bird species leave the area when Grevillea victoriae finishes flowering in January

Taxa within the Grevillea victoriae complex are believed to be fire intolerant, regenerating from seed only.

== Conservation status ==
Subspecies victoriae and nivalis are listed as "endangered" under the Victorian Government Flora and Fauna Guarantee Act 1988.

== Use in horticulture ==
Grevillea victoriae has a reputation for being hardy and reliable in cultivation, and has been successfully grown in all states of Australia, as well as New Zealand, the United States and Great Britain. Plants require a well-drained position with full-exposure to sun or partial shade and will benefit from pruning to maintain a more compact shape. Originating from mountainous regions, the species has a high tolerance to frost and snow. It is useful as a screening plant and to attract birds to the garden. In certain parts of North America, hummingbirds feed on the flowers of cultivated plants in the winter.

Plants are easily propagated by seed or cuttings and have been successfully grafted on to Grevillea robusta rootstocks.

=== Cultivars ===
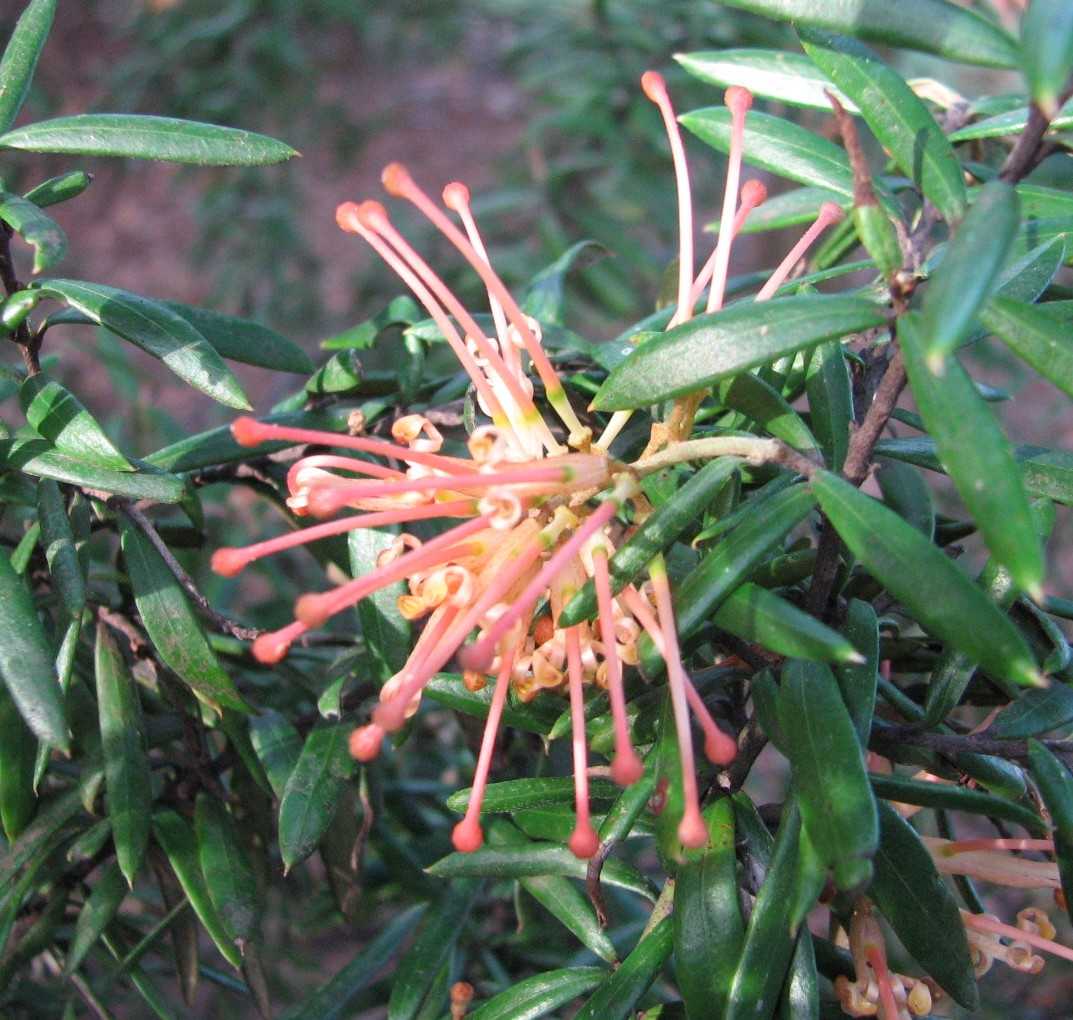
Grevillea 'Poorinda Queen'

A number of hybrid cultivars involving Grevillea victoriae sensu lato have been developed including the following:

- 'Audrey' – G. juniperina x G. victoriae
- 'Bairnsdale' – selected seedling of G. 'Poorinda Constance'
- 'Canterbury Gold' – G. juniperina (prostrate yellow form) x G. victoriae var.leptoneura
- 'Glen Pearl' – G. victoriae x G. juniperina
- 'Lady O' – G. victoriae hybrid x G. rhyolitica
- 'Orange Box' – G. polychroma x G. juniperina subsp. juniperina
- 'Poorinda Constance' – New South Wales form of G. juniperina x red flower form of G. victoriae
- 'Poorinda Golden Lyre' – G. alpina x G. victoriae
- 'Poorinda Leane' – G. juniperina x G. victoriae
- 'Poorinda Pink Coral' – north-east Victorian form of G. juniperina x G. victoriae
- 'Poorinda Queen' – G. juniperina x yellow flower form of Grevillea victoriae
