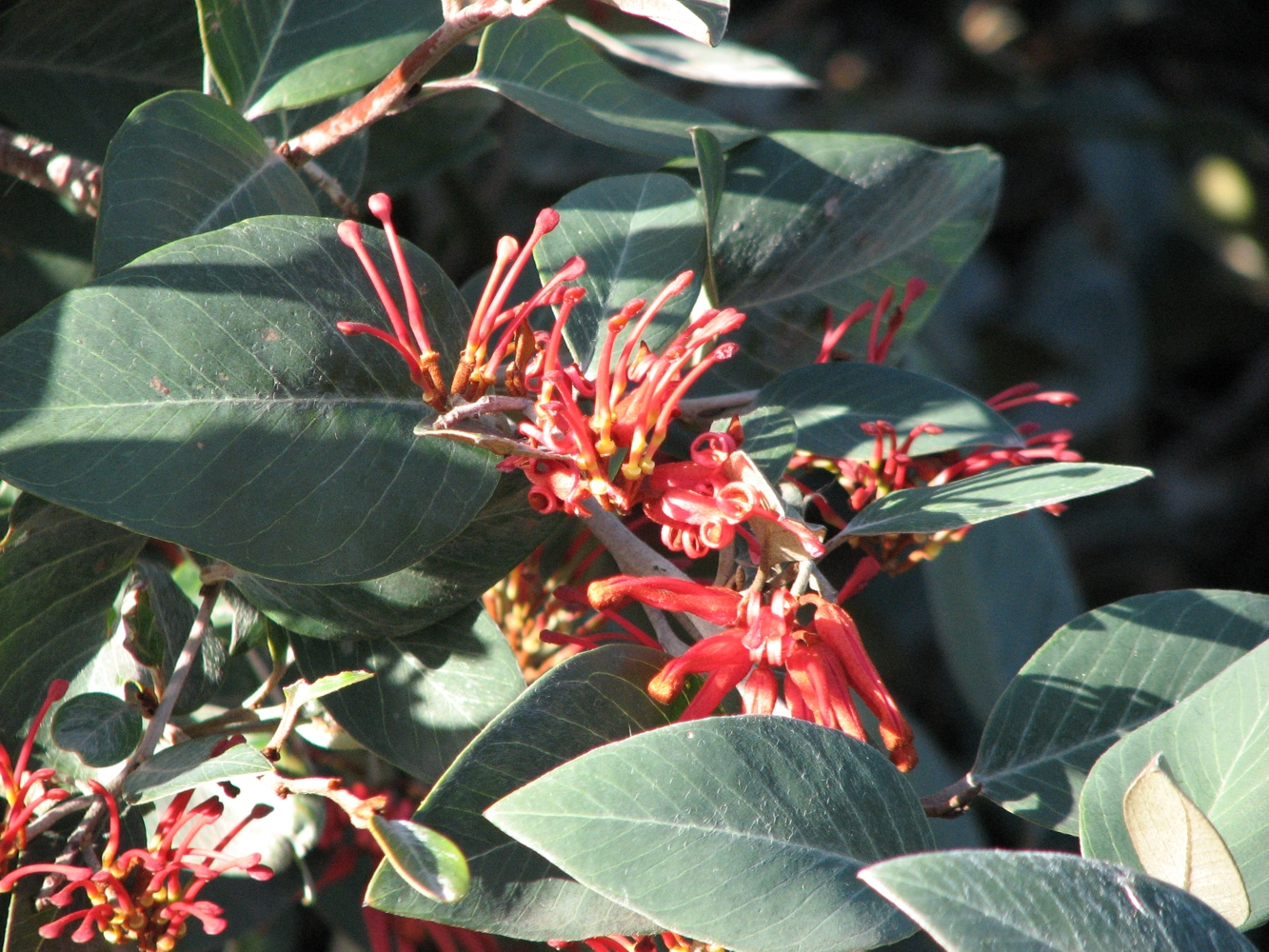
- Grevillea burrowa in Royal Botanic Gardens Melbourne

Scientific classification
- Kingdom: Plantae
- Clade: Embryophytes
- Clade: Tracheophytes
- Clade: Spermatophytes
- Clade: Angiosperms
- Clade: Eudicots
- Order: Proteales
- Family: Proteaceae
- Genus: Grevillea
- Species: G. burrowa

Binomial name
- Grevillea burrowa Molyneux & Forrester

Synonyms
- Grevillea sp. aff. oxyantha (Mt Burrowa); Grevillea sp. Mt Burrowa

= Grevillea burrowa =

Burrowa grevillea

Species of shrub endemic to Victoria, Australia

Grevillea burrowa, commonly known as Burrowa grevillea, is a species of flowering plant in the family Proteaceae and is endemic to a restricted area of Victoria, Australia. It is a spreading shrub with oblong to egg-shaped leaves, and clusters of reddish-pink flowers.

== Description ==
Grevillea burrowa is a spreading shrub that typically grows to 1.5–4 m (4 ft 11 in – 13 ft 1 in) high and 2–4 m (6 ft 7 in – 13 ft 1 in) wide, its branchlets densely silky-hairy. The leaves are oblong to egg-shaped, mostly 65–80 mm (2.6–3.1 in) long and 25–35 mm (0.98–1.38 in) wide, the edges curved downwards, the upper surface glabrous and the lower surface densely covered with silky white hairs. The flowers, including the style, are pinkish-red and arranged in clusters in leaf axils and at the ends of stems, on a rachis 12–20 mm (0.47–0.79 in) long, the pistil 20–24 mm (0.79–0.94 in) long. Flowering occurs from late August to January and the fruit is a more or less glabrous, narrow oval follicle 18–20 mm (0.71–0.79 in) long.

== Taxonomy ==
Grevillea burrowa was first formally described in 2015 by William Mitchell Molyneux and Susan G. Forrester in the journal Muelleria from specimens collected in the Burrowa-Pine Mountain National Park in 2002. The taxon had been listed in the 7th edition of the Census of the Vascular Plants of Victoria in 2003 as Grevillea sp. aff. oxyantha (Mt Burrowa). The specific epithet (burrowa) refers to the type location on Mount Burrowa and to the Burrowa-Pine Mountain National Park where the species is apparently endemic. The name "Burrowa" in turn may be the word for white-breasted sea eagle in the Pallanganmiddang language.

== Distribution and habitat ==
Burrowa grevillea grows in woodland in on rocky outcrops in shrubland in montane areas in the Burrowa-Pine Mountain National Park in Victoria, near the New South Wales border, where it is known from two populations about 3 km (1.9 mi) apart.

== Conservation status ==
The species is listed as critically endangered in Victoria under the Flora and Fauna Guarantee Act 1988 and as vulnerable in the Department of Environment and Primary Industries' Advisory List of Rare Or Threatened Plants In Victoria.
