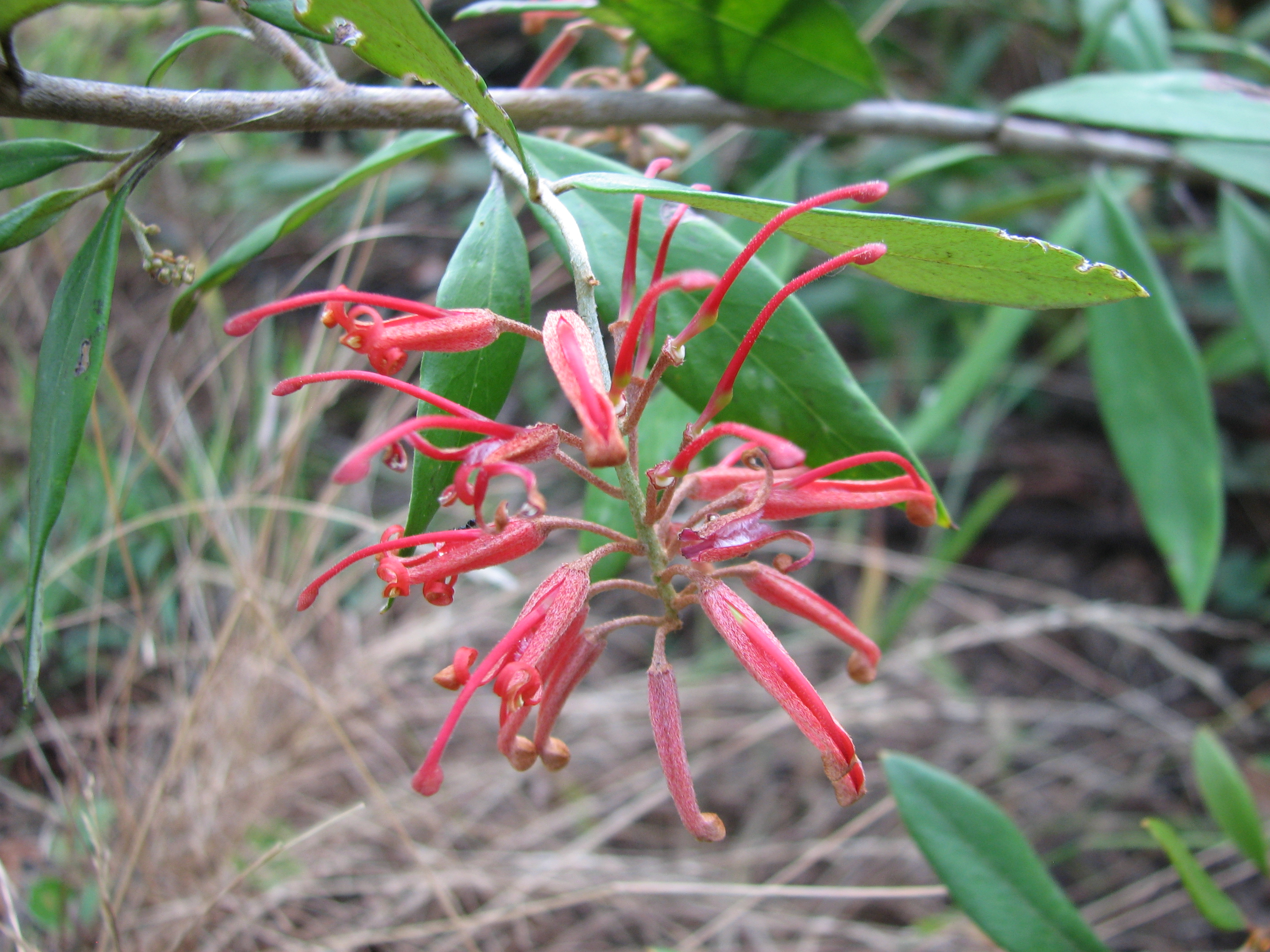
- In the Royal Botanic Gardens, Melbourne

Scientific classification
- Kingdom: Plantae
- Clade: Tracheophytes
- Clade: Angiosperms
- Clade: Eudicots
- Order: Proteales
- Family: Proteaceae
- Genus: Grevillea
- Species: G. callichlaena

Binomial name
- Grevillea callichlaena Molyneux & Stajsic

Synonyms
- Grevillea sp. aff. miqueliana (Mt Benambra)

= Grevillea callichlaena =

Species of shrub endemic to Victoria, Australia

Grevillea callichlaena, commonly known as Mt. Benambra grevillea, is a species of flowering plant in the family Proteaceae and is endemic to a restricted part of Victoria in Australia. It is a spreading shrub with elliptic, egg-shaped or broadly lance-shaped leaves, and uniformly red flowers.

== Description ==
Grevillea callichlaena is a spreading shrub that typically grows to 1.5–1.8 m (4 ft 11 in – 5 ft 11 in) high and 2–3 m (7–10 ft) wide and has densely silky-hairy branchlets. Its leaves are elliptic, egg-shaped or lance-shaped, sometimes broadly so, sometimes with the narrower end towards the base, mostly 37–75 mm (1.5–3.0 in) long and 19–28 mm (0.75–1.10 in) wide with the edges turned down. The lower surface of the leaves is silky-hairy and the veins are conspicuous. The flowers are arranged in pendulous groups of twenty to forty on the ends of branchlets on a rachis 35–50 mm (1.4–2.0 in) long, and are uniformly red and silky-hairy on the outside, the pistil 19.5–22 mm (0.77–0.87 in) long. Flowering occurs from October to March, but sometimes in other months, and the fruit is a more or less glabrous follicle 13–18 mm (0.51–0.71 in) long.

== Taxonomy ==
Grevillea callichlaena was first formally described in 2005 by Bill Molyneux and Val Stajsic in the journal Muelleria from specimens collected from Mount Benambra in the Alpine National Park in 2002. The specific epithet (callichlaena) means "beauty-cloak", referring to the hairs covering the flowers.

== Distribution and habitat ==
Mt. Benambra grevillea grows in woodland, often between scattered granite boulders, in two isolated populations on Mount Benambra in north-eastern Victoria.

== Conservation status ==
The species is listed as critically endangered on the Flora and Fauna Guarantee Act 1988 Threatened List.
