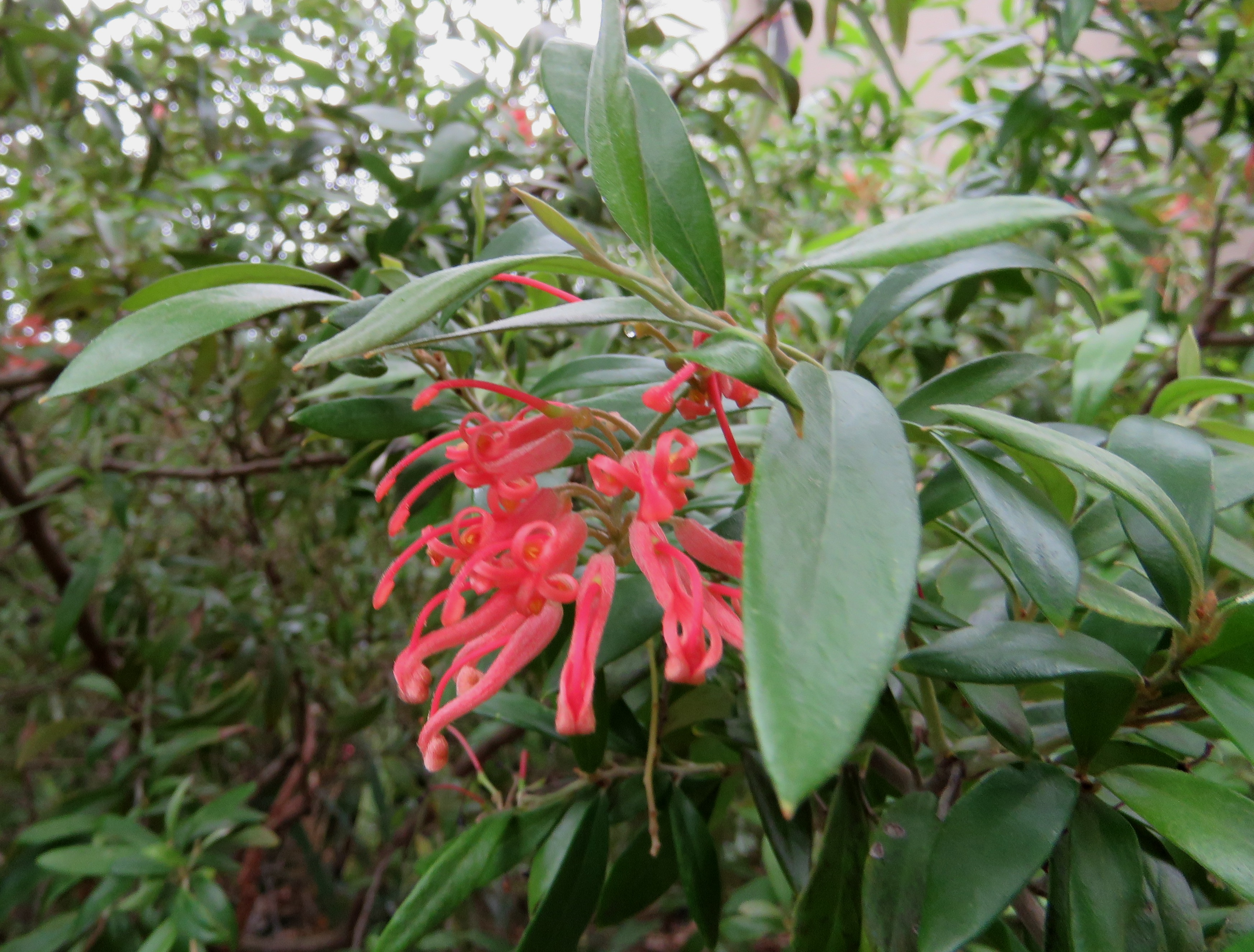
- In Royal Botanic Gardens Melbourne

Conservation status
- Vulnerable (IUCN 3.1)

Scientific classification
- Kingdom: Plantae
- Clade: Embryophytes
- Clade: Tracheophytes
- Clade: Spermatophytes
- Clade: Angiosperms
- Clade: Eudicots
- Order: Proteales
- Family: Proteaceae
- Genus: Grevillea
- Species: G. bemboka

Binomial name
- Grevillea bemboka Stajsic & Molyneux

Synonyms
- Grevillea aff. victoriae (Bemboka); Grevillea aff. parvula (Bemboka); Grevillea sp. Bemboka (Telford 11565) NSW Herbarium

= Grevillea bemboka =

Species of shrub endemic to Australia

Grevillea bemboka is a species of flowering plant in the family Proteaceae and is endemic to a restricted area of far south-eastern New South Wales. It is a spreading to erect shrub with hairy branchlets, egg-shaped to elliptic leaves and red or reddish-pink flowers.

== Description ==
Grevillea bemboka is a spreading to erect shrub that typically grows up to 4 m (13 ft) high and 7 m (23 ft) wide and has hairy branchlets. Its leaves are egg-shaped to elliptic, mostly 35–60 mm (1.4–2.4 in) long and 10–20 mm (0.39–0.79 in) wide, the upper surface more or less glabrous and the lower surface covered with silky or woolly hairs. The flowers are arranged in cylindrical or dome-shaped clusters of 16 to 28 in leaf axils or on the ends of branches, each flower on a hairy peduncle 5–20 mm (0.20–0.79 in) long, the rachis 10–31 mm (0.39–1.22 in) long. The flowers are apricot-coloured in the bud stage, later red or reddish pink, the pistil 18–20.5 mm (0.71–0.81 in) long. Flowering mainly occurs from August to March and the fruit is a glabrous follicle 20–23 mm (0.79–0.91 in) long.

== Taxonomy ==
Grevillea bemboka was first formally described in 2005 by Val Stajsic and Bill Molyneux in the journal Muelleria from specimens collected in the Bemboka State Forest in 1992. The specific epithet (bemboka) is a reference to the Bemboka section of the South East Forests National Park and is itself a corruption of the Aboriginal name bumbooke, meaning "moon rising in the sky".

== Distribution and habitat ==
This grevillea is only known from four to six sites in the Bemboka section of the South East Forests National Park, where it grows in forest.

== Conservation status ==
Grevillea bemboka is currently listed as vulnerable on the IUCN Red List of Threatened Species as its population is assumed to be of less than 1000 mature individuals. Although there is little information on the threats to this species, it is subject to stochastic events such as fires that have the potential to affect its subpopulations.
