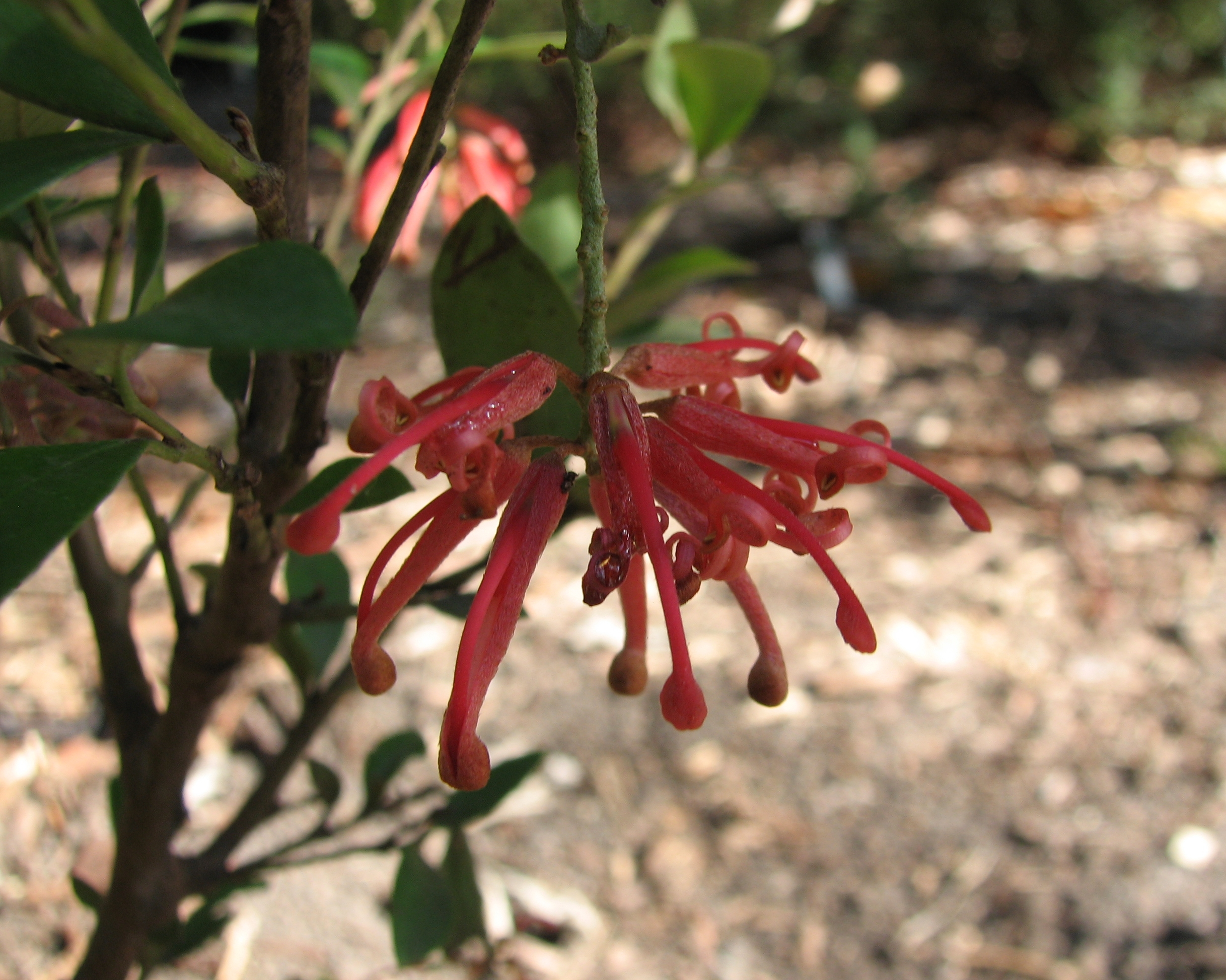
- In the Royal Botanic Gardens Melbourne

Scientific classification
- Kingdom: Plantae
- Clade: Tracheophytes
- Clade: Angiosperms
- Clade: Eudicots
- Order: Proteales
- Family: Proteaceae
- Genus: Grevillea
- Species: G. polychroma

Binomial name
- Grevillea polychroma (Molyneux & Stajsic) Molyneux & Stajsic

Synonyms
- Grevillea brevifolia subsp. 2 (Mt Elizabeth); Grevillea brevifolia subsp. polychroma Molyneux & Stajsic; Grevillea victoriae 'race f (Victorian populations)'; Grevillea victoriae 'race f' p.p.

= Grevillea polychroma =

Species of shrub endemic to Victoria, Australia

Grevillea polychroma , commonly known as Tullach Ard grevillea, is a species of flowering plant in the family Proteaceae and is endemic to eastern Victoria. It is a spreading to erect shrub with densely hairy branchlets, egg-shaped leaves, the narrower end towards the base, and down-turned clusters of hairy, cream-coloured, pale yellow or pink to red flowers.

== Description ==
Grevillea polychroma is a spreading to erect shrub that typically grows to 1–3 m (3 ft 3 in – 9 ft 10 in) high, 1–5 m (3 ft 3 in – 16 ft 5 in) wide and has densely hairy branchlets. Its leaves are usually egg-shaped with the narrower end towards the base, sometimes elliptic, mostly 25–50 mm (0.98–1.97 in) long and 33–70 mm (1.3–2.8 in) wide. The upper surface of the leaves is glossy and glabrous, the lower surface densely hairy. The flowers are arranged on the ends of branches on down-turned, sometimes branched clusters, on a rachis 14–20 mm (0.55–0.79 in) long. The flowers are hairy, cream-coloured, pale yellow or pink to red, the pistil 19–21.5 mm (0.75–0.85 in) long. Flowering mainly occurs from July to March and the fruit is a glabrous follicle 18–23 mm (0.71–0.91 in) long.

== Taxonomy ==
This grevillea was first formally described in 2000 by Bill Molyneux and Val Stajsic, who gave it the name Grevillea brevifolia subsp. polychroma in the Flora of Australia. In 2006, the same authors raised the subspecies to species status as Grevillea polychroma in the journal Muelleria. The specific epithet (polychroma) means "many colours", referring to the variable flower colour of this species.

== Distribution and habitat ==
Grevillea polychroma grows in forest at altitudes ranging from 80 to 940 m (260 to 3,080 ft) and is mainly found in areas around Buchan and Gelantipy in eastern Gippsland in Victoria.

== Conservation status ==
The species is listed as "endangered" under the Victorian Government Flora and Fauna Guarantee Act 1988 and as "Rare in Victoria" on the Department of Sustainability and Environment's Advisory List of Rare or Threatened Plants in Victoria.
