= Caladenia cremna =

Don's spider orchid

Conservation status
- Critically endangered (EPBC Act)

Scientific classification
- Kingdom: Plantae
- Clade: Tracheophytes
- Clade: Angiosperms
- Clade: Monocots
- Order: Asparagales
- Family: Orchidaceae
- Subfamily: Orchidoideae
- Tribe: Diurideae
- Genus: Caladenia
- Species: C. cremna

Binomial name
- Caladenia cremna (D.L.Jones) G.N.Backh.

Synonyms
- Arachnorchis cremna D.L.Jones

Species of orchid

Caladenia cremna, commonly known as Don's spider orchid, is a plant in the orchid family Orchidaceae and is endemic to a small area in Victoria. It is a rare ground orchid with a single hairy leaf and a single yellow flower with red striations.

== Description ==
Caladenia cremna is a terrestrial, perennial, deciduous, herb with an underground tuber. It has a single, dull green, hairy leaf, 8–10 cm (3–4 in) long and 4–8 mm (0.2–0.3 in) wide with purple blotches at the base.

A single yellow flower 4–5 cm (1.6–2.0 in) in diameter and with fine red striations is borne on a spike 15–20 cm (6–8 in) tall. The petals and sepals are 2.5–4.5 cm (1–2 in) long. The dorsal sepal is erect, 2–3 mm (0.08–0.1 in) wide at the base and tapers to a thread-like end with a dark, purple-red glandular tip 4–6 mm (0.16–0.24 in) long. The lateral sepals are 4–6 mm (0.16–0.24 in) wide at the base and taper to a thread-like end with a tip like that on the dorsal sepal, although shorter. The petals are 2–3 mm (0.08–0.1 in) wide, slightly shorter than the sepals and lack the glandular tip. The petals and sepals spread widely apart and have drooping tips. The labellum is lance-shaped to egg-shaped, 15–17 mm (0.6–0.7 in) long and 9–10 mm (0.35–0.39 in) wide when flattened and curves downward at the tip. It is mostly yellowish with a dark reddish tip. Red teeth on the margins are about 1 mm (0.04 in) long but decreasing in size towards the front. There are four to six rows of well-spaced, foot-shaped calli along the centre of the labellum, decreasing in size towards the front. Flowering occurs in October.

== Taxonomy and naming ==
This species was first formally described by David L. Jones in 2006 and given the name Arachnorchis cremna. The description was published in Australian Orchid Research, based on a specimen found near Whitfield. In 2007, Gary Backhouse changed the name to Caladenia cremna, publishing the name change in The Victorian Naturalist. Jones derived the specific epithet (cremna) from "the Greek cremnos, steep, in reference to the steep slope where this species occurs".

== Distribution and habitat ==
Don’s spider orchid grows in eucalypt forest, with an understorey of heath and Rytidosperma pallidum on steep slaty hillsides. It is only known from the area where the type specimen was found.

== Conservation ==
Between 18 and 35 plants have been counted in the area of occupation. The species is listed as "Endangered" under the Victorian Government Flora and Fauna Guarantee Act 1988 and as "Critically Endangered" under the Commonwealth Government Environment Protection and Biodiversity Conservation Act 1999 (EPBC) Act. The main threats to the species are activities associated with road use and maintenance and weed invasion.
