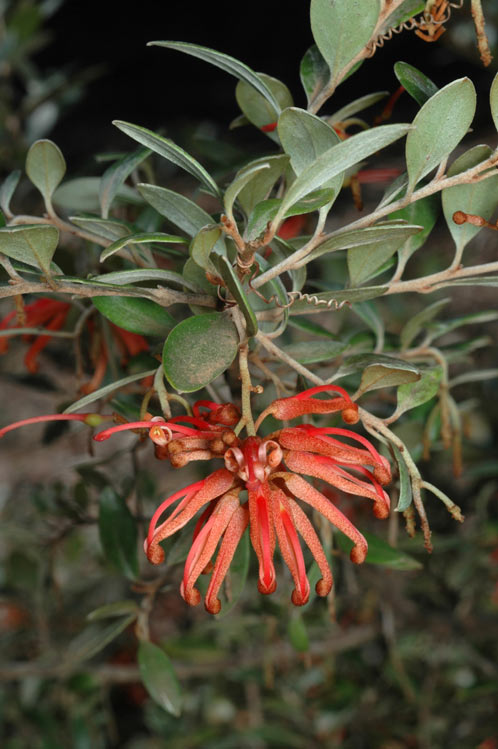
- Grevillea brevifolia in the Australian National Botanic Gardens

Conservation status
- Vulnerable (IUCN 3.1)

Scientific classification
- Kingdom: Plantae
- Clade: Embryophytes
- Clade: Tracheophytes
- Clade: Spermatophytes
- Clade: Angiosperms
- Clade: Eudicots
- Order: Proteales
- Family: Proteaceae
- Genus: Grevillea
- Species: G. brevifolia

Binomial name
- Grevillea brevifolia F.Muell. ex Benth.

Synonyms
- Grevillea victoriae var. brevifolia (F.Muell. ex Benth.) F.Muell. ex Maiden & Betche

= Grevillea brevifolia =

Cobberas grevillea

Species of plant native to Australia

Grevillea brevifolia, commonly known as Cobberas grevillea, is a species of flowering plant in the family Proteaceae and is endemic to south-eastern continental Australia. It is a spreading shrub with hairy branchlets, elliptic leaves and clusters of hairy red flowers.

== Description ==
Grevillea brevifolia is a spreading shrub, typically 0.5–2.5 m (1 ft 8 in – 8 ft 2 in) high and 2.0–3.5 m (6 ft 7 in – 11 ft 6 in) wide, its branchlets silky-hairy. Its leaves are usually elliptic, sometimes egg-shaped, mostly 21–38 mm (0.83–1.50 in) long and 6–16 mm (0.24–0.63 in) wide, the upper surface mostly glossy and glabrous, the lower surface densely silky-hairy. The flowers are arranged in pendulous clusters on the ends of branchlets with many flowers, the rachis usually 10–15 mm (0.39–0.59 in) long. The flowers are red and woolly-hairy on the outside, the pistil 17–22 mm (0.67–0.87 in) long. Flowering mainly occurs from late August to May and the fruit is a glabrous follicle 18–23 mm (0.71–0.91 in) long.

== Taxonomy ==
Grevillea brevifolia first formally described in 1870 by George Bentham in Flora Australiensis from an unpublished description by Victorian Government Botanist Ferdinand von Mueller who collected the type specimens from Mount Tambo in Victoria at an altitude of 5,000 ft (1,500 m). The specific epithet (brevifolia) means "short-leaved".

== Distribution and habitat ==
Cobberas grevillea grows in alpine and subalpine woodlands, often in rocky places in north-eastern Victoria and as far north as Mount Kosciuszko in New South Wales.

== Conservation status ==
This species is listed as vulnerable on the IUCN Red List of Threatened Species as it has a limited distribution, a naturally severely fragmented population and is vulnerable to stochastic factors such as potential fire events that can drastically affect the species by impacting several subpopulations at once. Increased fire regimes could threaten the long-term survival of some populations if the interval between burns does not allow seed regenerated plants to reach maturity. Other threats include potential clearing through roadworks and potential browsing by introduced Sambar deer. Grevillea brevifolia is listed as endangered in Victoria under the Flora and Fauna Guarantee Act 1988
