= Gibbo =

Gibbo may refer to:

== Fictional characters ==
- Gibbo, a character played by Jake Ryan in the 2023–24 Australian drama series Last King of the Cross
- Gibbo, a pilot in Australian drama series The Flying Doctors
- Gibbo, a character played by Kenneth Cranham in the 2000 British crime film Shiner

== People ==
=== Nickname ===
- Gibbo, producer on the 2022 album by English rapper Aitch Close to Home
- Lynda Gibson (1956–2004), an Australian comedian and actress known as "Gibbo"
- Mike Gibson (sports journalist) (1940–2015), an Australian sports journalist and broadcaster known as "Gibbo"

=== Surname ===
- John Gibbo (fl. 492–499), a.k.a. John the Hunchback, a general and a politician of the Eastern Roman Empire

== Geographic features ==
- Gibbo River, a river in the Alpine and East Gippsland regions of Victoria, Australia
- Mount Gibbo, a mountain in the Australian Alps

== Other uses ==
- Gibbo Stadium, a sports stadium in Zimbabwe used by the Triangle United Football Club

== See also ==
- Golden Gibbo, a comedy award given at the Melbourne International Comedy Festival, named after Lynda "Gibbo" Gibson
