= Hakea asperma =

Native Dog Hakea

Scientific classification
- Kingdom: Plantae
- Clade: Tracheophytes
- Clade: Angiosperms
- Clade: Eudicots
- Order: Proteales
- Family: Proteaceae
- Genus: Hakea
- Species: H. asperma

Binomial name
- Hakea asperma Molyneux & Forrester

Species of plant endemic to Victoria, Australia

Hakea asperma, commonly known as the native dog hakea, is an endangered shrub in the family Proteaceae endemic to a small area in northeastern Victoria. It is an unusual species that has no fruit and only reproduces by suckering.

== Description ==
Hakea asperma is an erect suckering shrub that can grow to 1.3 metres (4.3 ft) in height. It has erect stems and smooth, smaller branches. The rigid grey-green needle-like leaves are 2 to 10 centimetres (0.8 to 3.9 in) long and 0.8 to 1.3 millimetres (0.031 to 0.051 in) wide ending in a sharp point. New leaves have white silky hairs becoming rusty coloured toward the apex. It flowers in late spring to early summer around November and produces an inflorescence containing 6 to 10 white flowers. This species does not produce fruit and only reproduces asexually by root suckering.

== Taxonomy ==
Hakea asperma species was first formally described by botanists William Molyneux and Susan G. Forrester in 2009 in the journal Muelleria.

== Distribution and habitat ==
Hakea asperma is endemic to the Native Dog Flat area north of Native Dog Falls of the Upper Buchan River district in East Gippsland Victoria where it is presently known from a single population. Hakea asperma grows in mallee communities on the lower slopes of small steep hills in shallow rocky soils in between rocks to support its roots.

== Conservation status ==
Hakea asperma is classified as "critically endangered" by the Government of Victoria Environment Protection Amendment Act 2018 due to its exceedingly small population size of only a few plants which makes the species highly susceptible to extinction by fire or other unknown occurrences.
