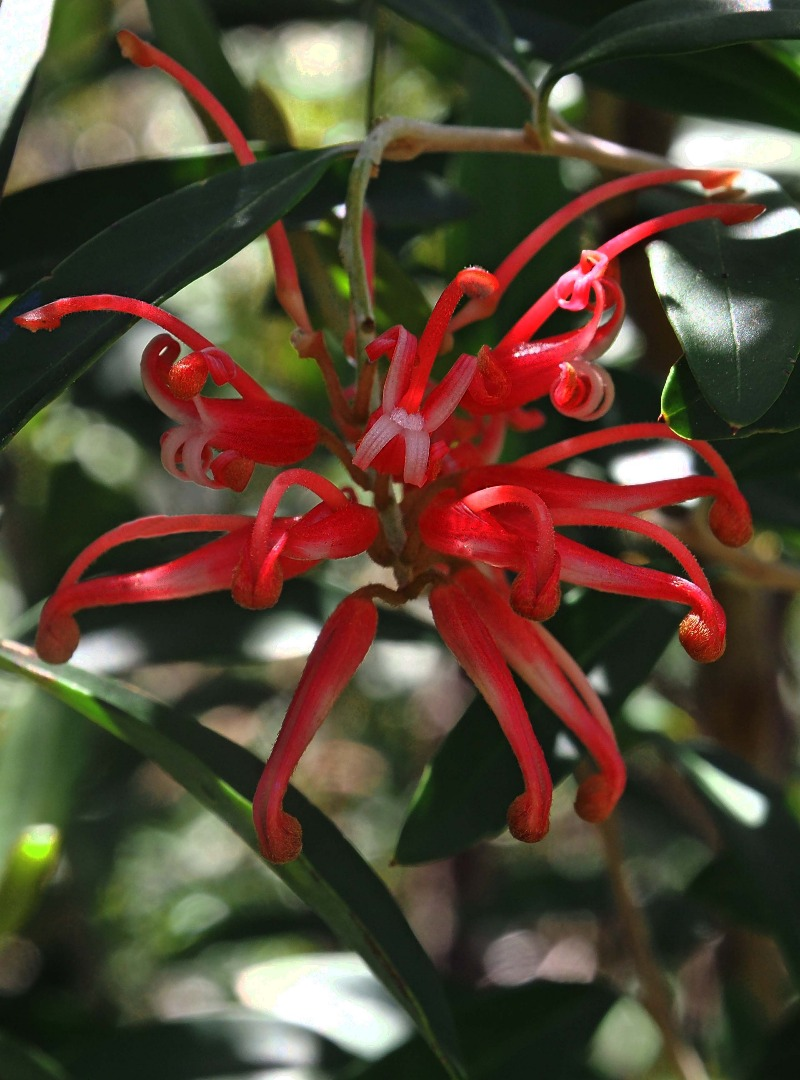
- At Lake Mountain

Scientific classification
- Kingdom: Plantae
- Clade: Tracheophytes
- Clade: Angiosperms
- Clade: Eudicots
- Order: Proteales
- Family: Proteaceae
- Genus: Grevillea
- Species: G. monslacana

Binomial name
- Grevillea monslacana Molyneux & Stajsic

Synonyms
- Grevillea victoriae 'race h'; Grevillea victoriae 'Lake Mountain form'; Grevillea sp. 2 (Lake Mountain)

= Grevillea monslacana =

Species of shrub endemic to Victoria, Australia

Grevillea monslacana, commonly known as Lake Mountain grevillea, is a species of flowering plant in the family Proteaceae and is endemic to mountainous areas of eastern Victoria in Australia. It is a spreading to erect shrub with narrowly egg-shaped leaves and clusters of pink to reddish pink flowers.

== Description ==
Grevillea monslacana is an erect to spreading shrub that typically grows to 1.5–3.5 m (4 ft 11 in – 11 ft 6 in) high, 1.5–3 m (4 ft 11 in – 9 ft 10 in) wide and has densely woolly-hairy branchlets. Its leaves are narrowly egg-shaped with the narrower end towards the base, sometimes narrowly elliptic, mostly 30–70 mm (1.2–2.8 in) long and 8–15 mm (0.31–0.59 in) wide. The upper surface of the leaves is usually glabrous, the lower surface silky-hairy, and the edges curved downwards. The flowers are arranged in sometimes branched clusters on a rachis 15–30 mm (0.59–1.18 in) long and are pink to reddish-pink, rarely white, the pistil 18–23 mm (0.71–0.91 in) long. Flowering occurs from October to April and the fruit is a faintly ridged follicle about 18 mm (0.71 in) long.

== Taxonomy ==
Grevillea monslacana was first formally described in 2000 by Val Stajsic and Bill Molyneux in the Flora of Australia from specimens collected in the Rubicon State Forest in 1995.

== Distribution and habitat ==
Lake Mountain grevillea grows in wet forest and open woodland at altitudes between 1,100 and 1,400 m (3,600 and 4,600 ft) and occurs in the area north and north-east of Marysville.

== Conservation status ==
Grevillea monslacana is listed as critically endangered in Victoria under the Flora and Fauna Guarantee Act 1988 and is listed as rare in Victoria on the Victorian Department of Sustainability and Environment's Advisory List of Rare Or Threatened Plants In Victoria.
