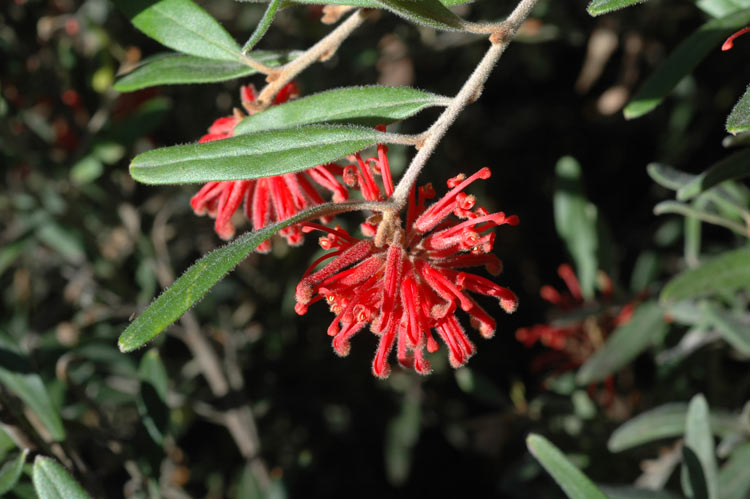
- Subspecies didymochiton in the Australian National Botanic Gardens

Conservation status
- Endangered (IUCN 3.1)

Scientific classification
- Kingdom: Plantae
- Clade: Embryophytes
- Clade: Tracheophytes
- Clade: Angiosperms
- Clade: Eudicots
- Order: Proteales
- Family: Proteaceae
- Genus: Grevillea
- Species: G. irrasa

Binomial name
- Grevillea irrasa Makinson

Synonyms
- Grevillea sp. aff. miqueliana; Grevillea victoriae 'race 1'

= Grevillea irrasa =

Species of shrub endemic to New South Wales, Australia

Grevillea irrasa is a species of flowering plant in the family Proteaceae and is endemic to south-eastern New South Wales. It is an erect, spreading shrub with oblong to egg-shaped leaves with the narrower end towards the base, and clusters of red to apricot-coloured flowers.

== Description ==
Grevillea irrasa is an erect, spreading shrub that typically grows to a height of 1.5–3 m (4 ft 11 in – 9 ft 10 in) and has hairy branchlets. Its leaves are oblong to egg-shaped with the narrower end towards the base, 30–60 mm (1.2–2.4 in) long and 5–22 mm (0.20–0.87 in) wide, the edges rolled under and the lower surface with felty or shaggy hairs. The flowers are usually arranged on the ends of branches in clusters of six to sixteen on a rachis 8–20 mm (0.31–0.79 in) long and are red to apricot-coloured, the pistil 14–17 mm (0.55–0.67 in) long. Flowering occurs from August to January and the fruit is a glabrous oval to elliptic follicle 15–18 mm (0.59–0.71 in) long.

== Taxonomy ==
Grevillea irrasa was first formally described in 2000 by Australian botanist Robert Owen Makinson in the Flora of Australia from specimens collected in the Nullica State Forest in 1997. The specific epithet (irrasa) means "unpolished" or "unshaven" and refers to the surface of the leaves, branchlets and flowers.

In the same publication, Makinson described two subspecies of G. irrasa and the names are accepted by the Australian Plant Census:

- Grevillea irrasa subsp. didymochiton Makinson has leaves that are egg-shaped or lance-shaped with the narrower end towards the base, or elliptic or oblong, and five to seven times as long as broad;
- Grevillea irrasa subsp. irrasa Makinson has leaves that are narrowly oblong to lance-shaped with the narrower end towards the base, and five to ten times as long as broad.

== Distribution and habitat ==
Grevillea irrasa occurs in dry sclerophyll forest inland from Pambula and Moruya in the south-east of New South Wales. Subspecies didymochiton is found inland from Moruya in the catchment of the Tuross River and subsp. irrasa inland from Pambula in the catchments of the Yowaka and Nullica Rivers, the distributions of the two subspecies separated by about 80 km (50 mi).

== Conservation status ==
Grevillea irrasa is listed as 'Endangered' in the IUCN Red List.
