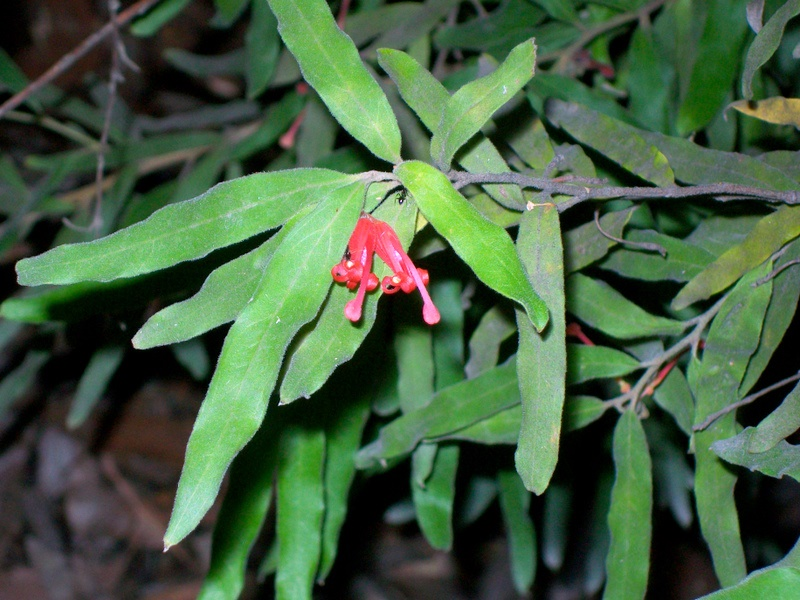

Conservation status
- Vulnerable (IUCN 3.1)

- Endangered (EPBC Act)

Scientific classification
- Kingdom: Plantae
- Clade: Tracheophytes
- Clade: Angiosperms
- Clade: Eudicots
- Order: Proteales
- Family: Proteaceae
- Genus: Grevillea
- Species: G. mollis

Binomial name
- Grevillea mollis Olde & Molyneux

= Grevillea mollis =

Species of shrub endemic to Australia

Grevillea mollis, commonly known as soft grevillea, is a species of flowering plant in the family Proteaceae and is endemic to a restricted area of north-eastern New South Wales. It is an open, spreading shrub with oblong to elliptic leaves and loose clusters of bright scarlet red flowers.

== Description ==
Grevillea mollis is an open, spreading shrub that typically grows to a height of 1–2 m (3 ft 3 in – 6 ft 7 in) and has shaggy-hairy branchlets. Its leaves are oblong to narrowly oblong or elliptic, 30–100 mm (1.2–3.9 in) long and 4–14 mm (0.16–0.55 in) wide. The upper surface is covered with soft hairs, the lower side with shaggy hairs and the edges are wavy. The flowers are arranged in loose clusters of four to eight on a peduncle up to 12 mm (0.47 in) long, the rachis 4–14 mm (0.16–0.55 in) long with young buds developing as the older flowers fade. The flowers are bright scarlet red, the pistil 16–17 mm (0.63–0.67 in) long with a green to yellow pollen presenter. Flowering mainly occurs from August to November and the fruit is an elliptic follicle 20–22 mm (0.79–0.87 in) long.

== Taxonomy ==
Grevillea mollis was first formally described in 1994 by Peter M. Olde and Bill Molyneux in the journal Telopea from specimens collected in 1993 in the Gibraltar Range National Park. The specific epithet (mollis) means "soft", referring to the texture of the leaves.

== Distribution and habitat ==
Soft grevillea grows on ridges, rocky slopes and creek flats in tall forest and is only known from the Gibraltar Range and Nymboida national parks in north-eastern New South Wales.

== Conservation status ==
This grevillea is listed as endangered under the Australian Government Environment Protection and Biodiversity Conservation Act 1999 and the New South Wales Government Biodiversity Conservation Act 2016. The main threats to the species are its small population size and restricted distribution, inappropriate fire regimes and visitor impacts.
