= Grevillea hockingsii =

Conservation status
- Vulnerable (NCA)

Scientific classification
- Kingdom: Plantae
- Clade: Embryophytes
- Clade: Tracheophytes
- Clade: Angiosperms
- Clade: Eudicots
- Order: Proteales
- Family: Proteaceae
- Genus: Grevillea
- Species: G. hockingsii

Binomial name
- Grevillea hockingsii Molyneux & Olde

Species of shrub endemic to Queensland, Australia

Grevillea hockingsii is a species of flowering plant in the family Proteaceae and is endemic to south-eastern Queensland. It is an erect shrub with oblong to narrowly elliptic leaves and clusters of reddish-pink flowers.

== Description ==
Grevillea hockingsii is a dense, erect shrub that typically grows to a height of 1.5–2 m (4 ft 11 in – 6 ft 7 in) high and has ascending, silky-hairy branchlets. Its adult leaves are oblong to narrowly elliptic, 40–140 mm (1.6–5.5 in) long and 4–18 mm (0.16–0.71 in) wide. The lower surface of the leaves is silky-hairy. The flowers are arranged in leaf axils or on the stems in clusters of two to ten 15–22 mm (0.59–0.87 in) long on a rachis 2–5 mm (0.079–0.197 in) long, each flower on a pedicel about 4 mm (0.16 in) long. The flowers are reddish pink, hairy and slightly rust-coloured, the pistil 13–17.5 mm (0.51–0.69 in) long. Flowering mainly occurs from June to December and the fruit is an elliptic to narrowly oval follicle 20–36 mm (0.79–1.42 in) long.

== Taxonomy ==
Grevillea hockingsii was first formally described in 2008 by Bill Molyneux and Peter M. Olde in the journal Telopea from specimens collected in the Coominglah State Forest, Queensland in 1989. The specific epithet (hockingsii) honours Francis David Hockings who discovered the species in 1983.

== Distribution and habitat ==
This grevillea grows in the shrubby understorey of woodland or open forest in a three disjunct areas in south-eastern Queensland.

== Conservation status ==
Grevillea hockingsii is listed as 'Vulnerable' under the Queensland Government Nature Conservation Act 1992.

== See also ==
- List of Grevillea species
