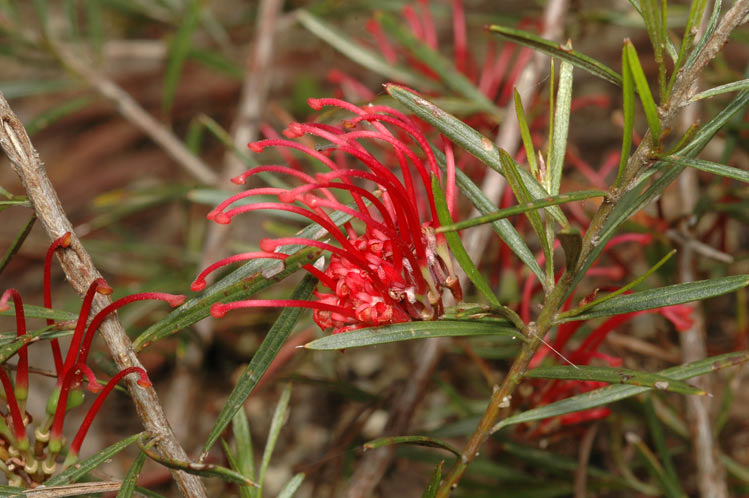
- In the Australian National Botanic Gardens

Conservation status
- Vulnerable (IUCN 3.1)

- Endangered (EPBC Act)

Scientific classification
- Kingdom: Plantae
- Clade: Tracheophytes
- Clade: Angiosperms
- Clade: Eudicots
- Order: Proteales
- Family: Proteaceae
- Genus: Grevillea
- Species: G. molyneuxii

Binomial name
- Grevillea molyneuxii McGill.

= Grevillea molyneuxii =

Species of shrub endemic to Australia

Grevillea molyneuxii, commonly known as Wingello grevillea, is a species of flowering plant in the family Proteaceae and is endemic to a restricted area of south-eastern New South Wales. It is a spreading shrub with narrowly oblong or narrowly elliptic to linear leaves and cylindrical clusters of reddish flowers.

== Description ==
Grevillea molyneuxii is a spreading to weakly erect shrub that typically grows to a height of 0.2–1 m (7.9 in – 3 ft 3.4 in). Its leaves are narrowly oblong or narrowly elliptic to linear, 15–45 mm (0.59–1.77 in) long, 1–3 mm (0.039–0.118 in) wide and sometimes sharply-pointed. The upper surface of the leaves is smooth and the lower side is silky-hairy, sometimes hidden by the downturned edges of the leaves. The flowers are arranged in clusters of 5 to 15 on the ends of the branches on a peduncle 3–15 mm (0.12–0.59 in) long. The flowers are red or reddish, the pistil 18–21 mm (0.71–0.83 in) long. Flowering occurs from August to November, and the fruit is an oval to elliptic follicle 12–14 mm (0.47–0.55 in) long.

== Taxonomy ==
Grevillea molyneuxii was first formally described in 1986 by Donald McGillivray in his book New Names in Grevillea (Proteaceae) from specimens collected near Wingello in 1973. The specific epithet (molyneuxii) honours the horticulturalist William Mitchell Molyneux.

== Distribution and habitat ==
Wingello grevillea grows in moist heath and shrubland in a few sites near Penrose in south-eastern New South Wales.

== Conservation status ==
Grevillea molyneuxii is listed as endangered under the Australian Government Environment Protection and Biodiversity Conservation Act 1999 and as vulnerable under the New South Wales Government Biodiversity Conservation Act 2016. The main threats to the species include its small population size and distribution, inappropriate fire regimes and digging by animals such as pigs.
