= Grevillea cyranostigma =

Conservation status
- Least Concern (IUCN 3.1)

Scientific classification
- Kingdom: Plantae
- Clade: Embryophytes
- Clade: Tracheophytes
- Clade: Spermatophytes
- Clade: Angiosperms
- Clade: Eudicots
- Order: Proteales
- Family: Proteaceae
- Genus: Grevillea
- Species: G. cyranostigma

Binomial name
- Grevillea cyranostigma McGill.

Species of shrub endemic to Queensland, Australia

Grevillea cyranostigma, commonly known as Carnarvon grevillea or green grevillea, is a species of flowering plant in the family Proteaceae and is endemic to the Carnarvon Range and adjacent areas of central Queensland. It is a spreading shrub with woolly-hairy to silky-hairy branchlets, narrowly oblong leaves, and pale green flowers.

== Description ==
Grevillea cyranostigma is a spreading shrub that typically grows to a height of 0.5–2 m (1 ft 8 in – 6 ft 7 in) and has cylindrical, woolly-hairy to silky-hairy branchlets. Its leaves are narrowly oblong, 20–55 mm (0.79–2.17 in) long and 5–11 mm (0.20–0.43 in) wide, the upper surface glabrous and glossy, the lower surface covered with silky hairs. The flowers are borne in loose clusters of a few flowers on the ends of branches and in leaf axils on a rachis 6–12 mm (0.24–0.47 in) long. The flowers are pale green and more or less glabrous, the pistil 16–17.5 mm (0.63–0.69 in) long and the style gently curved. Flowering occurs from June to October and the fruit is an oval to elliptic follicle 14–15 mm (0.55–0.59 in) long.

== Taxonomy ==
Grevillea cyranostigma was first formally described in 1975 by Don McGillivray in the journal Telopea from specimens collected between 1890 and 1895 by Harriette Biddulph of Mount Playfair Station, who was known for her collection of plants from the Carnarvon Range. The specific epithet (cyranostigma) is a reference to Edmond Rostand's play, Cyrano de Bergerac, as the long stigma is reminiscent of the character's protruding nose.

The species appears to be related to Grevillea sericea and G. victoriae, and is distinguished by glossier leaves than the former and a less hairy perianth than both.

== Distribution and habitat ==
Carnarvon grevillea is restricted to the Carnarvon Range in Central Queensland, where it is found on rocky slopes on sandstone soils in dry sclerophyll forest.

== Conservation status ==
This grevillea is listed as least concern on the IUCN Red List of Threatened Species and under the Queensland Government Nature Conservation Act 1992. It has a wide distribution and faces no known major threats, either current or in the near future.

== Use in horticulture ==
Grevillea cyranostigma has been grown in gardens in Brisbane and Melbourne and appears to adapt readily to cultivation, although does not tolerate extended dry periods. It has been mainly cultivated by collectors and enthusiasts of grevilleas.
