= Aberfeldy River =

River in Victoria, Australia

Aberfeldy
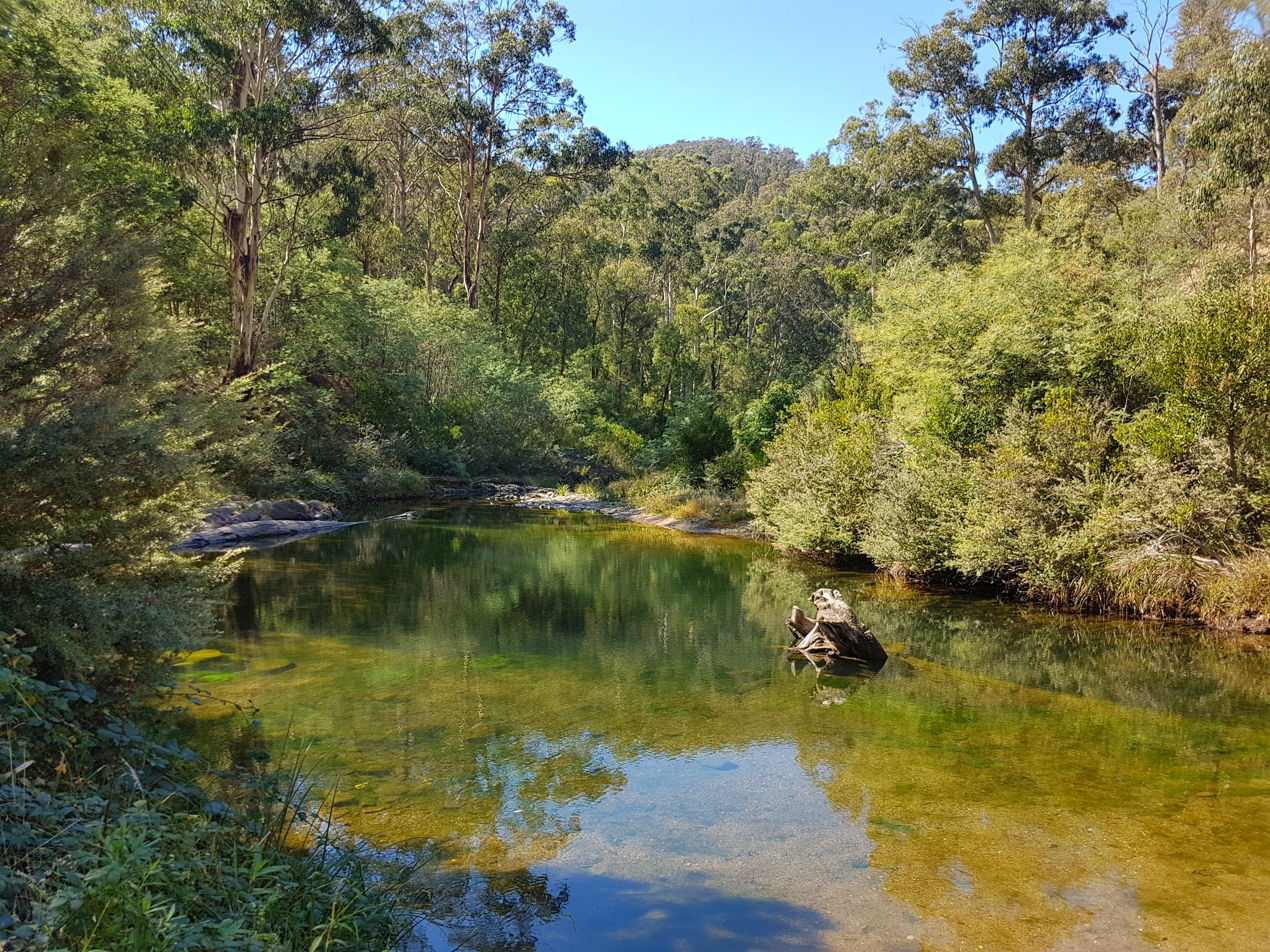
- View of the Aberfeldy River from Aberfeldy Bridge at Baw Baw National Park.

- Location of the Aberfeldy River mouth in Victoria
- Native name: Nambruc (Woiwurrung)

Location
- Country: Australia
- State: Victoria
- Region: Victorian Alps (IBRA), West Gippsland
- Local government area: Shire of Baw Baw

Physical characteristics
- Source confluence: North and South Branches of the Aberfeldy River
  - location: below Mount Selma
  - coordinates: 37°39′16″S 146°25′48″E
  - elevation: 662 m (2,172 ft)
- Mouth: confluence with the Thomson River
  - location: north of Rawson
  - coordinates: 37°44′39″S 146°21′41″E
  - elevation: 253 m (830 ft)
- Length: 49 km (30 mi)

Basin features
- River system: West Gippsland catchment

The Aberfeldy River is a perennial river of the West Gippsland catchment, in the Alpine region of the Australian state of Victoria.

== Features and location ==
Formed by the confluence of the north and south branches of the river, the Aberfeldy River rises in a state forestry area below Mount Selma on part of the Great Dividing Range. The river flows generally southwest then south, joined by two minor tributaries, before reaching its confluence with the Thomson River north of Rawson, in the Shire of Baw Baw. The river descends 409 metres (1,342 ft) over its 49-kilometre (30 mi) course.

== Etymology ==
In the Aboriginal Brataualung language the river is named Nambruc, meaning "plenty of black opossums".

== See also ==
- List of rivers of Australia § Victoria
