= Mount Selma =

Mountain in Victoria, Australia

- Location within Victoria

Highest point
- Elevation: 1,463 metres (4,800 ft) AHD
- Coordinates: 37°37′22″S 146°26′05″E

Geography
- Location: Victoria, Australia
- Parent range: Great Dividing Range

Mount Selma is a mountain located to the north-east of Aberfeldy in Victoria, Australia. Its peak is 1463 metres above sea level. The headwaters of the Aberfeldy River rise on its southerly slopes.

== Access ==
The unsealed Mount Selma Road passes to the north of the summit and divides the Toombon State Forest (to the south) from Licola State Forest (to the north). The summit of the mountain has a trigonometrical station and is accessible by four-wheel drive vehicles via Mount Selma Track. The Australian Alps Walking Track follows the alignment of Mount Selma Road.

== Bushfires ==
In the summer of 2006–2007, the area was burned during the Eastern Victoria Great Divide bushfires. Before the fire reached the mountain, the army was called in to provide heavy machinery to clear a firebreak along Mount Selma Track to protect the Thomson Reservoir catchment. Christians Hut, a mountain hut near Mount Selma, was destroyed by the bushfires.

== Flora ==
The Selma Saddle grevillea (Grevillea miqueliana subsp. cincta) is endemic to a small area near Mount Selma. Road works, logging and controlled burning are potential threats to the population The subspecies is listed as endangered on the Advisory List of Rare Or Threatened Plants In Victoria - 2014.

== See also ==
- Alpine National Park
- List of mountains in Australia § Victoria
