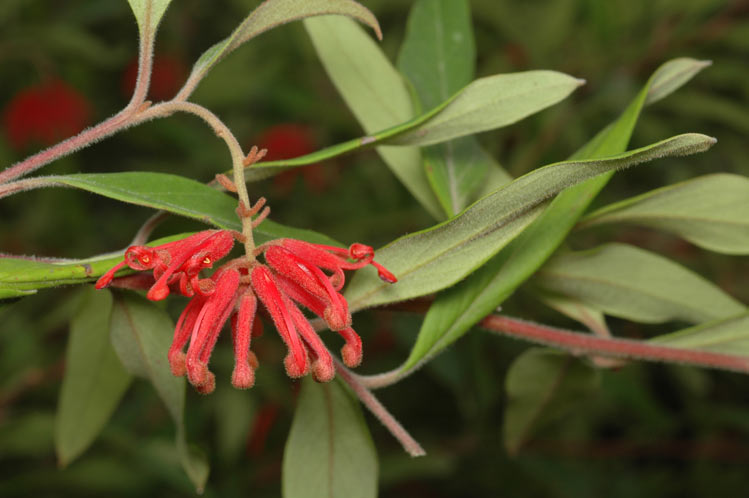
- In the Australian National Botanic Gardens

Conservation status
- Near Threatened (IUCN 3.1)

Scientific classification
- Kingdom: Plantae
- Clade: Embryophytes
- Clade: Tracheophytes
- Clade: Spermatophytes
- Clade: Angiosperms
- Clade: Eudicots
- Order: Proteales
- Family: Proteaceae
- Genus: Grevillea
- Species: G. epicroca

Binomial name
- Grevillea epicroca Stajsic & Molyneux

Synonyms
- Grevillea victoriae 'Unassigned 5'

= Grevillea epicroca =

Species of shrub endemic to Australia

Grevillea epicroca is a species of flowering plant in the family Proteaceae and is endemic to south-eastern New South Wales. It is a shrub with elliptic to lance-shaped leaves and red, silky-hairy flowers.

== Description ==
Grevillea epicroca is a shrub that typically grows up to 1–2.5 m (3 ft 3 in – 8 ft 2 in) high and has branchlets with a few silky hairs. Its leaves are elliptic to lance-shaped, mostly 40–70 mm (1.6–2.8 in) long and 8–12 mm (0.31–0.47 in) wide, the lower surface with a few silky hairs pressed against the surface. The flowers are arranged in small groups near the ends of branchets on a rachis 10–25 mm (0.39–0.98 in) long. The flowers are red and silky-hairy, the style red or pinkish and more or less glabrous, and the pistil 16–20 mm (0.63–0.79 in) long. Flowering mainly occurs from November to May and the fruit is a follicle 18–24 mm (0.71–0.94 in) long.

== Taxonomy ==
Grevillea epicroca was first formally described in 2000 by Val Stajsic and Bill Molyneux in the Flora of Australia from specimens collected by Michael Crisp near Braidwood in 1976. The specific epithet (epicroca) means "a transparent woman's garment", referring to the thin layer of hairs on the lower surface of the leaves.

== Distribution and habitat ==
This grevillea grows in moist forest on steep rocky slopes on the escarpment west of Moruya at altitudes between 700 and 1,000 m (2,300 and 3,300 ft) in south-eastern New South Wales.

== Conservation status ==
Grevillea epicroca is listed as near threatened on the IUCN Red List of Threatened Species. It has a severely restricted distribution and a highly fragmented population, however, the species is not believed to be declining in population, habitat quality, extent of occurrence and area of occupancy and the full number of subpopulations is unknown. There are no known substantial threats to this species and the population is presumed to be largely stable.
