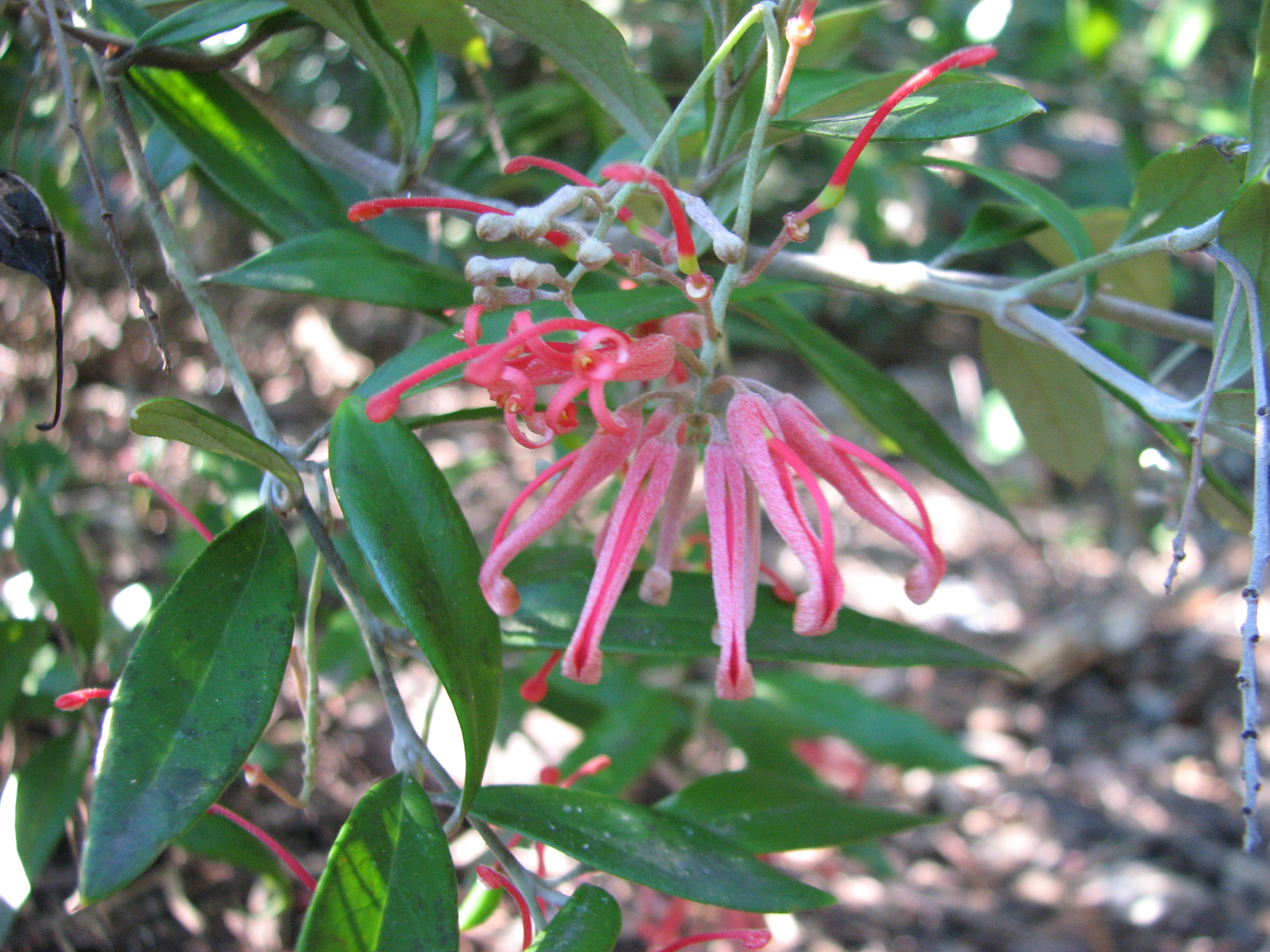
- In the Royal Botanic Gardens Victoria

Scientific classification
- Kingdom: Plantae
- Clade: Tracheophytes
- Clade: Angiosperms
- Clade: Eudicots
- Order: Proteales
- Family: Proteaceae
- Genus: Grevillea
- Species: G. parvula

Binomial name
- Grevillea parvula Molyneux & Stajsic

Synonyms
- Grevillea sp. 3 subsp. 1; Grevillea sp. 3 subsp. 2 (Mt Kaye); Grevillea victoriae Mallacoota Inlet p.p.; Grevillea victoriae 'race f' p.p.; Grevillea victoriae var. leptoneura Benth.

= Grevillea parvula =

Species of shrub endemic to Australia

Grevillea parvula, commonly known as Genoa grevillea, is a species of flowering plant in the family Proteaceae and is endemic to an area near the border between New South Wales and Victoria in south-eastern continental Australia. It is a spreading to erect shrub, usually with elliptic leaves, and down-turned clusters of pinkish to red flowers.

== Description ==
Grevillea parvula is a spreading, sometimes compact shrub that typically grows to a height of 1–2 m (3 ft 3 in – 6 ft 7 in) and has woolly- to shaggy-hairy branchlets. Its leaves are usually ellicptic or narrowly elliptic, sometimes lance-shaped or narrowly egg-shaped with the narrower end towards the base, mostly 25–40 mm (0.98–1.57 in) long and 8–18 mm (0.31–0.71 in) wide. The edges of the leaves are turned down, the upper surface of the leaves smooth, the lower surface densely silky-hairy. The flowers are arranged on the ends of branches or in leaf axils in down-turned clusters of 8 to 36 flowers, on a rachis 5–16 mm (0.20–0.63 in) long. The flowers are pinkish to red, the style red or reddish-pink, and the pistil is 17–20 mm (0.67–0.79 in) long. Flowering mainly occurs from October to March and the fruit is a glabrous follicle 17–19.5 mm (0.67–0.77 in) long.

== Taxonomy ==
This taxon was first formally described in 1870 as Grevillea victoriae var. leptoneura by English botanist George Bentham in the fifth volume of Flora Australiensis from specimens collected by Ferdinand von Mueller near the headwaters of the Genoa River. In 2000, Bill Molyneux and Val Stajsic raised the variety to species status as Grevillea parvula in the Flora of Australia. The specific epithet (parvula) is the diminutive form of the Latin word parvus meaning "small", referring to the size of the leaves, flowers and follicles which are smaller than those of closely related grevilleas.

== Distribution and habitat ==
Grevillea parvula usually grows in forest near watercourses, sometimes in woodland, from sea level to an altitude of over 1,100 m (3,600 ft). It is found between Eden and the Main Range and near the Wallagaraugh and Towamba Rivers in the far south-east of New South Wales and in the far east of Victoria.

== Conservation status ==
This species is listed as "endangered" under the Victorian Government Flora and Fauna Guarantee Act 1988 and as "Rare in Victoria" on the Department of Sustainability and Environment's Advisory List of Rare Or Threatened Plants In Victoria.

== Use in horticulture ==
The cultivar Grevillea 'Canterbury Gold' is a hybrid between a prostrate yellow form of Grevillea juniperina and this species.
