= Mount Gibbo =

Mountain in Victoria, Australia

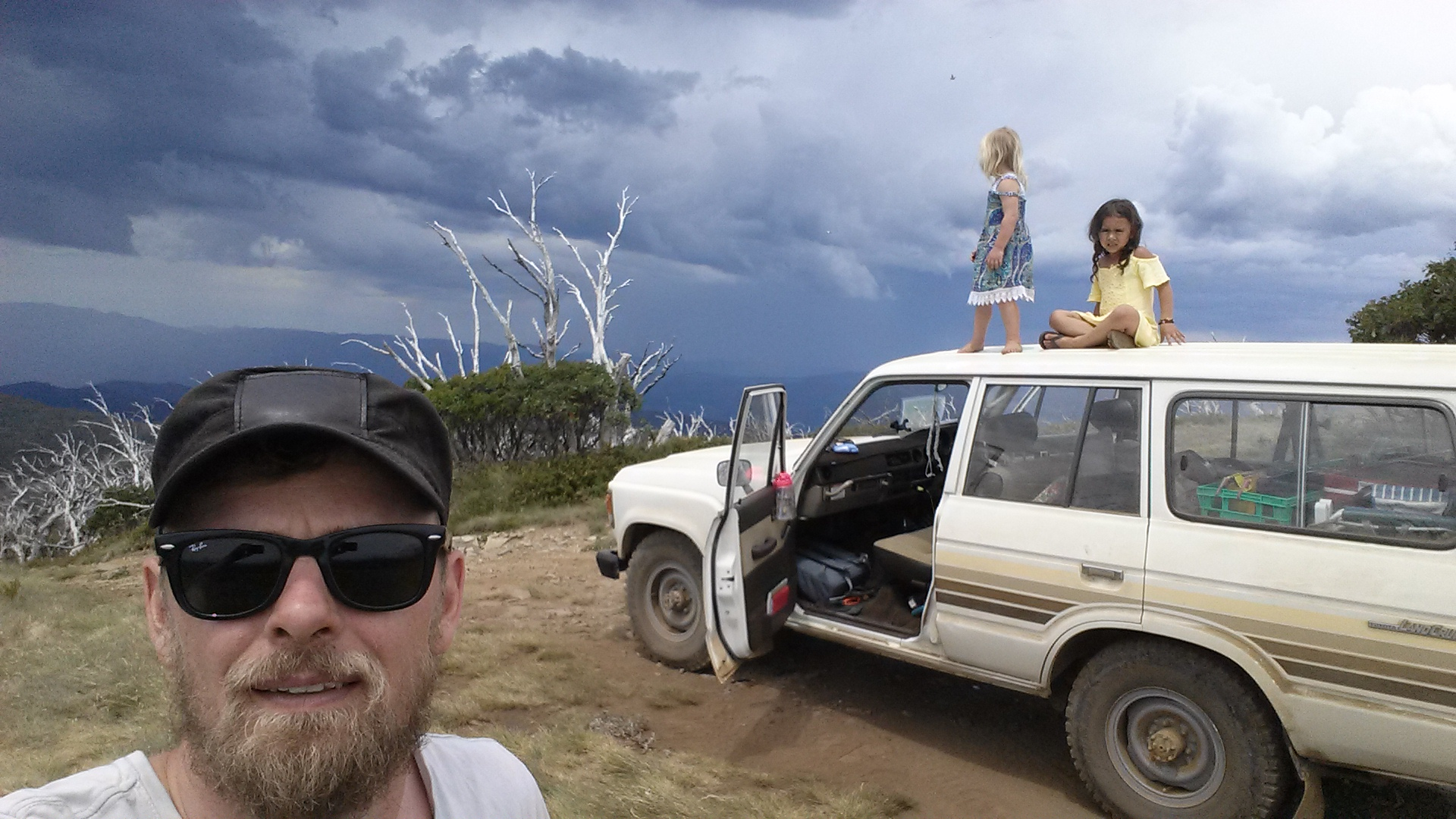
- Watching a storm roll in over the Upper Murray River catchment area, from Mount Gibbo

Highest point
- Elevation: 1,757 metres (5,764 ft) AHD
- Coordinates: 36°36′42″S 147°57′43″E

Geography
- Location within Victoria
- Location: Victoria, Australia
- Parent range: Great Dividing Range

Mount Gibbo is a mountain in the Australian Alps. It is 38 kilometres to the north-east of Benambra in Victoria, Australia and lies within the Mount Gibbo Natural Features and Scenic Reserve managed by Parks Victoria. The reserve, which covers 1493.1 hectares, was established in 1979. On the northern side of the mountain, Ordovician sediments are exposed on the steep slopes. Surrounding peaks include Mount Pinnibar (1772 metres) to the north, Mount Hope (1558 metres) to the south-east and Mount Sassafras (1587 metres) to the west. Plant species found in the reserve include the rare Alpine phebalium (Phebalium squamulosum subsp. ozothamnoides) and the endangered Kosciuszko grevillea (Grevillea victoriae subsp. nivalis). The area was extensively burned by a bushfire in 2003.

== See also ==
- Alpine National Park
- List of mountains in Australia § Victoria
