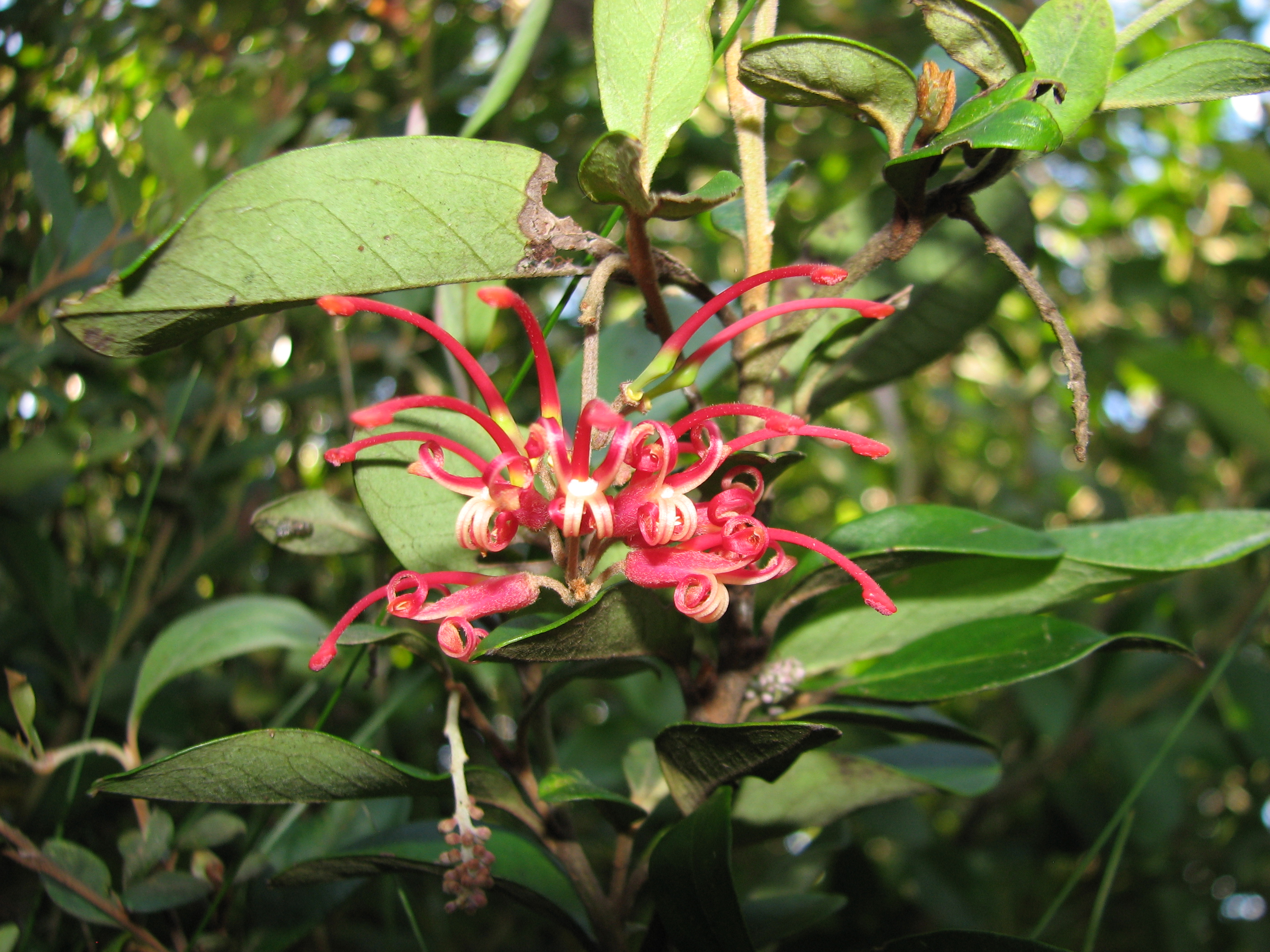
- Subspecies cincta near Mount Selma

Scientific classification
- Kingdom: Plantae
- Clade: Tracheophytes
- Clade: Angiosperms
- Clade: Eudicots
- Order: Proteales
- Family: Proteaceae
- Genus: Grevillea
- Species: G. miqueliana

Binomial name
- Grevillea miqueliana F.Muell.

= Grevillea miqueliana =

Species of shrub endemic to Victoria, Australia

Grevillea miqueliana is a species of flowering plant in the family Proteaceae and is endemic to Victoria in Australia. It is an erect to spreading shrub with elliptic to egg-shaped leaves and clusters of red and orange or yellow flowers.

== Description ==
Grevillea miqueliana is a spreading shrub that typically grows to a height of 1.5–2.5 m (4 ft 11 in – 8 ft 2 in) and has shaggy- to woolly-hairy branchlets. The leaves are elliptic to egg-shaped, sometimes with the narrower end towards the base, 9–85 mm (0.35–3.35 in) long and 15–30 mm (0.59–1.18 in) wide with the edges turned down or rolled under. The lower surface is covered with velvety to shaggy hairs. The flowers are usually arranged on the ends of branches or in leaf axils in oval to cylindrical clusters of 6 to 20 on a rachis 11–22 mm (0.43–0.87 in) long. The flowers are red with yellow or orange blotches, the pistil 18.2–22.5 mm (0.72–0.89 in) long. Flowering occurs in most months, in the absence of snow, and the fruit is a follicle 15–20 mm (0.59–0.79 in) long.

== Taxonomy ==
Grevillea miqueliana was first formally described in 1855 by Ferdinand von Mueller in his Definitions of rare or hitherto undescribed Australian plants. The species epithet honours Dutch botanist Friedrich Anton Wilhelm Miquel.

In 2000, William Molyneux and Val Stajsic described two subspecies of G. miqueliana in the Flora of Australia, and in 2006, they described a third in the journal Muelleria. The names of the three subspecies are accepted by the Australian Plant Census:

- Grevillea miqueliana subsp. cincta Molyneux & Stajsic, commonly known as Selma Saddle grevillea
- Grevillea miqueliana F.Muell. subsp. miqueliana, commonly known as oval-leaf grevillea
- Grevillea miqueliana subsp. moroka Molyneux & Stajsic commonly known as Moroka grevillea

The main difference between the morphology of the subspecies is the nature of the hairs on the branches and leaves.

== Distribution and habitat ==
Grevillea miqueliana occurs in montane areas of eastern Victoria. Subspecies cincta is only known from two sites in subalpine areas of central Gippsland, including Mount Selma. Subspecies miqueliana is more widely distributed in central Gippsland and alpine areas of Victoria, at altitudes between 300 and 1,400 m (980 and 4,590 ft) and subsp. moroka is found at altitudes between 1,400 and 1,500 m (4,600 and 4,900 ft) in alpine areas, include the Moroka River region.

== Conservation status ==
Subspecies cincta is listed as endangered and subspp. miqueliana and moroka are listed as vulnerable under the Victorian Government Flora and Fauna Guarantee Act 1988.
