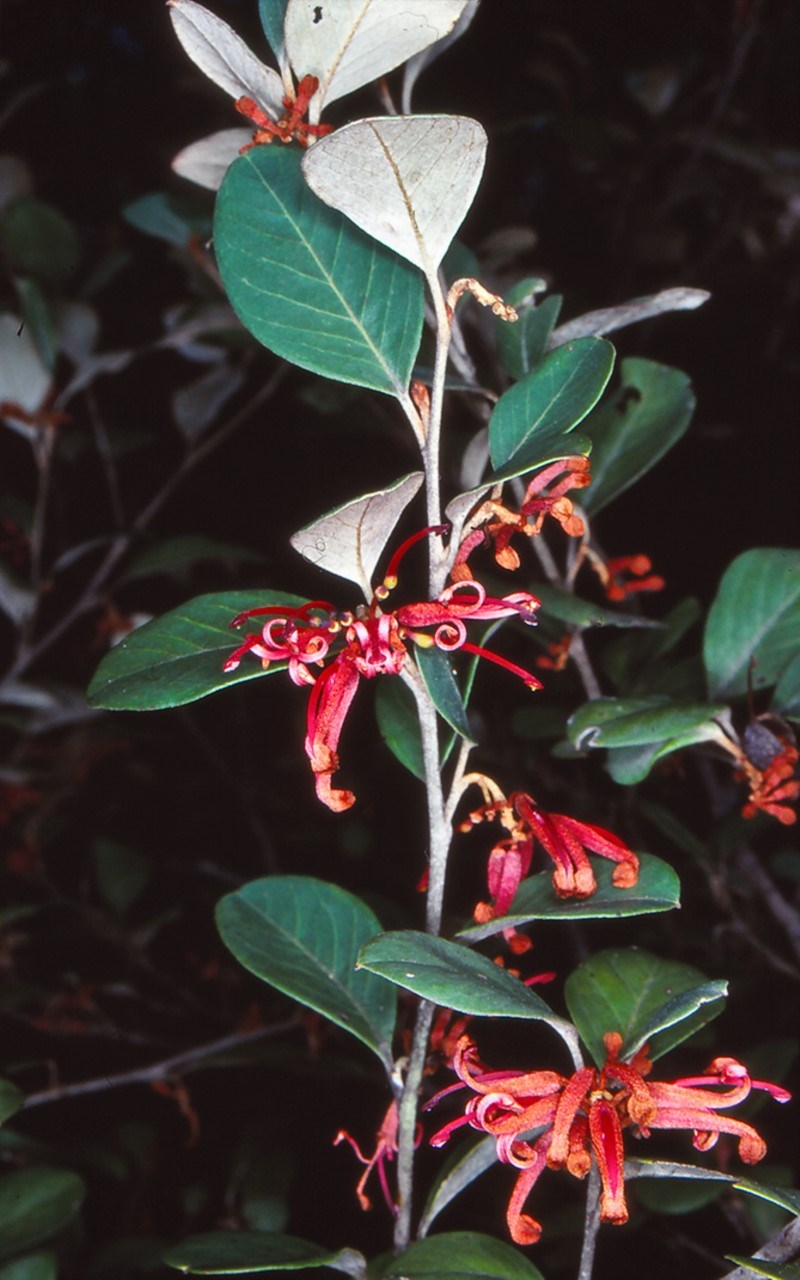
- Subsp. oxyantha in Deua National Park

Scientific classification
- Kingdom: Plantae
- Clade: Tracheophytes
- Clade: Angiosperms
- Clade: Eudicots
- Order: Proteales
- Family: Proteaceae
- Genus: Grevillea
- Species: G. oxyantha

Binomial name
- Grevillea oxyantha Makinson

= Grevillea oxyantha =

Species of shrub endemic to Australia

Grevillea oxyantha is a species of flowering plant in the family Proteaceae and is endemic to south-eastern continental Australia. It is an erect to spreading shrub with somewhat silky-hairy branchlets, broadly elliptic to broadly egg-shaped or almost round leaves, and hairy, crimson and pink flowers with a red style.

== Description ==
Grevillea oxyantha is an erect to spreading shrub that typically grows to a height of 1–3 m (3 ft 3 in – 9 ft 10 in) and has silky-hairy branchlets. Its leaves are broadly elliptic to broadly egg-shaped or almost round, 20–60 mm (0.79–2.36 in) long and 15–35 mm (0.59–1.38 in) wide, the lower surface covered with woolly or silky hairs. The flowers are arranged in more or less cylindrical clusters on a rachis 8–45 mm (0.31–1.77 in) long. The flowers are scarlet to crimson and woolly- or silky-hairy on the outside, pink inside, the pistil 18–24 mm (0.71–0.94 in) long. Flowering mainly occurs from August to December and the fruit is a glabrous, oval to elliptic follicle 15–20 mm (0.59–0.79 in) long.

== Taxonomy ==
Grevillea oxyantha was first formally described in 1997 by Robert Owen Makinson in the journal Telopea from specimens collected by R.D. Hoogland near Mount Franklin in 1961. The specific epithet (oxyantha) means "sharp-flowered", referring to the shape of part of the flower bud.

In the same edition of the journal Telopea, Makinson described two subspecies of G. oxyantha and the names are accepted by the Australian Plant Census:

- Grevillea oxyantha subsp. ecarinata Makinson has egg-shaped to elliptic leaves, the lower surface with straight, silky hairs.
- Grevillea oxyantha Makinson subsp. oxyantha has broadly egg-shaped to elliptic or more or less round leaves, the lower surface with woolly, curved to wavy hairs.

== Distribution and habitat ==
This grevillea usually grows in rocky places in the forest, often near peaks or cliffs, and is found from near Wee Jasper to near Tumut, Batlow and Brown Mountain. Subspecies oxyantha is mostly found in the Brindabella, Tinderry and Kybean Ranges, and south to Brown Mountain in south-eastern New South Wales and the Australian Capital Territory. There are also records from Taradale in central Victoria. Subspecies ecarinata occurs from near Wee Jasper to Tumut and Batlow.
