= Bill Molyneux =

Australian horticulturalist

William Mitchell Molyneux (born 1935) is an Australian horticulturist and author who has researched and developed many popular cultivars of Australian plants, including Banksia 'Birthday Candles', and Isopogon 'Woorikee 2000'. Grevillea molyneuxii was named in his honour.

He has also written books for the Australian garden. Bill lives at Wombat Bend in Victoria Australia surrounded by examples of his work and passions.
