= Flora and Fauna Guarantee Act 1988 =

Act of parliament of Victoria, Australia

Parliament of Victoria
- Long title: An Act to provide for the conservation and management of flora and fauna.
- Citation: No. 47 of 1988
- Royal assent: 24 May 1988

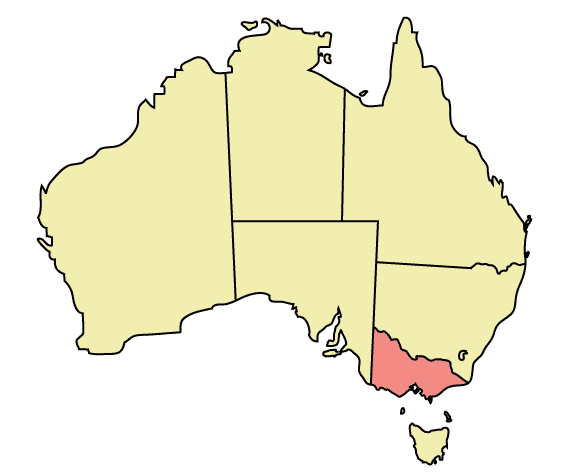
Victoria

The Flora and Fauna Guarantee Act 1988 (No. 47 of 1988), also known as the FFG Act, is an act of the Victorian Parliament designed to protect species, genetic material and habitats, to prevent extinction and allow maximum genetic diversity within the Australian state of Victoria for perpetuity. It was the first Australian legislation to deal with such issues. It enables the listing of threatened species and communities and threats to native species, and the declaration of critical habitat necessary for the survival of native plants and animals.

After an extensive review of the act in 2019, the Flora and Fauna Guarantee Amendment Act 2019 (No. 28 of 2019) modernised and strengthened the provisions of the act on 1 June 2020. Enforcement of the FFG Act is overseen by the Office of the Conservation Regulator (OCR).

== Description ==
The Flora and Fauna Guarantee Act 1988 helps protect and manage the biodiversity of the state of Victoria. It aims to conserve all of Victoria’s native plants and animals. In order to achieve this, the act enables a number of mechanisms, such as listing threatened species, communities and threats to native species; the establishment of a statewide biodiversity management strategy; declaring certain areas as critical habitat; requiring public authorities to take the act into account in their operations; and requiring permits for certain activities which may affect native plants and animals.

== Criticisms ==
Lawyers for Forests (LFF) published a review of the act in 2002, and found a lack of resources to enforce the act, a lack of government transparency and accountability, that the act may be and is ignored in government decisionmaking, and that the act is generally unenforceable. The review identified the following factors:

- Lack of political will for the implementation of the FFG Act.
- Lack of funding and resources to allow the Department of Natural Resources and Environment (NRE) to effectively implement the Act.
- Objectives of the FFG Act being overridden by objectives and interests of bodies with conflicting agendas, such as the forestry industry.

As well as a general review, the review considers the impact of the act on the Leadbeater's possum, the powerful owl and the tiger quoll, as well as on a threatened community and a threatening process. For example, it considers the concern of environmentalists for the small and poorly placed Special Protection and Management Zones for the tiger quoll, the continuing clear-fell logging followed by slash burns in their management zones, and the failure to stop the use of 1080 poison, which is a threat to the species.

LFF recommended that the NRE should receive appropriate funding to fully implement the FFG Act, and the government commit to NRE fulfilling its obligations under the act. The group further recommended that the act should be enforceable, and NRE should be accountable in its efforts to fulfil its obligations under the act.

Other environmental groups have echoed the review; for example, the "delays or lack of implementation of key documents required under the FFG Act" was noted by the Victorian Rainforest Network in 2003.

== 2019 review and amendment ==
A major review was undertaken in 2019, resulting in the enactment of the Flora and Fauna Guarantee Amendment Act 2019, by which amendments to the FFG Act took effect from 1 June 2020. The amendments modernised and strengthened some of the provisions of the act, such as action preventing species from becoming threatened; adopting the Common Assessment Method, consistent with the national method for assessment and listing of threatened species (as per the Environment Protection and Biodiversity Conservation Act 1999 (Cth)); setting up a reporting requirement on the implementation of the statewide Biodiversity Strategy. It also improved powers for enforcement and increased penalties for breaches of the legislation.

Other significant reforms included the introduction of a set of principles to guide decision making (including consultation with traditional owners and the public); a new definition of "critical habitat" to replace the previous one which was too hard to prove and thus implement; the introduction of habitat conservation orders; setting up a new register; and an obligation for the Commissioner for Environmental Sustainability to report on achievement of targets in the Biodiversity Strategy every five years.

Enforcement of the FFG Act would now be overseen by the Office of the Conservation Regulator (OCR), established in 2019.

== Related acts ==
Related acts include:

- Conservation, Forests and Lands Act 1987
- Sustainable Forest (Timber) Act 2004
- Forests Act 1958

== See also ==
- Environment Protection and Biodiversity Conservation Act 1999
- Environmental law in Victoria
