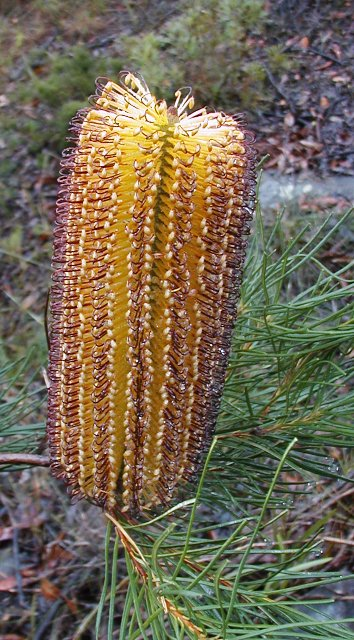
- Banksia spinulosa var. spinulosa, Georges River National Park

Scientific classification
- Kingdom: Plantae
- Clade: Tracheophytes
- Clade: Angiosperms
- Clade: Eudicots
- Order: Proteales
- Family: Proteaceae
- Genus: Banksia
- Species: B. spinulosa

Binomial name
- Banksia spinulosa Sm.

Varieties
- B. s. var. collina; B. s. var. cunninghamii; B. s. var. neoanglica; B. s. var. spinulosa
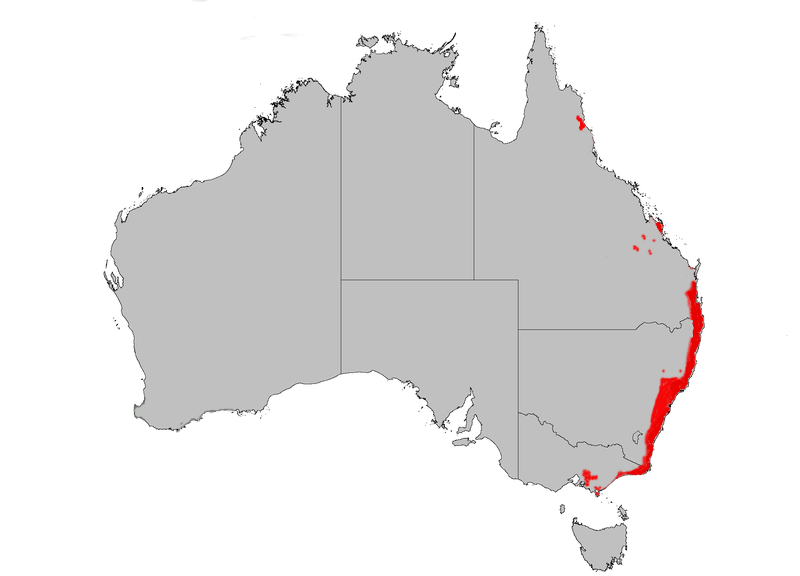
- Distribution map of Banksia spinulosa

= Banksia spinulosa =

Species of shrub native to eastern Australia

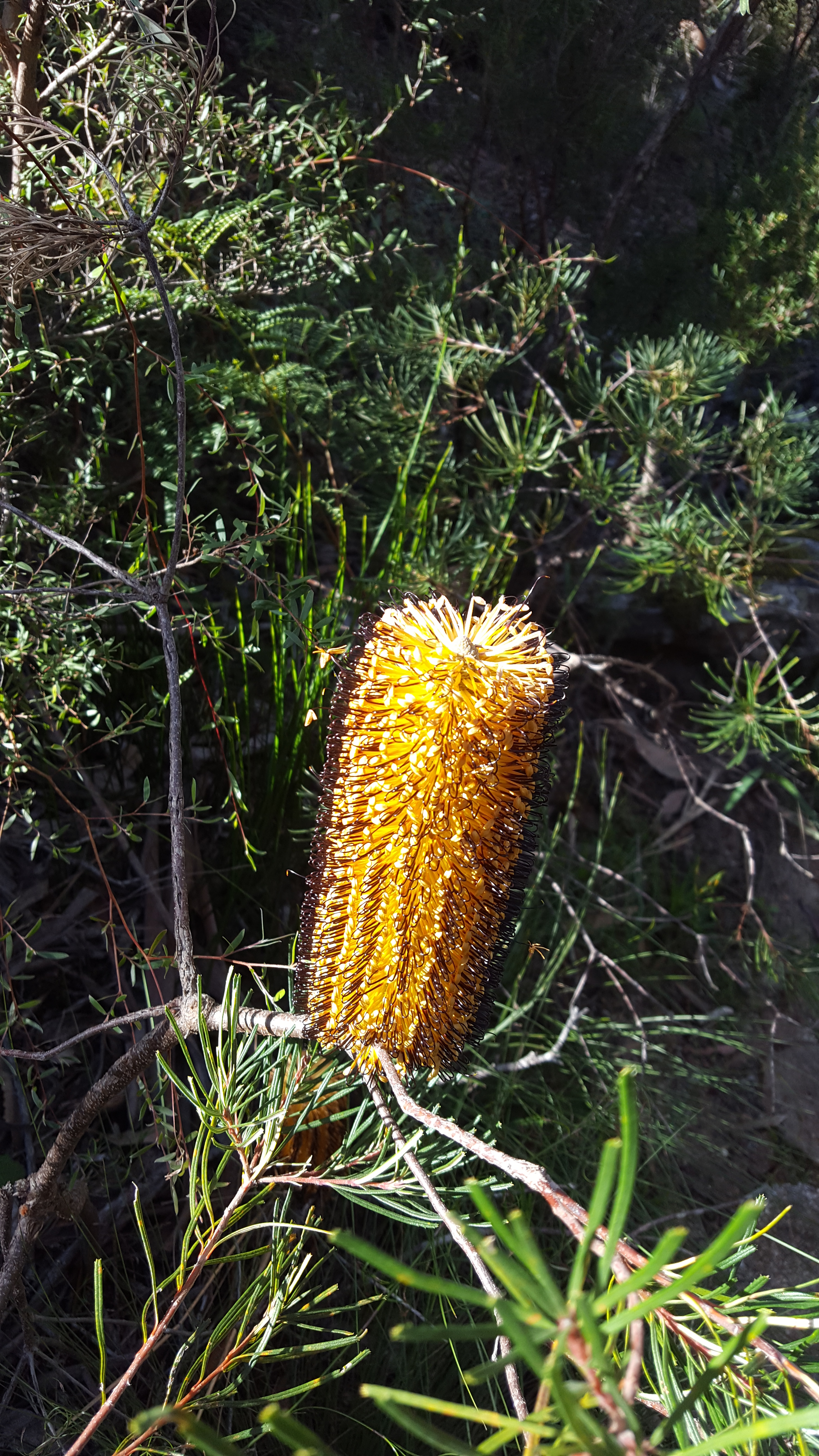
Hairpin banksia at Everglades Gardens, Leura

Banksia spinulosa, the hairpin banksia, is a species of woody shrub, of the genus Banksia in the family Proteaceae, native to eastern Australia. Widely distributed, it is found as an understorey plant in open dry forest or heathland from Victoria to northern Queensland, generally on sandstone though sometimes also clay soils. It generally grows as a small shrub to 2 metres (7 ft) in height, though can be a straggly tree to 6 metres (20 ft). It has long narrow leaves with inflorescences which can vary considerably in coloration; while the spikes are gold or less commonly yellowish, the emergent styles may be a wide range of colours – from black, purple, red, orange or yellow.

Banksia spinulosa was named by James Edward Smith in England in 1793, after being collected by John White, most likely in 1792. He gave it the common name prickly-leaved banksia, though this has fallen out of use. With four currently recognised varieties, the species has had a complicated taxonomic history, with two varieties initially described as separate species in the early 19th century. A fourth, from the New England region, has only recently been described. However, there has been disagreement whether one, var. cunninghamii, is distinct enough to once again have specific status. The pre-eminent authority on Banksia, Alex George, concedes there is still more work to be done on the Banksia spinulosa complex.

The hairpin banksia is pollinated by and provides food for a wide array of vertebrate and invertebrate animals in the autumn and winter months. Its floral display and fine foliage have made it a popular garden plant with many horticultural selections available. With the recent trend towards smaller gardens, compact dwarf forms of Banksia spinulosa have become popular; the first available, Banksia 'Birthday Candles', has achieved a great deal of commercial success and wide recognition, and has been followed by several others.

== Description ==
The hairpin banksia usually occurs as a multi-stemmed lignotuberous shrub 1–3 metres (3.3–9.8 ft) tall and 1–2 metres (3.3–6.6 ft) across. Alternatively, it may be single-stemmed and lacking a lignotuber, in which case it is often taller, up to 5 metres (16 feet) high. It has grey or grey-brown smooth bark with lenticels. The long, narrow leaves are 3–10 cm (1.2–3.9 in) in length, 1–8 mm wide and more or less linear in shape. Leaf edges are either serrate for the entire leaf length (collina) or toward the apex only (spinulosa), though the margins may be recurved and hence serrations not evident as in those from the Carnarvon Gorge. Immature leaves, which may also be seen after bushfire, are broader and serrated. Leaf undersides have fine white hairs in the case of the varieties spinulosa and collina and pale brown in cunninghamii and neoanglica.

The distinctive inflorescences or flower spikes occur over a short period through autumn and early winter. A spike may contain hundreds or thousands of individual flowers, each of which consists of a tubular perianth made up of four united tepals, and one long wiry style. Characteristic of the taxonomic section in which it is placed, the styles are hooked rather than straight. The style ends are initially trapped inside the upper perianth parts, but break free at anthesis. In Banksia spinulosa the spikes are cylindrical, about 6–7 centimetres (2.4–2.8 inches) wide and 6–15 centimetres (2.4–5.9 inches) tall, yellow to golden orange in colour, with styles varying from yellow to pink, maroon, or black. Styles of various colours may be found within metres of each other in some areas such as in the Georges River National Park, and Catherine Hill Bay, while other populations may have uniformly black, red or gold styles. Though not terminal, the flower spikes are fairly prominently displayed. Partly emerging from the foliage, they arise from two- to three-year-old stem nodes.

The hairpin banksia's infructescence is a typical Banksia cone-like structure, with up to 100 crowded embedded follicles which are 1–2.4 cm (0.4–0.9 in) in diameter; these generally remain closed until burnt by bushfire. The nonlignotuberous subspecies cunninghamii is killed by fire and regenerates from seed, while the others regenerate from buds around the base of the lignotuber. Old flower spikes fade to brown, then grey with age. Old flower parts usually persist for a long time, giving the infructescence a hairy appearance. In Central and North Queensland, old cones of both var. spinulosa and var. collina are generally bare.

== Taxonomy ==
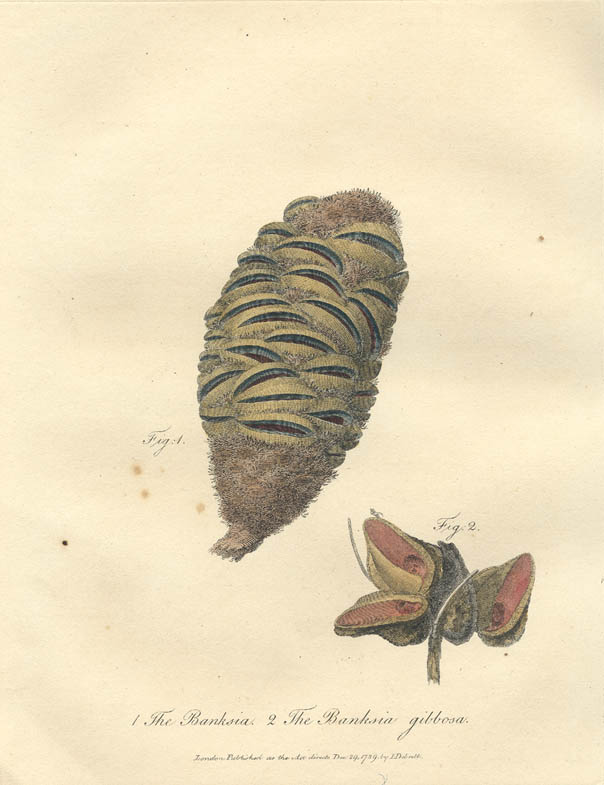
The Banksia infructescence in this drawing may be the first published reference to B. spinulosa.

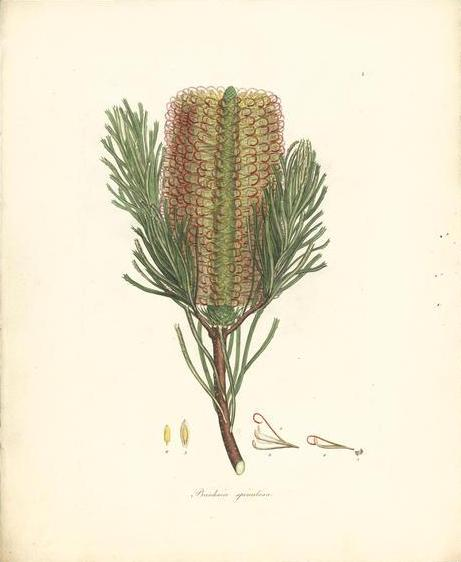
James Sowerby's painting of B. spinulosa, which accompanied James Edward Smith's formal publication of the species in 1793

The first known specimens of B. spinulosa were collected near Sydney by John White, Surgeon General to the British colony of New South Wales, sometime between 1788 and 1793. He called it "prickly-leaved banksia", though this name has fallen out of use. It is uncertain exactly when he first collected the species; it may have been before 1790, as there is speculation that a sketch in his 1790 Journal of a Voyage to New South Wales is of a B. spinulosa infructescence. Text accompanying the figure states:

[W]e cannot with certainty determine the species. The capsules are smooth, at least when ripe, and a little shining. We think this is neither the B. serrata, integrifolia, nor dentata of Linnaeus, nor probably his ericifolia; so that it seems to be a species hitherto undescribed. The leaves and flowers we have not seen.

English botanist James Edward Smith later tentatively attributed this figure to B. spinulosa:

We suspect the fruit figured in Mr. White's Voyage, page 225, fig. I, may belong to this species, but we have no positive authority to assert it.

More recently, however, Alf Salkin has argued that:

the cone illustrated by White is probably not as suggested from the B. spinulosa described by Smith but, may be from another member of the complex or from one of the forms of B. ericifolia.

White probably collected the type material of B. spinulosa in 1792. The following year, the species was formally described by Smith in his A Specimen of the Botany of New Holland. It was thus the seventh Banksia species collected, and the fifth described. Smith gave it the specific epithet spinulosa, a Latin term meaning having minute spines, probably in reference to the leaf tips. Thus the species' full name is Banksia spinulosa Sm.

=== Placement within Banksia ===
In the first infrageneric arrangement of Banksia, that of Brown in 1830, B. spinulosa was placed in subgenus Banksia verae, the "true banksias", because its inflorescence is a typical Banksia flower spike. It was placed next to B. cunninghamii and B. collina, both now considered varieties of B. spinulosa; these three were placed between B. ericifolia (heath-leaved banksia) and B. occidentalis (red swamp banksia). Banksia verae was renamed Eubanksia by Stephan Endlicher in 1847. Carl Meissner demoted Eubanksia to sectional rank in his 1856 classification, and divided it into four series, with B. spinulosa placed in series Abietinae, while B. cunninghamii and B. collina were placed alongside each other in series Salicinae. When George Bentham published his 1870 arrangement in Flora Australiensis, he discarded Meissner's series, placing all the species with hooked styles together in a section that he named Oncostylis. B. cunninghamii was reduced to synonymy with B. collina, as was the western species B. littoralis (western swamp banksia). This arrangement would stand for over a century.

Alex George published a new taxonomic arrangement of Banksia in his landmark 1981 monograph The genus Banksia L.f. (Proteaceae). Endlicher's Eubanksia became B. subg. Banksia, and was divided into three sections, one of which was Oncostylis. Oncostylis was further divided into four series, with B. spinulosa placed in series Spicigerae because its inflorescences are cylindrical.

In 1996, Kevin Thiele and Pauline Ladiges published a new arrangement for the genus, after cladistic analyses yielded a cladogram significantly different from George's arrangement. Thiele and Ladiges' arrangement retained B. spinulosa in series Spicigerae, placing it alone in B. subser. Spinulosae. This arrangement stood until 1999, when George effectively reverted to his 1981 arrangement in his monograph for the Flora of Australia series.

Under George's taxonomic arrangement of Banksia, B. spinulosa's taxonomic placement may be summarised as follows:

Genus Banksia

Subgenus Banksia

Section Banksia
Section Coccinea
Section Oncostylis

Series Spicigerae

B. spinulosa

B. spinulosa var. spinulosa
B. spinulosa var. collina
B. spinulosa var. neoanglica
B. spinulosa var. cunninghamii

B. ericifolia
B. verticillata
B. seminuda
B. littoralis
B. occidentalis
B. brownii

Series Tricuspidae
Series Dryandroidae
Series Abietinae

Subgenus Isostylis

More recent molecular research suggests that B. spinulosa and B. ericifolia may be more closely related to series Salicinae, with Banksia integrifolia and its relatives.

In 2005, Austin Mast, Eric Jones and Shawn Havery published the results of their cladistic analyses of DNA sequence data for Banksia. They inferred a phylogeny very greatly different from the accepted taxonomic arrangement, including finding Banksia to be paraphyletic with respect to Dryandra. A new taxonomic arrangement was not published at the time, but early in 2007 Mast and Thiele initiated a rearrangement by transferring Dryandra to Banksia, and publishing B. subg. Spathulatae for the species having spoon-shaped cotyledons. They foreshadowed publishing a full arrangement once DNA sampling of Dryandra was complete; in the meantime, if Mast and Thiele's nomenclatural changes are taken as an interim arrangement, then B. spinulosa is placed in B. subg. Spathulatae.

=== Varieties ===
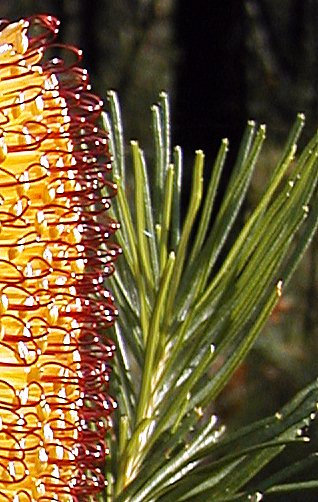
var. spinulosa, Nowra leaves with serrations near apex only

Four varieties are currently recognised:

B. spinulosa var. spinulosa
The nominate race is an autonym, a name that was automatically created for the original material of the species as the other subspecies were described. The original hairpin banksia, this plant is coastal in Queensland, seen in such places as Walshs Pyramid (near Cairns), Byfield National Park and the Blackdown Tableland, then again in New South Wales south of the Hawkesbury River, just north of Sydney, down the New South Wales South Coast and into Victoria. Northwards of the Hawkesbury River on Sydney's northern outskirts there is a gradation between this and B. spinulosa var. collina. It commonly has black, maroon or claret styles on gold spikes but all-gold inflorescences are seen, and leaves are generally narrower than other varieties at 1–2 mm in width and have several serrations toward the apex only.

B. spinulosa var. collina
Known as the hill banksia, it was first published as Banksia collina by Robert Brown in 1810, and retained species rank until 1981, when George demoted it to a variety of B. spinulosa. It differs from B. spinulosa var. spinulosa in having broader leaves 3–8 mm in width that have serrate margins. The leaf undersides have more prominent venation. Its flower spikes are usually gold, or sometimes gold with red styles, especially in New South Wales. It is found in inland gorges and tablelands such as Carnarvon Gorge, Expedition National Park, Isla Gorge and Dicks Tableland in a remote part of Eungella National Park, in Central Queensland but coastal on the New South Wales Central- and north coast.

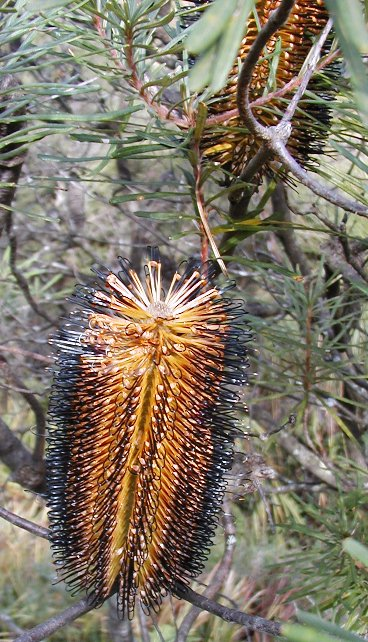
var. cunninghamii, Lyrebird Dell walk, Leura, Blue Mountains

B. spinulosa var. cunninghamii
This variety was published as B. cunninghamii in 1827 in honour of the botanist Allan Cunningham, and demoted to a variety of B. spinulosa in 1981. The demotion has not been universally accepted however: in New South Wales it is still given species rank, and B. spinulosa var. neoanglica is considered a subspecies of it. George notes that at locations where both var. spinulosa and var. cunninghamii coexist, such as Fitzroy Falls in Lawson, no intermediate forms occur. This plant is a fast-growing nonlignotuberous shrub or small tree to 6 metres (20 feet) in height, occurring in the Great Dividing Range from southeast Queensland to southern New South Wales and also in Victoria. The juvenile leaves are highly serrated, new branchlets are hairy and leaf undersides are pale brown rather than white as in the two previous varieties. Inflorescences are gold with black styles, though an all-yellow form from Victoria is known. The linear to oblanceolate adult leaves are 2–10 cm (0.79–3.94 in) long by 2–7 mm wide; those from Victoria having markedly longer juvenile leaves, and larger cotyledons.

B. spinulosa var. neoanglica
Known as the New England banksia, it was published by Alex George in 1988, based on a specimen collected by him in 1986. In New South Wales it is considered an unnamed subspecies of Banksia cunninghamii. This plant is found in the New England Region of far northern New South Wales and Southeastern Queensland. It is a short lignotuberous shrub to 1 metre (3 ft) in height. Inflorescences are gold with black styles. It has hairy new branchlets and pale brown leaf undersides.

Some doubt exists as to whether the current classification accurately represents relationships within the Banksia spinulosa complex. B. spinulosa var. collina is a form of inland gorges and tablelands in central Queensland, but is a coastal plant on the New South Wales central and north coast. B. spinulosa var. spinulosa, on the other hand, is coastal in central Queensland and in New South Wales south of Sydney. Similarly, B. spinulosa var. cunninghamii is widely separated between New South Wales and Victorian forms (where the longer leaved form was originally called B. prionophylla by Meissner). Notably both B. spinulosa var. spinulosa and B. spinulosa var. collina in northern Queensland have old spikes bare as opposed to them having persistent old flower parts in New South Wales and Victoria. Mast listed B. spinulosa var. collina and B. spinulosa var. neoanglica as sister clades in 1998, with B. spinulosa var. spinulosa and B. spinulosa var. cunninghamii flanking these. Alex George also reports that the taxon should be reviewed. A molecular study with specimens of each subspecies from the three mainland eastern states they occur would shed light on this matter.

=== Hybrids ===
Natural hybrids between B. s. var. spinulosa and B. ericifolia subsp. ericifolia have been recorded at Pigeon House Mountain in Morton National Park. Banksia "Giant Candles" was a chance garden hybrid between B. ericifolia and B. spinulosa var. cunninghamii.

== Distribution and habitat ==
The hairpin banksia occurs along the east coast of Australia from the Dandenong Ranges east of Melbourne, Victoria, north through New South Wales and into Queensland. It is common north to Maryborough, with disjunct populations occurring as far north as the Atherton Tableland near Cairns. It occurs in a variety of habitats, from coastal heath (spinulosa and collina) and elevated rocky slopes (neoanglica and spinulosa) to inland dry sclerophyll forest dominated by eucalypts, where they form part of the understorey. Plants in exposed areas are generally considerably shorter than those in sheltered areas. It usually occurs on sand, but can be found in rocky clays or loams.

Banksia spinulosa var. cunninghamii is found in three disjunct regions; the Dandenong Ranges east of Melbourne, East Gippsland between Lakes Entrance and Eden, and in the Great Dividing Range in a band from Jervis Bay to Glen Davis in Central New South Wales, while there have been collections northwards in the Dividing Range up into southeast Queensland. It can be an understorey plant under dense as well as open forest cover.

== Ecology ==
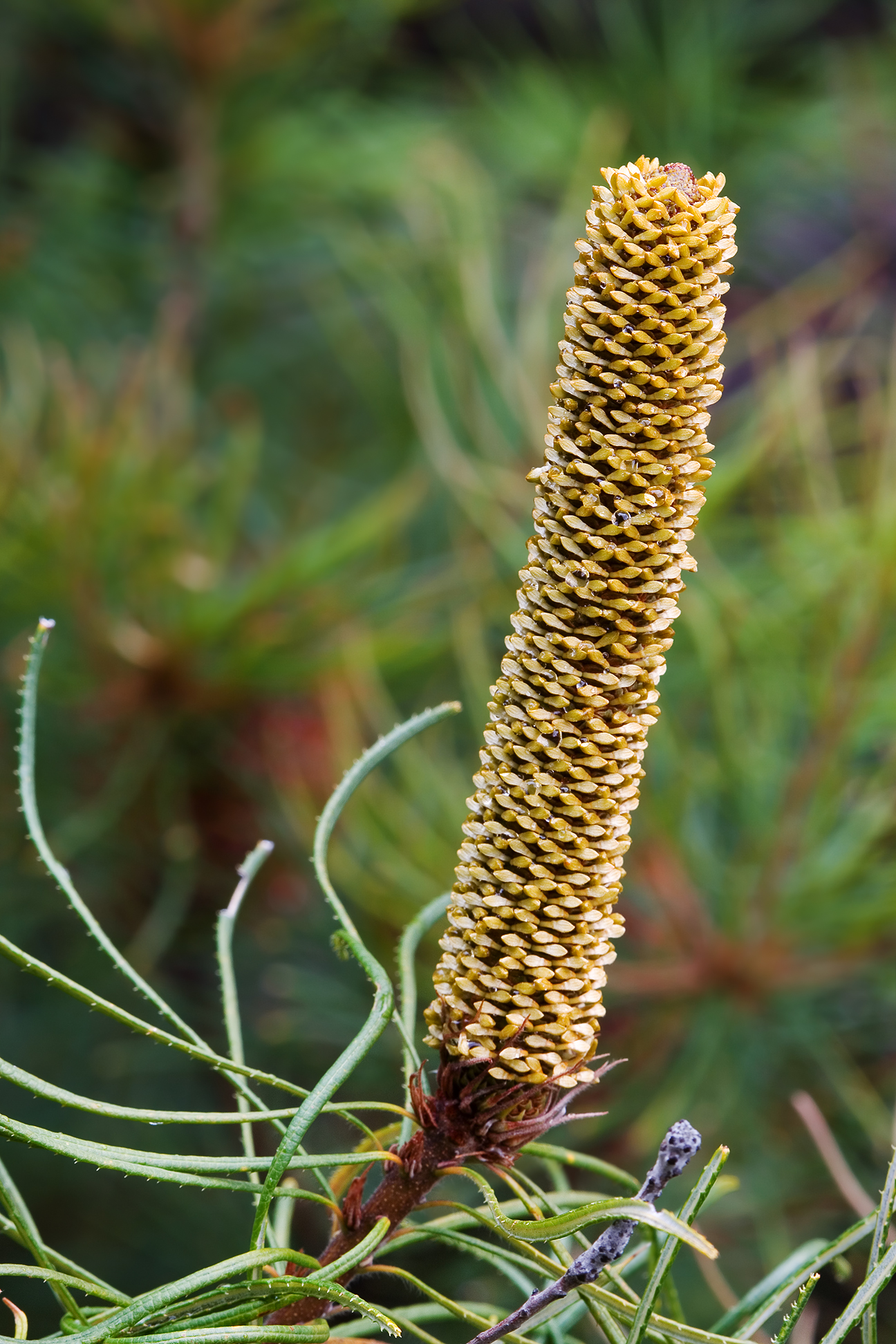
Immature spike

Like other banksias, Banksia spinulosa plays host to a wide variety of pollinators and is a vital source of nectar in autumn, when other flowers are scarce. Banksias have been the subject of many studies about their pollination; B. spinulosa is no exception. A 1998 study in Bungawalbin National Park in Northern New South Wales found that B. spinulosa var. collina inflorescences are foraged by a variety of small mammals, including marsupials such as Antechinus flavipes (yellow-footed antechinus), which carry pollen loads comparable to those of nectar-eating birds, making them effective pollinators. The same study noted that, unlike other banksias studied, B. spinulosa var. collina was visited predominantly by native bees rather than the introduced Apis mellifera (European honeybee).

A great many bird species have been observed visiting this species. A 1982 study in the New England National Park in northeastern New South Wales found that a large influx of Acanthorhynchus tenuirostris (eastern spinebill) coincided with the start of local B. spinulosa's flowering. In the Blackdown Tableland, Lichenostomus leucotis (white-eared honeyeater) and Lichenostomus melanops (yellow-tufted honeyeater) as well as pygmy possums visit B. spinulosa. Brown antechinus, sugar glider, and bush rat are also known to visit flowers. Additional species seen in The Banksia Atlas survey include Phylidonyris nigra (white-cheeked honeyeater), Phylidonyris pyrrhoptera (crescent honeyeater), Meliphaga lewinii (Lewin's honeyeater), Lichmera indistincta (brown honeyeater), Manorina melanocephala (noisy miner), Philemon corniculatus (noisy friarbird), Anthochaera carunculata (red wattlebird) and Eopsaltria australis (eastern yellow robin).

Like most other Proteaceae, B. spinulosa has proteoid roots, roots with dense clusters of short lateral rootlets that form a mat in the soil just below the leaf litter. These enhance solubilisation of nutrients, allowing nutrient uptake in low-nutrient soils such as the phosphorus-deficient native soils of Australia.

Banksia spinulosa does not appear to be under threat. It is resistant to Phytophthora cinnamomi dieback, which poses a major threat to many other Banksia species; and its wide distribution protects against the threat of habitat loss due to land clearing. As a result, it does not appear on the list of threatened flora of Australia under the Environment Protection and Biodiversity Conservation Act 1999.

Banksia spinulosa is listed in Part 1 Group 1 of Schedule 13 of the National Parks and Wildlife Act 1974; this means that as a common and secure species it is exempted from any licensing or tagging requirements under the 2002–2005 management plan to minimise and regulate the use of protected and threatened plants in the cut-flower industry in New South Wales.

== Cultivation ==
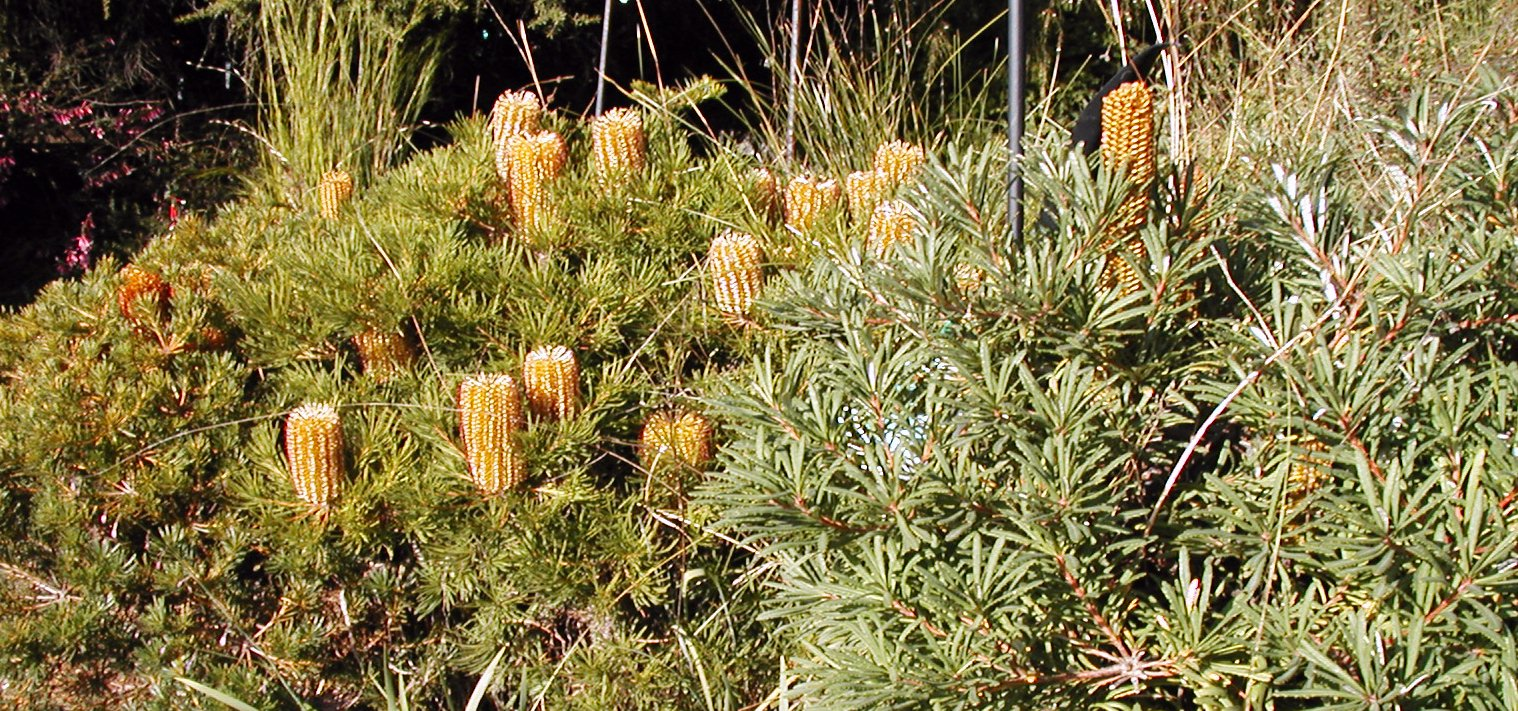
B. 'Birthday Candles' (L) and B. 'Stumpy Gold' (R), showing greyer foliage of latter, Kuranga Nursery

Banksia spinulosa var. spinulosa was introduced into cultivation in the United Kingdom in 1788 by Joseph Banks who supplied seed to Kew, Cambridge Botanic Gardens and Woburn Abbey among others; var. collina followed in 1800 and var. cunninghamii in 1822. It has proven a highly ornamental and bird-attracting plant in cultivation. Southern and montane provenance forms are frost hardy. In general, all forms prefer sandy, well-drained soils with sunny aspect, though some local forms hailing from Wianamatta shales may tolerate heavier soils. It is resistant to dieback, like most eastern banksias. As it grows naturally on acid soils, Banksia spinulosa is particularly sensitive to iron deficiency. Known as chlorosis, it manifests as yellowing of new leaves with preservation of green veins, and occurs when the plant is grown in soils of higher pH. This can also happen where soil contains quantities of cement, either as landfill or building foundations, and can be treated with iron chelate or sulfate.

Regular pruning is important to give the plant an attractive habit and prevent it from becoming leggy. As most cultivated forms of this species have a lignotuber, dormant buds exist below the bark that respond to pruning or fire, and hard-pruning is possible almost to ground level as a plant can readily sprout from old wood. This is not the case for var. cunninghamii which should not be pruned below foliage. Flowering may take up to eight years from germination; buying an advanced plant may hasten this process, as will getting a cutting-grown plant. Banksia spinulosa can be propagated easily by seed, and is one of the (relatively) easier banksias to propagate by cutting. Named cultivars are by necessity propagated by cuttings as this ensures that the plant produced bears the same attributes as the original plant.

Both B. s. var. collina and var. spinulosa are commonly seen in nurseries; given that the varieties can hybridise, attempting to find a local provenance form from a local community nursery, Bushcare or Australian Plants Society group is preferable environmentally if they are intended for planting in gardens near bushland where native populations occur. There are some dwarf forms available for the city gardener – 'Stumpy Gold' is a form of variety collina originally from the Central Coast, while 'Birthday Candles', 'Coastal Cushion' and 'Golden Cascade' are forms of variety spinulosa from the South Coast of New South Wales.

=== Cultivars ===
There are a number of commercial varieties available from Australian retail nurseries, four have been registered under plant breeders' rights legislation, and another with the Australian Cultivar Registration Authority. The lack of official names has led to some varieties bearing several different names.

- B. s. var. collina 'Carnarvon Gold' is an all-gold flowered form from Carnarvon Gorge in central Queensland with long leaves and revolute margins which grows to around 2–5 m (6.6–16.4 ft) in height and 2–4 m (6.6–13.1 ft) across. The old flowers fall from the spikes.
- B. s. var. collina 'Stumpy Gold' is a spreading form (40 centimetres or 16 inches high by up to 1.2 metres or 3.9 feet across) with light gold flowers 15 centimetres (6 in) high by 6 centimetres (2 in) across from the vicinity of Catherine Hill Bay on the New South Wales Central Coast, propagated by Richard Anderson of Merricks Nursery. It arises from a silty loam so theoretically should tolerate a heavier soil than 'Coastal Cushion'. Leaves are a more subdued green with greyish tinge than the south coast NSW spinulosa cultivars.
- B. s. var. spinulosa 'Birthday Candles', the original trailblazer, is a compact plant growing to 45 centimetres (18 in) tall and up to 1 metre (3 ft) across with red-styled gold flowers 15 cm high by 6 cm across. The leaves are narrow with attractive lime green new growth. Stems and branches naturally crooked. It was granted PBR status in 1989, after an application by Bill Molyneux of Austraflora Pty Ltd. The provenance of the original material was an exposed headland near Ulladulla on the New South Wales South Coast. It appears to fare better in Mediterranean climates with reports of patchy performance in Sydney (though better in pots) and unreliability in Brisbane. There are reports of it flowering in alternate years only. It is reported to be an unreliable survivor, although this may be due to it being popular among novices.

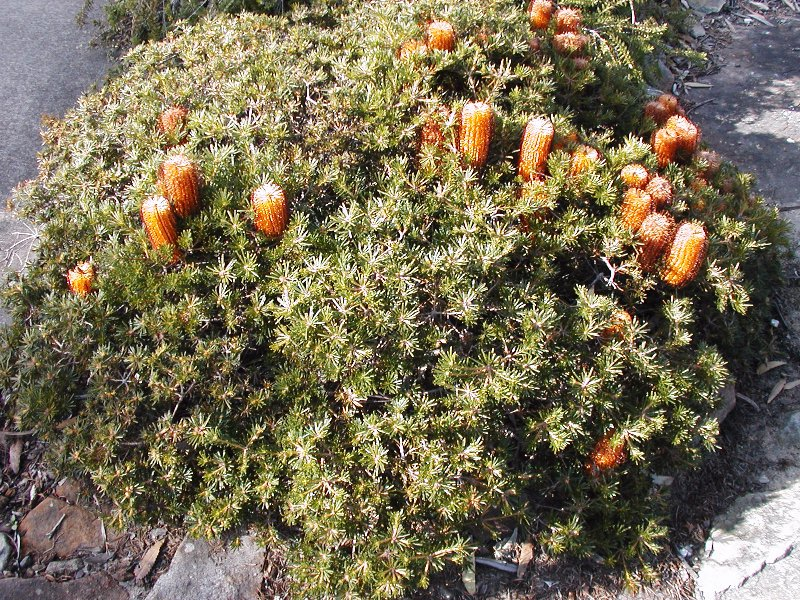
Banksia spinulosa, 'Coastal Cushion' in Kenthurst

- B. s. var. spinulosa 'Cherry Candles', bred by Bill Molyneux from the 'Birthday Candles' cultivar, is a compact plant growing to 45 cm (18 in) tall and up to 100 cm across with cherry red-styled gold flowers, darker than its parent, 15 cm high by 6 cm across. It was released commercially in spring 2004, and granted PBR status in February 2005, after an application by Molyneux.
- B. s. var. spinulosa 'Coastal Cushion' (= 'Schnapper Point') was originally collected by Neil Marriott and called 'Schnapper Point' from the same locality as 'Birthday Candles'. This is a more spreading plant to 50 cm (20 in) tall and up to 1.5–2 m across with dark red-styled gold flowers (a couple of shades darker than 'Birthday Candles') 15 cm high by 6 cm across. It is propagated by Richard Anderson of Merricks Nursery. It appears to be more adaptable to points north than other dwarf forms – growing reliably in southeastern Queensland. This form can be very floriferous, with some plants sporting more than 40 inflorescences at any one time.
- B. s. 'Coastal Candles', propagated by Merv Hodge, came from Philip Vaughan's 'Schnapper Point' plant. Some plants are behaving differently, so it may be that not all material is exactly the same clone.

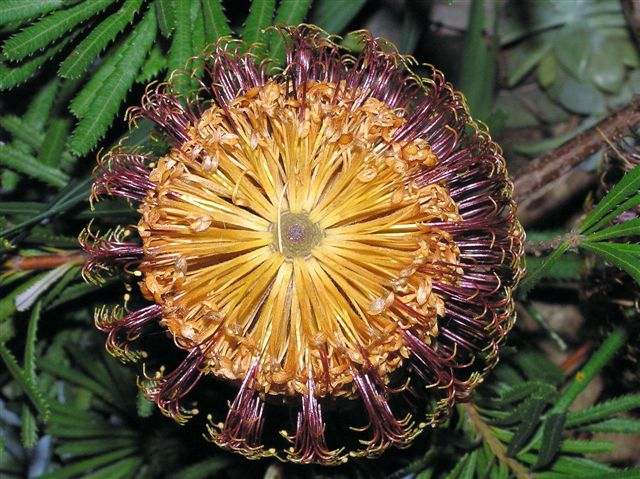
Banksia spinulosa 'Honey Pots'

- B. s. var. spinulosa 'Golden Cascade' is yet another plant from the same locality as 'Birthday Candles'; this is more spreading again, to perhaps 30 cm tall and up to 1.5–2 m across with red-styled gold flowers 15 cm high by 6 cm across. It is also seen as B. spinulosa 'prostrate'. Propagated by Gondwana Nursery, this is a relatively new release.
- B. s. var. spinulosa 'Honey Pots' is a form with all gold flowers to 20 cm (8 in) high (taller than forms listed above), however it is a little larger with reports of it growing to 1 m high, with odd reports of it getting taller than this, by 1.2 m across. It comes from south coast in Victoria, propagated by Rod Parsons of Carawah Nursery in Victoria.

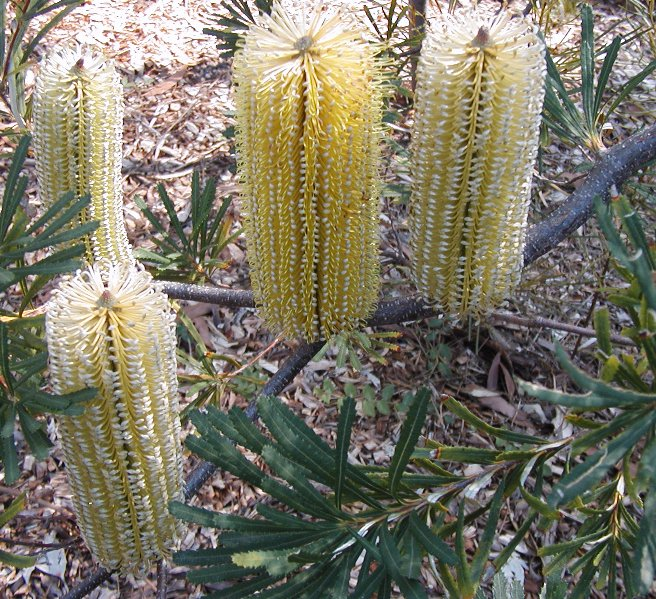
Banksia spinulosa var, cunninghamii 'Lemon glow' in Illawarra Grevillea Park, Bulli

- B. s. var. spinulosa (dwarf forms) – Rod Parsons of Carawah Nursery in Victoria has two red-styled fairly compact dwarf forms, one (all serrated – slow-growing, possibly collina) growing to 1 m, the (leaf ends serrated only, faster-growing) other 1.5 m – and there are others reported but not named.
- B. s. var. cunninghamii 'Lemon Glow' was registered with ACRA in 1982 by Alf Salkin and hails from French Island in Victoria, growing 2–3 m (6.6–9.8 ft) with all lemon yellow flowers. Currently propagated by Phillip Vaughan and Kuranga Nursery, both in Melbourne. It is reported to be frost hardy and moderately resistant to drought.
- There is a form sold as a Banksia (spinulosa) cunninghamii variant, propagated by Bournda Plants of Tura Beach on the NSW south coast. The plants reach 70 cm (28 in) after four years and have black-styled gold inflorescences. The form came from David Shiels of Wakiti Nursery in Victoria, who got it from Alf Salkin. It has a white underside (not brownish) and has a couple of serrations close to the tip of the leaf, typical of B. s. var. spinulosa.
