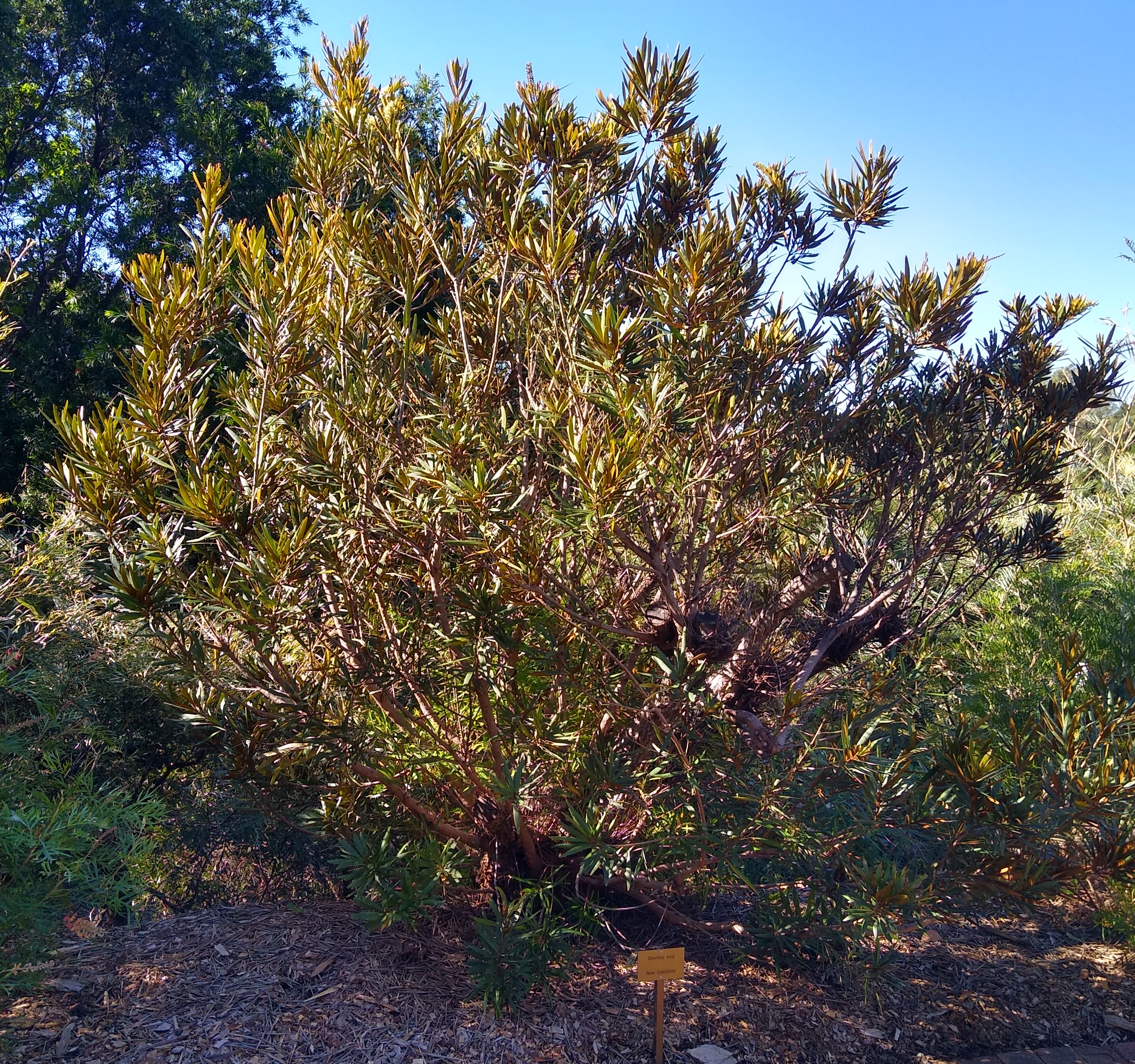
- At the Illawarra Grevillea Park in Bulli, New South Wales, Australia

Conservation status
- Least Concern (IUCN 3.1)

Scientific classification
- Kingdom: Plantae
- Clade: Embryophytes
- Clade: Tracheophytes
- Clade: Angiosperms
- Clade: Eudicots
- Order: Proteales
- Family: Proteaceae
- Genus: Grevillea
- Species: G. exul

Binomial name
- Grevillea exul Lindl.

Synonyms
- Grevillea heterochroma Brongn.; Grevillea macrostachya Brongn. & Gris; Hakea exul (Lindl.) Christenh. & Byng

= Grevillea exul =

Species of shrub endemic to New Caledonia

Grevillea exul, also known as common toothbrush, is a species of flowering plant in the family Proteaceae, endemic to New Caledonia. It is a shrub or tree with white flowers which grows up to 4–10 metres (13–33 ft) tall. Like all other grevillea species of New Caledonia, it is a manganese accumulator.

== Description ==
Grevillea exul is a shrub or small tree, growing as an open tree up to 10 m (33 ft) tall in sheltered areas and as a spreading shrub up to 4 m (13.1234 ft) in open areas. The leaves are 4.5–13.5 cm (1.8–5.3 in) long, 0.5–5.7 cm (0.20–2.24 in) wide, lanceolate to elliptic in shape, conspicuously veined and have a blunt apex.

The flowers are white with the style end greenish, arranged terminally on an inflorescence 5–20 cm (2.0–7.9 in) long. The perianth is 10–15 mm long, 2–3mm wide and slightly dilated at the base, the anthers enclosing the style end prior to anthesis and separating afterwards. The pistil is 26.5–42.5 mm (1.04–1.67 in) long with a slightly oblique, elliptical conical pollen presenter. Flowering occurs from May to January, during the later months in higher altitudes. The fruit is a follicle 12–20 mm (0.47–0.79 in) long and 9–15 mm (0.35–0.59 in) wide.

=== Similar species ===
Grevillea exul is similar in appearance to G. rubiginosa, macmillanii and sinuata, all three of which being closely related. The leaf and flower morphology, coupled with the species distribution can be used to identify each species. The inflorescence axis and outer surface of the tepals are pale pubescent in G. exul and macmillianii, glabrous in sinuata and covered with red hairs in rubiginosa. The leaves are narrow and needle-like in macmillanii, broad and leathery with a red indumentum on the lower surface in rubiginosa and elliptic in exul.

Grevillea exul is the most widespread of the group, being distributed across the entire New Caledonian Grande Terre with an estimated extent of occurrence being 12,620 km^{2} (4,870 sq mi). G. macmillanii only occurs in the Thio commune and surrounds, rubiginosa only occurs on the southern half of the island and sinuata is known only from the Kouaoua region. The distribution of the four species is largely non-overlapping, though exul and rubiginosa both occur in the Dumbéa valley.

== Taxonomy ==
The species was described in 1851 by John Lindley in the Journal of the Horticultural Society London. The specific epithet exul derives from a Latin word meaning 'an exile', referring to the fact that it was the only described New Caledonian grevillea species at the time, occurring over 1500km away from all other species.

A taxonomic revision published by Phytotaxa in 2020 elevated three former subspecies of Grevillea exul to full species status based on their morphological differences and mostly separated distributions. The new species are G. macmillanii, G. rubuginosa, and G. sinuata.

== Distribution and habitat ==
Grevillea exul is widely distributed across New Caledonia, occurring in valleys, ridges and slopes 6–1,250 metres (20–4,101 ft) above sea level. It grows in a variety of soils from serpentine schist and skeletal soil to alluvial sand in open forest or scrub.

== Conservation status ==
Grevillea exul is regarded as least concern on the IUCN Red List of Threatened Species. Although some subpopulations may be impacted by mining activities and uncontrolled wildfires, the species is common and tends to be a pioneer species which is resilient to natural disturbances such as bushfires. It is not protected by legislation in New Caledonia but it occurs in many protected areas including Côte Oubliée Natural Park, Saille Forest, Montagne des Sources and Mont Humboldt.

== Cultivation ==
Grevillea exul was cultivated at the Royal Botanic Gardens in Sydney from 1850 until at least 1903, where it fell out of cultivation early in the 20th century. In 1988, gardens staff recollected the species, re-establishing it in cultivation and sharing material with the Grevillea Study Group of the Australian Native Plants Society. Today, it is now grown at a variety of botanical gardens across Australia, including the Brisbane Botanic Gardens and the Royal Botanic Gardens Victoria's Southwest Pacific Island collection.

It is a hardy and adaptable species, able to grow in a wide variety of climatic conditions from tropical climates to cold, wet winters. It can withstand frost of 2 °C (36 °F) and can withstand dry periods with little adverse effects. Plants which are grown on their own roots appear to grow as well as those grafted onto a rootstock, usually from Grevillea robusta. It is a long-lived plant that flowers vigorously in season and may be used as an ornamental shrub.
