= Banksia 'Stumpy Gold' =

Cultivar of Banksia spinulosa

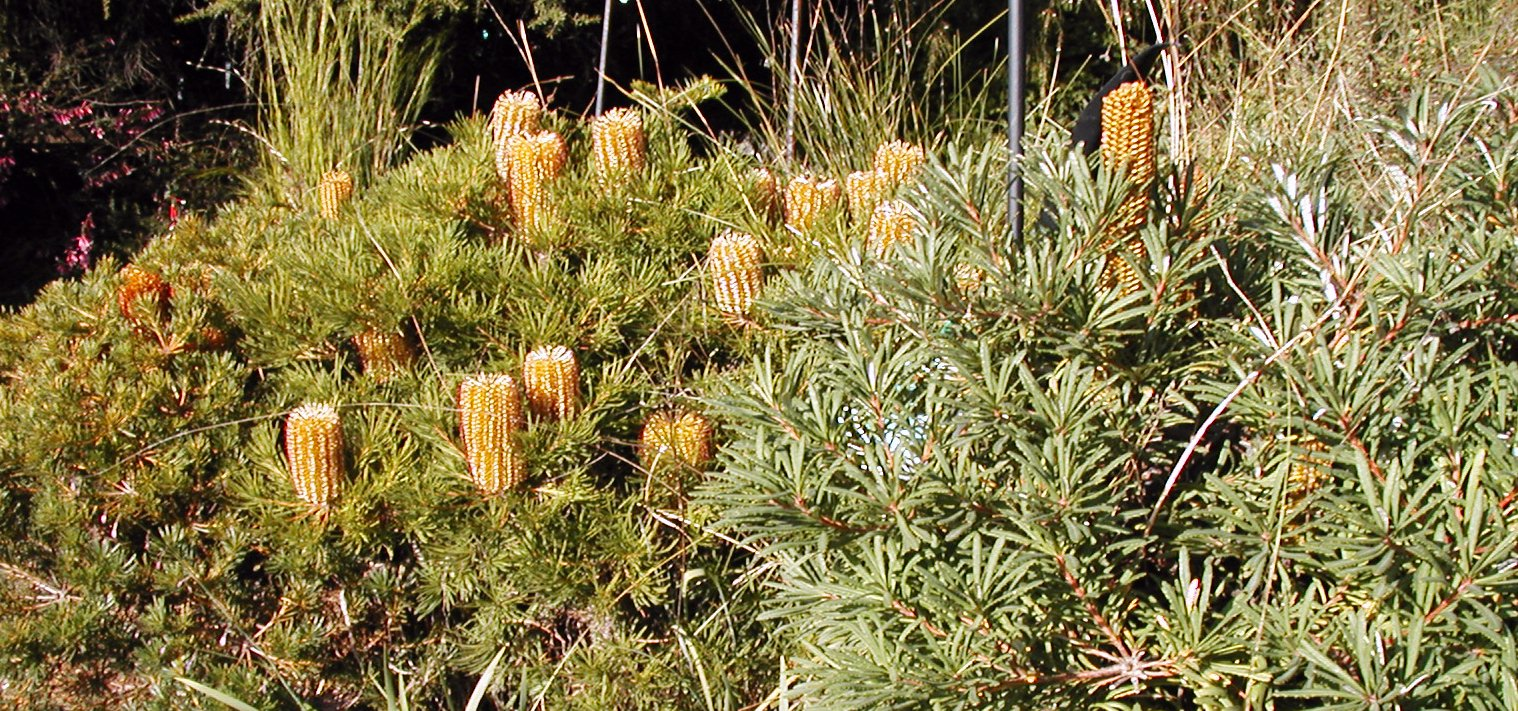
- B. 'Birthday Candles' (left) and B. 'Stumpy Gold' (right)
- Species: B. spinulosa var. collina
- Cultivar: 'Stumpy Gold'
- Origin: Richard Anderson, Merricks, Victoria

Banksia 'Stumpy Gold' is a dwarf cultivar of Banksia spinulosa var. collina that was selected by Richard Anderson of Merricks Nursery in Victoria from material collected at Catherine Hill Bay on the New South Wales Central Coast. It is a stunted shrub growing to 50 cm tall and wide and has all gold inflorescences which appear in autumn. Its foliage is noticeably greyer than the similarly sized and much better known and more widely grown Banksia 'Birthday Candles', which has reddish-styled golden blooms rather than all gold.
