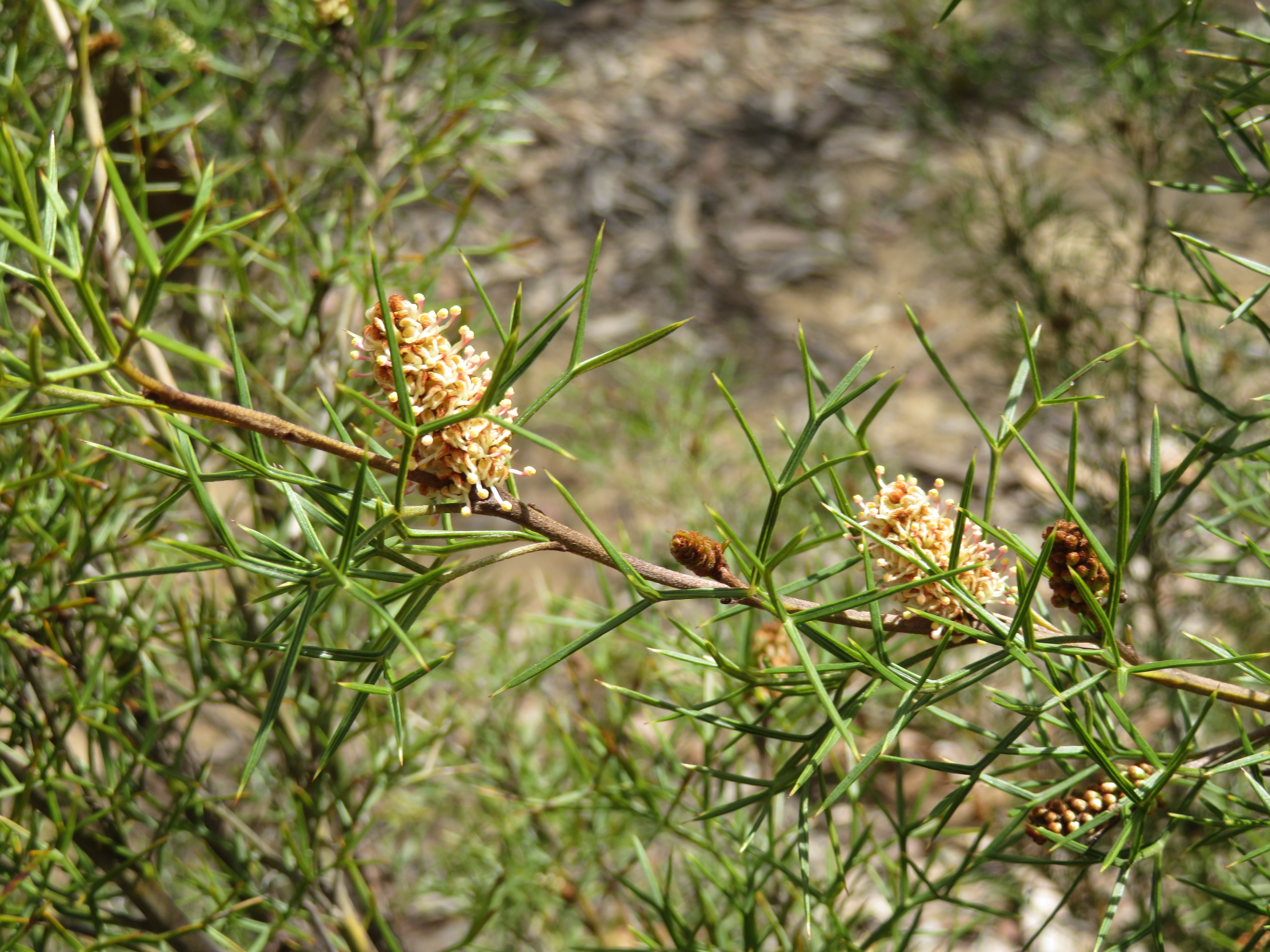
- Grevillea raybrownii on the Box Vale track near Welby

Conservation status
- Vulnerable (IUCN 3.1)

- Vulnerable (EPBC Act)

Scientific classification
- Kingdom: Plantae
- Clade: Tracheophytes
- Clade: Angiosperms
- Clade: Eudicots
- Order: Proteales
- Family: Proteaceae
- Genus: Grevillea
- Species: G. raybrownii

Binomial name
- Grevillea raybrownii Olde & Marriott

= Grevillea raybrownii =

Species of shrub endemic to Australia

Grevillea raybrownii is a flowering shrub in the family Proteaceae and is endemic to New South Wales. It has divided, pointed leaves and dense clusters of white flowers usually at the end of branches.

== Description ==
Grevillea raybrownii is a straggling shrub growing to 1.5 m (4 ft 11 in) tall. The leaves are linear and divide into 3-5 narrow lobes 2.5–5 cm (0.98–1.97 in) long on slightly intersecting branchlets that are smooth and rusty coloured when young. The lobes are spreading, sharply pointed, 0.5–2.4 cm (0.20–0.94 in) long and 0.6–1.2 mm (0.024–0.047 in) wide. The leaf upper surface is smooth and the underside has two grooves. The inflorescence is a dense cluster of about 40 flowers up to 2 cm (0.79 in) long, 1.5 cm (0.59 in) at the base, brownish coloured when in bud on a peduncle about 1 m (3 ft 3 in) long, at the end of branches or in the leaf axils. The perianth is white with a brownish limb, the inside is smooth and the outside covered in flattened dense silky hairs. The pistil is 6–7.5 mm (0.24–0.30 in) long and the style smooth. Flowering occurs in spring and the dry fruit is about 12 mm (0.47 in) long and densely covered in silky hairs.

== Taxonomy and naming ==
Grevillea raybrownii was first formally described in 1994 by Peter Olde and Neil Marriott and the description was published in Telopea. The specific epithet (raybrownii) is in honour of Ray Brown for his contribution to the horticulture of the genus Grevillea and the establishment of the Illawarra Grevillea Park Botanical Garden in Bulli.

== Distribution and habitat ==
This species has a restricted distribution, it grows in sandy, gravelly loams in dry sclerophyll forest, mostly on ridge tops, occasionally on slopes, between Dapto, Robertson and Berrima in New South Wales.

== Conservation status ==
Grevillea raybrownii is listed as "vulnerable" on the IUCN Red List of Threatened Species, the Environment Protection and Biodiversity Conservation Act 1999 List of Threatened Flora and under the New South Wales Government Biodiversity Conservation Act 2016.
