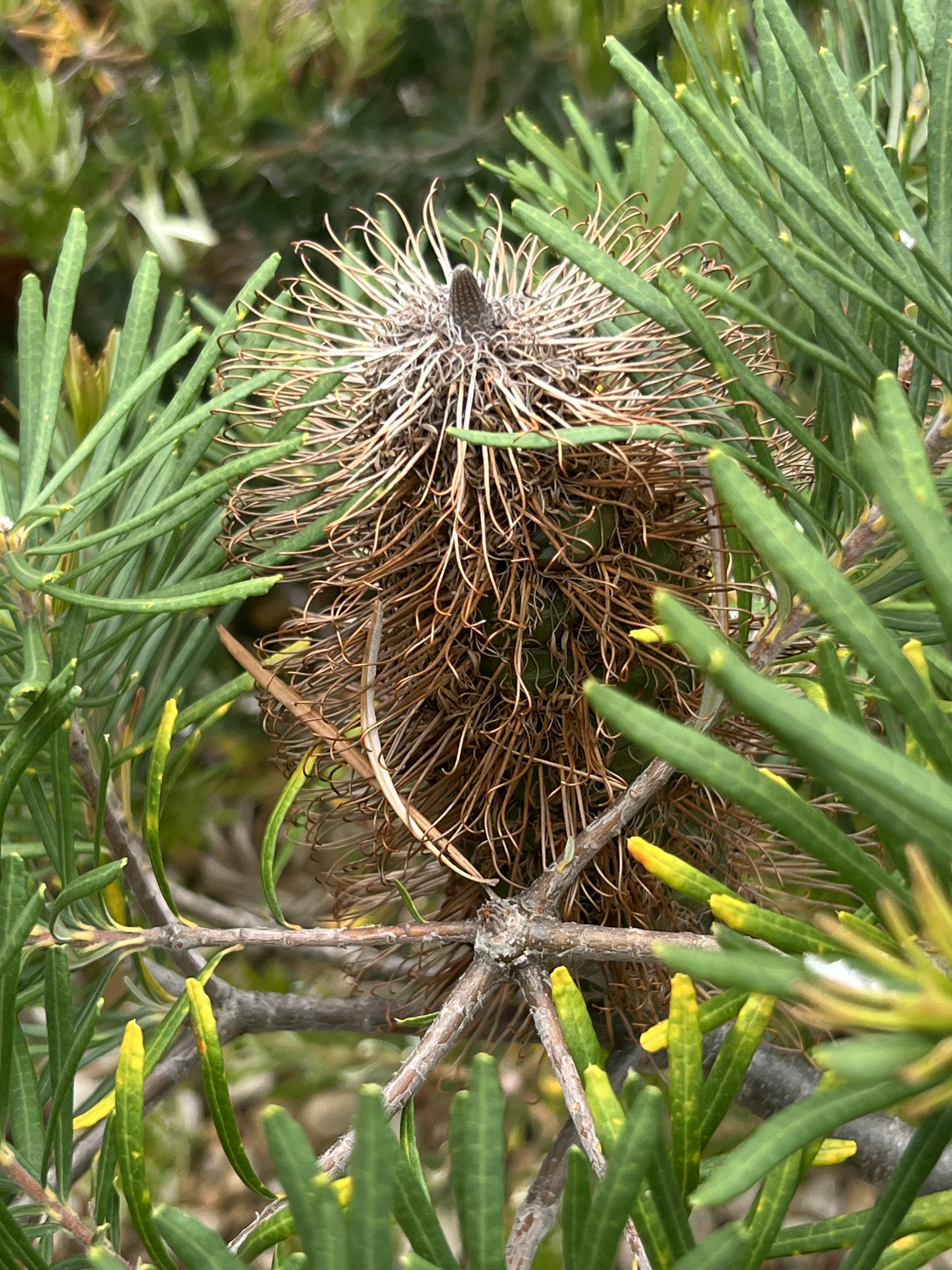

Conservation status
- Critically endangered (EPBC Act)

Scientific classification
- Kingdom: Plantae
- Clade: Tracheophytes
- Clade: Angiosperms
- Clade: Eudicots
- Order: Proteales
- Family: Proteaceae
- Genus: Banksia
- Species: B. vincentia

Binomial name
- Banksia vincentia Stimpson & P.H.Weston

= Banksia vincentia =

Species of shrub native to eastern Australia

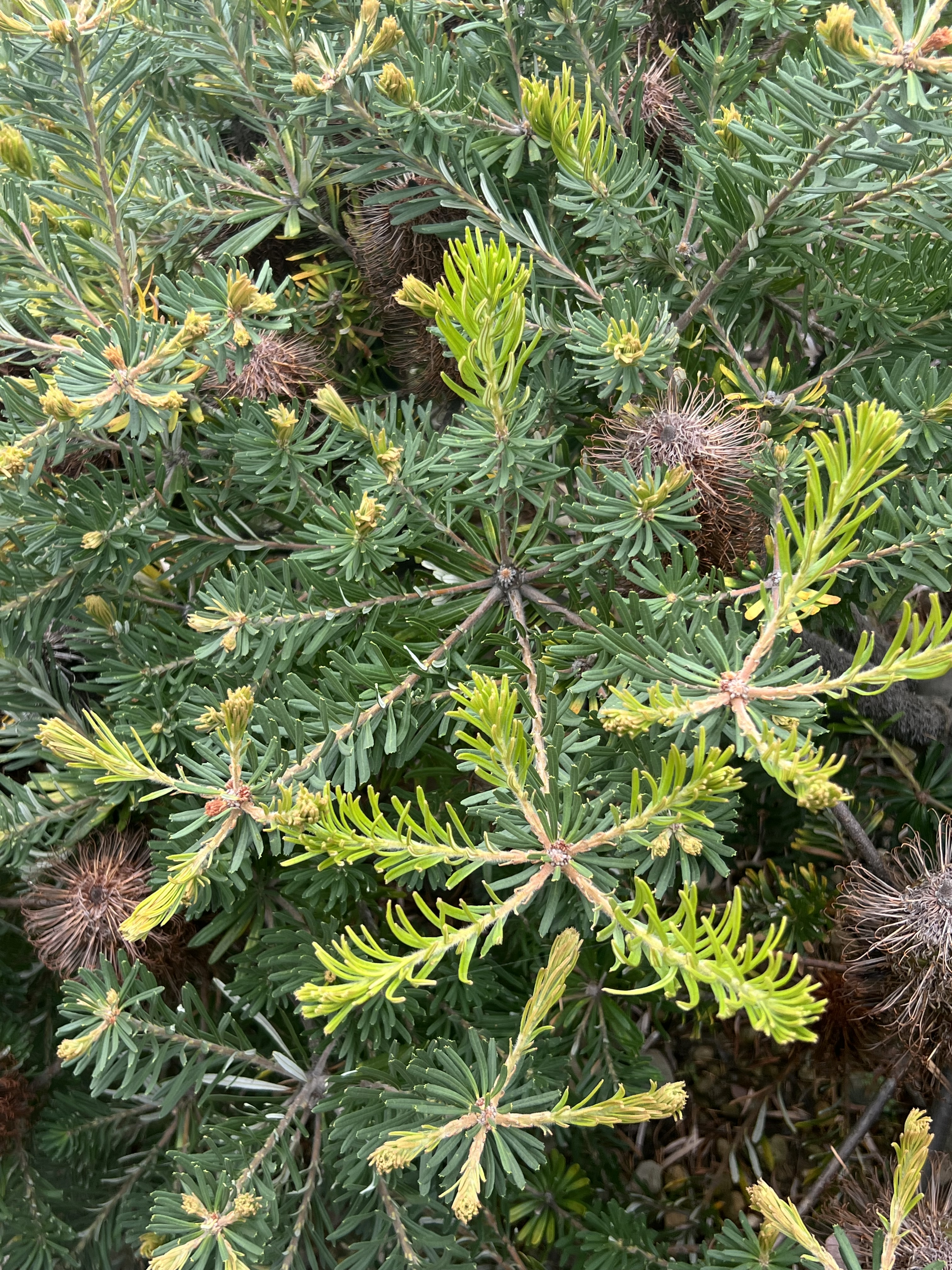
Foliage

Banksia vincentia is a shrub that grows in a small location in southern New South Wales. It belongs to the Banksia spinulosa species complex and has affinities to Banksia neoanglica, found several hundred kilometres to the north.

B. vincentia was described by Marge Stimpson and Peter Weston in 2014, having been initially discovered in 2008. Local nursery owner Jacki Koppman came across the plant and suspected it was a distinct species, sending material to the New South Wales Herbarium for assessment and identification.

== Description ==
Banksia vincentia has a semi-prostrate habit, growing as a squat, spreading shrub 30–75 cm (12–30 in) high by 1–2 m (3 ft 3 in – 6 ft 7 in) wide, with branches growing horizontally from a lignotuber for 20–30 cm before veering upwards.

Leaves are either entire or have 1–6 marginal teeth or undulations in distil parts and grow to 12–47 mm (0.5–1.9 in) long and 2–6.5 mm wide. They are narrowly oblong-obovate with leaf tips being rounded to truncate. Leaf margins are slightly recurved and densely covered in short hairs. The petiole of the leaves are 1–3.5 mm long and moderately to densely covered in hair.

== Conservation ==
Banksia vincentia is known from a single population of plants—14 at time of discovery and now down to 12 individual shrubs. Some of the threats faced by the plant include: impact of road maintenance on highly restricted population, degradation of habitats from increasing urbanization, poor knowledge of the species' distribution and potential abundance, habitat invasion by weeds and invasive grasses, and the presence of Phytophthora cinnamomi which is suspected to have killed several individuals.

Conservation has involved storing and germinating seed as well as cultivating new plants from cuttings at the Australian Botanic Gardens in Canberra, and Wollongong Botanic Gardens. Material has been sent to the Kew Royal Botanic Gardens in England as well.

As of February 2018 it is listed as "critically endangered" under the EPBC Act.
