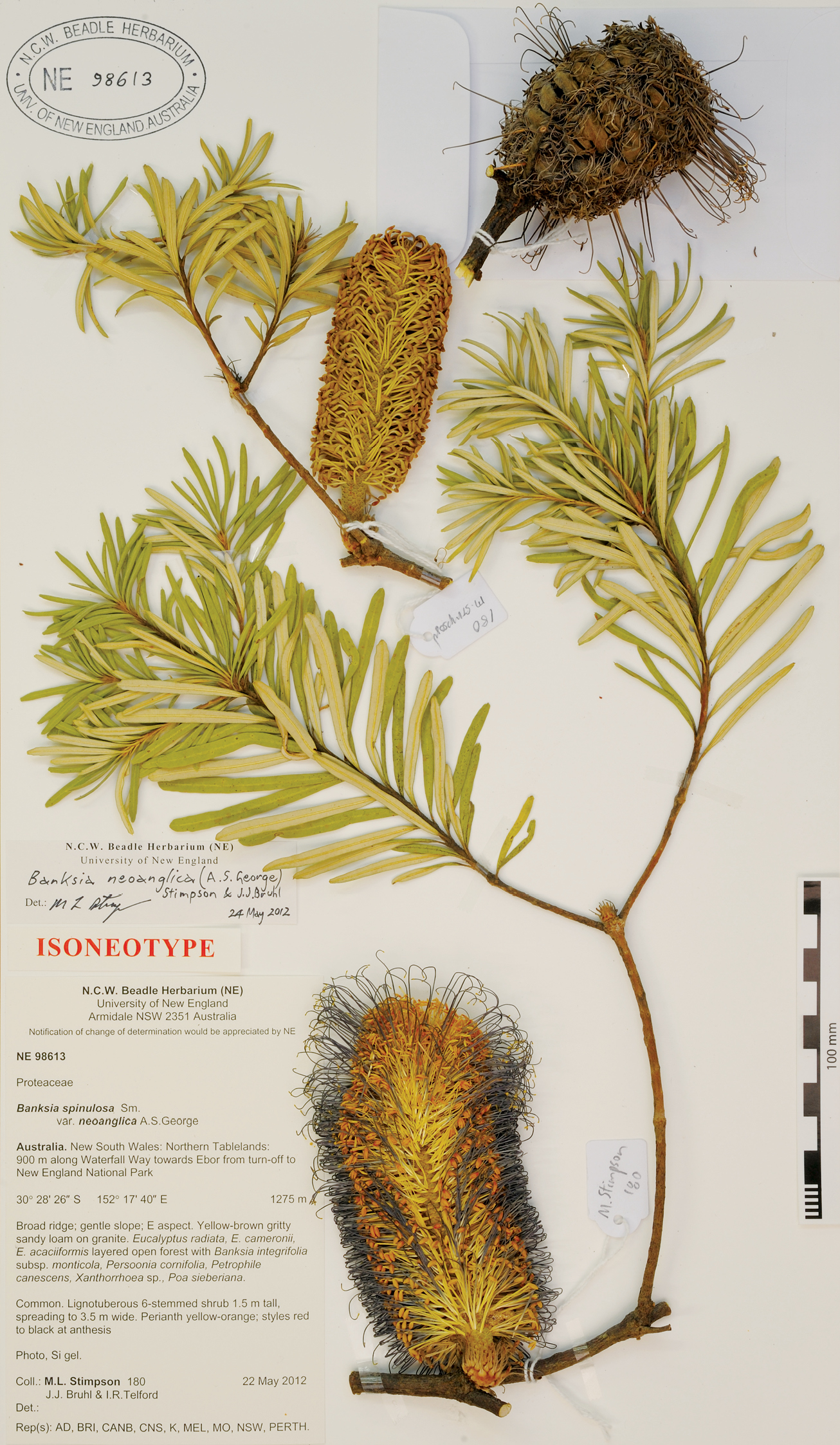
- New England banksia neotype

Scientific classification
- Kingdom: Plantae
- Clade: Embryophytes
- Clade: Tracheophytes
- Clade: Spermatophytes
- Clade: Angiosperms
- Clade: Eudicots
- Order: Proteales
- Family: Proteaceae
- Genus: Banksia
- Species: B. neoanglica

Binomial name
- Banksia neoanglica (A.S.George) Stimpson & J.J.Bruhl

Synonyms
- Banksia spinulosa var. neoanglica A.S.George

= Banksia neoanglica =

New England banksia

Species of shrub native to eastern Australia

Banksia neoanglica, commonly known as New England banksia, is a shrub or small tree with leaves that are greenish on the upper surface, whitish with soft hairs on the lower side and spikes of flowers with styles that turn black as they open. It is similar to Banksia spinulosa and was formerly known as Banksia spinulosa var. neoanglica, but differs in that its leaves are wider and have margins that are not tightly turned under. It is found mainly along the eastern edge of the Great Dividing Range in Australia.

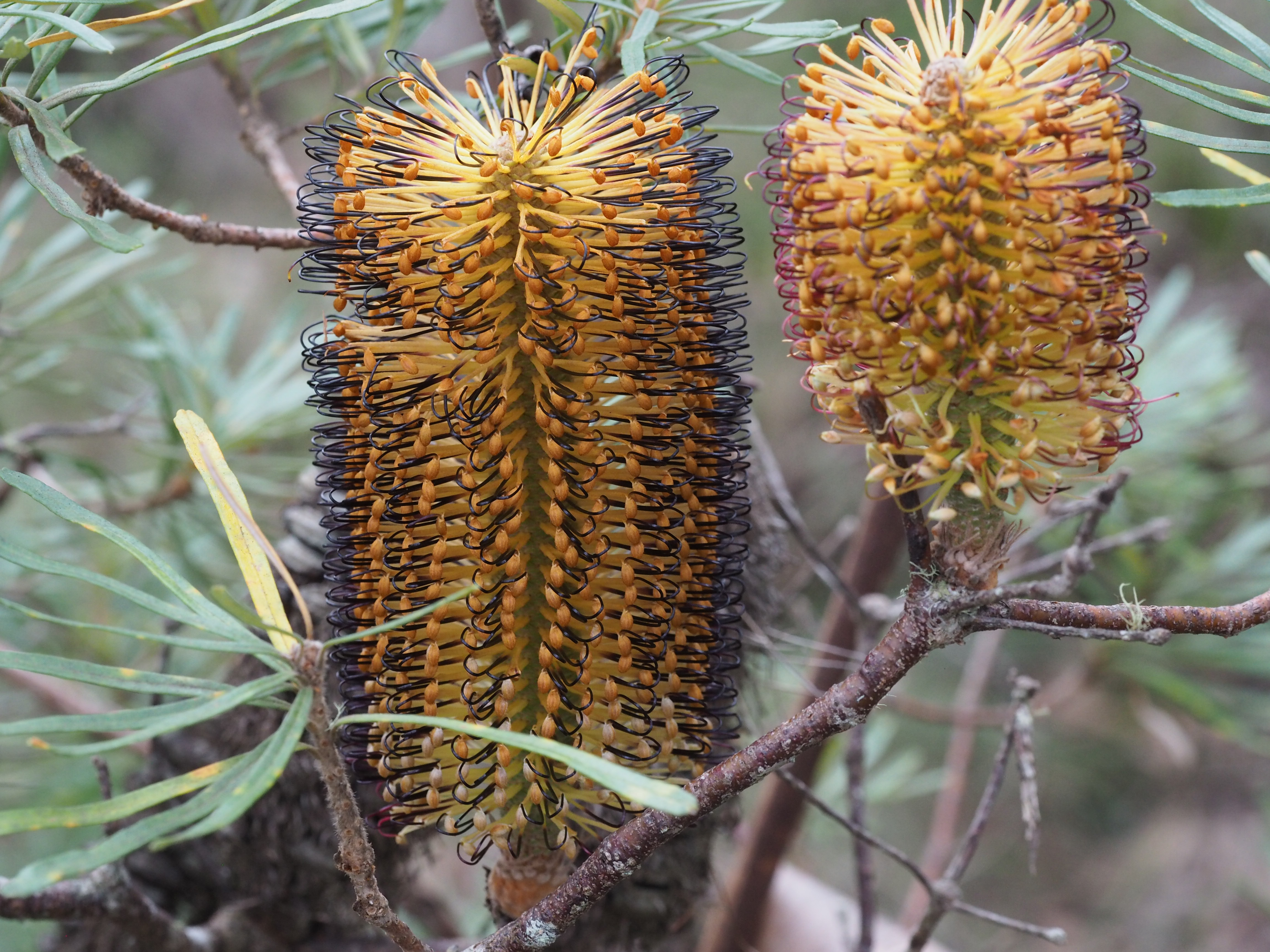
Banksia neoanglica flowers

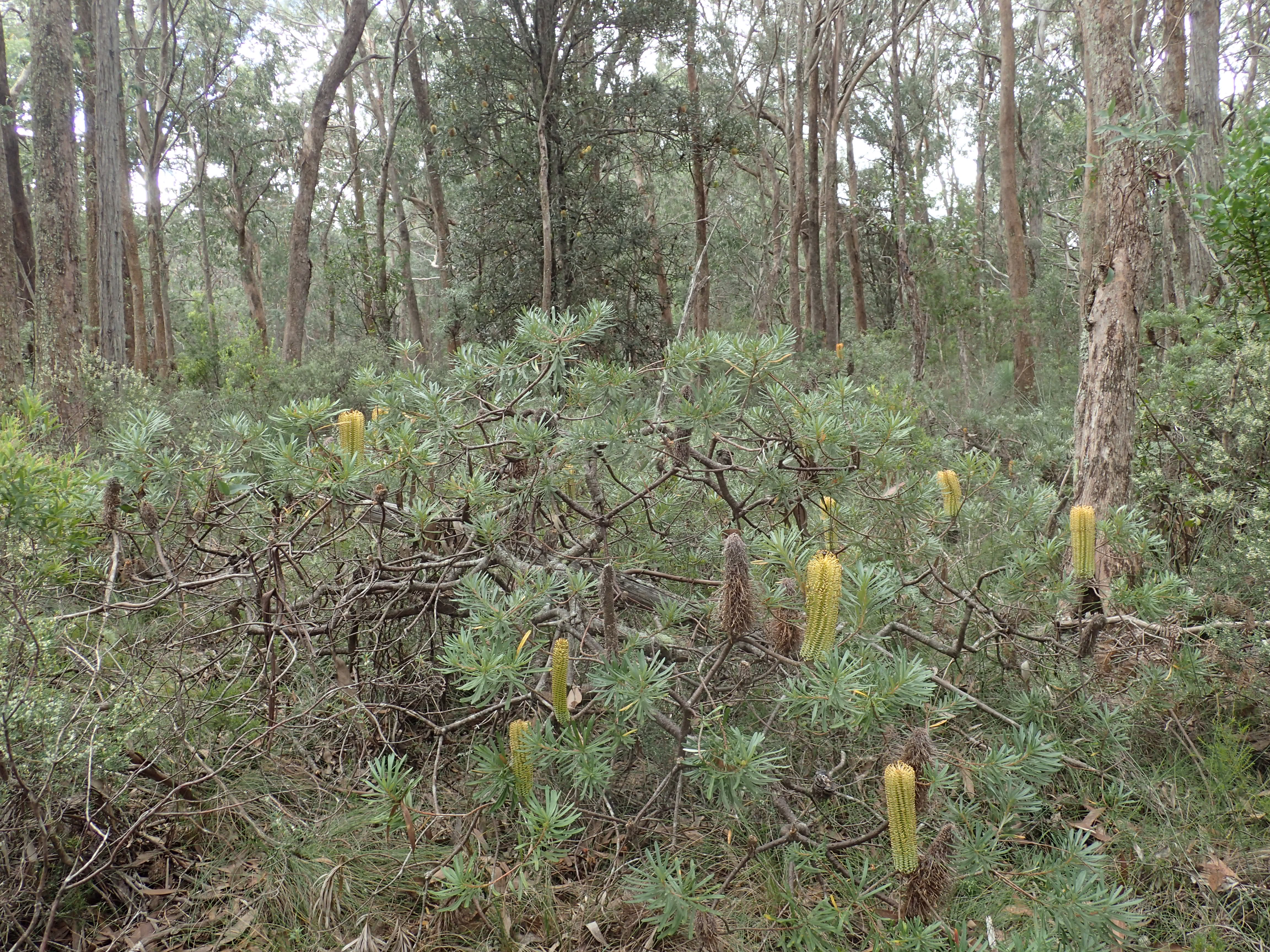
Banksia neoanglica habit at the type location

== Description ==
Banksia neoanglica is sometimes a multi-stemmed shrub with an underground lignotuber and growing to a height of 2.5 m (8 ft), otherwise a tree to 7 m (20 ft). The adult leaves have a petiole about 2–4 mm (0.08–0.2 in) long and a linear leaf blade 43–75 mm (2–3 in) long and 3–5 mm (0.1–0.2 in) wide. Immature leaves are wider but shorter and have teeth along their edges. The upper surface of the leaves is glabrous but the lower side is covered with a layer of greyish-white felted hairs. The mature flower spike is 84–119 mm (3–5 in) long and 70–85 mm (3–3 in) wide with 12 to 14 pairs of flowers around the circumference. When mature, the flowers are yellowish-orange but the style, which has a hooked end, changes colour from red to black at anthesis. The group of fruit (infructescence) that develops from the fertilised flowers is 85–120 mm (3–5 in) long and 35–45 mm (1–2 in) in diameter. Flowering mostly occurs from April to June.

This species is similar to hairpin banksia (B. spinulosa) but differs in having leaves with flat edges. It also resembles Banksia cunninghamii (also known as B. spinulosa var. cunninghamii) but has a shorter, wider infructescence and a lignotuber, absent from B. cunninghamii.

== Taxonomy ==
During collection for The Banksia Atlas project prior to 1988, volunteer collectors reported populations of B. spinulosa in northern New South Wales that were indistinguishable from B. spinulosa var. cunninghamii by their leaves, flowers and fruit, but unlike that variety in that it had a lignotuber. In 1988, Alex George formally described B. spinulosa var. neoanglica and published the description in Nuytsia from a specimen collected on 6 April 1986 by Stephen Clemesha on the Ebor-Armidale Road, about a kilometre north of the turnoff to New England National Park. (Apparently no specimens were distributed to herbaria, so that a neotype was collected in 2012.) The specific epithet (neoanglica) refers to the New England Tableland, the centre of the distribution. At the time of publication, B. spinulosa comprised four varieties: spinulosa, neoanglica, collina and cunninghamii. (The last two varieties had previously been known as Banksia species.) Under George's arrangement of Banksia, B. spinulosa was placed in subgenus Banksia, section Oncostylis, series Spicigerae because its inflorescences are cylindrical.

In 2012, Margaret Stimpson and Jeremy Bruhl raised the variety to species level and described Banksia neoanglica in the journal PhytoKeys. They examined 23 characteristics of 89 specimens of plants in the species known as Banksia spinulosa at that time and proposed recognising B. spinulosa var. cunninghamii and B. spinulosa var. neoanglica as species.

In 1996, Kevin Thiele and Pauline Ladiges published a new arrangement for the genus, after cladistic analyses yielded a cladogram significantly different from George's arrangement. Thiele and Ladiges' arrangement retained B. spinulosa var. neoanglica as a distinct taxon, placing it between B. spinulosa var. collina and B. spinulosa var. cunninghamii. They also retained B. spinulosa in series Spicigerae, but placed the species alone in B. subser. Spinulosae. This arrangement stood until 1999, when George effectively reverted to his 1981 arrangement in his monograph for the Flora of Australia series.

Since 1998, Austin Mast has been publishing results of ongoing cladistic analyses of DNA sequence data for the subtribe Banksiinae. His analyses suggest a phylogeny that is greatly different from George's arrangement. George's and Thiele and Ladiges' positioning of B. spinulosa var. neoanglica within B. spinulosa is supported, but B. spinulosa's placement is not. Series Spicigerae appears to be polyphyletic, with B. spinulosa and B. ericifolia more closely related to the taxa in Series Salicinae than they are to the other members of series Spicigerae. Early in 2007, Mast and Thiele initiated a rearrangement of Banksia by merging Dryandra into it, and publishing B. subg. Spathulatae for the species having spoon-shaped cotyledons. They foreshadowed publishing a full arrangement once DNA sampling of Dryandra was complete; in the meantime, if Mast and Thiele's nomenclatural changes are taken as an interim arrangement, then B. neoanglica is placed in B. subg. Spathulatae.

Banksia neoanglica is closely related genetically to the critically endangered Banksia vincentia.

== Distribution and habitat ==
Banksia neoanglica occurs on the McPherson Range in southern Queensland, along the eastern edge of the New England Tableland and as far south as Hanging Rock in New South Wales. It grows in sandy soil in woodland, forest and heath, often with white mountain banksia (B. integrifolia subsp. monticola).

== Ecology ==
New England banksia occurs in two distinct forms. It is commonly a shrub with up to ten stems and an underground lignotuber but sometimes a single-stemmed small tree with a lignotuberous swelling just above or just below soil level. The former occurs in areas that are prone to bushfire, have few infructescences per plant and retain their seeds in the fruit until the shrub is burned. The single-stemmed form is found in areas such as the Lamington National Park where fire is rare, and these plants have many infructescences which release their seeds as the fruit matures.

== Conservation ==
This banksia is not considered at risk as it is widespread, locally common and protected in reserves in both New South Wales and Queensland.

== Use in horticulture ==
This banksia species is not often cultivated. Alex George suggests that it is probably similar to B. spinulosa var. spinulosa in cultivation, but should tolerate colder conditions.

== Gallery ==
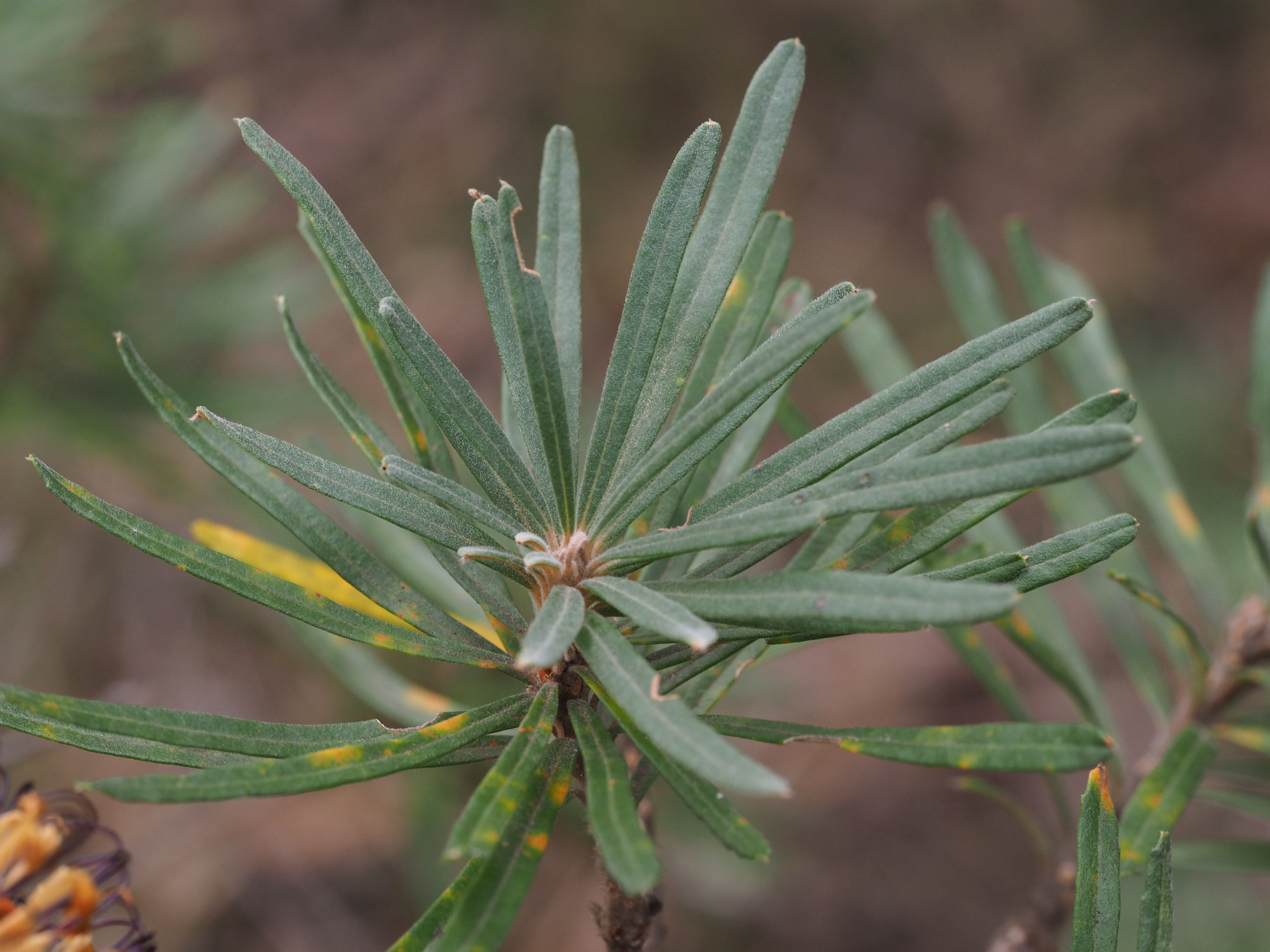
Banksia neoanglica leaves

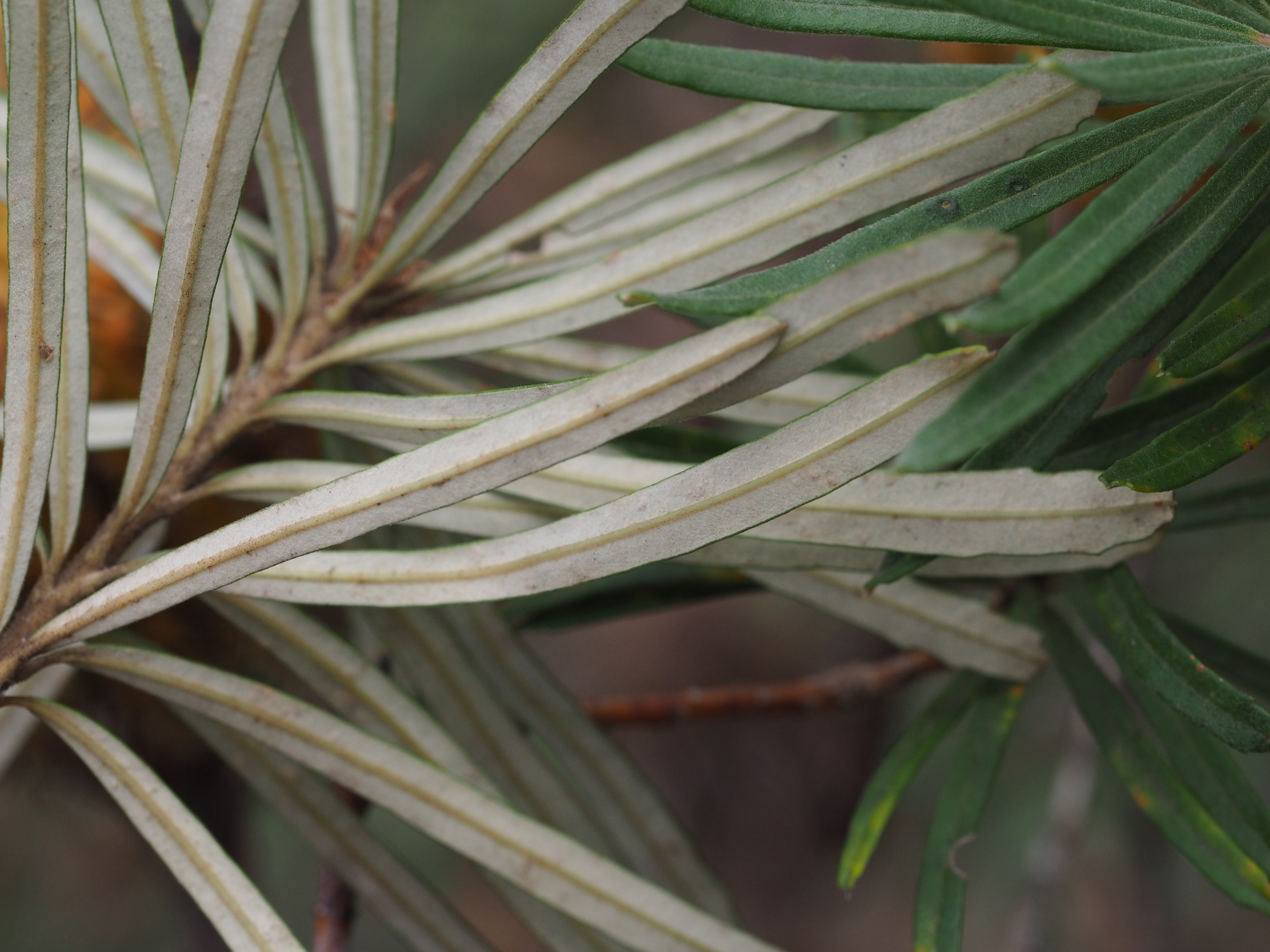
Lower surface of leaves

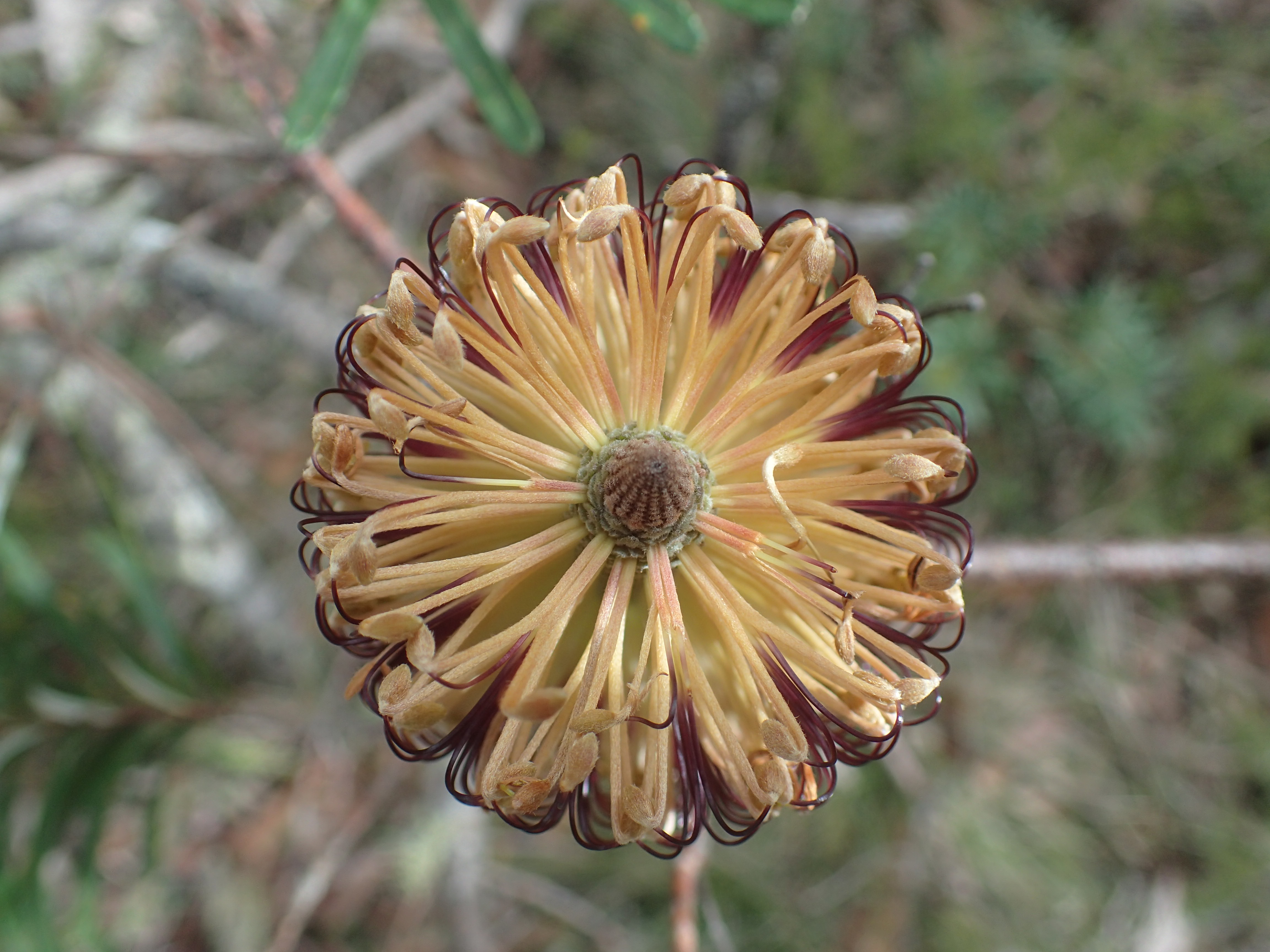
Top end of flower spike

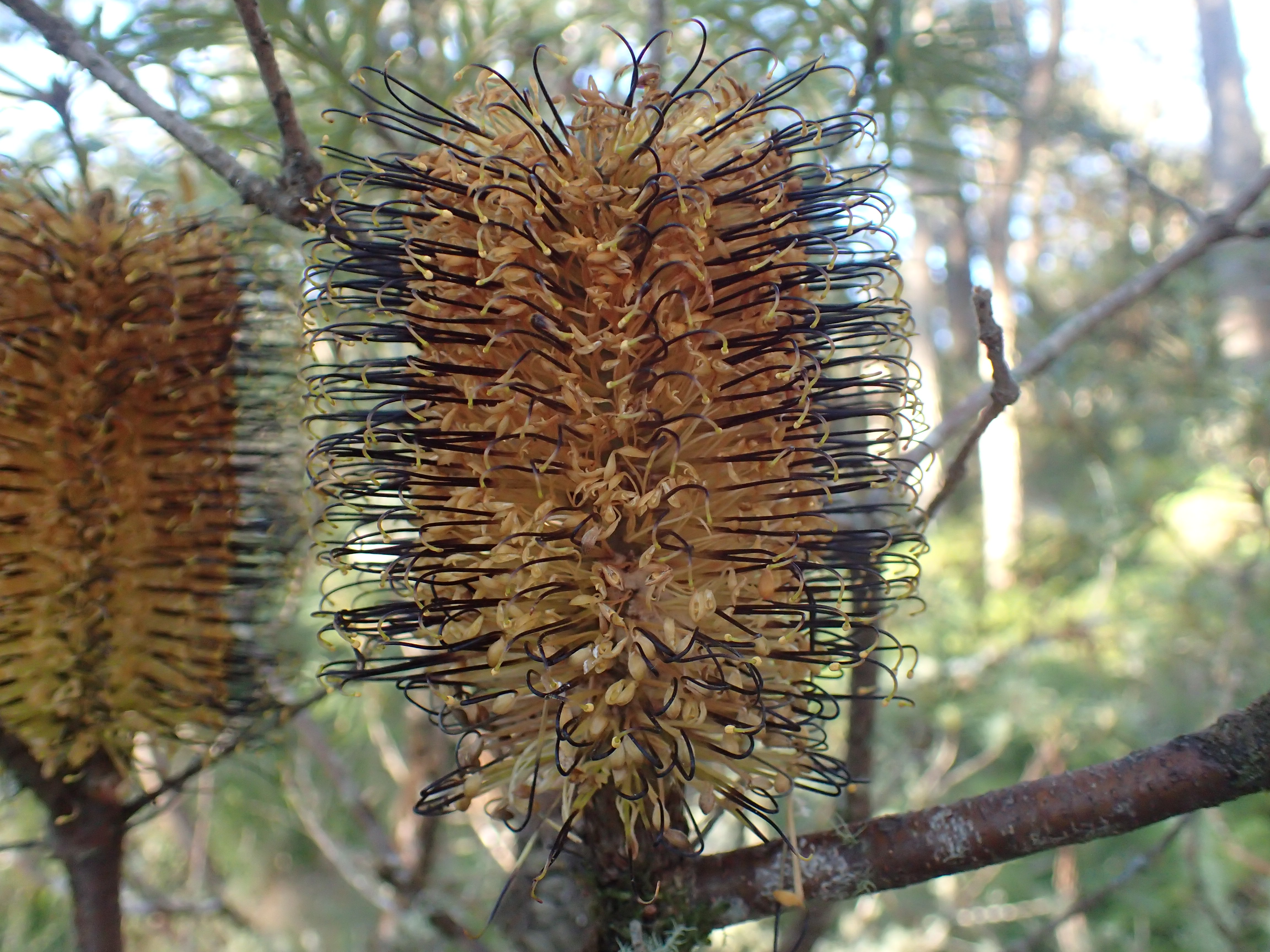
Open flowers

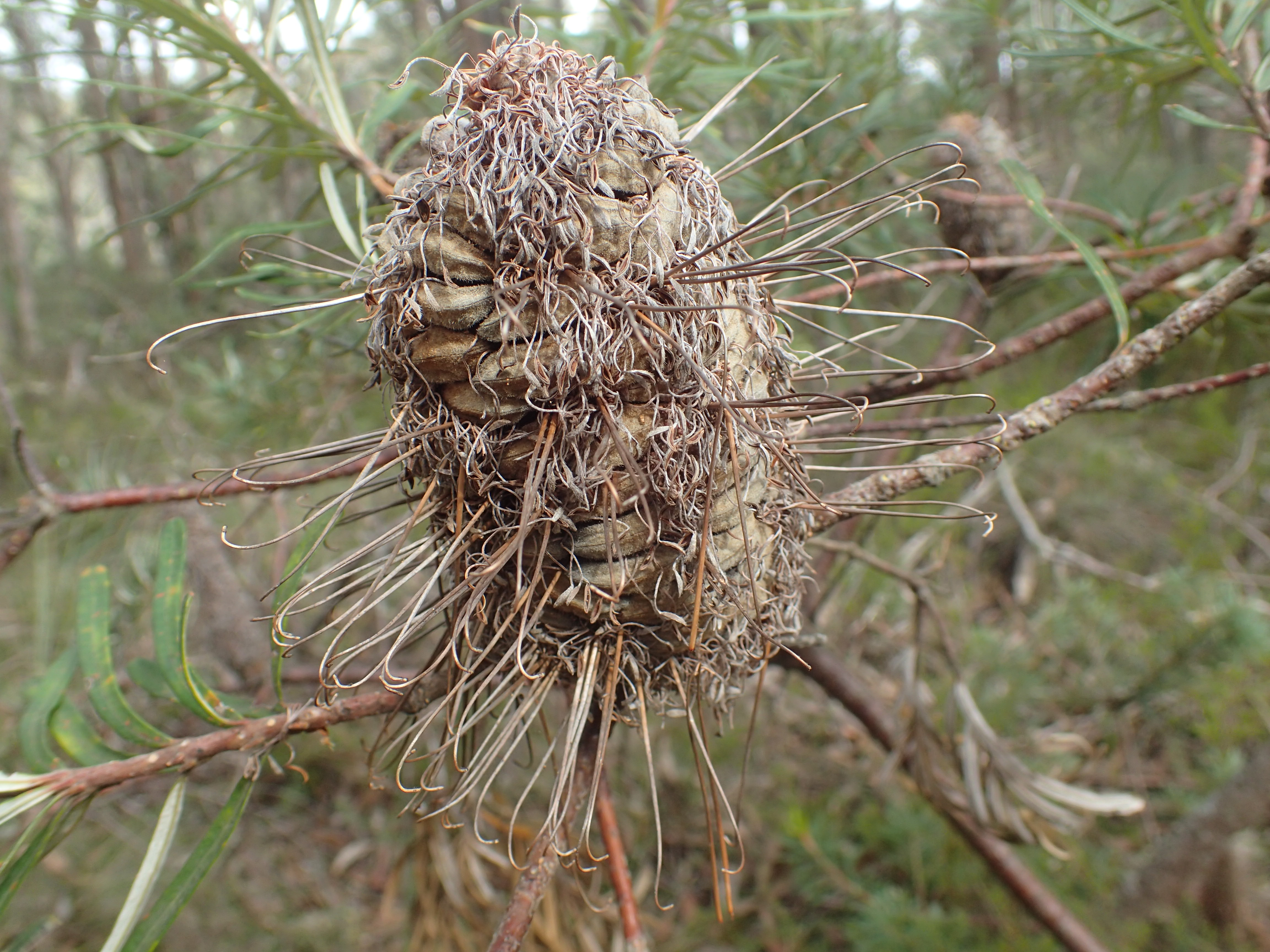
Mature infructescence
