= Grevillea rubiginosa =

Conservation status
- Least Concern (IUCN 3.1)

Scientific classification
- Kingdom: Plantae
- Clade: Tracheophytes
- Clade: Angiosperms
- Clade: Eudicots
- Order: Proteales
- Family: Proteaceae
- Genus: Grevillea
- Species: G. rubiginosa

Binomial name
- Grevillea rubiginosa Brongn. & Gris

Synonyms
- Grevillea exul subsp. rubiginosa (Brongn. & Gris) Virot; Hakea rubiginosa (Brongn. & Gris) Christenh. & Byng

Species of shrub endemic to New Caledonia

Grevillea rubiginosa is a species of flowering plant in the family Proteaceae and is endemic to south-eastern New Caledonia.

== Description ==
Grevillea rubiginosa is an open tree or shrub which can grow up to 10 metres (33 ft) tall in sheltered areas and 4 metres (13 ft) in open habitats. Its leaves are 4.5–13.5 centimetres (1.8–5.3 in) long and 0.5–5.7 centimetres (0.20–2.24 in) wide with a red indumentum on the underside. The conflorescence is much-branched and the floral rachis has distinctive reddish hairs. The perianth is oblong-ovoid in shape, 10–15 millimetres (0.39–0.59 in) long, 2–3 millimetres (0.079–0.118 in) wide and hairy on the external surface. The pistil is 26.5–42.5 millimetres (1.04–1.67 in) long and glabrous. Both the perianth and style are creamy-white. The fruit is a follicle 15–20 millimetres (0.59–0.79 in) long and 12–15 millimetres (0.47–0.59 in) wide that is smooth and in an oblique position on the pedicel. Flowering occurs between May and January, usually flowering later in higher altitudes.

== Taxonomy ==
This species was formerly regarded as a subspecies of Grevillea exul. The specific epithet is derived from the Latin rubiginosis, meaning "rusty red" in reference to the red or brown hairs on the floral rachis.

== Distribution and habitat ==
Grevillea rubiginosa is endemic to the southern half of the island of New Caledonia, where it receives 900–3,000 mm (35–118 in) of annual rainfall. It grows from 0 to 1,000 metres (3,300 ft) above sea level in a variety of soil types and habitats including gravelly loam in scrub or open forest, schist and skeletal soil on rocky ridges and slopes and alluvial sand along watercourses such as streams.

== Conservation status ==
Grevillea rubiginosa is listed as least concern on the IUCN Red List of Threatened Species. Despite its limited distribution and impacts on some subpopulations from habitat clearance from mining activities and bushfires, it is a very common species and its threats do not impact it significantly enough to warrant it as a threatened or near threatened species. It may be regarded as a pioneer species as it is resilient to natural disturbance.
