= Banksia 'Lemon Glow' =

Cultivar of Banksia spinulosa

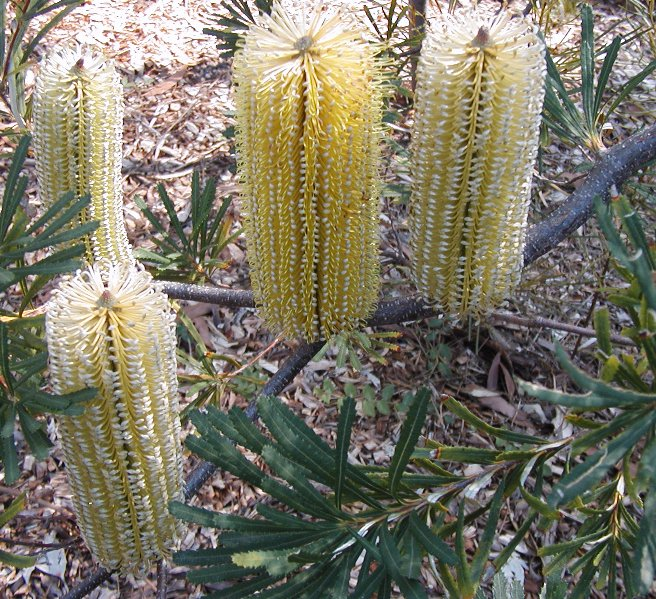
- In Illawarra Grevillea Park
- Species: Banksia spinulosa var. cunninghamii
- Cultivar: 'Lemon Glow'
- Origin: French Island, Victoria, Australia

Banksia 'Lemon Glow', also known by its extended cultivar name Banksia spinulosa var. cunninghamii 'Lemon Glow', is a form of Banksia spinulosa var. cunninghamii with lemon-yellow flowers. It was selected by Alf Salkin from a wild population on French Island, Victoria, and registered as a cultivar on 5 October 1982. It typically grows 2–3 m (7–10 feet) tall by 2 m (7 feet) wide. It flowers from April to May.

Unlike its parent species, its flower styles are yellow rather than black. In all other respects it is typical of B. spinulosa var. cunninghamii.
