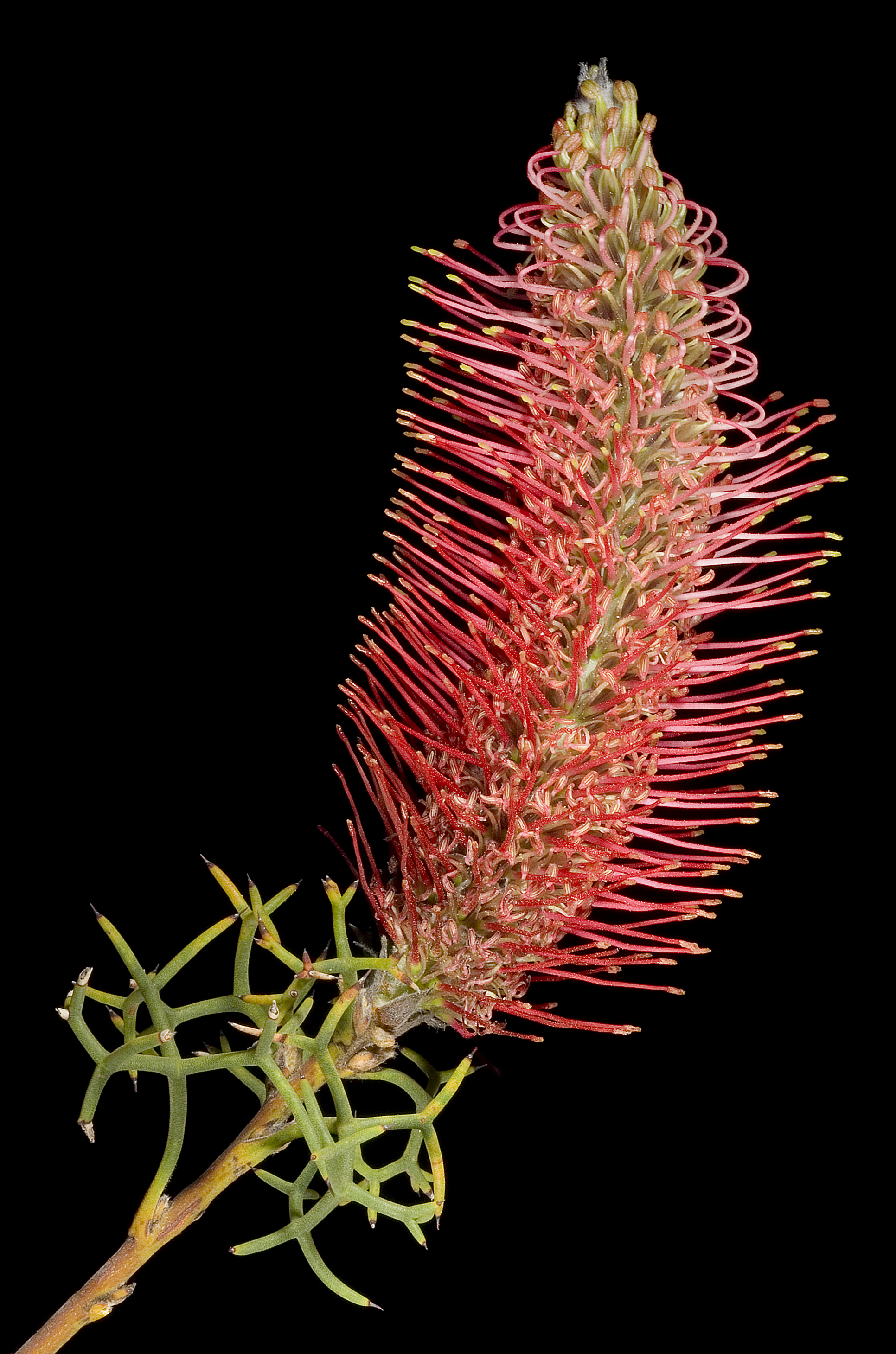

Scientific classification
- Kingdom: Plantae
- Clade: Tracheophytes
- Clade: Angiosperms
- Clade: Eudicots
- Order: Proteales
- Family: Proteaceae
- Genus: Grevillea
- Species: G. paradoxa

Binomial name
- Grevillea paradoxa F.Muell.

= Grevillea paradoxa =

Species of shrub endemic to Western Australia

Grevillea paradoxa, commonly known as the bottlebrush grevillea, is a species of flowering plant in the family Proteaceae and is endemic to the south-west of Western Australia. It is an erect to spreading, prickly shrub with pinnatipartite leaves, the lobes linear, widely spreading and sharply pointed, and with cylindrical clusters of pale to dark pink or cream-coloured flowers with a pinkish-red style.

== Description ==
Grevillea paradoxa is an erect to open, spreading shrub that typically grows to a height of 0.5–2 m (1 ft 8 in – 6 ft 7 in) and has prickly foliage. Its leaves are 15–55 mm (0.59–2.17 in) long and pinnatipartite, with 3 to 9 widely spreading, sharply pointed, linear lobes, each usually dividing at least once, the end lobes 5–20 mm (0.20–0.79 in) long and 0.5–1.5 mm (0.020–0.059 in) wide. The flowers are arranged in erect, cylindrical clusters on a rachis 40–80 mm (1.6–3.1 in) long, and are pale to dark pink or cream-coloured, the pistil 15–18 mm (0.59–0.71 in) long and the style pinkish-red or pale pink to cream. Flowering mainly occurs from June to October, and the fruit is an oval follicle 8–13 mm (0.31–0.51 in) long and hairy.

== Taxonomy ==
Grevillea paradoxa was first formally described in 1868 by Ferdinand von Mueller in Fragmenta Phytographiae Australiae from specimens collected by James Drummond. The specific epithet (paradoxa) means "unexpected, strange or marvellous", because von Mueller thought the plant looked Hakea-like.

== Distribution and habitat ==
Bottlebrush grevillea grows in mallee scrub and shrubland and is widespread between Mullewa, Wubin, Kondinin Kalgoorlie and the Die Hardy Range in the Avon Wheatbelt, Coolgardie, Geraldton Sandplains, Mallee, Murchison and Yalgoo bioregions of south-western Western Australia.

== Conservation status ==
This grevillea is listed as "not threatened", by the Western Australian Government Department of Biodiversity, Conservation and Attractions.

== Use in horticulture ==
The popular garden plant, Grevillea 'Dorothy Gordon', is a hybrid between G. sessilis and G. paradoxa.

== See also ==
- List of Grevillea species
