= Illawarra Grevillea Park =

Botanical garden in New South Wales, Australia

- Illawarra Grevillea Park Botanic Garden
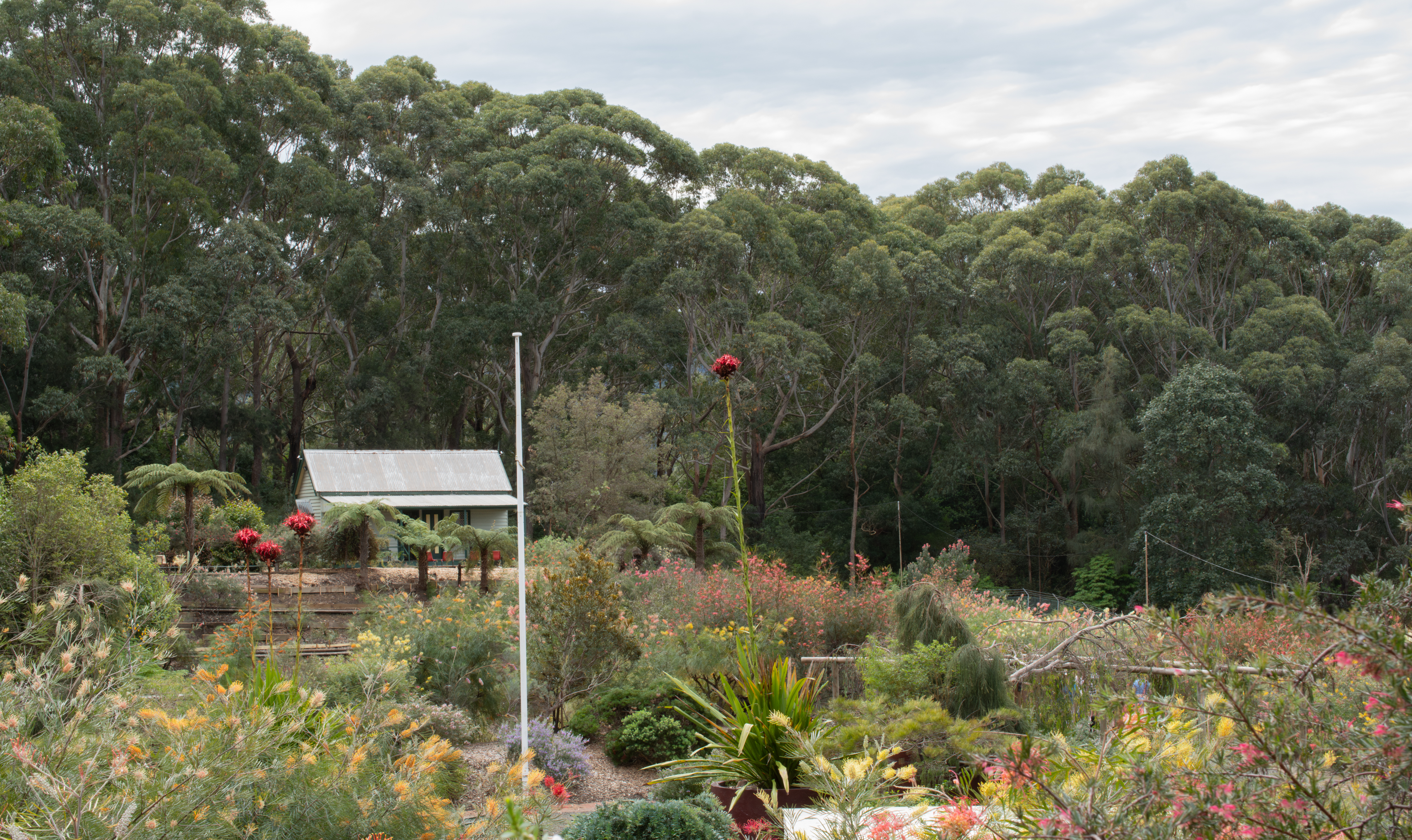
- Interactive map of Illawarra Grevillea Park
- Type: Botanical Garden
- Location: Bulli, New South Wales, Australia
- Coordinates: 34°19′48″S 150°54′27″E
- Area: 2.4 ha (0.024 km^{2})
- Opened: September 25, 1993
- Founder: Ray Brown
- Species: Grevillea, Banksia, Eremophila and miscellaneous other Australian native plants.
- Facilities: Picnic areas; Chapel; Car park; Public toilets
- Website: illawarragrevilleapark.com.au

The Illawarra Grevillea Park is a botanical garden located in Bulli on the south coast of New South Wales, Australia.

Opened in 1993 by professional gardener Ray Brown, it is notable for its extensive collection of grevilleas, both cultivars and naturally occurring species. It also features many other plants from all over Australia as well as a naturally occurring rainforest, a small chapel, public toilets, parking and picnic facilities.

== History ==
During the mid-1980s, a permanent location for Australian Plant Society Grevillea Study Group's collection of grevilleas and other native plants was needed, which at the time were being kept in pots by founder and professional gardener, Ray Brown. Many of these plants were sourced from the wild all over Australia, and included species that were either threatened or were extremely rare in horticulture in New South Wales. Ray had designed the layout of the park five years prior to its creation, but did not have the land available to begin construction.

Ray made an approach to Wollongong City Council for a lease of council owned land behind the Bulli Showground, and in 1987, the Illawarra Grevillea Park began being established. The garden beds, fencing, roads and paths were all constructed under Ray's guidance, with much of the work being done by volunteers.

The park was officially opened to the public on September 25, 1993.

To honour Ray's work and long contribution to the collection, horticulture and growing of grevilleas and the creation of the park, a newly described species of grevillea, Grevillea raybrownii was named after him by Peter Olde and Neil Marriott in 1994.

On August 12, 2022, the park gained official status as a botanical garden, with an opening being conducted by NSW governor Margaret Joan Beazley.

== Description ==
Set on 2.4 hectares of land on the outskirts of Wollongong, the Illawarra Grevillea Park is a not-for-profit botanical garden featuring multiple display gardens primarily consisting of grevillea species, cultivars and hybrids, as well as a variety of other Australian native plants and a native rainforest.

The park was created with the aim of showcasing and encouraging the appreciation of Australia's plant biodiversity, providing information on native plant gardening and contributing to the study and conservation of rare and endangered plants. The park is continually maintained by volunteers throughout the year, but is only open to the public on open days on the first two Saturdays and Sundays of Autumn, Winter and Spring each year.

=== Grevilleas ===
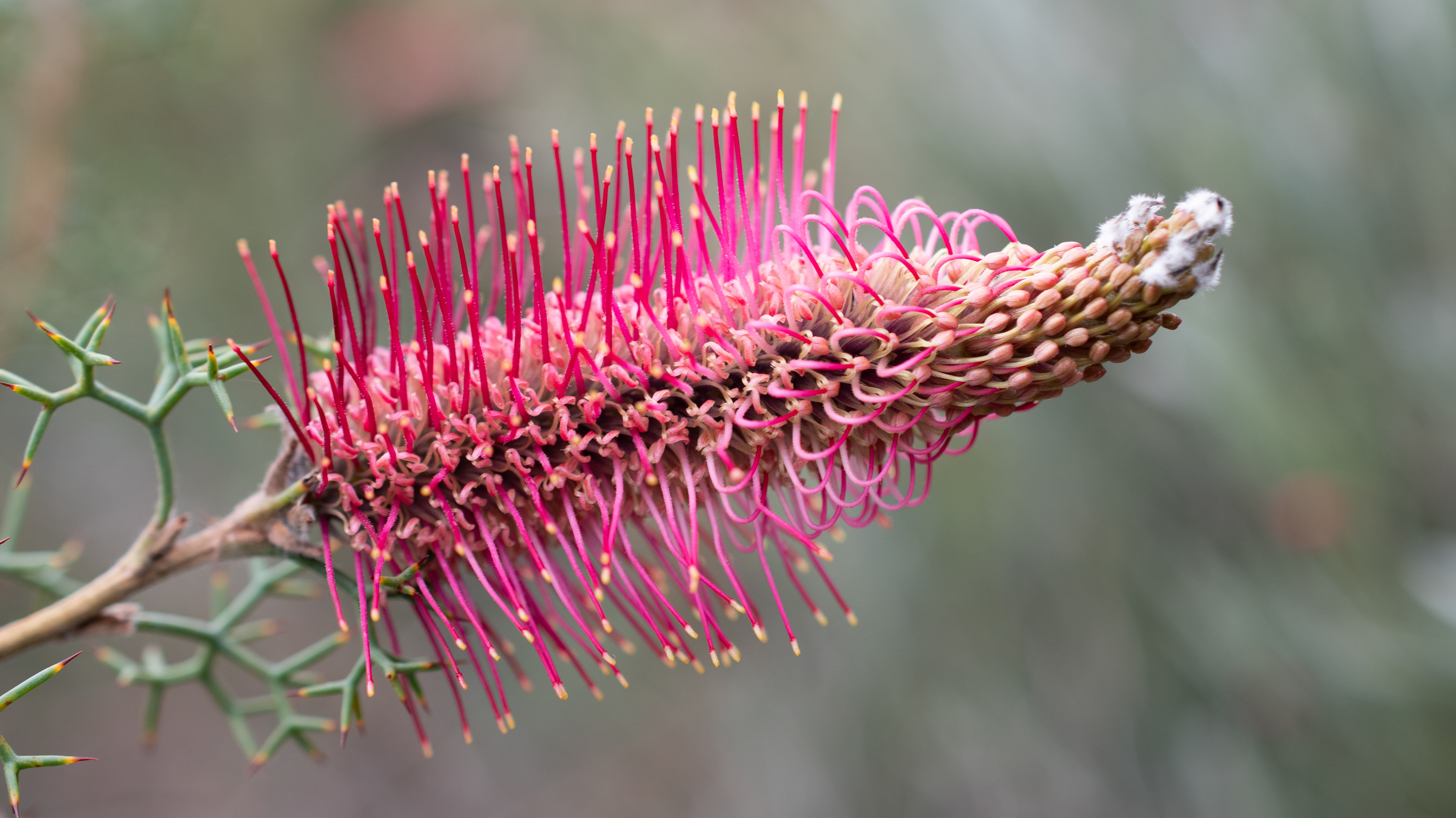
Grevillea paradoxa inflorescence

The park contains an extensive collection of up to 300-400 grevillea species, cultivars and hybrids. Many of the grevillea species were collected from the wild by Ray Brown and botanist, Peter Olde. Some of the grevilleas are grafted, which allows a variety of new forms to be created, such as ground cover grevilleas being grafted onto Grevillea robusta to create a tall "weeping" form. Grafting also allows species from all across Australia, particularly those from Western Australia and the Northern Territory to grow within the park, as their roots would not survive otherwise.

Grevillea cultivars "Bulli Beauty" "Bulli Envy" and "Bulli Princess" originated in the Illawarra Grevillea Park, all emerging as chance seedlings.

=== Banksias ===
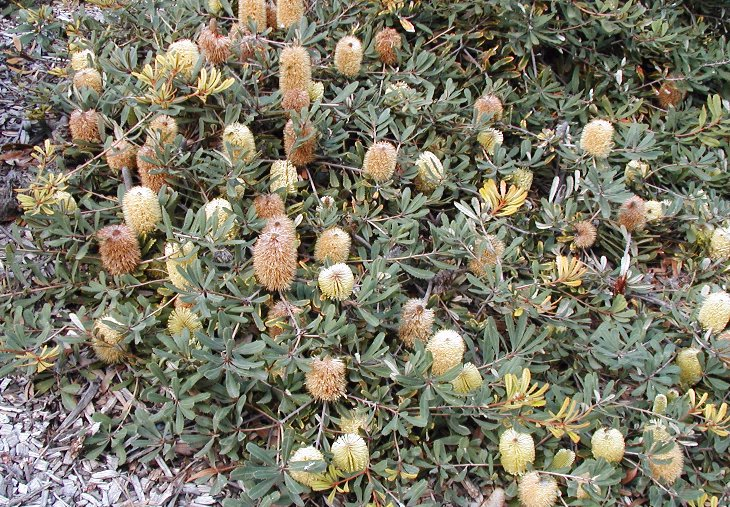
Banksia oblongifolia prostrate form

The park also has a variety of Banksia species and cultivars, including a number of forms of the regionally native B. serrata, B. integrifolia and B. spinulosa. A mass planting of the dwarf B. spinulosa cultivar, "Bush Candles" becomes a main attraction of the park when it is in full bloom during the months of autumn.

=== Chapel ===
The park has a small chapel. It was built in the late 1800s as an interdenominational church in a long-gone village named Sherbrooke, where it was known as the Union Church. In 1902, Sherbrooke was resumed by the NSW Government and flooded for the Cataract Dam Project. Before the village was flooded, the church was relocated in parts by bullock train to Woonona near Wollongong to be used as a private residence. In 1992, the chapel was under threat of being bulldozed for new home units. It was saved by local historians and was relocated to the Illawarra Grevillea Park, where it was restored to its original state. Today, the chapel serves as a wedding venue, administration venue and bookstore during the park's open days.
