= Banksia 'Birthday Candles' =

Dwarf cultivae of Banksia spinulosa

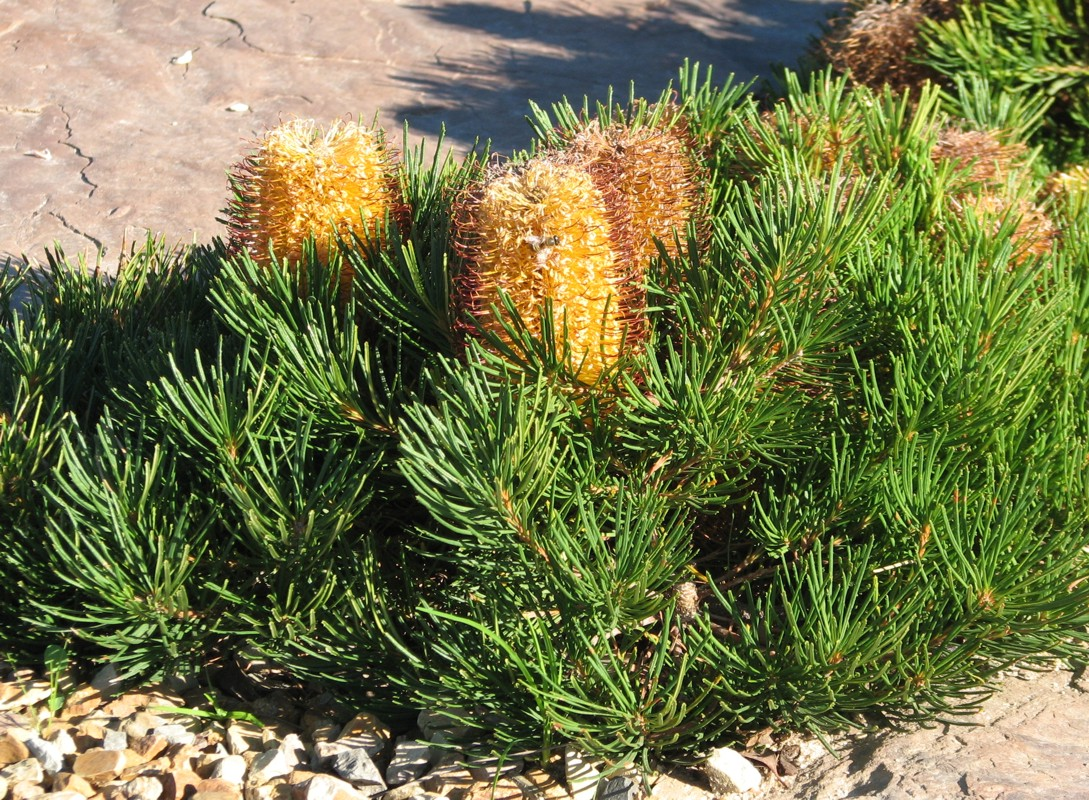
- Genus: Banksia
- Species: B. spinulosa var. spinulosa
- Cultivar: 'Birthday Candles'
- Origin: Austraflora Nurseries, Montrose, Victoria, Australia

Banksia 'Birthday Candles' is a dwarf cultivar of Banksia spinulosa var. spinulosa developed by Bill Molyneux of Austraflora Nurseries in Montrose, Victoria. It has since become the highest-selling native plant in Australia.

== Description ==
Its height averages 18 cm, and its width 44 cm. The inflorescences are short and upright and appear on branch ends from early autumn to early spring (March to September in Australia). They are yellow, with contrasting red styles.

== Origin ==
It was selected in 1985 from a number of seedlings which were raised at Austraflora Nurseries in Australia, the original material hailing from Schnapper Point near Ulladulla on the New South Wales South Coast.

== Cultivation ==
The cultivar is said to be adaptable to a wide range of climatic conditions including a moderate tolerance of frost. It has a high tolerance to salt-laden coastal winds.
