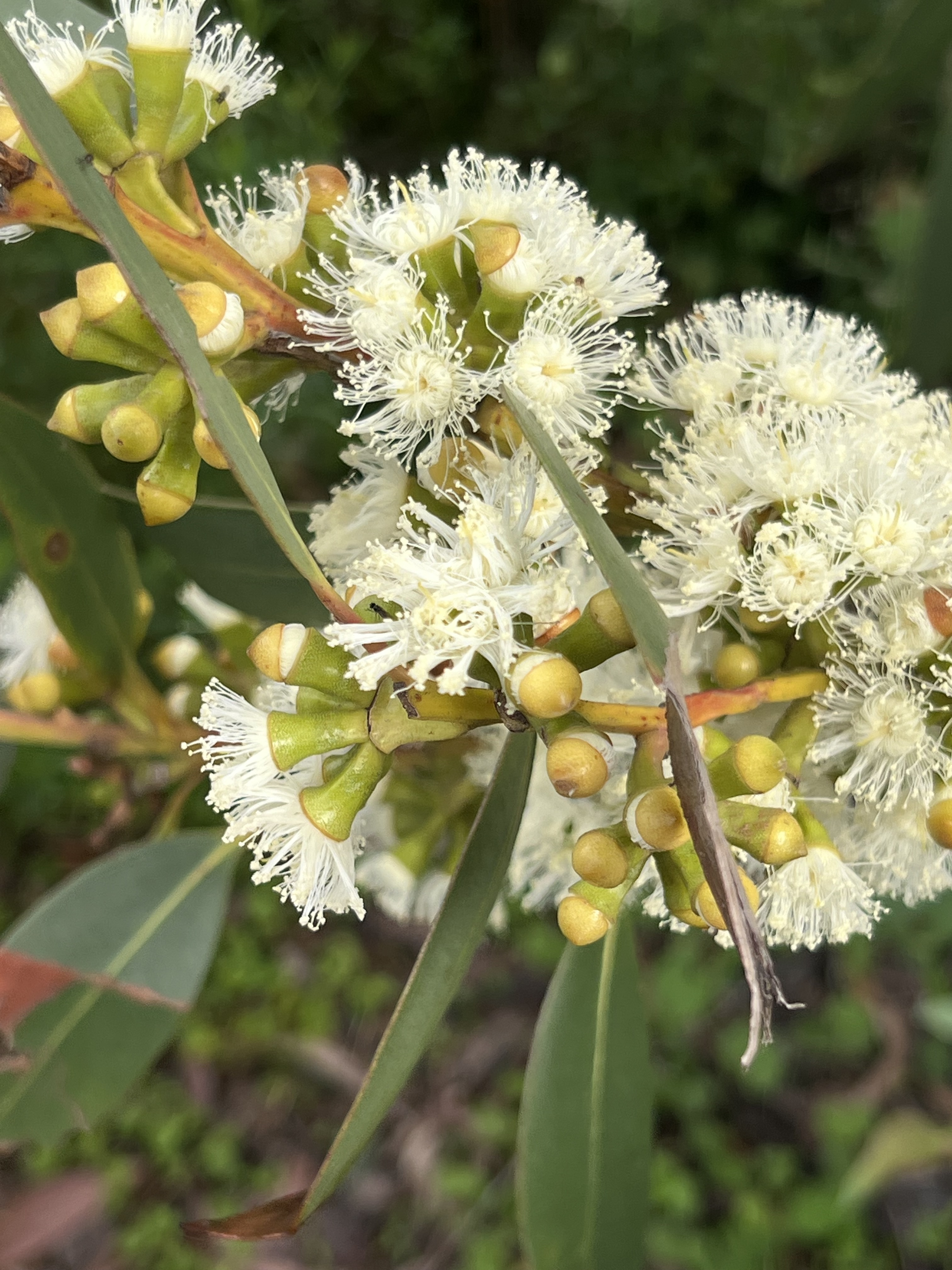

Conservation status
- Vulnerable (EPBC Act)

Scientific classification
- Kingdom: Plantae
- Clade: Embryophytes
- Clade: Tracheophytes
- Clade: Spermatophytes
- Clade: Angiosperms
- Clade: Eudicots
- Clade: Rosids
- Order: Myrtales
- Family: Myrtaceae
- Genus: Eucalyptus
- Species: E. langleyi

Binomial name
- Eucalyptus langleyi L.A.S.Johnson & Blaxell

= Eucalyptus langleyi =

Green mallee ash

Species of eucalyptus

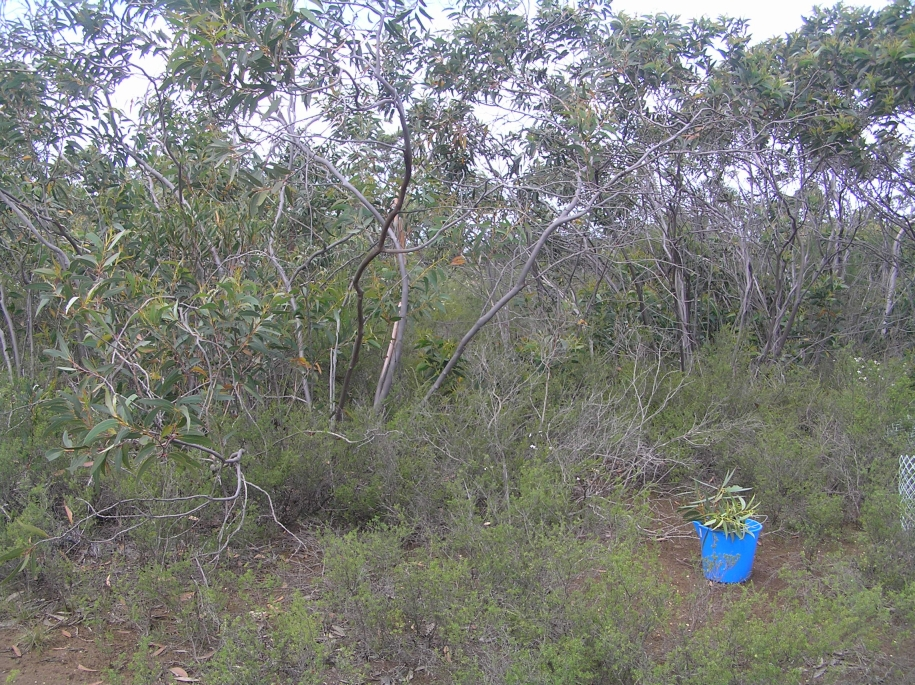
E langleyi trees 050127 01

Eucalyptus langleyi, commonly known as the green mallee ash or albatross mallee, is a species of mallee that is endemic to a small area of New South Wales. It has mostly smooth grey to yellowish bark, lance-shaped to curved adult leaves, flower buds in groups of seven, white flowers and cup-shaped to barrel-shaped fruit.

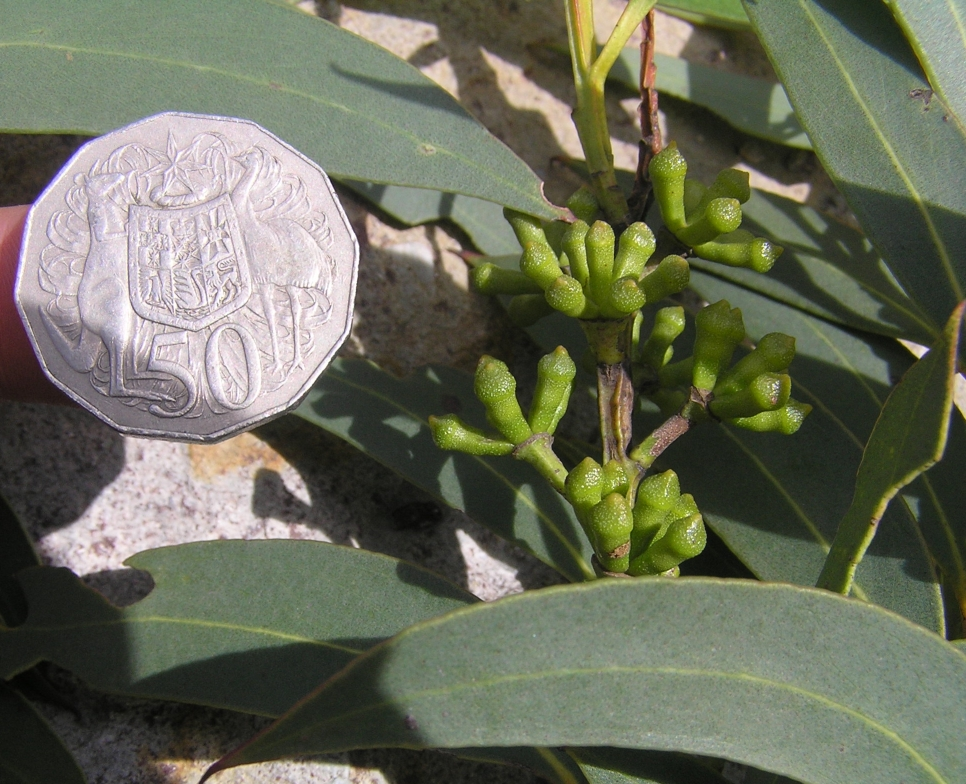
Leaves and flower buds with a 50 cent coin for reference

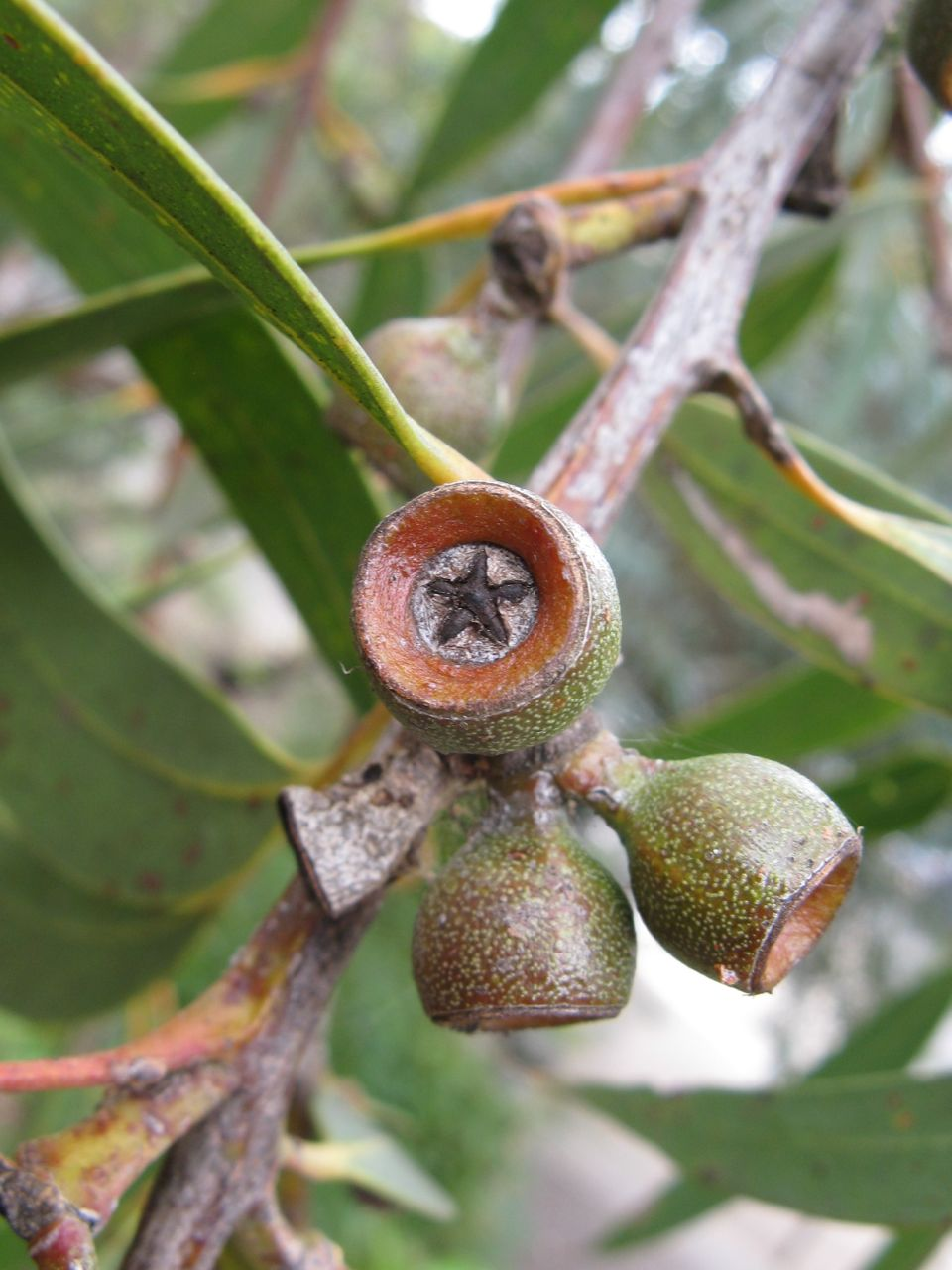
Fruit

== Description ==
Eucalyptus langleyi is a mallee that typically grows to a height of 5–6 m (16–20 ft) and forms a lignotuber. It has smooth, grey, green or pink bark that is shed in ribbons. Young plants and coppice regrowth have stems that are more or less square in cross-section, often with a wing at each corner, and lance-shaped to curved leaves that are 90–140 mm (3.5–5.5 in) long, 20–55 mm (0.79–2.17 in) wide and arranged in opposite pairs. Adult leaves are arranged alternately, the same glossy green on both sides, broadly lance-shaped to curved, 80–165 mm (3.1–6.5 in) long and 18–50 mm (0.71–1.97 in) wide on a petiole 10–23 mm (0.39–0.91 in) long. The flower buds are arranged in leaf axils in groups of seven on an unbranched, broadly winged peduncle 6–12 mm (0.24–0.47 in) long, the individual buds on pedicels 1–4 mm (0.039–0.157 in) long. Mature buds are oval to oblong or pear-shaped with a pimply surface, 7–9 mm (0.28–0.35 in) long and 4–5 mm (0.16–0.20 in) wide with a conical to rounded or beaked operculum that is much shorter than the floral cup. Flowering has been recorded in May, September and November and the flowers are white. The fruit is a woody cup-shaped or barrel-shaped capsule 7–10 mm (0.28–0.39 in) long and 8–12 mm (0.31–0.47 in) wide with the valves near rim level or enclosed below it.

== Taxonomy and naming ==
Eucalyptus langleyi was first formally described in 1991 by Lawrie Johnson and Donald Blaxell from a specimen collected by Blaxell and Douglas Howard Benson near Yalwal Road, Nowra in 1974, and the description was published in the journal Telopea. The specific epithet (langleyi) honours "Lawrence Langley of Robertson" who drew the authors' attention to the species.

== Distribution and habitat ==
The green mallee ash grows in mallee shrubland in shallow, sandy soil over sandstone. It is only known from two stands south-west of Nowra.

== Conservation status ==
This mallee is listed as "vulnerable" under the Australian Government Environment Protection and Biodiversity Conservation Act 1999 and the New South Wales Government Biodiversity Conservation Act 2016. The population occurring north of the Shoalhaven River contained 32 plants in 1998, but a survey ten years later found only 20 of them still alive. This population is listed as "critically endangered" under the New South Wales Act. The main threats to the species are residential and recreational development and by road, trail and pipeline maintenance. In 2000, three clumps of trees were destroyed during gas pipe line constructions and others were covered in debris.
