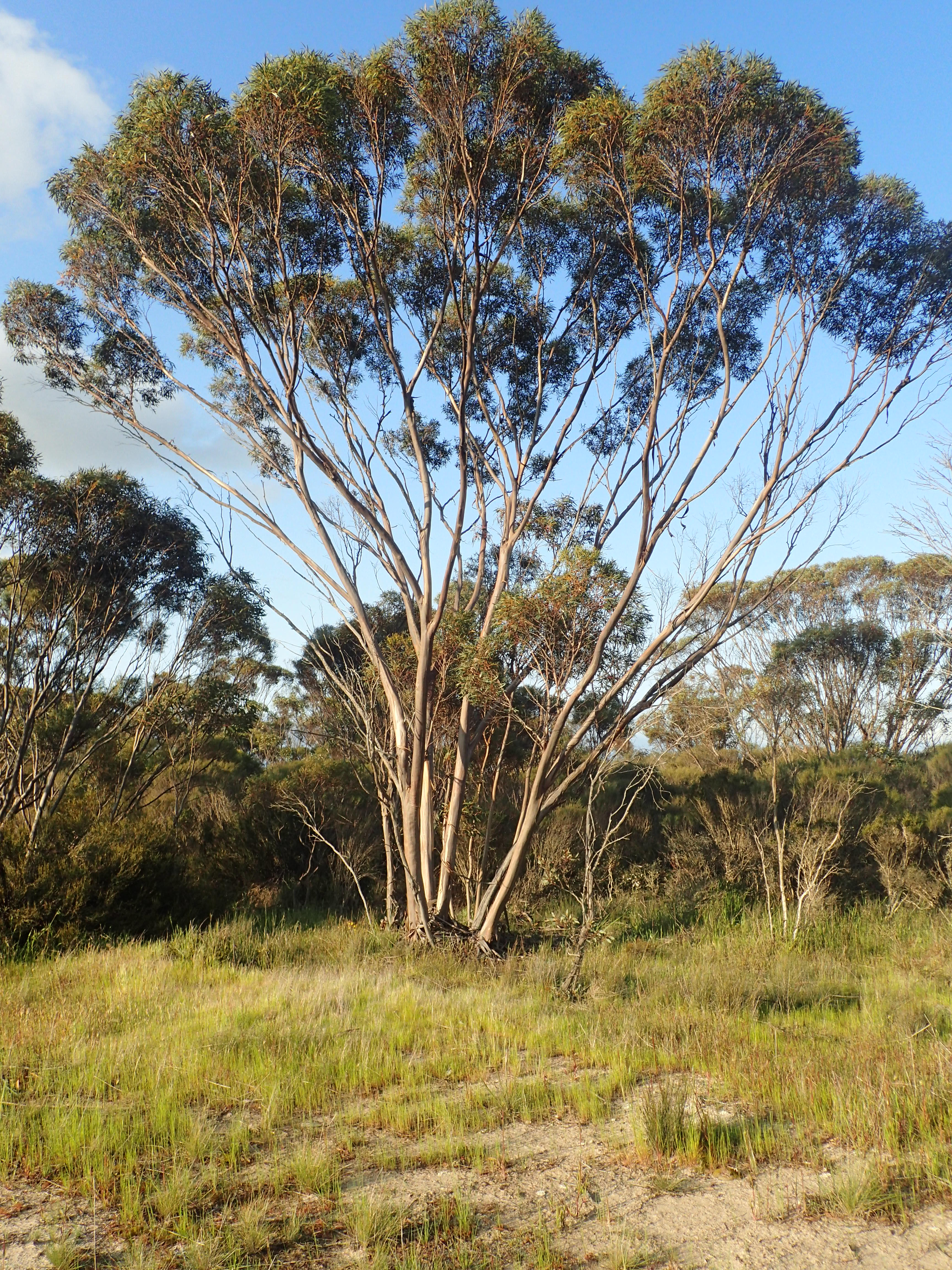
- Habit of Eucalyptus scyphocalyx north of Ongerup

Conservation status
- Least Concern (IUCN 3.1)

Scientific classification
- Kingdom: Plantae
- Clade: Embryophytes
- Clade: Tracheophytes
- Clade: Spermatophytes
- Clade: Angiosperms
- Clade: Eudicots
- Clade: Rosids
- Order: Myrtales
- Family: Myrtaceae
- Genus: Eucalyptus
- Species: E. scyphocalyx

Binomial name
- Eucalyptus scyphocalyx (F.Muell. ex Benth.) Maiden & Blakley

= Eucalyptus scyphocalyx =

Goblet mallee

Species of eucalyptus

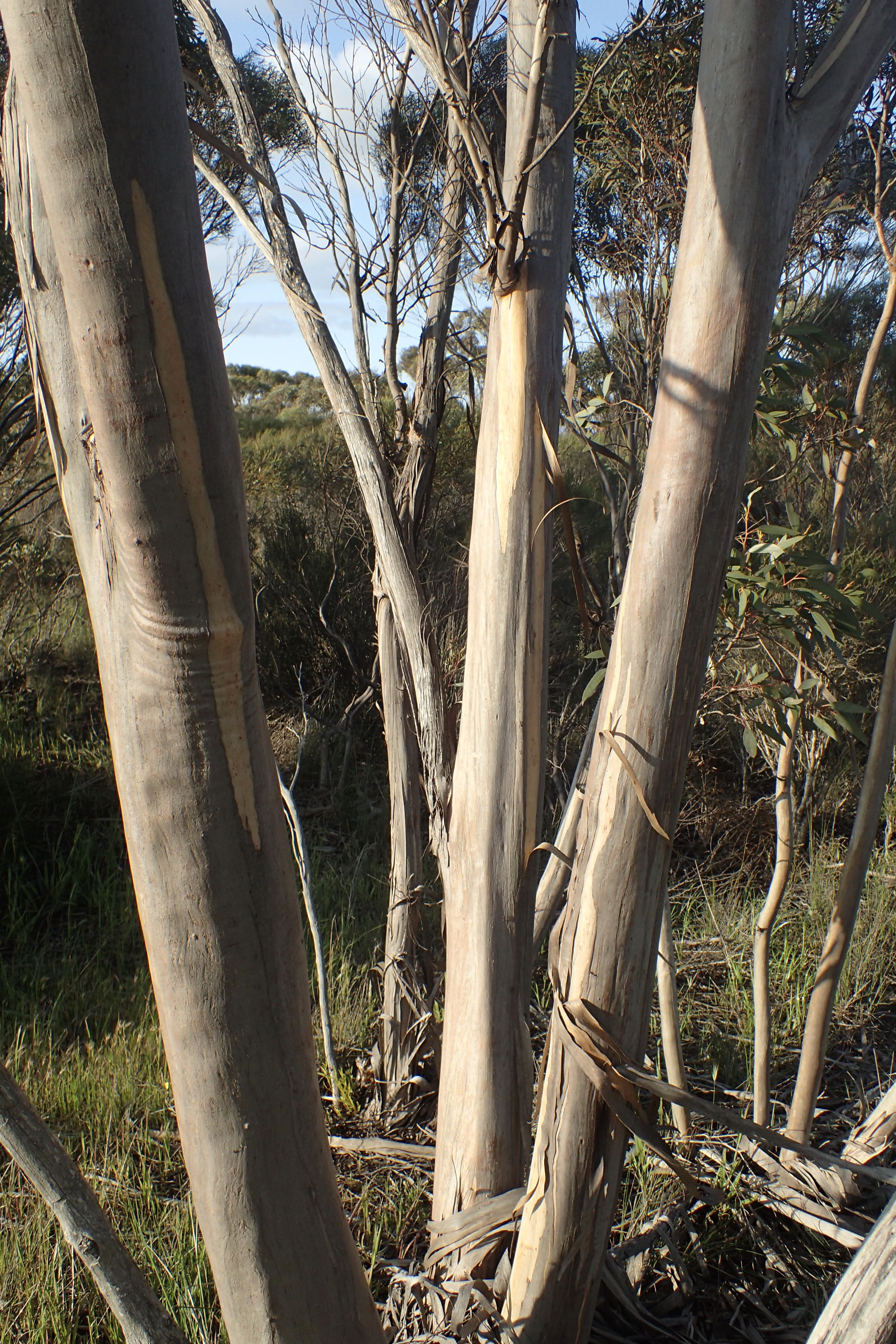
Bark

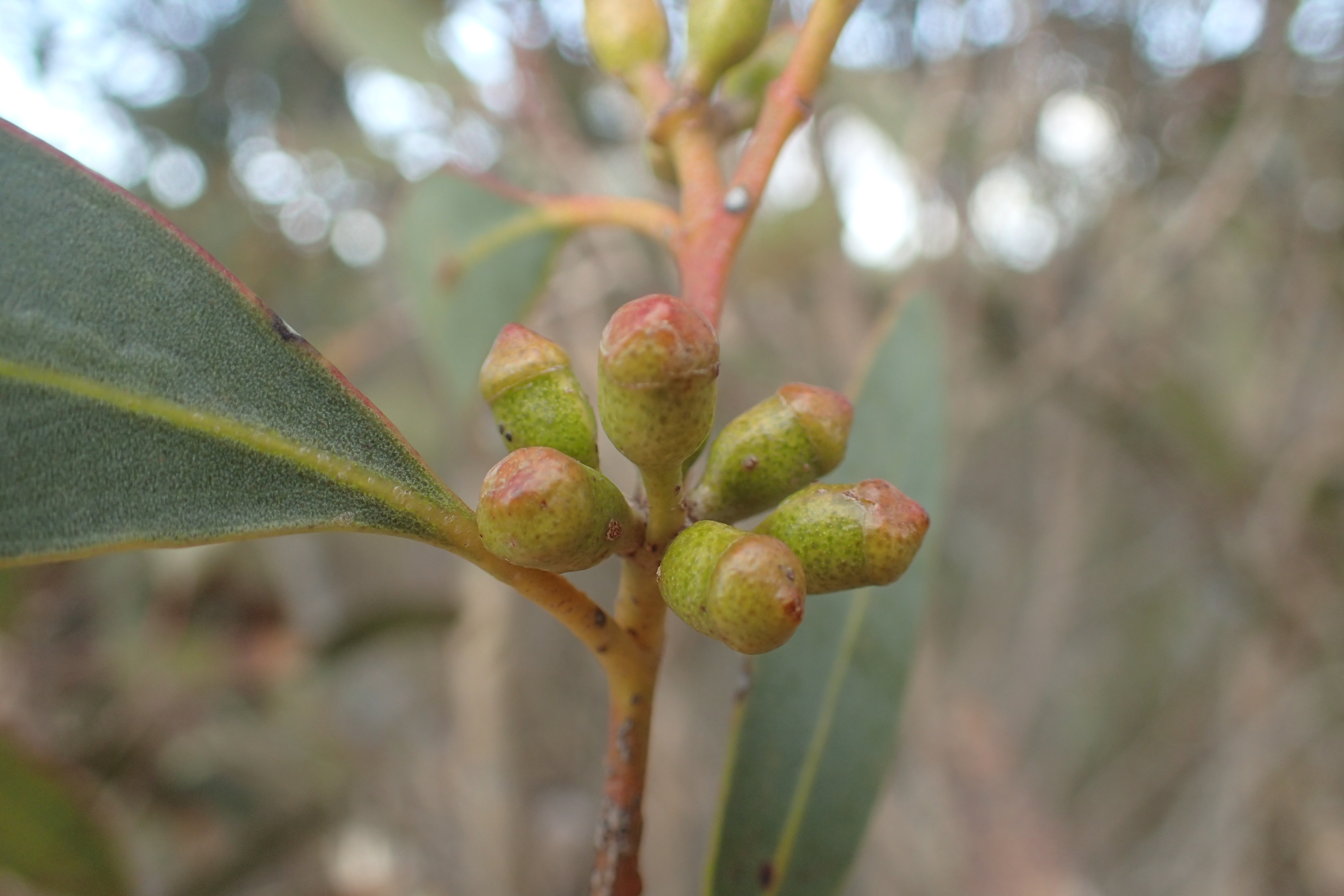
Flower buds

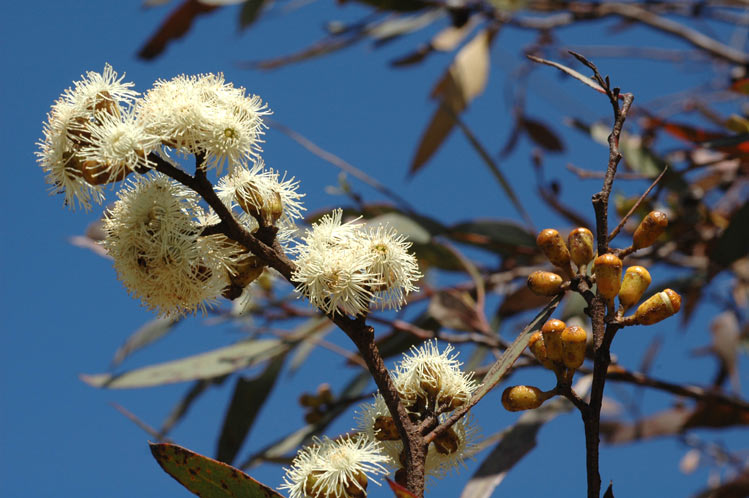
Flowers

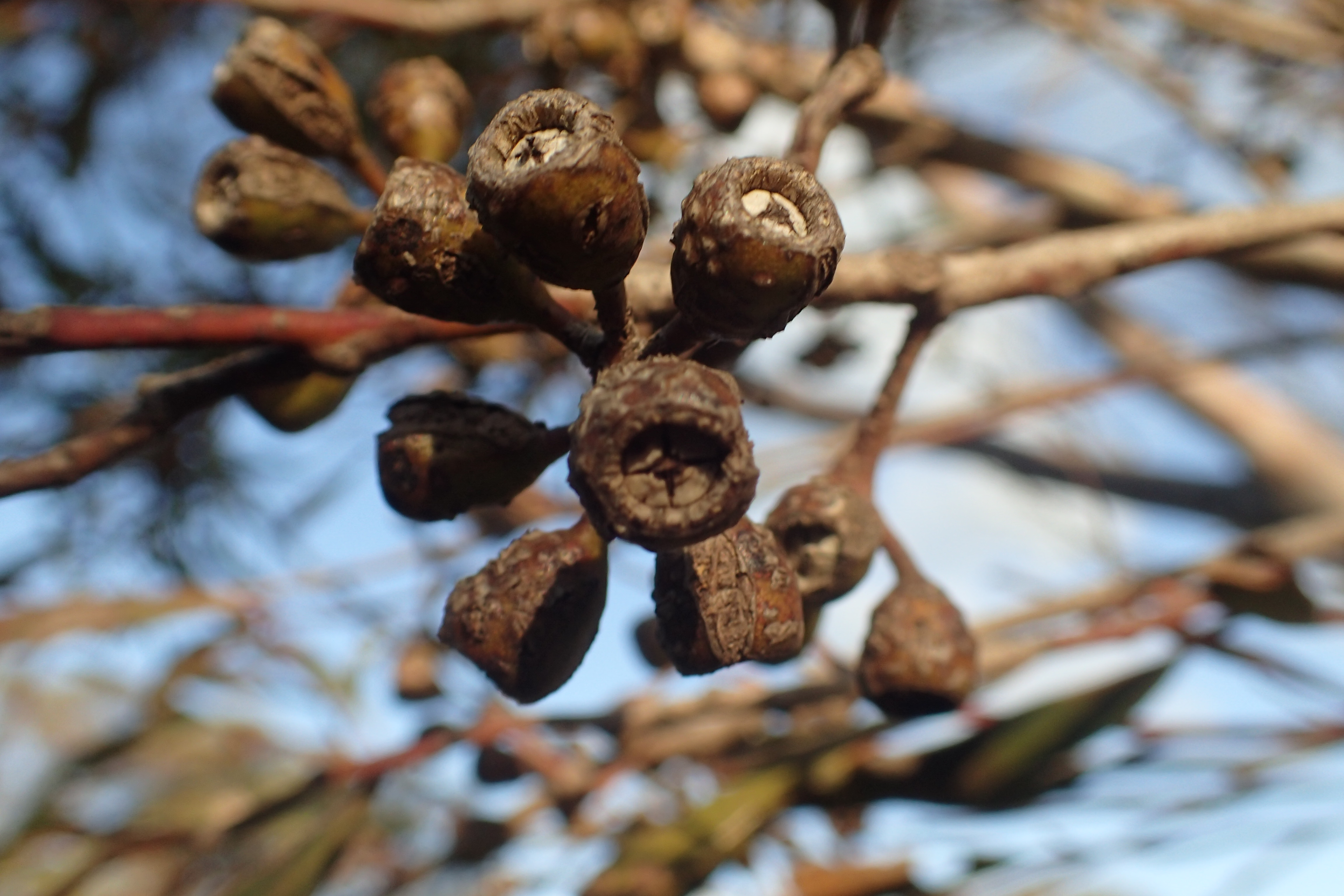
Fruit

Eucalyptus scyphocalyx, commonly known as goblet mallee, is a species of mallee that is endemic to southern areas of Western Australia. It has smooth bark, lance-shaped adult leaves, flower buds in groups of three or seven, creamy white flowers and cup-shaped to cylindrical fruit.

== Description ==
Eucalyptus scyphocalyx is a mallee that typically grows to a height of 2–6 m (6 ft 7 in – 19 ft 8 in) and forms a lignotuber. It has smooth pale brown and grey bark, although larger specimens often have a stocking of rough, ribbony bark near the base. Young plants and coppice regrowth have dull green, lance-shaped leaves that are 50–85 mm (2.0–3.3 in) long and 10–20 mm (0.39–0.79 in) wide. Adult leaves are the same shade of green on both sides, lance-shaped, 60–105 mm (2.4–4.1 in) long and 10–20 mm (0.39–0.79 in) wide, the base tapering to a petiole 8–23 mm (0.31–0.91 in) long. The flower buds are arranged in leaf axils in groups of three or seven on an unbranched peduncle 3–16 mm (0.12–0.63 in) long, the individual buds on pedicels 2–5 mm (0.079–0.197 in) long. Mature buds are cylindrical to spindle-shaped, 7–13 mm (0.28–0.51 in) long and 4–7 mm (0.16–0.28 in) wide with a hemispherical to conical operculum. Flowering mainly occurs from July or September to December and the flowers are creamy white. The fruit is a woody cup-shaped to cylindrical capsule 6–11 mm (0.24–0.43 in) long and 7–9 mm (0.28–0.35 in) wide with the valves below rim level.

== Taxonomy and naming ==
The goblet mallet was first formally described in 1867 by George Bentham from an unpublished description by Ferdinand von Mueller. Bentham published the description in Flora Australiensis and the plant was given the name Eucalyptus dumosa var. scyphocalyx. In 1929, Joseph Maiden and William Blakely raised the variety to species status as E. scyphocalyx, publishing the change in Maiden's book A Critical Revision of the Genus Eucalyptus. The specific epithet (scyphocalyx) is from the ancient Greek word scyphos, referring to the cup-like calyx.

In 2001, Lawrie Johnson and Donald Blaxell described two subspecies of E. scyphocalyx in the journal Telopea and the names have been accepted by the Australian Plant Census:

- Eucalyptus scyphocalyx (F.Muell. ex Benth.) Maiden & Blakely subsp. scyphocalyx has flower buds in groups of seven;
- Eucalyptus scyphocalyx subsp. triadica L.A.S.Johnson & K.D.Hill has flower buds in groups of three.

== Distribution and habitat ==
Eucalyptus scyphocalyx is found on sand plains between Jerramungup, Ravensthorpe and Salmon Gums in the Great Southern and Goldfields-Esperance regions. Subspecies triadica has a more restricted distribution in an area northeast of Esperance.

== Conservation status ==
This eucalypt is classified as "not threatened" by the Western Australian Government Department of Parks and Wildlife.

== See also ==
- List of Eucalyptus species
