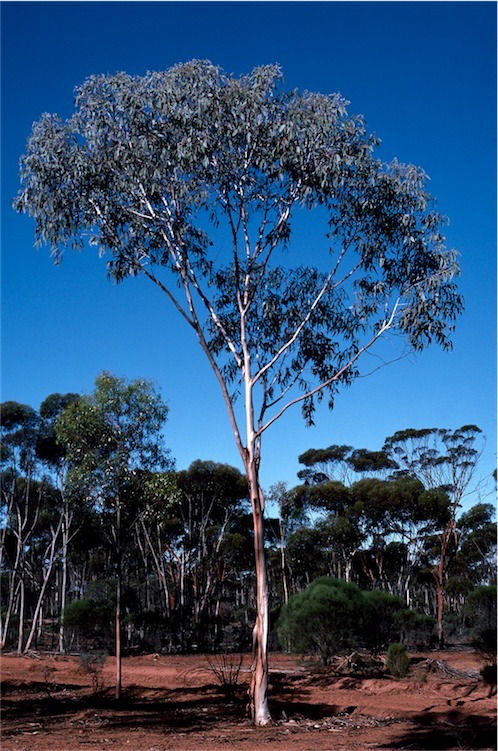
- Eucalyptus georgei between Hyden and Norseman

Conservation status
- Vulnerable (IUCN 3.1)

Scientific classification
- Kingdom: Plantae
- Clade: Tracheophytes
- Clade: Angiosperms
- Clade: Eudicots
- Clade: Rosids
- Order: Myrtales
- Family: Myrtaceae
- Genus: Eucalyptus
- Species: E. georgei

Binomial name
- Eucalyptus georgei Brooker & Blaxell

= Eucalyptus georgei =

Hyden blue gum

Species of eucalyptus

Eucalyptus georgei, commonly known as Hyden blue gum, is a species of tree or mallet that is endemic to Western Australia. It has smooth bark, glossy green, lance-shaped adult leaves, glaucous flower buds in groups of between seven and eleven, creamy white flowers and conical to cup-shaped fruit.

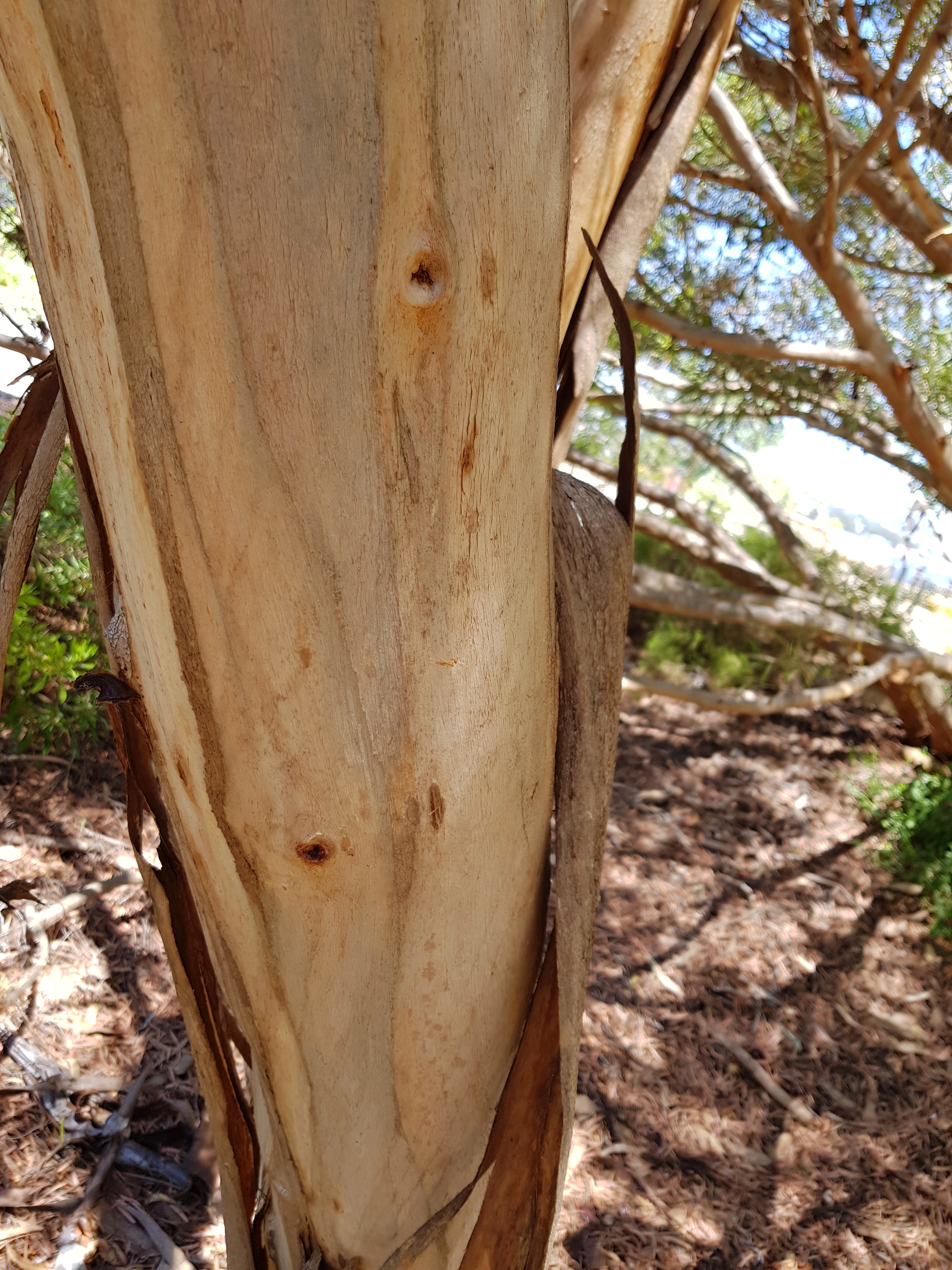
Fresh bark

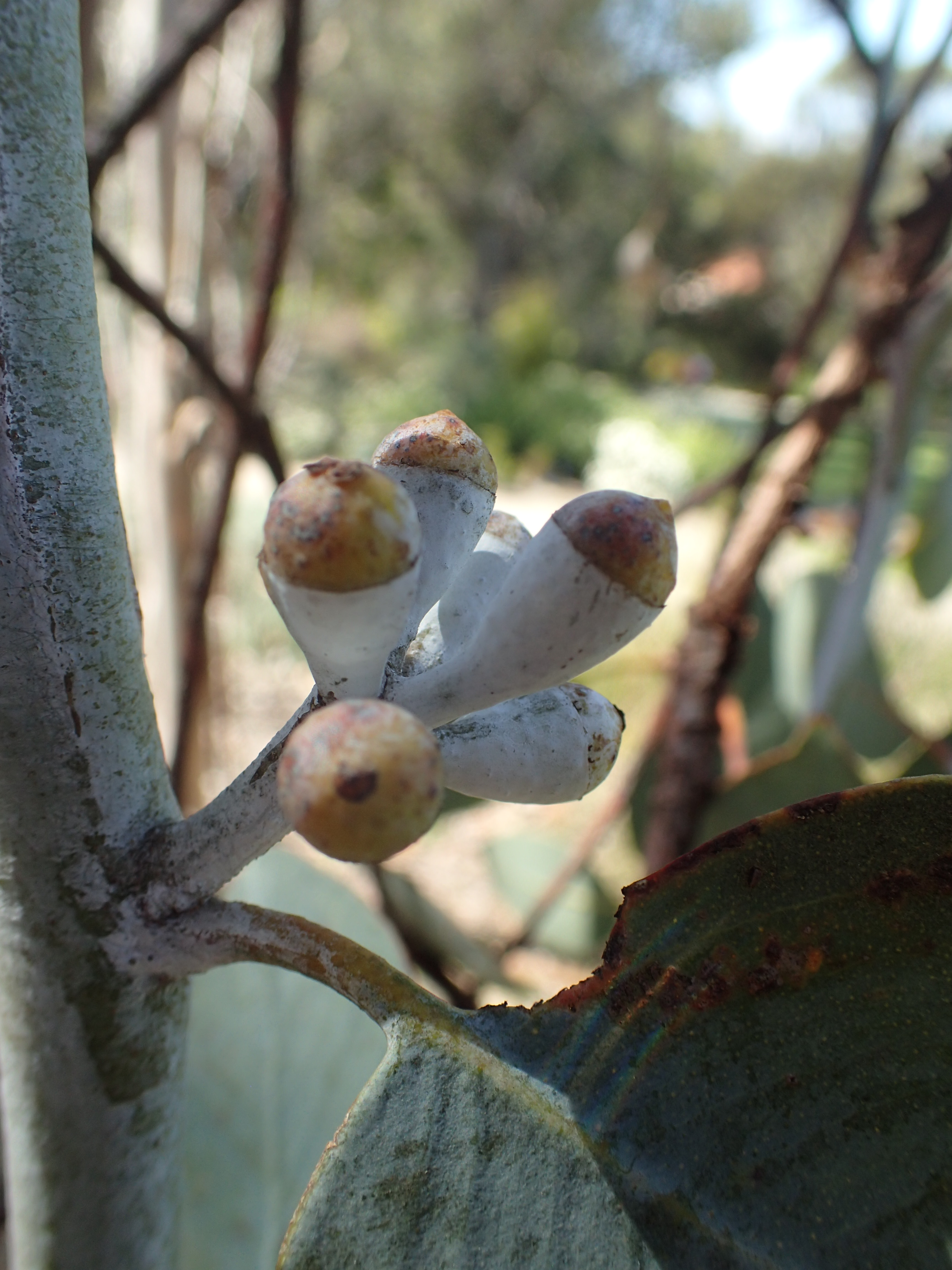
Flower buds

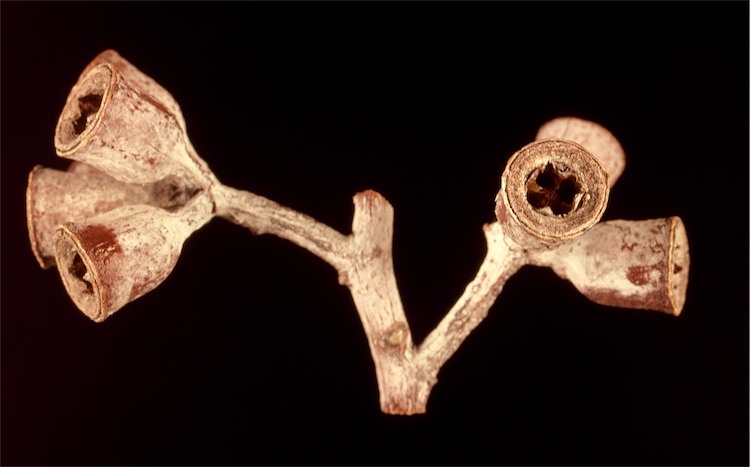
Fruit

== Description ==
Eucalyptus georgei is a tree or mallet that typically grows to a height of 4–20 m (13–66 ft) but does not form a lignotuber. It has smooth, pale grey and coppery-orange coloured bark that detaches in long ribbons. Young plants and coppice regrowth have glaucous, egg-shaped to broadly lance-shaped leaves that are 60–80 mm (2.4–3.1 in) long and 20–50 mm (0.79–1.97 in) wide. Adult leaves are either glossy green or glaucous, 100–200 mm (3.9–7.9 in) long and 1.5–4 mm (0.059–0.157 in) wide on a petiole 25–42 mm (0.98–1.65 in) long. The flower buds are arranged in leaf axils in groups of seven, nine or eleven on a thick, glaucous, unbranched peduncle 10–27 mm (0.39–1.06 in) long, the individual buds on pedicels about 4 mm (0.16 in) long. Mature buds are glaucous, oval to pear-shaped, about 10 mm (0.39 in) long and 7–8 mm (0.28–0.31 in) wide with a conical or rounded operculum. Flowering occurs between February and March and the flowers are creamy white. The fruit is a woody, usually glaucous, conical to cup-shaped capsule 8–12 mm (0.31–0.47 in) long and 8–11 mm (0.31–0.43 in) wide with the valves near rim level. The seeds are glossy red-brown, flattened oval and 1.5–3 mm (0.059–0.118 in) long.

== Taxonomy and naming ==
Eucalyptus georgei was first formally described in 1978 by Ian Brooker and Donald Blaxell from a specimen collected by Blaxell in 1975, 159 km (99 mi) east of Hyden on the track to Norseman.

In 1993 Brooker and Stephen Hopper described two subspecies and the names have been accepted by the Australian Plant Census:

- Eucalyptus georgei subsp. fulgida Brooker & Hopper differs from subspecies georgei in having shiny green, non-glaucous leaves and smaller, shorter fruits;
- Eucalyptus georgei Brooker & Blaxell subsp. georgei.

The specific epithet honours the botanist Alex George for his assistance to both the authors. The epithet fulgida is from the Latin fulgidus meaning "shining".

== Distribution ==
The Hyden blue gum is found in a small area where the Wheatbelt region meets the Goldfields-Esperance region between Hyden to east of Kalgoorlie. It grows on lateritic rises and in depressions in calcareous loam, clayey sand or sandy soils.

== See also ==
- List of Eucalyptus species
