= Donald Frederick Blaxell =

Australian botanist (1934–2026)

Donald Frederick Blaxell OAM (1 February 1934 – 30 June 2026) was an Australian botanist, botanical collector and taxonomist.

== Life and career ==
Blaxell was born in Sydney, New South Wales on 1 February 1934. He worked at the University of New South Wales for 11 years and joined the New south Wales Herbarium in 1968. Blaxell was particularly interested in plants from family Orchidaceae and the genus Eucalyptus. He worked extensively with Lawrence Alexander Sidney Johnson through the 1960s completing descriptions of many species. Blaxell was also an avid collector, particularly Eucalyptus species, usually with Johnson or L D. Pryor.

He was appointed as the Australian Botanical Liaison Officer at Kew Gardens between 1974 and 1975. In 2001, he was awarded an OAM in the Australia Day honours. Eucalyptus blaxellii was named in his honour by L.A.S.Johnson & K.D. Hill in 1992.

Blaxell died on 30 June 2026, at the age of 92.

== Selected works ==
- Contributions from the New South Wales Herbarium
- The Orchids of Australia - the Eastern Temperate Zone, 1971
- Blaxell, D F. 1975. The Status of Schlechter's Specimens of Orchidaceae held at the National Herbarium of New South Wales - 2. New Caledonia, Celebes, Borneo, Sumatra, 1975. Telopea 1(1). S. 49–54
- Rotherham, E R; B G Briggs; D F Blaxell; R C Carolin. Australian Flora in Colour: Flowers and Plants of New South Wales and Southern Queensland. Together with E. R. Rotherham, B. G. Biggs und R. C. Carolin. Publisher: A.H. & A.W. Reed, Sydney 1975
- Notes on Australian Orchidaceae - a new combination in Liparis, 1978. Telopea 1(5). S. 357–358
- Type Specimens of Schlechter's Names in Orchidaceae at the Conservatoire et Jardin Botaniques, Geneve, 1978. Telopea 1(5). S. 359–363
- A new Species of Stylidium (Stylidiaceae) from the Sydney Region, 1978. Together with M. M. Hindmarsh. Telopea 1(5). S. 365–370
- Flowers & Plants of New South Wales & Southern Queensland. Together with E. R. Rotherham, B. G. Briggs and R. C. Carolin. Publisher: Reed Books, Sydney 1979, 192 S., 556 farbige Abbildungen
- New Taxa and Combinations in Eucalyptus-4, 1980. Together with L. A. S. Johnson. Telopea 1(6). S. 395–397
- The Orchidaceae of German New Guinea. Incorporating the Figure Atlas. Together with R. S. Rogers, H. J. Katz und J. T. Sommons. Melbourne, Australian Orchid Foundation, Melbourne 1982.
